= Henry Miller bibliography =

The following is a bibliography of Henry Miller by category.

== Books and collections ==
- Tropic of Cancer, Paris: Obelisk Press, 1934.
  - New York: Grove Press, 1961. ISBN 0-8021-3178-6
- Black Spring, Paris: Obelisk Press, 1936.
  - New York: Grove Press, 1963. ISBN 0-8021-3182-4
- Tropic of Capricorn, Paris: Obelisk Press, 1939.
  - New York: Grove Press, 1961. ISBN 0-8021-5182-5
- The Cosmological Eye, Norfolk, CT: New Directions, 1939. ISBN 0-8112-0110-4
- The Colossus of Maroussi, San Francisco: Colt Press, 1941.
  - New York: New Directions, 1958. ISBN 0-8112-0109-0
- The Wisdom of the Heart, Norfolk, CT: New Directions, 1941.
  - New York: New Directions, 1960. ISBN 0-8112-0116-3
- Sunday After the War, Norfolk, CT: New Directions, 1944.
- The Air-Conditioned Nightmare, New York: New Directions, 1945.
  - New York: New Directions, 1970. ISBN 0-8112-0106-6
- Why Abstract? with Hilaire Hiler and William Saroyan, New York: New Directions, 1945.
  - New York: Haskell House, 1974. ISBN 0-8383-1837-1
- Remember to Remember, New York: New Directions, 1947. (Volume 2 of The Air-Conditioned Nightmare.)
  - London: Grey Walls Press, 1952.
- The Smile at the Foot of the Ladder, New York: Duell, Sloan and Pearce, 1948.
  - Kansas City, MO: Hallmark Editions, 1971. ISBN 0-87529-173-2
- Sexus (Book one of The Rosy Crucifixion), Paris: Obelisk Press, 1949.
  - New York: Grove Press, 1963. ISBN 0-394-62371-1
- The Books in My Life, Norfolk, CT: New Directions, 1952.
  - New York: New Directions, 1969. ISBN 0-8112-0108-2
- Plexus (Book two of The Rosy Crucifixion), Paris: Olympia Press, 1953.
  - New York: Grove Press, 1963. ISBN 0-8021-5179-5
- Nights of Love and Laughter, Signet, 1955.
- A Devil in Paradise, New York: New American Library, 1956.
  - New York: New Directions, 1993. ISBN 0-8112-1244-0
- Quiet Days in Clichy, with photographs by Brassaï, Paris: Olympia Press, 1956.
  - New York: Grove Press, 1987. ISBN 0-8021-3016-X
  - Richmond, England: Oneworld Classics, 2007. ISBN 978-1-84749-036-0
- The Time of the Assassins: A Study of Rimbaud, New York: New Directions, 1956.
  - New York: New Directions, 1962. ISBN 0-8112-0115-5
- Big Sur and the Oranges of Hieronymus Bosch, New York: New Directions, 1957. ISBN 0-8112-0107-4
- The Henry Miller Reader, ed. Lawrence Durrell, New York: New Directions, 1959.
- Nexus (Book three of The Rosy Crucifixion), Paris: Obelisk Press, 1960.
  - New York: Grove Press, 1965. ISBN 0-8021-5178-7
- Stand Still Like the Hummingbird, New York: New Directions, 1962. ISBN 0-8112-0322-0
- Henry Miller on Writing, New York: New Directions, 1964. ISBN 0-8112-0112-0
- Insomnia or the Devil at Large, Albuquerque: Loujon Press, 1970.
  - Garden City, NY: Doubleday, 1974.
- My Life and Times, New York: Playboy Press, 1971.
- The Nightmare Notebook, New York: New Directions, 1975. Notes and drawings.
- Henry Miller's Book of Friends: A Tribute to Friends of Long Ago, Santa Barbara, CA: Capra Press, 1976. ISBN 0-88496-050-1
- The World of Lawrence: A Passionate Appreciation, Santa Barbara: Capra Press, 1980.
- Sextet, Santa Barbara, CA: Capra Press, 1977. ISBN 0-88496-119-2
  - New York: New Directions, 2010. ISBN 978-0-8112-1800-9
- My Bike and Other Friends, Volume II, Book of Friends, Santa Barbara, CA: Capra Press, 1978. ISBN 0-88496-075-7
- Joey: A Loving Portrait of Alfred Perlès Together With Some Bizarre Episodes Relating to the Opposite Sex, Volume III, Book of Friends, Santa Barbara, CA: Capra Press, 1979. ISBN 0-88496-136-2

== Pamphlets and small print runs ==
- Aller Retour New York, Paris: Obelisk Press, 1935.
- What Are You Going to Do about Alf? An Open Letter to All and Sundry, Paris: Pamphlet printed at author's expense, 1935.
  - London: Turret, 1971. ISBN 0-85469-022-0
- Max and the White Phagocytes, Paris: Obelisk Press, 1938.
  - New York: New Directions, 1991. ISBN 0-8112-1193-2
- The World of Sex, Chicago: Ben Abramson, Argus Book Shop, 1940.
  - Richmond, England: Oneworld Classics, 2007. ISBN 978-1-84749-035-3
- The Plight of the Creative Artist in the United States of America, ?:? [no publisher listed, but published by Bern Porter], [undated, internal evidence suggests 1944].
- Echolalia: Reproductions of Water Colors, Berkeley, CA: Bern Porter, 1945.
- Henry Miller Miscellanea, San Mateo, CA: Bern Porter, 1945.
- Maurizius Forever, San Francisco: Colt Press, 1946.
- Into the Night Life, privately published with Bezalel Schatz, 1947.
- The Waters Reglitterized: The Subject of Water Color in Some of Its More Liquid Phases, San Jose, CA: John Kidis, 1950.
  - Santa Barbara, CA: Capra Press, 1973. ISBN 0-912264-71-3
- The Red Notebook, Highlands, NC: Jargon Books, 1958. Facsimile of one of Miller's journals from 1939.
- To Paint is to Love Again, Alhambra, CA: Cambria Books, 1960.
  - New York: Grossman Publishers, 1968.
- Watercolors, Drawings, and His Essay "The Angel Is My Watermark", New York: Abrams, 1962.
- Greece (with drawings by Anne Poor), New York: Viking Press, 1964.
- On Turning Eighty, Santa Barbara, CA: Capra Press, 1972. ISBN 0912264438, 9780912264431
- The Immortal Bard, London: Village Press, 1973. (About John Cowper Powys, print run of 500 copies.)
- First Impressions of Greece, Santa Barbara, CA: Capra Press, 1973. ISBN 0-912264-59-4
- Mother, China, and the World Beyond, Santa Barbara, CA: Capra Press, 1977. ISBN 0-884961-04-4
- Reflections on the Maurizius Case: A Humble Appraisal of a Great Book, Santa Barbara, CA: Capra Press, 1974. ISBN 0-912264-73-X

== Plays ==
- Just Wild About Harry, New York: New Directions, 1963.
  - New York: New Directions, 1979. ISBN 0-8112-0724-2

== Correspondence ==
- Hamlet Volume I with Michael Fraenkel, New York: Carrefour, 1939.
- Hamlet Volume II with Michael Fraenkel, New York: Carrefour, 1941.
  - Above two volumes republished, minus two letters, as Henry Miller's Hamlet Letters, Santa Barbara, CA: Capra Press, 1988. ISBN 0-88496-269-5
- Letters to Anaïs Nin, 1965.
- The Plight of the Creative Artist in the United States of America, Houlton, ME: Bern Porter, 1944.
- Semblance of a Devoted Past, Berkeley, CA: Bern Porter, 1944. A collection of Miller’s letters to Emil Schnellock.
- Reunion in Barcelona: a Letter to Alfred Perlès, from Aller Retour New York, Northwood, England: Scorpion Press, 1959.
- Lawrence Durrell and Henry Miller: A Private Correspondence, ed. George Wickes, E.P. Dutton, 1963.
- A Literate Passion: Letters of Anaïs Nin and Henry Miller, 1932-1953, ed. Gunther Stuhlmann. San Diego: Harcourt Brace Jovanovich, 1987.
- The Durrell-Miller Letters, 1935-80, ed. Ian S. MacNiven, New York: New Directions, 1988.
- From Your Capricorn Friend: Henry Miller and the Stroker, 1978-1980, New York: New Directions, 1984. Correspondence with Irving Stettner.
- Letters to Emil, New York: New Directions, 1989. A collection of Miller’s letters to Emil Schnellock, from 1921-34.
- Proteus and the Magician: The Letters of Henry Miller and John Cowper Powys, ed. Jacqueline Peltier. London: The Powys Society, 2014.

== Posthumous publications ==
- Moloch: or, This Gentile World, written in 1927, published by the Estate of Henry Miller. New York: Grove Press, 1992. ISBN 0-8021-1419-9
- Crazy Cock (originally titled Lovely Lesbians), written in 1928–30, published by the Estate of Henry Miller. New York: Grove Weidenfeld, 1991. ISBN 0-8021-1412-1
- Opus Pistorum, (from the Latin, Work of the Miller), written as pornography-for-hire in 1941 (see Anaïs Nin), was retitled in its second edition Under the Roofs of Paris, published by the Estate of Henry Miller. New York: Grove Press, 1983. ISBN 0-8021-3183-2
- Paris 1928 (Nexus II), abandoned continuation of Nexus, written in 1961, published by Bloomington: Indiana University Press, 2012.
- Into the Heart of Life: Henry Miller at One Hundred, ed. Frederick Turner, New York: New Directions, 1991.

== Unpublished work ==
- Clipped Wings, Miller's first novel, written in 1922.

== Discography ==
- Henry Miller Recalls and Reflects: An Extraordinary American Writer Speaks Out (2 LP records, RLP 7002/3), New York: Riverside Records, 1956.
