= Big Sur and the Oranges of Hieronymus Bosch =

1957 memoir by Henry Miller

- First US edition, 1957
- Author: Henry Miller
- Language: English
- Genre: Memoir, nonfiction
- Publisher: New Directions
- Publication date: 1957
- Publication place: United States
- Media type: Print
- Pages: 404
- Preceded by: Quiet Days in Clichy
- Followed by: Nexus

Big Sur and the Oranges of Hieronymus Bosch is a memoir written by Henry Miller, first published in 1957, about his life in Big Sur, California, where he resided for 18 years.

== History ==
=== Background ===
In 1939, Miller left France for Greece, where he remained until 1940, leaving because of World War II. He returned to New York and made a year-long trip around the US, which resulted in his book The Air-Conditioned Nightmare. He moved to California in June 1942, living in Beverly Glen for over a year. In 1944, he moved to Big Sur, a section of the California coast, living in Partington Ridge from May 1944 until January 1946. He then married Janina Martha Lepska, his third wife, and they moved to Anderson Creek. In February 1947 they returned to Partington Ridge, where he remained until 1962. He and Lepska separated in 1951 and divorced the following year. She moved to Long Beach, and their children, Tony and Val, stayed with Miller in the summers and at Christmas time. Miller married his fourth wife, Eve McClure, on December 29, 1953. They divorced in 1960. He moved to Pacific Palisades in 1963, where he would live for the rest of his life.

=== Publication ===
At the time of the book's publication, numerous Miller books were still banned in the US: Tropic of Cancer, Aller Retour New York, Black Spring, Tropic of Capricorn, The World of Sex, Quiet Days in Clichy, Sexus and Plexus. Miller was working on Nexus at the time of Big Sur's publication. After the publication of the book, which presents Big Sur as paradise on earth, many fans began to arrive in Big Sur to explore the area and seek out Miller.

== Summary ==
The title of the book is taken from 15th-century Dutch painter Hieronymus Bosch's triptych The Garden of Earthly Delights, where oranges and other fruits symbolize the delights of paradise. The book is dedicated to Miller's friend Emil White, who established the Henry Miller Memorial Library in his old cabin in Big Sur.

The first two main parts of the book are portraits of Big Sur, with descriptions of its inhabitants, including writers, mystics, and two of Miller's children, Tony and Val. There are also reflections on the benefits of solitude, and on events from Miller's past.

The third part tells the story of when Miller was visited by an old friend from Paris, the French astrologer Conrad Moricand, in 1947. Moricand had written Miller that he was penniless. Miller invited Moricand to live with him in Big Sur for the rest of his life. Moricand arrived at the end of the year. The arrangement quickly turned into a disaster. Although Miller had told Moricand about Big Sur's isolated and rugged life, Moricand was unprepared and often complained about the weather, food, and his own poor health, among other things. Miller put Moricand in a hotel in Monterey, and arranged for him to return to France. Moricand did not immediately return to Europe, however, instead writing Miller angry letters about his perceived mistreatment. Miller wrote about this episode, which would be published in 1956 as A Devil in Paradise, and a year later as the third part of Big Sur, called "Paradise Lost."

The lengthy epilogue details the many letters he has received from readers, and concludes by asking the readers not to write to him anymore. It was originally written in Anderson Creek in 1946, and revised for the book's publication.
