= Aller Retour New York =

1935 novel by Henry Miller

- First edition
- Author: Henry Miller
- Language: English
- Publisher: Obelisk Press
- Publication date: 1935, reprinted 1991
- Publication place: United States
- Media type: Print
- Pages: 77 pp
- ISBN: 978-0-8112-1226-7
- OCLC: 26853956
- Dewey Decimal: 818/.5203 B 20
- LC Class: PS3525.I5454 Z462 1993
- Preceded by: Tropic of Cancer
- Followed by: Black Spring

Aller Retour New York is a novel by American writer Henry Miller, published in 1935 by Obelisk Press in Paris, France.

Published after his breakthrough book Tropic of Cancer, Aller Retour New York takes the form of a long letter from Miller to his friend Alfred Perlès in Paris. In the book Miller describes his experiences on a trip back to New York City, his birthplace, in pursuit of his sometime lover Anaïs Nin, who had left Paris for New York in the company of psychoanalyst Otto Rank. When Nin returned to Paris after a few months, Miller did so as well, with this book as his record of the visit.

Literary critic Shaun O'Connell describes the book as "a litany of [Miller's] disenchantment with America," and Miller's view of New York as "the symbolic center of American corruption." Miller paints an unpleasant picture of a New York that, in Miller's eyes, is distinctly inferior to Paris. The book contains many negative comments about women and New York's many ethnic groups, especially Jews, leading to concerns that the book was antisemitic. In his preface to a later French translation, Miller noted that he had modified some of the book's "harsh, seemingly unjustified references to the Jews", which he explained as a function of his "extravagant and reckless" youthful prose. On the other hand, in a 1971 letter to his publisher, Miller rejected any charges of antisemitic content, although he also suggested delaying any reprint of the book while it "might rightly or wrongly create a bad impression".

The book went out of print after 1945, but was reprinted by New Directions Publishing in 1991 (and in a 1993 paperback edition). A critic for the British newspaper The Independent commented on the book's "blustering misogyny" and "racial swipes of the kind common to much pre-war American literature" but also observed that it had "some arresting moments." Writing for Entertainment Weekly, critic Margot Mifflin described the book as a "springboard" for Miller's 1939 novel Tropic of Capricorn, "an uproarious critique of America" presaging Miller's 1945 book The Air-Conditioned Nightmare, and "a central document of Miller's picaresque life." Critic Gerald Stern found the book, and its bigotry, to be "an attack on any kind of social action, even on hope", in which Miller "seems actually to hate everything, or really not to love anything" except a few people he meets.
