= Moloch: or, This Gentile World =

1992 novel by Henry Miller

- First edition cover, 1992
- Author: Henry Miller
- Language: English
- Genre: Autobiographical novel
- Publisher: Grove Press
- Publication date: 1992
- Publication place: United States
- Media type: Print
- Pages: 266

Moloch: or, This Gentile World is a semi-autobiographical novel written by Henry Miller in 1927–28, initially under the guise of a novel written by his wife, June. The book went unpublished until 1992, 65 years after it was written and 12 years after Miller's death. It is widely considered to be of interest more as a study of Miller's artistic growth than as a worthy piece of fiction.

== History ==
=== Background ===
Moloch was the second novel Miller wrote. The first, Clipped Wings, which has never been published, was written during a three-week vacation from Western Union in March 1922. Only fragments of his first effort remain, although parts of it were recycled in other works, such as Tropic of Capricorn. A study of twelve Western Union messengers, Miller called Clipped Wings "a long book and probably a very bad one."

=== Writing ===
In 1927, the year he began writing Moloch, Miller was living on Henry Street in Brooklyn Heights with his second wife, June, and her lesbian lover, Jean Kronski. June had convinced Miller to quit his job at Western Union to concentrate on writing full-time, but he struggled to write. One day, he returned home to find that June and Jean had left, taking a boat to Paris without telling him. Heartbroken, he moved back in with his parents at the age of 35.

When June returned two months later, without Jean, she and Miller moved to an expensive apartment on Clinton Avenue in Fort Greene. Here, Miller finally began working on his first novel, after June convinced an older rich man, Roland Freedman, to pay her a weekly stipend to write a novel. June would show Freedman pages of Miller's work each week, pretending it was hers. Freedman was most likely in love with June. He offered to give her enough money to take a trip to Europe should she finish the book, a trip she and Miller did end up taking at Freedman's expense, in 1928. Freedman committed suicide in the early 1930s, possibly as a result of his failure to convince June to become his lover; it has alternately been stated that Freedman and June were lovers.

In his 1959 autobiographical novel Nexus, Miller chronicles this period, when he was struggling to become a writer while living with June (“Mona”) and Jean (“Anastasia”), and Freedman (“Pop”) was funding the chapters of Moloch.

=== Inspiration ===
Moloch is based on Miller's first marriage, to Beatrice (“Blanche”), and his years working as a personnel manager at the Western Union office in Lower Manhattan (called the Great American Telegraph Company in Moloch, and the Cosmodemonic Telegraph Company in later works). Miller married Beatrice in 1917; they divorced in 1924.

=== Publication ===
In 1930, while Miller was living in Paris, the Moloch manuscript was being read by Edward Titus, owner of Black Mannikin Press. A few months later, with no response from Titus or a different publisher in Berlin, Miller abandoned the novel. He realized it was “utterly false,” a realization that paved the way for him to write Tropic of Cancer.

The manuscript was uncovered in 1988 by Mary Dearborn, and published four years later by Grove Press. According to Erica Jong, Miller left Moloch and another unpublished novel, Crazy Cock, with his friend Emil Schnellock when he set sail for Europe in 1930. According to Dearborn, June Miller was in possession of the Moloch and Crazy Cock manuscripts until the 1950s, when she returned them to Miller nearly two decades after their divorce. He eventually donated them to the Department of Special Collections at UCLA, where they sat uncatalogued for years.

== Plot ==
The novel follows Dion Moloch, an intellectual, prejudiced, unmotivated, enigmatic employment manager at the Great American Telegraph Company in New York City. Moloch, a third-generation American, resides in Brooklyn with his wife, Blanche, and their young daughter. Miserable in his unhappy marriage, he goes out at night looking for adventure, trading stories with friends and engaging in extramarital affairs. He regrets not marrying his first love, Cora, and feels Blanche should have married a previous lover, Jim Daly. He intends to use his past as material for a book, but when he sits down to write, he is unable to accurately capture his thoughts.

== Style ==
The original manuscript of Moloch contains instructions handwritten by Miller to rework chapter 13 for Tropic of Capricorn. Unlike his later, acclaimed work, which is written in the first person, Moloch is written in the third person. Similar to his other novels, the protagonist spends much time wandering the city streets, and many of the characters are based on Miller's real-life friends and acquaintances.

== Criticism and controversy ==
The novel's main character, Dion Moloch, is described as an anti-Semite on the opening page. The book also contains racist, sexist and homophobic terms. It has been suggested that Miller may have inserted anti-Semitic ramblings into the text primarily to annoy June, his Jewish second wife. Others have attributed Dion Moloch's anti-Semitism to “Miller’s propensity for violent language and his strong desire to shock,” also seen in his later work (minus any traces of anti-Semitism). There are also passages in the book in which Miller speaks highly of Jews, and rebukes others for their own anti-Semitism. The book has been called “ugly,” “baffling” and “misguided.”
