= Hacia Dos Veranos =

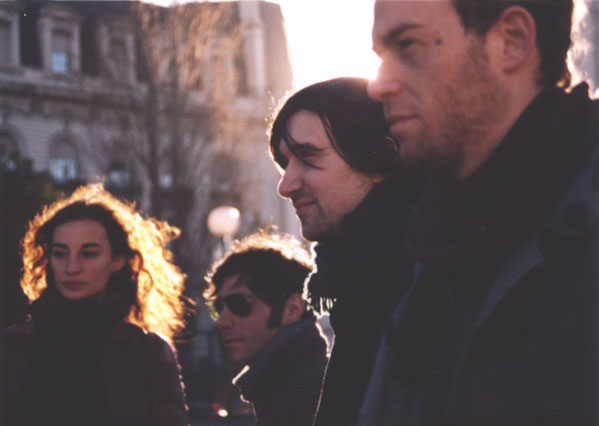

Background information
- Also known as: H2V
- Origin: Buenos Aires, Argentina
- Genres: Post-rock, Indie
- Years active: 2005 – ...
- Labels: Scatter Records; I Wish I Was Unpopular Records
- Members: Ignacio Aguiló; Diego Martínez; Julia Bayse; Diego Acosta; Patricio Dellariva; Ezequiel Llorente
- Website: Official Webpage

Hacia Dos Veranos (Towards Two Summers in English) is an Argentinian post-rock band born in 2005 as a project of two friends who moved to Buenos Aires to study. The band released in August 2005 an EP called Fragmentos De Una Tarde Somnolienta ("Fragments From a Sleepy Afternoon") which was released in Argentina by MuyModerna Records and in England in February 2006 by I Wish I Was Unpopular Records. In May 2007 they released their first full-length album called De Los Valles y Volcanes ("Of Valleys and Volcanoes"') under Scatter Records in Argentina and Discos de la Bahía in Spain. In July 2010 their self-titled second album was made available to the public at the band's Bandcamp page.

The name of the band is based on the book Tropic Of Cancer by Henry Miller and like they stated: "Summer is the season that better memories give us, going into two summers it's like going in search for happiness".

== Discography ==
=== Studio albums ===
- Hacia Dos Veranos (2010)
- De Los Valles y Volcanes (2007)

=== EPs ===
- Fragmentos De Una Tarde Somnolienta (EP) (2005)

=== Compilations ===
- It's the Taking Part that Counts (wiaiwya, UK, 2012): Features the song The Way of the Hand and the Foot.
- Hangover Lounge EP 1 (Hangover Lounge, UK, 2010): Features the song The Cat & Cucumber.
- Porque este océano es el tuyo, es el mío ( Si no puedo bailar, no es mi revolución, Brazil, 2007): Features the song Despertar.
- Let it bee (My Honey Records, Italy, 2007): Features the song La última tarde del apicultor.
- 25 Canciones para escuchar mientras te haces una tostada (Argentina, 2007): Features the song Despertar.
- Granada Vol 2 (Molecula Records, Mexico, 2006): Features the song Despertar.
- Canciones pegajosas (ZonaIndie, Argentina, 2005): Features the song Despertar.
- There goes winter (Kidart, Argentina, 2005): Features the song Preludio.

== Members ==
=== Hacia Dos Veranos ===
- Ignacio Aguiló: guitar
- Diego Martínez: bass, keyboards
- Diego Acosta: guitar, keyboards
- Julia Bayse: flute, keyboards
- Patricio Dellariva (2009-), Andrés Edelstein (2006-8), Sebastián Henderson (2005-6): drums
- Ezequiel Llorente (2009-): guitar
