= Quiet Days in Clichy =

Quiet Days in Clichy may refer to:

- Quiet Days in Clichy (novel), by Henry Miller, published in 1956
- Quiet Days in Clichy (1970 film), Danish film based on the novel
- Quiet Days in Clichy (1990 film), French film based on the novel
