= June Miller =

Second wife of novelist Henry Miller (1902–1979)

June Mansfield Miller
- Miller, circa 1933
- Born: Juliet Edith Smerth; January 7, 1902; Bukovina, Austria-Hungary
- Died: February 1, 1979 (aged 77); Phoenix, Arizona, U.S.
- Other names: June Mansfield, June Smith, Juliet Edith Smerdt
- Spouses: Henry Miller (m. 1924; div. 1934) Stratford Corbett (m. 1935; div. 1947)

June Miller (January 7 or 28, 1902 – February 1, 1979) was an American woman who was married to novelist Henry Miller and influenced several of his literary works. In Miller's literary works, he usually depicted her under the pseudonyms Mona or Mara. She also appears prominently in the early diaries of Anaïs Nin.

== Early life ==
June Miller was born in Bukovina, Austria-Hungary as Juliet Edith Smerdt (or Smerth) (later Juliette), the daughter of Wilhelm and Frances Budd Smerdt, a poor Jewish family. Miller described her as being of Romanian origin in his novel Sexus. She emigrated with her parents and four siblings to the United States in 1907. At the age of 15, she dropped out of high school to become a dance instructress (a euphemism at the time for a dance partner) at Wilson's Dancing Academy (renamed the Orpheum Dance Palace in 1931) in Times Square, and began going by the name June Mansfield, and occasionally, June Smith. June is quoted as saying, "My formal education amounted to about three and a half years of high school. I was working on a scholarship to Hunter College." In Sexus, Henry Miller writes that June claimed she graduated from Wellesley, but in Nexus, he writes that she never finished high school.

She lived in New York City for much of her life, except for a tour of Europe and periods spent in Paris and Arizona.

== Life with Henry Miller ==
In 1923, while working as a taxi dancer at Wilson's, she met Henry Miller; she was 21 and he, 31. June married Henry in Hoboken, New Jersey, on June 1, 1924, after he had left his first wife, Beatrice Sylvas Wickens, and their child. Their relationship is the main subject of Miller's semi-autobiographical trilogy, The Rosy Crucifixion. June is also featured in his best-known works, Tropic of Cancer and Tropic of Capricorn.

In October 1926, Jean Kronski, an artist and poet, moved in with them at June's urging. June, who was likely bisexual, cultivated a very close relationship with her, often preferring Jean's affections to Henry's. This living arrangement soon fell apart and Jean and June left for Paris together in April 1927. However, two months later the two women started to quarrel, and June returned to Henry in July. The following year, June and Henry left for a tour of Europe, settling in Paris for several months before again returning to New York. June's relationship with Jean is the central piece of Henry's autobiographical novels Crazy Cock (1930, unpublished until 12 years after Miller's death) and Nexus (1959), the third volume of The Rosy Crucifixion. Around 1930, Kronski committed suicide in an insane asylum in New York.

In 1930, June and Henry began living separately when Henry moved to Paris alone. In 1931, while visiting Henry, June met writer Anaïs Nin. Nin quickly became obsessed with her and, like Henry, used her as an archetype in many of her writings. June and Nin became involved in a flirtatious relationship, although Nin denied it was sexual. However, June would figure prominently in her published and unpublished diaries, upon which the movie Henry & June was loosely based. In the film, she was portrayed by Uma Thurman. June was not pleased with the publication of Nin's expurgated diaries, which omitted Nin's affair with Miller and thus omitted the role Nin played in the breakup of the Millers' marriage.

June and Henry divorced by proxy in Mexico City in 1934.

== Later life ==
After divorcing Miller, she married insurance salesman Stratford Corbett around 1935. She was being courted by Corbett when Miller left for Paris in 1930. Miller reportedly reacted badly when he learned that June and Corbett were together. Corbett left her in 1947 for the actress Rita La Roy Corbett. June lived in a series of cheap hotels around New York City, such as the Hotel Continental on 95th Street. She was in touch with Miller during this period through the post, and he sent her money through friends and bookstores such as the Gotham Book Mart. The notebooks Miller kept on his 1940 trip across the United States that would become The Air-Conditioned Nightmare included a handful of stray references to June. One reads, "Sit here dreaming of June. Where now, little June? Are you happy?"

During the 1950s, June was admitted to psychiatric wards where she received electric shock treatments, during which she broke several bones after falling off the operating table. She never fully recovered. In 1954, she began volunteering as a social worker. In 1957, she became an intern receptionist at the city welfare department, and was working for the department full-time by 1960. In 1961, she met Miller again. According to Miller, he was shocked by her physical and mental decline. The two did not rekindle their relationship. In the late 1960s, June moved to Arizona with one of her brothers. Although she expressed a desire to write an autobiography, no manuscript is known to survive, and she is known principally through her correspondence. She died in Arizona in 1979.

== Books featuring June ==
=== Fiction ===
- Henry Miller, Crazy Cock (originally titled Lovely Lesbians - as Hildred)
- Henry Miller, Tropic of Cancer (as Mona)
- Henry Miller, Tropic of Capricorn (as Mara)
- Henry Miller, The Rosy Crucifixion (Sexus, Plexus and Nexus - as Mara and Mona)
- Anaïs Nin, House of Incest (as Sabina)
- Anaïs Nin, A Spy in the House of Love

=== Nonfiction ===
- Brassaï, Henry Miller: The Paris Years
- Mary V. Dearborn, The Happiest Man Alive: A Biography of Henry Miller
- Kenneth C. Dick, Henry Miller: Colossus of One
- Robert Ferguson, Henry Miller: A Life
- Arthur Hoyle, The Unknown Henry Miller: A Seeker in Big Sur
- Anaïs Nin, The Diary of Anaïs Nin
- Anaïs Nin, Henry and June, from A Journal of Love: the Unexpurgated Diary of Anaïs Nin, 1931–1932
- Anaïs Nin, Incest: The Unexpurgated Diary of Anais Nin, 1931–1932
- Stephen Starck, June Scattered In Fragments: A Biographical Sketch of Henry Miller's Second Wife
- Frederick Turner, Renegade: Henry Miller and the Making of Tropic of Cancer
