= Clish =

Clish is an English surname of several possible origins. Notable people with the surname include:

- Colin Clish (born 1944), English footballer
- Tommy Clish (1932–2024), English footballer

== See also ==
- Cliche (surname)
- McClish
- McLeish
