= Clichy =

Clichy may refer to:

- Clichy, Hauts-de-Seine, a commune in the northwestern suburbs of Paris

== Other places in or near Paris ==
- Canton of Clichy, a Hauts-de-Seine administrative division, of which the commune of Clichy is the seat
- Clichy-sous-Bois, a commune in the eastern suburbs of Paris
- Boulevard de Clichy, a street in Paris's 9th and 18th arrondissements
- Place de Clichy, large square and traffic roundabout at the intersection of Paris's 8th, 9th, 17th, and 18th arrondissements
- Porte de Clichy station, a Paris Metro and RER station in the 17th arrondissement

== Other ==
- Club de Clichy, a political club during the French revolution
- Gaël Clichy (born 1985), a French footballer

== See also ==
- Quiet Days in Clichy (disambiguation)
- Cliché (disambiguation)
