= Cliché (disambiguation) =

Cliché is an adjective denoting overuse.

Cliché may also refer to:

== Arts and entertainment ==
=== Music ===
- Cliché (Hush Hush), a 2013 album by Alexandra Stan
  - "Cliché (Hush Hush)" (song), a song by Alexandra Stan
- "Cliché" (Machine Gun Kelly song), 2025
- Cliché, 2005 synthpop album by Melotron
- Cliché, a 2017 song by mxmtoon
- Cliché, a working name for Destiny's Child before they settled on their current name
- Clichés (album), a 1993 album by Alex Chilton
- Cliches, a 2022 song by Ben Rector from The Joy of Music
- Kliché, a Danish rock band

=== Other arts and entertainment ===
- Stereotype (printing), the original sense of the word "cliché"
- Cliché Magazine, a digital fashion magazine
- Cliché, a BBC radio comedy sketch show that was followed by the better-known Son of Cliché

== Other uses ==
- Cliché forgery, counterfeit coin (a subtype of fourrée) produced using a genuine coin to impress a design into silver foil
- Cliche River, in Chaudière-Appalaches, Quebec, Canada
- Cliché Skateboards, a skateboard company based in Lyon, France
- Cliche (surname)

== See also ==
- Cleché, a cross in heraldry
- Clichy (disambiguation)
