= Henry Miller Memorial Library =

Nonprofit library and cultural center

Coordinates: 36°13′15″N 121°45′13″W

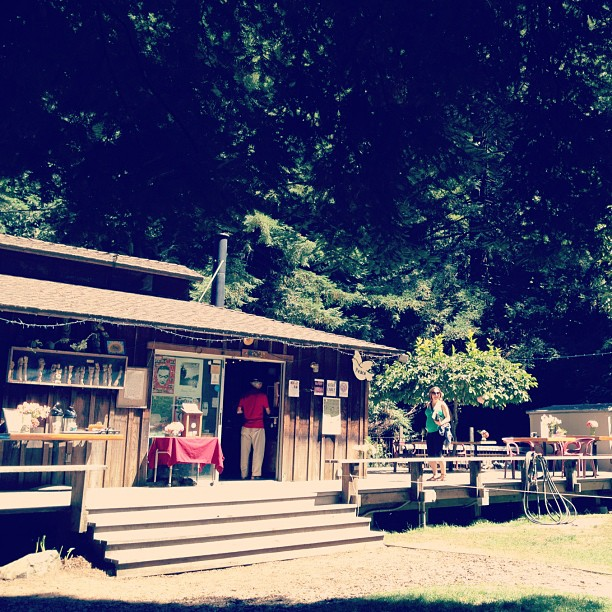
- Main building at Henry Miller Memorial Library
- Location: Big Sur, California, United States
- Type: Nonprofit arts center, Bookstore, Performance venue
- Established: 1981

Collection
- Size: Extensive repository of Henry Miller books, manuscripts, letters, and ephemera

Other information
- Director: Magnus Toren

The Henry Miller Memorial Library is a nonprofit arts center, bookstore, and performance venue in Big Sur, California, documenting the life of the late writer and artist Henry Miller. Emil White built the house for himself in the mid-1960s. After Miller died in 1980, White dedicated the property as a memorial to Miller and as a gallery where local artists could show their work. In 1981, with the help of the Big Sur Land Trust, White formally organized "The Henry Miller Memorial Library". White was director of the institution until he died in 1989. The Big Sur Land Trust managed the library until October 1998, when the non-profit The Henry Miller Memorial Library Inc. was created to sustain the library.

== Scholarly resources ==
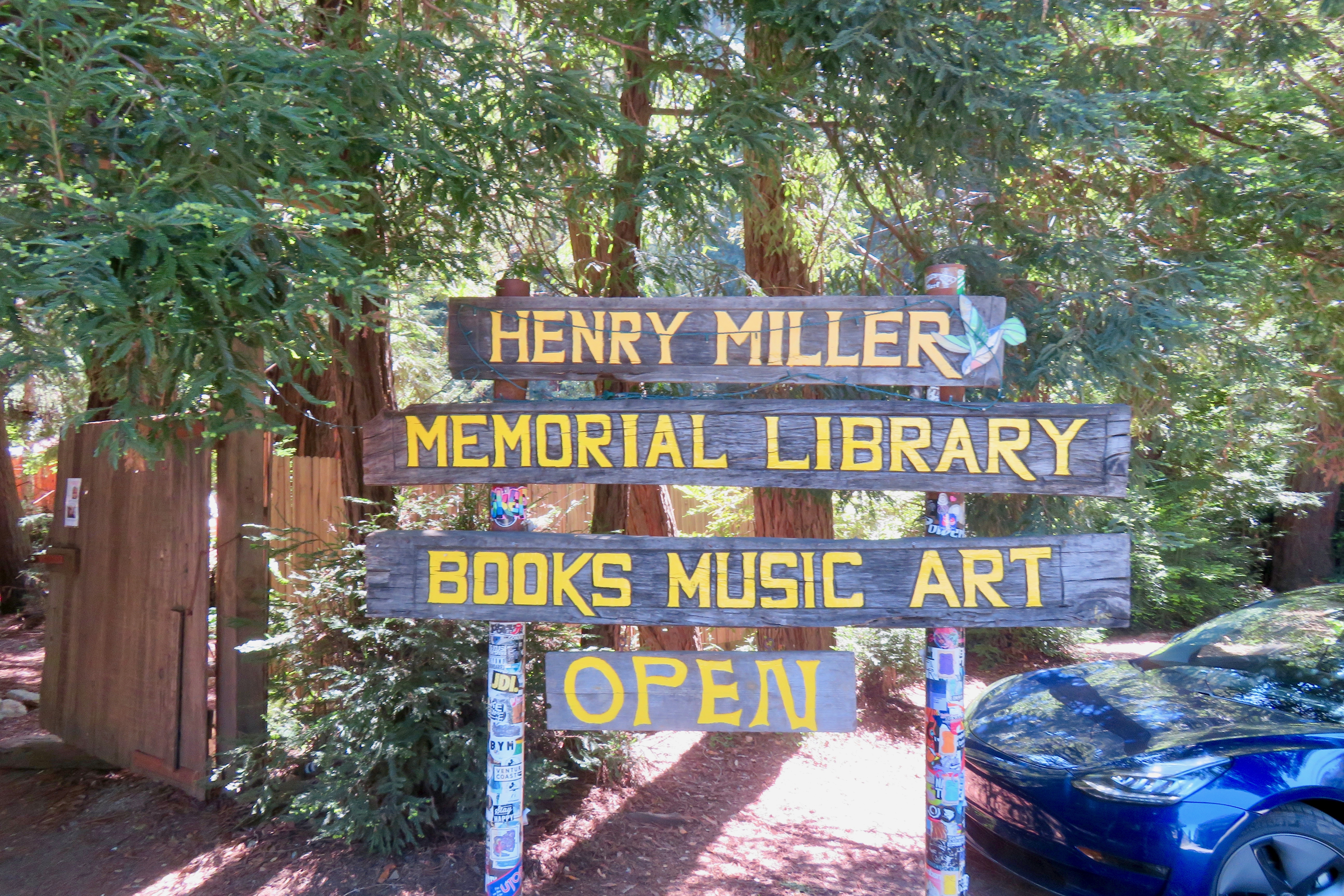
Entrance sign to Henry Miller Memorial Library

In 2000, the library acquired two major Miller collections, making the library the second most extensive repository of Miller books, manuscripts, letters and ephemera in the world, next only to the University of California at Los Angeles. The William Ashley Collection is likely the world's most complete collection of English language Miller editions, including almost every published version of Tropic of Cancer—over 120 in total. The collection was accumulated and donated by Henry Miller Library board member William Ashley. The Emil Schnellock Archive included many Miller books, manuscripts, letters, and ephemera collected by Emil Schnellock, Miller's lifelong friend and mentor from Brooklyn. The collection includes a first draft of Tropic of Cancer and hundreds of letters to and from Miller. The Schnellock Archive was acquired from an anonymous seller. Miller bibliographer Roger Jackson states that the collections make the library "an important stop" for Miller researchers.

== Cultural significance ==
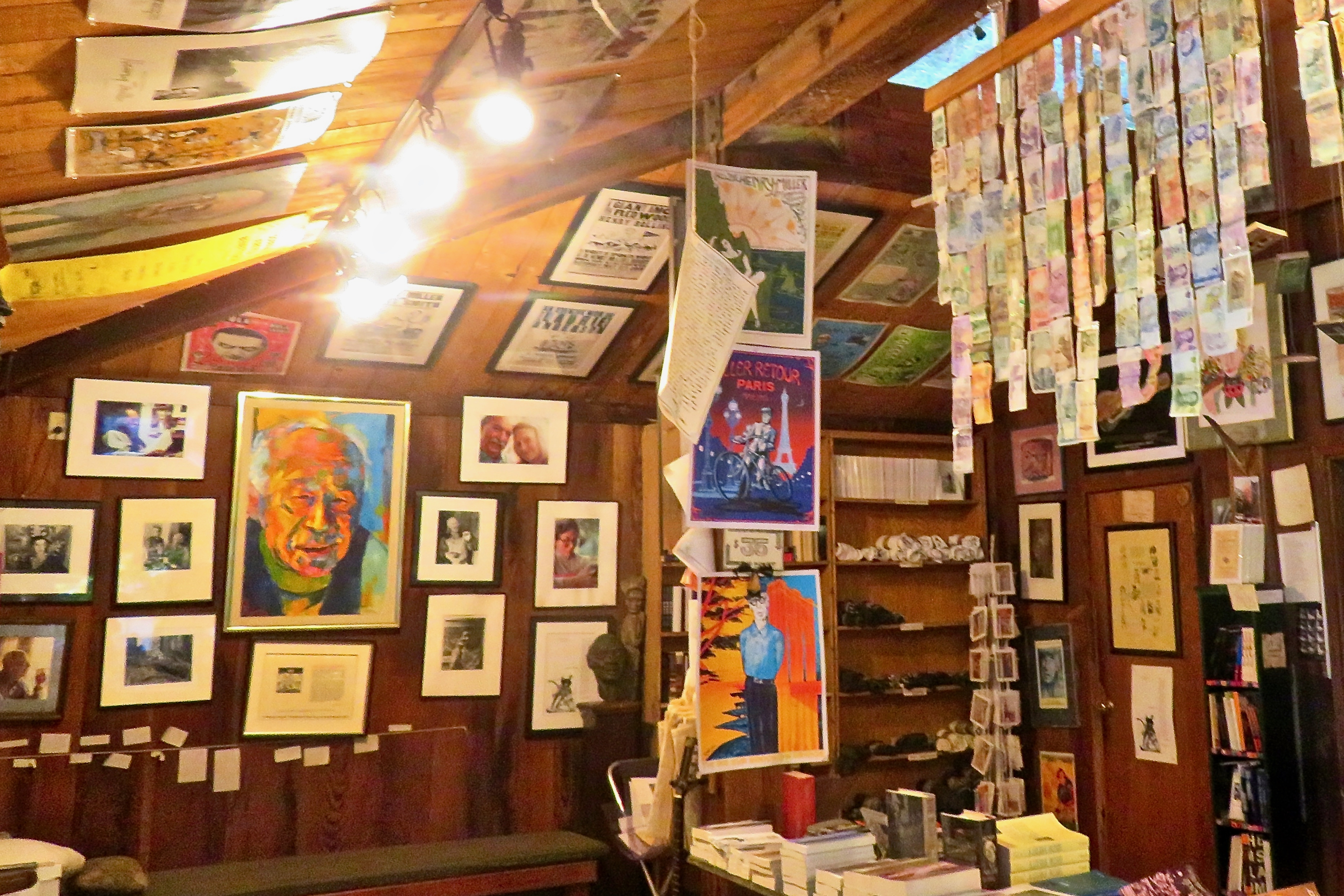
Interior of Henry Miller Memorial Library

Patti Smith led a fundraiser for the library in 2004. "Helping out the Library is helping out the consciousness and legacy of Henry Miller. The place is symbolic of his mind and life and energy."

In 2011, CNN Travel reported:

But the library isn't a remnant of what Big Sur was; it's the beating cultural heart of Big Sur right now. Popular bands like Arcade Fire perform here. And on any given weekend, you'll find a performance or a fair of some sort. But its default role is to be an oasis: Free coffee and ping-pong for the curious. A lush lawn to nap on.

Bikers, hippies and the polar-fleeced alike find reasons to linger here. After a day spent being humbled by the grandeur of Big Sur's natural bounty, checking in with fellow humans and the art they create can serve as a ballast.

In 2012, Philip Glass, along with musician and actress Joanna Newsom and violinist Tim Fain, performed at the Warfield in San Francisco in a benefit for the Library. In 2015, the library received a Community Stories Grant from Cal Humanities for its Big Sur Stories program. In 2016, the library, in tandem with ((folkYEAH!)) Presents, curated a benefit performance for homeowners affected by the Soberanes Fire. Performers included Sharon Van Etten, Mike Nesmith, Al Jardine (of the Beach Boys), Johnny Rivers, plus Meg Baird and Tara Jane O'Neil, and raised $40,000.

The library has also been featured in various international news outlets including the Irish Independent, Le Soir (France), Liberacion (France), NL Cafe (Hungary), Süddeutsche Zeitung (Germany), and Il Manifesto (Italy).

== Programming ==
The library hosts events throughout the year, including music, lectures, book signings, and community events. Past and ongoing programs include:

- The Big Sur International Short Film Screening Series. Now in its 11th year, the series' Jury includes Philip Glass, Laurie Anderson, and Kirsten Dunst.
- Big Sur Stories, an online archive of stories and reflections as told by members of the Big Sur community.
- Big Sur Fashion Show, featuring local artists and designers.
- Big Sur Writing Workshops for picture books, early reader, middle grade and YA fiction, produced annually in partnership with the Andrea Brown Literary Agency.
- Ping Pong Free Press, which publishes works of poetry and fiction.
- Big Sur Brooklyn Bridge (2013), a week-long celebration of Henry Miller based at the City Reliquary in Williamsburg, Brooklyn.
- Aller Retour Paris, a weeklong symposium (May 4–12, 2014) based at the Shakespeare and Company bookstore in Paris, celebrating the city's role in shaping Henry Miller as a writer.
- Big Sur Sound and Story (2014), an outdoor audio listening series curated by purveyors of fiction and documentary audio.
- Under the Persimmon Tree (2015), a weekly series that include listening to audio from library archives as well as conducting interviews with community members and visitors.
- Nowhere is Our Real Home (2016), a speaker series exploring the effects of development and tourism on rural communities.

Previous musical performers include Philip Glass, Laurie Anderson, Arcade Fire, Henry Rollins, Fleet Foxes, Flaming Lips, and Yo La Tengo.
