= Quiet Days in Clichy (novel) =

1956 novella by Henry Miller

- First edition cover, Paris, 1956
- Author: Henry Miller
- Language: English
- Genre: Autobiographical novel
- Publisher: Olympia Press; Grove Press
- Publication date: 1956
- Publication place: France
- Media type: Print
- Pages: 154
- Preceded by: Plexus
- Followed by: Big Sur and the Oranges of Hieronymus Bosch

Quiet Days in Clichy is a novella written by Henry Miller. It is based on his experience as a Parisian expatriate in the early 1930s, when he and Alfred Perlès shared a small apartment in suburban Clichy as struggling writers (at 4 Avenue Anatole-France). It takes place around the time Miller was writing Black Spring. According to his photographer friend George Brassaï, Miller admitted the title is "completely misleading".

== Plot ==
The plot follows Joey, an American expatriate in and around Place Clichy. The book is divided in two parts. In the first, Joey and his equally destitute roommate Carl search for food and navigate relationships with various women. Chiefly, Joey with Nys, a prostitute he meets at the Café Wepler near Montmartre, and Carl with Colette, a fifteen-year-old runaway who moves in with them before eventually being retrieved by her parents.

The second half, "Mara-Marignon", describes Carl's volatile love affair with the married Eliane, and Joey's relationship with Mara, a prostitute he meets on the Champs-Élysées. Mara reminds Joey of a previous lover, the married Christine, whom he regrets not marrying himself. This leads to a recollection of an evening he and Carl spent at their home with an acrobat named Corinne and a Danish woman named Christine. The four of them have a spontaneous orgy, which upsets Christine, who is laughed at by the other three.

== Writing and publication ==
The thin volume was initially written in New York shortly after Miller's return from Paris in 1940, and revised in Big Sur in 1956, while he was working on Nexus. The book was first published in France by Olympia Press in 1956. Following Miller's victory in the obscenity trial for Tropic of Cancer, Quiet Days in Clichy was finally published in the United States by Grove Press in 1965.

== Adaptations ==
The novella has twice been made into a feature film. The 1970 version was a Danish production, written and directed by Jens Jørgen Thorsen, and featuring a soundtrack by Country Joe McDonald.

The second film, Quiet Days in Clichy, mostly in English with some bits of French, was released in 1990. It was directed by Claude Chabrol and starred Andrew McCarthy as Miller. McCarthy was 26 years old when he played Miller, who is in his early 40s in the book. Chabrol deemed the film a not-too-faithful rendering of the novella.

In an HBO anthology series based on American literature, Women & Men 2: In Love There Are No Rules (1991), one of the shorts is “Mara,” based on the second half of Quiet Days in Clichy. The 30-minute film was directed by Mike Figgis. It stars Scott Glenn as Miller and Juliette Binoche as Mara.

== See also ==
- Quiet Days in Clichy (1970 film) (1970 Danish film based on the novella)
- Quiet Days in Clichy (1990 film) (1990 French film based on the novella)
- Henry & June (1990 film about Miller's relationship with Anaïs Nin)
- The Diary of Anaïs Nin, Volume One: 1931–1934 (Throughout the first volume of her journal, Nin writes of times spent with Miller and Perlès at their apartment in Clichy.)
