= Fragmentos De Una Tarde Somnolienta =

EP by Hacia Dos Veranos
- Released: 2005
- Recorded: December 19, 2003 in Estudio Tecson
- Genre: Post-rock, Indie
- Length: 13:06
- Label: MuyModerna Records (Argentina); I Wish I Was Unpopular Records (Europe)

Hacia Dos Veranos chronology
Fragmentos De Una Tarde Somnolienta (2005)	De Los Valles y Volcanes (2007)

Fragmentos De Una Tarde Somnolienta is the first EP edited by the Argentine post-rock band Hacia Dos Veranos, released in 2005 in Argentina by MuyModerna Records and in England and Singapore in February 2006 by I Wish I Was Unpopular Records. The EP was released under a Creative Commons license and until July 2007 was available for download on the band's website.

The three tracks included in the EP will later become part of their first full-length album De Los Valles y Volcanes.

== Track listing ==
1. "Preludio" (5:08)
2. "Sueño" (6:01)
3. "Despertar" (1:57)

All tracks were composed and arranged by Ignacio Aguiló, Diego Martínez and Sebastián Henderson.

== Notes ==
- Mixed in Estudio El Árbol by Juan Stewart and Hacia Dos Veranos.

== Performers ==
- Ignacio Aguiló: guitar
- Diego Martínez: bass
- Julia Bayse: flute, keyboards
- Andrés Edelstein: drums
