= Frederick W. Turner =

American historian

Frederick W. Turner (sometimes Frederick Turner), born in Chicago in 1937, is an American writer of history, including an acclaimed biography of the naturalist John Muir, and historical novels. He has published a revised and annotated edition of Geronimo's 1906 autobiography.

Turner received a National Endowment for the Arts Fellowship in 1976 and a Guggenheim Fellowship in 1981.

== Fiction ==
Since the turn of the 21st century, Turner has published three novels:

- 1929: A Novel of the Jazz Age (2003), based on the life of the musician Bix Beiderbecke, described as "an invigorating picture of what life was like for jazz musicians in the years leading up to the Great Depression."
- Redemption (2006), set in New Orleans' red light district in 1913
- The Go-Between: A Novel of the Kennedy Years (2010), a fictional journalist's exploration of Judith Campbell Exner's role between the John F. Kennedy White House and figures of the Chicago Mob.
- The Kid and Me (2018), a novel "Narrated by George Coe, an aged veteran of New Mexico’s Lincoln County War but now a devout painter of village churches, The Kid and Me tells what it felt like to ride alongside Billy the Kid, whom Coe both admired and greatly feared. Gang loyalty, extreme violence, political corruption in the highest places, and profound moral ambiguity characterize this tale of what made the American West wild."

== Nonfiction ==
Turner's earlier works were histories and biographies, particularly of figures and periods of the American West:

- Beyond Geography: The Western Spirit Against the Wilderness (1980) was described as a "provocative but unbalanced" account of the devastation caused by European settlers in North America.
- Rediscovering America: John Muir in His Time and Ours (1985) is a biography of Scottish-born naturalist John Muir which the Journal of American History called "excellent and insightful" and Environmental History Review likewise called "excellent," noting that Turner had done research in the papers of Muir newly available at the University of the Pacific. A review in Forest & Conservation History called it the best work on Muir to date, noting that two other biographies had recently been published. In a review of a new 2008 biography of the naturalist, Silas Chamberlin noted Turner's book as "the last great work on Muir."
- Spirit of Place: The Making of An American Literary Landscape (1990). Turner reviews nine American writers and locales they portrayed in their works, writing about his own sense of the places.
- A Border of Blue: Along the Gulf of Mexico From the Keys to the Yucatan (1993), a travelogue, was described by Entertainment Weekly as "sober and formal" prose which "often paints his own unease more clearly than the surrounding terrain".
- When the Boys Came Back: Baseball and 1946 (1996) focused on the season when Americans such as Joe DiMaggio returned from World War II to the baseball fields; Kirkus said it "could be livelier" but was still of interest.
- Geronimo: His Own Story: The Autobiography of a Great Patriot Warrior (1996) is a revised edition, with Turner's introduction and notes, based on the 1906 autobiography of the Native American leader Geronimo as told to S.M. Barrett.
- Renegade: Henry Miller and the Making of Tropic of Cancer (2011) sheds light on the creation of Henry Miller's infamous 1934 novel. The Wall Street Journal called it "an entertaining and skillful evocation of the time when Miller's memoir of bottom-feeding American expats in Paris was known as the dirtiest book in the world."
