= De Los Valles y Volcanes =

Studio album by Hacia Dos Veranos
- Released: 2007
- Recorded: Estudio Tecson, Estudio El Árbol and Estudio Concreto, Argentina
- Genre: Post-rock, Indie
- Length: 43:39
- Label: Scatter Records

Hacia Dos Veranos chronology
Fragmentos De Una Tarde Somnolienta (2005)	De Los Valles y Volcanes (2007)

Professional ratings
Review scores
Source	Rating
Diario Clarín	(Favorable)
Diario La Nación	(Favorable)
Global-Art.com	(Favorable)

De Los Valles y Volcanes is the first full-length album of the Argentine post-rock band Hacia Dos Veranos released in May 2007 by Scatter Records.

== Track list ==
1. 24:00 (4:19)
2. Preludio (5:12)
3. Sueño (6:00)
4. La Última Tarde Del Apicultor (4:16)
5. Maleficio (6:16)
6. Orillas Del Aluminé (2:35)
7. Despertar (1:56)
8. De Los Valles y Volcanes (9:33)
9. Verano (3:32)
- All tracks were arranged and composed by Ignacio Aguiló, Diego Martínez and Sebastián Henderson.

== Notes ==
- Tracks Preludio, Sueño and Despertar, were recorded by Sebastián Rilo in Estudio Tecson.
- Track La Última Tarde Del Apicultor was recorded by Juan Stewart in Estudio El Árbol.
- Tracks 24:00, Maleficio, Orillas Del Aluminé, De Los Valles y Volcanes and Verano were recorded by Norman McLoughlin in Estudio Concreto.
- Mixed by Juan Stewart and Hacia Dos Veranos in Estudio El Árbol.
- Cover design was in charge of Santiago Schroeder with collaboration of Mauricio Heredia.
- The Enhanced CD features the videoclip of the track Preludio, which was directed by Mariano Baez and Franco Estrubia.

== Performers ==
=== Hacia Dos Veranos ===
- Ignacio Aguiló: guitar
- Diego Martínez: bass
- Julia Bayse: flute, keyboards
- Andrés Edelstein: drums

=== Others musicians ===
- Ignacio Gabriel: Farfisa keyboard on tracks Maleficio, De Los Valles y Volcanes and Verano.
