= Quiet Days in Clichy (1990 film) =

1990 film by Claude Chabrol

- Directed by: Claude Chabrol
- Screenplay by: Claude Chabrol; Ugo Leonzio
- Based on: Quiet Days in Clichy by Henry Miller
- Produced by: Pietro Innocenzi; Antonio Passalia
- Starring: Andrew McCarthy; Nigel Havers; Barbara De Rossi
- Cinematography: Jean Rabier
- Edited by: Monique Fardoulis
- Music by: Jean-Michel Bernard; Luigi Ceccarelli; Matthieu Chabrol
- Production companies: AZ Film Production; Cinecittà; Italfrance Films; Direkt-Film; Istituto Luce; Cofimage 2
- Distributed by: Pathé Europa
- Release date: 9 May 1990
- Running time: 120 minutes
- Countries: France; Italy; Germany
- Language: English

Quiet Days in Clichy (French: "Jours tranquilles à Clichy") is a 1990 erotic drama film directed by Claude Chabrol. It is based on the 1956 autobiographical novel Quiet Days in Clichy by Henry Miller.

The novel was previously adapted into a 1970 Danish film.

== Plot ==
American Henry Miller enjoys a wide variety of sexual escapades while also working hard to establish himself as a serious writer in Paris.

== Cast ==
Actor	Role
Andrew McCarthy	Henry Miller / Joey
Nigel Havers	Alfred Perlès / Karl
Barbara De Rossi	Nys
Stéphanie Cotta	Colette Ducarouge
Isolde Barth	Ania Regentag
Anna Galiena	Edith
Stéphane Audran	Adrienne
Mario Adorf	Ernest Regentag
Elide Melli	
Margit Evelyn Newton	Bernadette
Eva Grimaldi	Yvonne
Giuditta del Vecchio	Yoko
Thomas Chabrol	A Guest

== Critical reception ==
Blu-ray.com, "I much prefer Danish director Jens Jørgen Thorsen's rougher take on Henry Miller's famous novel. Claude Chabrol's film is too handsome and often too elegant, lacking the proper spirit. It is worth seeing, but the 1970 film is clearly the better one."
