= The Black Book (Durrell novel) =

1938 novel by Lawrence Durrell

- First edition cover
- Author: Lawrence Durrell
- Language: English
- Series: The Villa Seurat Series
- Publisher: Obelisk Press
- Publication date: 1938
- Publication place: France
- Media type: Print (Paperback)
- Preceded by: Panic Spring
- Followed by: Cefalu

The Black Book is a novel by Lawrence Durrell, published in 1938 by the Obelisk Press.

== Plot ==
Now living on a Greek island, Lawrence Lucifer (not named until halfway through the novel) recounts his formative year in the Regina Hotel in England. The disjointed and dreamlike narrative expands on the theme of dying English culture. Overwhelmed by the rush of details and ideas, Lawrence is unable to embark upon a plan of action to improve society or even himself. His flights of imagination employ mythic and literary motifs of birth, death, drowning, crucifixion, with copulation and frank sexual descriptions chief among these. Furthermore, the story’s chronology is intentionally disrupted through ambiguous tense—the “gnomic aorist” is referenced—and “magical” facts.

These surrealistic asides are woven into the episodic encounters with the other characters in Lawrence’s life: residents of the Regina and the colleagues and students at the school where he works. They include Tarquin, an undiscovered writer who struggles with his own sexual identity. The Peruvian cartographer Lobo attempts to overcome his Catholic inhibitions to form relationships with numerous women, including Miss Smith, an African woman whom Lawrence helps to read Chaucer; Lawrence finds her exotic speech and manners meaningful to counteract the stiff coolness of English manners. Chamberlain disdains the “desire” that Lawrence and Tarquin often debate, opting instead for carnal experience with his own wife, Dinah. Morgan is a Welsh veteran of the Great War, a custodian in the hotel’s boiler room with practicable working-class insights.

Two other characters are key to Lawrence’s story. One is the unnamed woman (often referred to simply in the second person) whom Lawrence addresses, often when driving in the countryside at night (sometimes in a car borrowed from “Durrell”). The other is the novel’s secondary narrator, the writer Herbert “Death” Gregory. Gregory resided in the hotel before Lawrence’s arrival, and Lawrence consults and quotes Gregory’s diary (written in green ink) at length. At times, the two writers’ conclusions and reactions resemble each other in spirit and theme, enhancing the novel’s enigmatic stream of consciousness.

In addition to encounters with the same cast of hotel residents found in Lawrence’s narrative, Gregory’s plot arc mainly concerns his relationship with the tubercular Grace, a waiflike working-class woman he rescued one winter night. As his kept woman, her bourgeois tendencies (a love of dancing and Gary Cooper) both fascinate and disgust him, as he remains committed to his own writer’s bohemian life. When the hotel’s busybodies threaten to have the pair expelled from the hotel, they marry, at which point Gregory resents Grace’s attempts to redecorate his apartment and shun his unconventional friends. Soon, however, she succumbs to her disease. Alone, Gregory sees his salvation in pursuing a perfectly conventional middle-class life with Kate, a widowed waitress he meets in the town where Grace died.

Lawrence, likewise finding it necessary to leave the cold and lifeless existence of England, rejects Gregory’s “quaint suicide.” Instead, he bids farewell to his hotel acquaintances and journeys to Greece with his unnamed female lover. The novel ends as it began, with Lawrence overlooking the Ionian Sea, recording the data of his experiences, waiting for his meaning to be born from his self-exile.

== Publishing history ==
Faber and Faber offered to publish the novel in an expurgated edition, but on the advice of Henry Miller, Durrell declined. It was published in the Villa Seurat Series along with Henry Miller's Max and the White Phagocytes and Anaïs Nin's Winter of Artifice.

Although published in 1938, Durrell wrote the novel primarily over a 16-month period from September 1935 until December 1936. The novel shows several surrealist influences, and these may be in part related to materials from the 1936 London International Surrealist Exhibition, about which Henry Miller was sending Durrell materials from Herbert Read.

The initial publication was in Paris as its sexual content prohibited publication at that time in England. It was published in the US in 1960 but not published in Great Britain until 1973, following the successful courtroom defense of D. H. Lawrence's Lady Chatterley's Lover.

== Reception ==
In reviewing it in The Observer, Philip Toynbee wrote,

This is a wild, passionate, brilliantly gaudy and flamboyant extravaganza; it is intrinsically and essentially, the book of a young man – Durrell was 24 when he wrote it – richly obscene, energetically morbid, very often very funny indeed, self-pitying, but, above all, stylistically and verbally inventive as no other young man's novel of the period was even attempting to be.

Durrell told an interviewer that when he arrived in London in 1937, at Victoria Station, after a long period abroad, the first thing Hugh Gordon Porteus said to him was that Wyndham Lewis would 'have it in for him', because of the 'portrait' of Lewis in The Black Book. Durrell replied that he had never met Wyndham Lewis.
