= Mary Dearborn =

American biographer and author

Mary Dearborn is an American biographer and author. Dearborn has published biographies of Norman Mailer, Henry Miller, Peggy Guggenheim and others.

Dearborn received a Ph.D. in English and comparative literature from Columbia University in 1984.

== Career ==
After the publication of her 2017 biography of Ernest Hemingway, Dearborn wrote a critical essay regarding his antisemitism. She reflected on her experience writing, where many sources sought to decrease the extent of his prejudices due to the time period. She emphasized that she did not believe the antisemitism was reason to stop reading his works, but instead provided another perspective to study his work from.

Dearborn's biography Carson McCullers: A Life, was published in 2024. It is the first notable biography of Carson McCullers written in more than 20 years. Dearborn explored aspects of McCullers that had never been examined before especially after comparison to 1976 biography The Lonely Hunter by Virginia Spencer Carr. In an article for Lit Hub, Dearborn described McCullers' career as creating "what may be American literature’s most detailed, carefully observed picture of what it means to be an outsider.There is a newfound brilliance in Dearborn's deep dive into every aspect of McCuller's difficulties and creativity."

== Works ==
=== Biographies ===
- Pocahontas's Daughters: Gender and Ethnicity in American Culture (1986)
- Love in the Promised Land: The Story of Anzia Yezierska and John Dewey (1988)
- The Happiest Man Alive: A Biography of Henry Miller (1991)
- Queen of Bohemia: The Life of Louise Bryant (1996)
- Mailer: A Biography (1999)
- Mistress of Modernism: The Life of Peggy Guggenheim (2004)
- Ernest Hemingway: A Biography (2017)
- Carson McCullers: A Life (2024)

=== Introductions ===
- Henry Miller, Crazy Cock (1991)
- Henry Miller, Moloch: or, This Gentile World (1992)
