= The Rosy Crucifixion =

Novel by Henry Miller

- First American printing of Plexus, 1965
- Author: Henry Miller
- Language: English
- Genre: Autobiographical novel
- Publisher: Obelisk Press; Grove Press
- Publication date: Sexus - 1949; Plexus - 1953; Nexus - 1959
- Publication place: United States
- Pages: 1,462

The Rosy Crucifixion, a trilogy consisting of Sexus, Plexus, and Nexus, is a fictionalized account documenting the six-year period of Henry Miller's life in Brooklyn as he falls for his second wife June and struggles to become a writer, leading up to his initial departure for Paris in 1928. The title comes from a sentence near the end of Miller's Tropic of Capricorn: "All my Calvaries were rosy crucifixions, pseudo-tragedies to keep the fires of hell burning brightly for the real sinners who are in danger of being forgotten."

== Sexus ==
Sexus (1949), the first volume, describes the break-up of Miller's first marriage to Maude as he meets, falls in love with and marries his second wife, the captivating and mysterious dancer Mona (June). All the while, he feels guilty for leaving Maude, and becomes more attracted to her following their divorce. At the beginning of Sexus, Miller is 33 years old. June is at first called Mara, but at the beginning of chapter 8, and for the remainder of the trilogy, her name is changed to Mona. Miller states that this is under the influence of his friend Dr. Kronski, and that the name change accompanied "other, more significant changes." She is one who has changed many details of her life: "her name, her birthplace, her mother, her upbringing, her friends, her tastes, even her desires."

The New York Times stated, "Miller uses licentious sex scenes to set the stage for his philosophical discussions of self, love, marriage and happiness."

Miller said that, in a burst of inspiration one night in 1927, he stayed up all night plotting out Tropic of Capricorn (1939) and The Rosy Crucifixion in forty or fifty typewritten pages. He began writing Sexus in New York in 1942, then set it aside until picking it back up in 1947 while living in Big Sur. It was first put out in Paris as two volumes by Obelisk Press in 1949. It created a big stir, and was banned the following year, with the publisher fined and given a prison sentence.

== Plexus ==
Plexus (1953), the second volume, continues with the story of Miller's marriage to Mona, and covers Miller's attempts to become a writer after leaving his job at the Cosmodemonic Telegraph Company. It was first published in English in 1953 by Olympia Press as a two-volume set.

== Nexus ==
In Nexus (1959), the final installment, Miller finds himself an outsider in his own marriage, as Mona's relationship with Anastasia (Jean Kronski) grows, with the pair finally abandoning Miller to travel to Paris. After Mona's return on her own, the trilogy ends with Miller and his wife departing for Paris.

Miller had in mind to write a second volume of Nexus, and made several attempts to complete it. It would have covered his time in France with Mona, their return to New York, and his return to Paris on his own, concluding with him writing the opening lines of Tropic of Cancer at 18 Villa Seurat. He made several attempts to write the book before ultimately abandoning the undertaking. A rough draft of the abandoned novel, Paris 1928 (Nexus II), an account of his 1928 trip to Paris with Mona, was first published in English in 2012.

== Publication ==
The three books in the trilogy were initially banned in the United States, published only in France and Japan. Their American publication followed the U.S. Supreme Court's 1964 decision that the also-banned Tropic of Cancer was a work of literature and therefore should not be banned.

Miller was concerned about the publication of Sexus in the US. He felt that it was possible that his ex-wife Beatrice, the model for Maude, would bring a lawsuit for her portrayal in the novel. Despite Miller's reservations, all three volumes of The Rosy Crucifixion were published by Grove Press in the US in the summer of 1965. They soon were holding the top spots on the Publishers Weekly best-seller list along with two more of Miller's books, the recently unbanned The World of Sex and Quiet Days in Clichy.

== Criticism ==
Miller's close friend, author Lawrence Durrell, was severely disappointed in Sexus. In a letter dated September 5, 1949, he wrote that Miller was lost "in this shower of lavatory filth which no longer seems tonic and bracing, but just excrementitious and sad."

"I am trying to reproduce in words a block of my life which to me has the utmost significance – every bit of it," Miller responded. "Since 1927 I have carried inside me the material of this book. Do you suppose it's possible that I could have a miscarriage after such a period of gestation? ... But Larry, I can never go back on what I've written. If it was not good, it was true; if it was not artistic, it was sincere; if it was in bad taste, it was on the side of life."

== See also ==
- Le Monde's 100 Books of the Century
