= Quiet Days in Clichy (1970 film) =

1970 Danish film by Jens Jørgen Thorsen

- Danish theatrical release poster
- Directed by: Jens Jørgen Thorsen
- Written by: Henry Miller (novel)
- Produced by: Klaus Pagh
- Starring: Paul Valjean; Wayne Rodda; Ben Webster
- Cinematography: Jesper Høm
- Music by: Country Joe McDonald; Ben Webster; Young Flowers
- Release date: 1 June 1970
- Running time: 91 min
- Country: Denmark
- Language: English / French

Quiet Days in Clichy (Danish: Stille dage i Clichy; also known as Not So Quiet Days), is a 1970 Danish film written and directed by Jens Jørgen Thorsen and starring Paul Valjean and Wayne Rodda. Set in Paris, it features music by Country Joe McDonald and Ben Webster. Drawn from the semi-autobiographical 1956 novel by Henry Miller, updated from the 1930s to the 1960s, it gives reflections on and incidents in the lives of two young men sharing an apartment. The amount of nudity, sexual activity and crude language in the film has restricted its public showing in many countries.

== Plot ==
The American writer Joey and his European friend Carl share an apartment in the Clichy-sous-Bois district of Paris in the late 1960s. What spare time and money they have is mostly spent pursuing women.

A surrealist artist comes to their apartment, offers her services and paints slogans over the walls of the bathroom. In a café, Joey meets the amiable Nys and they go to a hotel. In the street afterwards, when she asks for money he gives her all he has got. Left with nothing for his dinner, he roams the streets of the city in increasing hunger and distress. Returning in despair to the empty apartment, he is reduced to picking stale food out of the bin. Trying vainly to sleep, he is woken by Carl who has brought back Colette, an underage runaway to whom they give a home. Joey has further dates with Nys, without charge because she enjoys his company. Colette's parents eventually track her down and reclaim her, telling Carl and Joey they will not inform the police so long as the two never see the girl again.

Thinking it prudent to leave France for a while, the two men take a train to Luxembourg which they find picturesque but dull. When a bar owner tells them that Jews are excluded from his establishment, they beat him up and return quickly to Paris. There Joey meets the exotic Mara, who claims to have had a brilliant career in Costa Rica but is temporarily reduced to prostituting herself on the Champs-Élysées. Carl brings back two prostitutes from a jazz bar, both called Christine, and the five have a wild night. Later, Carl and Joey have fun with two Danish visitors, one of whom keeps proclaiming her unavailability because she is a married woman with two children.

== Cast ==
- Paul Valjean as Joey
- Wayne Rodda as Carl
- Ulla Koppel as Nys
- Lisbet Lundquist as Jeanne
- Elsebeth Reingaard as Colette
- Olaf Ussing as father
- Noemie Roos as mother
- Ben Webster as himself
- Avi Sagild as Mara
- Susanne Krage as Christine
- Louise White as surrealist
- Petronella as Adrienne

== Critical reception ==
The Monthly Film Bulletin wrote: "Though visually fluid and inventive, and capitalising on some attractive music from Country Joe McDonald, Jens Jorgen Thorsen's version of Henry Miller's Paris-set autobiographical novel never does enough to alleviate the sheer repetitiveness of its source material. As one scene of copulation succeeds another and the two heroes work their way through an inexhaustible supply of easy lays, it's hard to know who is more dehumanised by the whole procedure: the girls, reduced to grinningly acquiescent playthings; or the men, whom Paul Valjean (as the balding, bespectacled Miller counterpart) and Wayne John Rodda endow with little life beyond the unquenchable priapic glint in their eyes. The resulting experience, not enhanced by poorly post-synchronised dialogue, is distinctly stultifying."

== See also ==
- Quiet Days in Clichy (1990 film)
