= Hilaire Hiler =

American painter

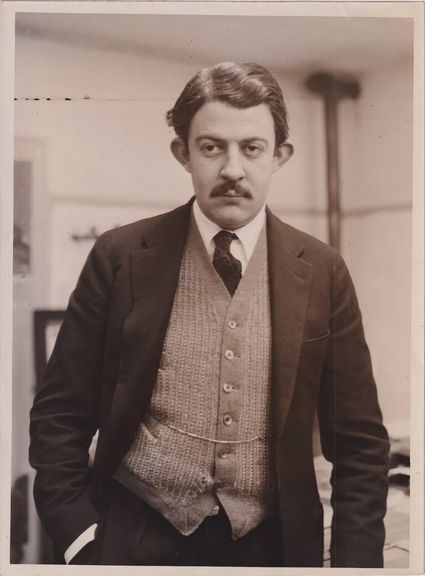
- Photo portrait in Paris (1930)
- Born: Hilaire Harzberg Hiler; July 16, 1898; St. Paul, Minnesota
- Died: January 19, 1966 (aged 67); Neuilly-sur-Seine, Hauts-de-Seine, France
- Known for: Painter
- Movement: Modernism, Structuralism

Hilaire Harzberg Hiler (July 16, 1898 – January 19, 1966) was an American artist, psychologist, and color theoretician who worked in Europe and United States during the mid-20th century. At home and abroad, Hiler worked as a muralist, jazz musician, costume and set designer, teacher, and author. He was best known for combining his artistic and psychoanalytical training to formulate an original perspective on color.

== Biography ==
Hilaire Hiler was born in St. Paul, Minnesota in 1898, and he grew up in Providence, Rhode Island.

Hiler attended a number of schools as a young man, including Rhode Island School of Design classes for children, and a brief attendance at Wharton School of Finance and Commerce to appease his father. Although he was told by multiple instructors to give up art based on his struggles with drawing, he pursued his interests by attending Pennsylvania Academy of the Fine Arts, Pennsylvania School of Industrial Art, University of Pennsylvania, University of Denver, University of Paris, and Golden State University.

The San Francisco Maritime Museum Mural (1936)

As an expatriate living in Paris in the 1920s, Hiler became friends with the literary crowd of Henry Miller, Sinclair Lewis, Ernest Hemingway, and Anaïs Nin. Miller referred to the man as "a hilarious painter whom I always think of with hilarious glee." Hiler had broad academic, artistic, and social interests; he occupied himself painting interior murals, performing jazz piano at nightclubs—often with his pet monkey, studying remote cultures, writing books and magazine articles, designing theater costumes and sets, and carousing with his friends. He left Paris in 1934, but not before seeing a therapist to improve his speech and undergoing surgery to make his ears less prominent.

Hiler was also an avid costume book collector, being rumored to own one of the world's best costume book libraries at the time of his death. He and his father, Meyer Hiler, jointly compiled a Bibliography of Costume in 1939, published through H. W. Wilson Company.

In 1940, he helped found the Fremont College in Los Angeles, which moved with Hiler to Santa Fe in 1944.

== Artwork and color theory ==
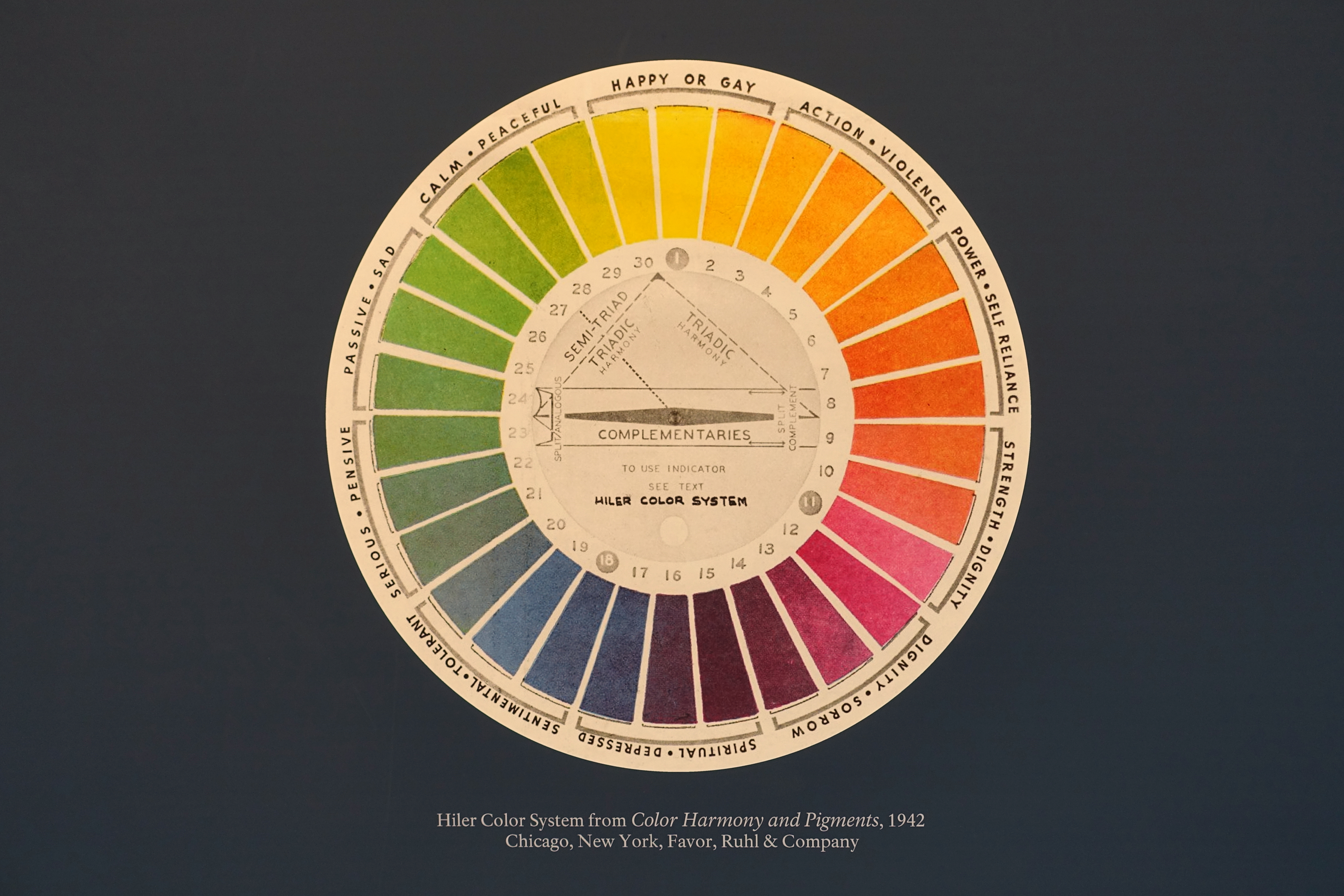
Hiler Color System

After returning to the United States, Hiler was named art director of the bathhouse building at the San Francisco Aquatic Park from 1936 to 1939, a major WPA project for which the bathhouse building (commonly known as the San Francisco Maritime Museum) was to be the centerpiece. In addition to directing the overall design of the Streamline Moderne building, he created two full-room murals within the Maritime Museum. The first, in the main hall of the museum, recalls a playful, hallucinogenic dip into a richly populated aquatic landscape, and the other elucidates his color theories in the form of a circular, 120-color spectrum on the ceiling. When Henry Miller saw the aquarium-themed mural, he was so impressed that he considered it to be the only mural worth seeing in the United States.

Miller subsequently asked Hiler to tutor him in art, an experience which influenced his novel Black Spring. The scenes depicted in the sub-aqueous painting present a fantastical blend architectural elements and mythical creatures, transporting viewers to the lost cities Mu and Atlantis.

Hiler's most notable achievements revolved around his study of how color and the human psyche interact. His ceiling mural at the Maritime Museum represents his deduction of 30 sensational—rather than mathematical—color relationships in the form of a wheel, as well as their combinations with black, white, and gray. He titled the room "The Prismatarium", as it was intended to open up the world of color to viewers in the same way that a planetarium opens up the realm of outer space. The Hiler color spectrum varies from the familiar color wheel that developed in the 18th and 19th centuries following Sir Isaac Newton's documentation of the color proportions found in a rainbow. This color wheel presents red, blue, and yellow as the primary colors situated opposite their complementary colors of green, orange, and violet, respectively, and the variations between each color could be endless.

By contrast, Hiler's spectrum is based on ten color groups: yellow, orange, orange-red, red, purple, blue, turquoise, sea green, green, and leaf green. Each group contains three variations, yielding the 30-step wheel. More steps then this would be indiscernible to the human eye, according to Hiler's "Threshold Theory." This theory also dictates the need for proportionally more gradations from violet to blue, and green to yellow. "Color in painting is a psychological problem, not a problem in physics", he states in his 1942 book Color Harmony and Pigments. In other words, the human eye and mind are better prepared to perceive differences in the cool colors than in the warm colors, regardless of the proportion of gradations that may be physically present. Adding to each color black to create "tones," white to create "hues," and gray to create "shades," yields 120 colors that provide an outline for "every color in the whole world." Hiler's artwork, including the aquatic mural at the Maritime Museum is directly based on this color foundation.

Throughout his career, Hiler moved more towards abstract imagery. By the 1940s, his theories on color and abstraction developed into a movement which he termed "Structuralism."

== See also ==
- Sargent Johnson
- Benny Bufano
- New Deal
