= Alfred Perlès =

Austrian writer (1897–1990)

Alfred Perlès (1897–1990) was an Austrian writer (in later life a British citizen), who was most famous for his associations with Henry Miller, Lawrence Durrell, and Anaïs Nin.

== Life and works ==
Born in Vienna in 1897, to Czech Jewish parents, Perlès struggled as a writer in Paris during his early 1930s, where he worked for a while for the Paris office of the Chicago Tribune. In 1933, American writer Henry Miller – not yet known – took an apartment with Perlès in Clichy. Miller wrote of this experience in his book Quiet Days in Clichy (1956, orig. written 1940), in which the character "Carl" is based on Perlès. Other Miller works about Perlès in Paris include his early What Are You Going To Do About Alf?, and a letter to Perlès in Aller Retour New York.

By 1936, Perlès was part of a vibrant Parisian literary scene that included Miller, Lawrence Durrell, and Anaïs Nin, as well as Antonin Artaud, Michael Fraenkel, Hans Reichel and others. Anaïs Nin writes that she first met Alfred Perlès in April, 1932. Miller and Durrell often referred to Perlès as "Joe" or "Joey". Some of these writers were featured in a magazine called The Booster, which Perlès co-published in 1936, along with Miller, Durrell, and Nin. In 1939, with the start of World War II the group broke apart, as Miller moved on to Greece and Perlès fled to England (where he applied for, and was granted, British citizenship). A few years later, Perlès wrote a piece about this pre-War circle in Henry Miller at Villa Seurat (featured in The Happy Rock anthology, 1945, and republished by the Village Press as a chapbook in 1973).

Perlès and Miller maintained a lifelong friendship. Miller visited Perlès in the UK and Perlès visited Miller in Big Sur, California, where he wrote My Friend Henry Miller (written in 1954/55). Miller wrote a tribute to Perlès in the memoir Joey.

Later in life, he lived with his Scottish wife Ann, in a borrowed house in Kyrenia, Northern Cyprus but they were forced to leave at the time of the Turkish invasion in 1974 moving to England, where they lived in a modest house on a redbrick housing estate in the town of Wells, Somerset from where they made regular visits to the Cotswolds to meet the poet and writer P.J. Kavanagh and the artist Laurence Whitfield, Kavanagh dedicating a poem to him, "Quieter than Clichy (for Fred Perles)", An Enchantment, Carcanet 1991. He changed his name to Alfred Barret. He died in 1990.

=== Other works ===
- Sentiments limitrophes (1936)
- Le quatuor en ré majeur (1938)
- The Renegade (1943)
- Alien Corn (1944)
- Round Trip (1946)
- Rathausplatz no. 16 (by Hedwig Borgner, Trans. Perlès, 1957)
- Art And Outrage (with Lawrence Durrell, 1959)
- Reunion in Big Sur (1959)
- My Friend Lawrence Durrell (1961)
- Scenes From A Floating Life (1968)
- My Friend Alfred Perlès: Coda to an Unfinished Autobiography (1973)
