= Cliche (surname) =

Cliche is a French surname. Notable people with the surname include:

- Anne Élaine Cliche (born 1959), Canadian writer
- David Cliche (1952–2020), Canadian politician
- Guillaume Cliche-Rivard, Canadian politician
- Karen Cliche, Canadian actress
- Lucien Cliche (1916–2005), Canadian politician
- Marc-André Cliche, Canadian ice hockey player
- Myriam Cliche (1961–2022), Canadian poet and illustrator
- Robert Cliche, Canadian lawyer, politician and judge
- Simon Cliche Trudeau, birth name of Loud (rapper) (born 1988), Canadian rapper
- Vital Cliche, Canadian politician
