= Black Spring (short story collection) =

1936 book of short stories by Henry Miller

- First edition cover, Paris, 1936
- Author: Henry Miller
- Language: English
- Genre: Autobiographical, short stories
- Publisher: Obelisk Press
- Publication date: 1936
- Publication place: France
- Media type: Print (hardcover)
- Preceded by: Tropic of Cancer
- Followed by: Tropic of Capricorn

Black Spring is a book of ten short stories by the American writer Henry Miller, published in 1936 by the Obelisk Press in Paris, France. Black Spring was Miller's second published book, following Tropic of Cancer and preceding Tropic of Capricorn. The book was written in 1932-33 while Miller was living in Clichy, Hauts-de-Seine (a.k.a. Clichy), a northwestern suburb of Paris. Like Tropic of Cancer, the book is dedicated to Anaïs Nin.

== Contents ==
The ten short stories in the book are:

1. The Fourteenth Ward
2. A Saturday Afternoon
3. Third or Fourth Day of Spring
4. The Angel is My Watermark!
5. The Tailor Shop
6. Jabberwhorl Cronstadt
7. Into the Night Life
8. Walking Up and Down in China
9. Burlesk
10. Megalopolitan Maniac

== Publication history ==
Black Spring was published by Obelisk Press in Paris in 1936; however, it was not published in the United States until 1963 due to obscenity laws. When the Grove Press “Black Cat” edition was released, several of the stories not considered obscene had already been published in other Miller volumes such as The Cosmological Eye, by New Directions. Several other stories had been published in New Directions’ annual, New Directions in Prose and Poetry.

== Miller on Black Spring ==
Miller, like his critics, had a high opinion of the book. In a 1949 recording, Miller says:

During the ten years I spent in Paris, I must have written seven or eight books. This one, Black Spring, I like the best of all I wrote during that period. It was a wonderful period of my life. The years 1932 and ’3, living outside Paris in the town of Clichy, where I wrote the book, I guess were the very best years of my whole life.

In The Books in My Life, after quoting the epigraph to Black Spring taken from Miguel de Unamuno, which reads

Can I be as I believe myself or as others believe me to be? Here is where these lines become confession in the presence of my unknown and unknowable me, unknown and unknowable for myself. Here is where I create the legend wherein I must bury myself,

Miller goes on to write, “These lines appear in the fly-leaf to Black Spring, a book which came nearer to being myself, I believe, than any book I have written before or since.”

The book Henry Miller on Writing includes a handwritten list of “commandments” (labeled “Work Schedule, 1932-33”) which hung above Miller’s desk with the second commandment being “Start no more new books, add no more new material to ‘Black Spring.’”

== Epigraphs ==
Each story in Black Spring (with the exception of “The Angel is My Watermark!”) begins with an epigraph taken from the respective story which to varying degrees sums up a major theme of the story. The epigraph for “The Tailor Shop" contains the phrase “always merry and bright,” which would become the title of Jay Martin's unauthorized biography of Miller. The epigraph for “Into the Night Life…” —being “A Coney Island of the Mind”—became the title of a volume of poetry by Lawrence Ferlinghetti.
