= The Air-Conditioned Nightmare =

1945 memoir by Henry Miller

- First edition cover, 1945
- Author: Henry Miller
- Language: English
- Genre: Memoir, nonfiction
- Publisher: New Directions
- Publication date: 1945
- Publication place: United States
- Media type: Print (Hardcover and Paperback)
- Pages: 292
- Preceded by: Sunday After the War
- Followed by: The Time of the Assassins: A Study of Rimbaud

The Air-Conditioned Nightmare is a 1945 memoir by Henry Miller about his year-long road trip across the United States in 1940, following his return from nearly a decade living in Paris.

== Background ==
Miller was born and raised in New York City, and moved to Paris in 1930, at the age of 38. He conceived of a book about traveling across the United States as early as 1935, after returning to Paris from a trip to New York. He wrote to Hilaire Hiler about plans for a book that would be "a loaded gun to the head of America."

By June 1940, his book on his time spent in Greece, The Colossus of Maroussi (which would ultimately be published by Colt Press in 1941), had been rejected by more than 10 publishers, severely disappointing Miller. His agent reminded him of his plan to travel around the U.S. and record his impressions, predicting that publishers would be eager for a book on an expatriate's return to his own land. Despite the fact that he had been writing autobiographical fiction, the idea of writing a nonfiction book appealed to Miller, especially since writers like Ernest Hemingway had occasionally ventured into nonfiction. Doubleday, Doran (as it was then known) commissioned the book in August 1940, giving Miller a $500 advance. He used part of the advance to purchase a 1932 Buick to use for his trip across the United States. He originally asked Anaïs Nin, who was then living in New York, to accompany him, but she declined. Instead, he was joined for much of the trip by the painter Abraham Rattner.

== Summary ==
Miller and Rattner left from New York in October 1940, driving south towards Florida before heading west. Miller brought along a few of his favorite books, including Mysteries by Knut Hamsun and Leaves of Grass by Walt Whitman. Miller wrote to Nin that he let Rattner do most of the driving, despite the fact that he considered himself the superior driver. They spent a night at Caresse Crosby's estate in Bowling Green, Virginia, where Salvador Dalí and his wife were also staying. Miller and Dalí did not get along, with Miller describing Dalí as vain. They later stopped in Jackson, Mississippi to visit the writer Eudora Welty.

During the trip, Miller briefly returned to New York several times, including for a month to see his ailing father, who died two hours before Miller's return. After the funeral, he resumed his trip. By the time they reached Atlanta, Miller wrote, he was getting more disgusted with America every day. He did enjoy Charleston and New Orleans, and found Southwestern sites such as the Grand Canyon mysterious and appealing. Overall, however, Miller did not form a favorable impression of America, considering it cruel and sterile. "Nowhere have I encountered such a dull, monotonous fabric of life as here in America," he writes in the book's opening pages. He criticizes America for not valuing its creative citizens and for making life miserable for them.

== Publication and reception ==
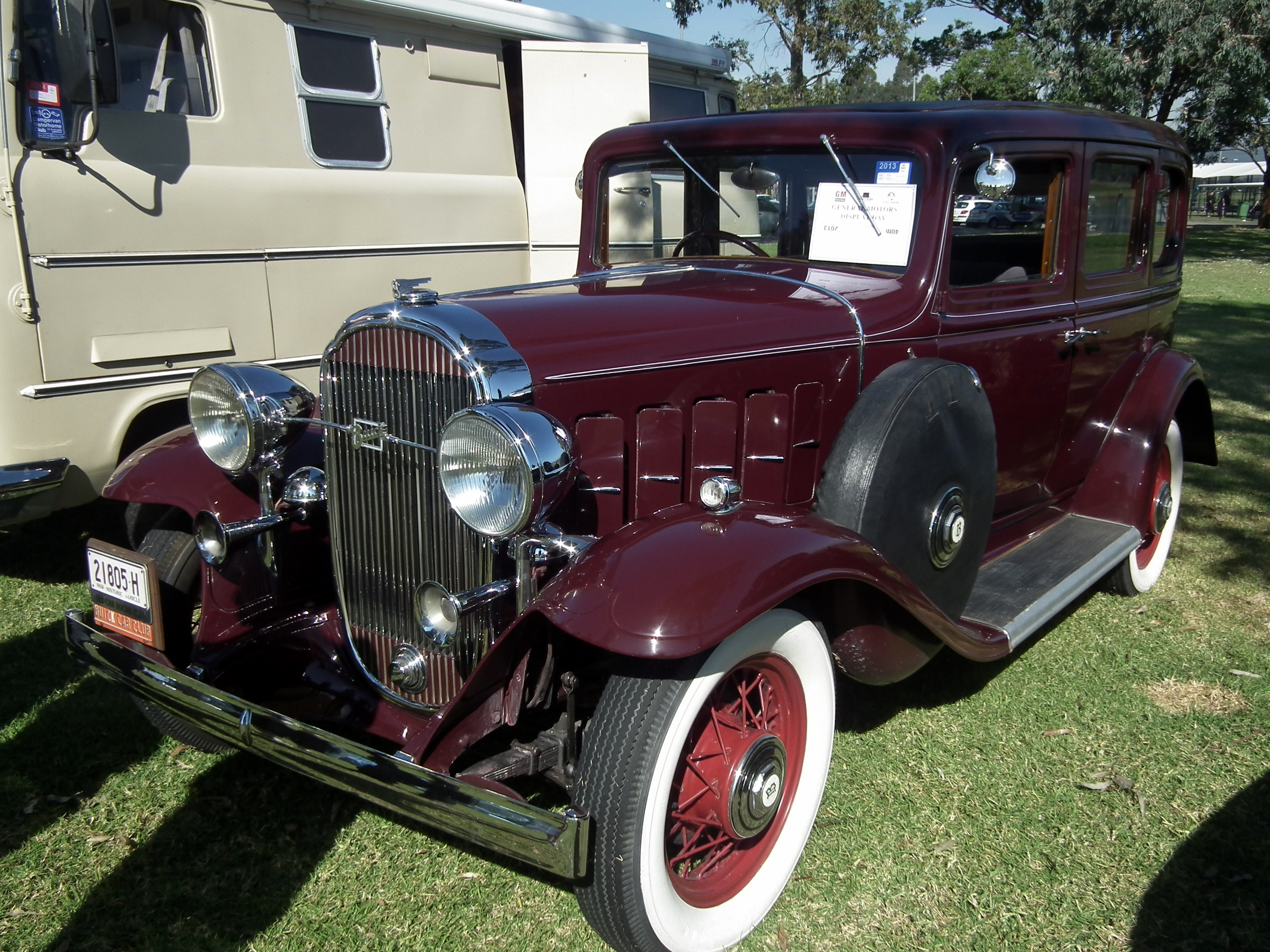
A 1932 Buick sedan, similar to the car Miller purchased for the trip.

Miller started writing the book in Detroit and wrote most of it in the summer of 1941 in Hollywood, California, where he completed the yearlong trip. It was rejected by Doubleday at the end of 1941, and Miller abandoned it until the end of World War II, when it was published by New Directions in 1945. Many of the book's chapters originally appeared in magazines and anthologies, including Town & Country, Quarterly Review of Literature and The Harvard Advocate.

Miller was concerned about the reception the book would get, given his negative impression of the US during a time when patriotism was in vogue. Prior to its publication, he told Lawrence Durrell it was "a wasted year." The book met with a generally poor reception. Reviewing it for the New York Times, Orville Prescott deemed it "as shallow, snobbish, uninformed, pretentious and monstrously egocentric a book as ever I read in my life," concluding that Miller doesn't know enough about America to write a book about it. Prescott admits, however, that some of Miller's descriptions are "extremely well done" and that "he can occasionally achieve a certain sardonic power."

== Second volume ==
In May 1947, Miller assembled a collection of short pieces for volume two of The Air-Conditioned Nightmare, which was published in November 1947 by New Directions under the title Remember to Remember. The collection of essays includes portraits of Miller's friends, assaults on the way of American life, and a long recollection of his years living in France. Miller had initially suggested titling the second volume The Egg in Its Prison or The Electrified Rat-Race; both titles were rejected by the publisher.

== In popular culture ==
British guitarist and ex-Genesis member Steve Hackett released an instrumental song named "The Air-Conditioned Nightmare" on his 1981 album Cured.

The American band Mr. Bungle have a song titled "The Air-Conditioned Nightmare" on their 1999 album California.

Doldrums, the alias of Canadian electronic musician Airick Woodhead, titled his 2015 release The Air Conditioned Nightmare, with the album's themes of disconnection and mankind vaguely linked to Miller's book of the same name.
