= Tropic of Capricorn (novel) =

1939 novel by Henry Miller

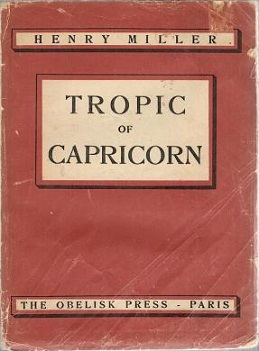
- First edition cover, Paris, 1939
- Author: Henry Miller
- Language: English
- Genre: Autobiographical novel
- Publisher: Obelisk Press
- Publication date: 1939
- Publication place: France
- Media type: Print (hardcover)
- Pages: 367
- Preceded by: Black Spring
- Followed by: The Colossus of Maroussi

Tropic of Capricorn is a semi-autobiographical novel by Henry Miller, first published by Obelisk Press in Paris in 1939. A prequel of sorts to Miller's first published novel, 1934's Tropic of Cancer, it was banned in the United States until a 1961 Justice Department ruling declared that its contents were not obscene.

== History ==
=== Writing ===
During a three-week vacation from Western Union in 1922, Miller wrote his first novel, Clipped Wings, a study of 12 Western Union messengers. It has never been published; only fragments remain, although parts of it were recycled in later works, including in the brief portraits of Western Union messengers in Tropic of Capricorn.

In the spring of 1927, Miller was living in the Brooklyn neighborhood of Brooklyn Heights with his second wife June Miller and her lover, Jean Kronski. He had recently obtained a new job working for the Parks Department. One day, he returned home to find a note saying they had taken a boat to Paris. Soon after, Miller moved back in with his parents in Brooklyn. One night in May 1927, Miller stayed at the Parks Department office after work and typed up a 32-page document he called June, outlining the details of their relationship. He would use the document as source material for Tropic of Capricorn as well as The Rosy Crucifixion trilogy. Miller would also repurpose numerous scenes into Tropic of Capricorn from his unpublished third novel Lucky Lesbians (later retitled Crazy Cock), which he worked on from 1928 to 1930; it was ultimately published in 1991 (over a decade after his death).

Miller began writing Tropic of Capricorn in earnest toward the end of 1933 while living in Paris. At the time, he was also writing Black Spring, and putting the finishing touches on Tropic of Cancer. Early on, he referred to Tropic of Capricorn as "the June book." His biographer Robert Ferguson called the book Miller's attempt at "retrieving in written form as much as possible of the disappearing past." Although referred to as "the June book," his second wife is more of an influence than a primary character, making only a short appearance. The book is dedicated "To Her," in reference to June.

=== Publication ===
Tropic of Capricorn was published in France, in English, by Obelisk Press in February 1939. A French translation appeared as Tropique du Capricorne in April 1946. Sales of the book, along with Tropic of Cancer, were boosted by the controversy surrounding their censorship, with complaints against Miller and his publisher on charges of pornography. In the 1940s and 1950s, Miller's books were hard to find and expensive. The banned books were occasionally smuggled into the US, although they were often seized by Customs. In 1944, accompanied by his soon-to-be third wife Janina Martha Lepska, Miller read excerpts from Tropic of Capricorn and Black Spring at the Library of Congress in Washington, DC.

Tropic of Capricorn was banned in the United States until a 1961 Justice Department ruling declared that its contents were not obscene. After Grove Press published the novel in the US in September 1962, Miller gained a new, younger generation of readers for his work, which coincided with the sexual revolution of the 1960s. He was seen by many as a champion of the new sexual freedom, and was endorsed by well-known literary figures of the time, including Allen Ginsberg, William S. Burroughs, and Jack Kerouac.

== Plot ==
The novel covers Miller's growing inability and outright refusal to accommodate what he sees as America's hostile environment. It is autobiographical but not chronological, jumping between Miller's adolescent adventures in Brooklyn in the 1900s, recollections of his first love Una Gifford, a love affair with his nearly 30-year-old piano teacher when he was 15, his unhappy marriage to his first wife Beatrice, his years working at Western Union (called The Cosmodemonic Telegraph Company in the book) in Manhattan in the 1920s, and his fateful meeting with his second wife June (known in the book as Mara), whom he credits with changing his life and making him into a writer.

The Rosy Crucifixion continues the story of June in greater detail, over the course of nearly 1,500 pages. It describes the process of Miller finding his voice as a writer, until eventually he sets off for Paris, where the activities depicted in Tropic of Cancer begin.
