= Obelisk Press =

English-language publisher based in Paris

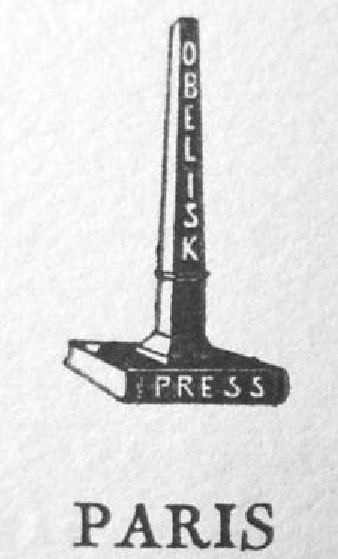

Obelisk Press was an English-language press based in Paris, founded by British publisher Jack Kahane in 1929.

Manchester-born novelist Kahane began the Obelisk Press after his publisher, Grant Richards, went bankrupt. Going into partnership with a printer — Herbert Clarke, owner of Imprimerie Vendôme — Kahane, as "Cecil Barr", published his next novel Daffodil under his own imprint in 1931. A writer and publisher of "db's" ("dirty books"), Kahane mixed serious work with smut in his list; he has been described as "a quite bizarre blend of ultra-sophisticated, avant-garde literary entrepreneur and, by the standards of his time, pornographer." He was able to take advantage of the fact that books published in France in English were not subject to the kind of censorship practised in Britain at the time. However, they were still subject to confiscation by British and US customs officers.

Kahane published Henry Miller's 1934 novel, Tropic of Cancer, which had explicit sexual passages and could not therefore be published in the United States; Obelisk published five more books by Miller, as well as Richard Aldington's Death of a Hero (1930), Anaïs Nin's Winter of Artifice (1939), Cyril Connolly's first book and only novel, The Rock Pool (1936), James Joyce's Haveth Childers Everywhere and Pomes Penyeach (1932), Frank Harris's My Life and Loves (1934) and Lawrence Durrell's The Black Book (1938), Squadron 95 by war hero Harold Buckley, James Hanley's Boy (1935) and Some Limericks by Norman Douglas. He reprinted Radclyffe Hall's The Well of Loneliness, which had been banned in Britain in 1928.

Kahane also published many forgotten authors, including Norah James, Canadian poet Laurence Bradford Dakin and Nadejda de Bragança.

Kahane's wife Marcelle and their son Maurice (later known as Maurice Girodias) worked as cover illustrators for the imprint.

Kahane died within days of the outbreak of World War II, having just finished his final book, on 3 September 1939. This book, Memoirs of a Booklegger, marked the end of Obelisk for several years, until his son (who took his mother's birth name, Girodias, during the war to evade detection as a Jew) briefly revived it in the years following the war. Selling in large quantities to the American G.I.s passing through Paris on their return home, Miller's best-known works were republished alongside other English-language books, such as Memoirs of Fanny Hill. Girodias also published a few important works in French including George Bataille's literary review Critique and Nikos Kazantzakis's Alexis Zorbas (1947). Girodias largely abandoned the Obelisk Press name when he discovered that new titles under the name would not sell and he founded the Olympia Press in 1953.
