= Henry Miller =

American novelist (1891–1980)

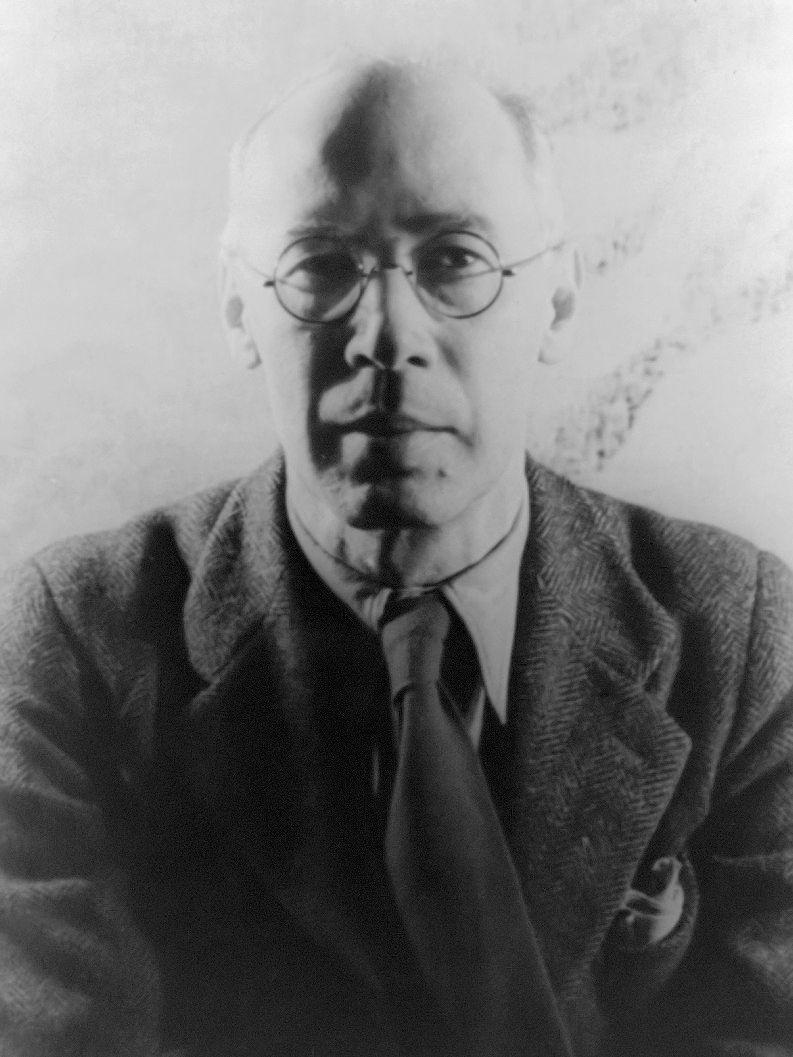
- Miller in 1940
- Born: Henry Valentine Miller; December 26, 1891; New York City, U.S.
- Died: June 7, 1980 (aged 88); Los Angeles, California U.S.
- Occupation: Writer
- Spouses: Beatrice Sylvas Wickens (m. 1917; div. 1924); June Miller (m. 1924; div. 1934); Janina Martha Lepska (m. 1944; div. 1952); Eve McClure (m. 1953; div. 1960); Hiroko Tokuda (m. 1967; div. 1977)
- Children: 3
- Writing career
- Period: 1934–80
- Genres: Roman à clef, philosophical fiction
- Notable works: Tropic of Cancer; Black Spring; Tropic of Capricorn; The Colossus of Maroussi; The Rosy Crucifixion

Henry Valentine Miller (December 26, 1891 – June 7, 1980) was an American novelist, short story writer and essayist. He broke with existing literary forms and developed a new type of semi-autobiographical novel that blends character study, social criticism, philosophical reflection, stream of consciousness, explicit language, sex, surrealist free association, and mysticism. His most characteristic works of this kind are Tropic of Cancer, Black Spring, Tropic of Capricorn, and the trilogy The Rosy Crucifixion, which are based on his experiences in New York City and Paris, and all of which were banned in the United States until 1961. He also wrote travel memoirs and literary criticism and painted watercolors.

== Early life ==
Miller was born at his family's home, 450 East 85th Street, in the Yorkville section of Manhattan, New York City. He was the son of Lutheran German parents, Louise Marie (Neiting) and tailor Heinrich Miller. As a child, he lived for nine years at 662 Driggs Avenue in Williamsburg, Brooklyn, known at that time (and referred to frequently in his works) as the Fourteenth Ward. In 1900, his family moved to 1063 Decatur Street in Brooklyn's Bushwick neighborhood. Although his family remained in Bushwick, Miller attended Eastern District High School in Williamsburg after finishing elementary school. As a young man, he was active with the Socialist Party of America (his "quondam idol" was the black Socialist Hubert Harrison). He attended the City College of New York for one semester.

== Career ==
=== Brooklyn, 1917–1930 ===
Miller married his first wife, Beatrice Sylvas Wickens, in 1917; their divorce was granted on December 21, 1923. Together they had a daughter, Barbara, born in 1919. They lived in an apartment at 244 6th Avenue in Park Slope, Brooklyn. At the time, Miller was working at Western Union; he worked there from 1920 to 1924 as personnel manager in the messenger department. In March 1922, during a three-week vacation, he wrote his first novel, Clipped Wings. It has never been published, and only fragments remain, although parts of it were recycled in other works, such as Tropic of Capricorn. A study of twelve Western Union messengers, Clipped Wings was characterized by Miller as "a long book and probably a very bad one."

In 1923, while still married to Beatrice, Miller met and became enamored of a mysterious dance-hall ingénue who was born Juliet Edith Smerth but went by the stage-name June Mansfield. She was 21 at the time. They began an affair, and married on June 1, 1924. In 1924 Miller quit Western Union to dedicate himself completely to writing. He described this time—his struggles to become a writer, his sexual escapades, his failures, his friends, his philosophy—in his autobiographical trilogy The Rosy Crucifixion.

Miller's second novel, Moloch: or, This Gentile World, was written in 1927–28, initially under the guise of a novel by his wife Juliet (June). A rich older admirer of June, Roland Freedman, paid her to write the novel; she would show him pages of Miller's work each week, pretending it was hers. The book was unpublished until 1992, 65 years after it was written and 12 years after Miller's death. Moloch is based on Miller's first marriage and his years working at the Western Union office in Lower Manhattan. A third novel written around this time, Crazy Cock, was also unpublished until after Miller's death. Initially titled Lovely Lesbians, Crazy Cock (along with his later novel Nexus) told the story of June's close relationship with the artist Marion, whom June renamed Jean Kronski. Kronski lived with Miller and June from 1926 until 1927, when June and Kronski went to Paris together, leaving Miller behind, which upset him greatly. Miller suspected the two of having a sexual relationship. While in Paris, June and Kronski did not get along, and June returned to Miller several months later. Kronski died by suicide around 1930.

=== Paris, 1930–1939 ===
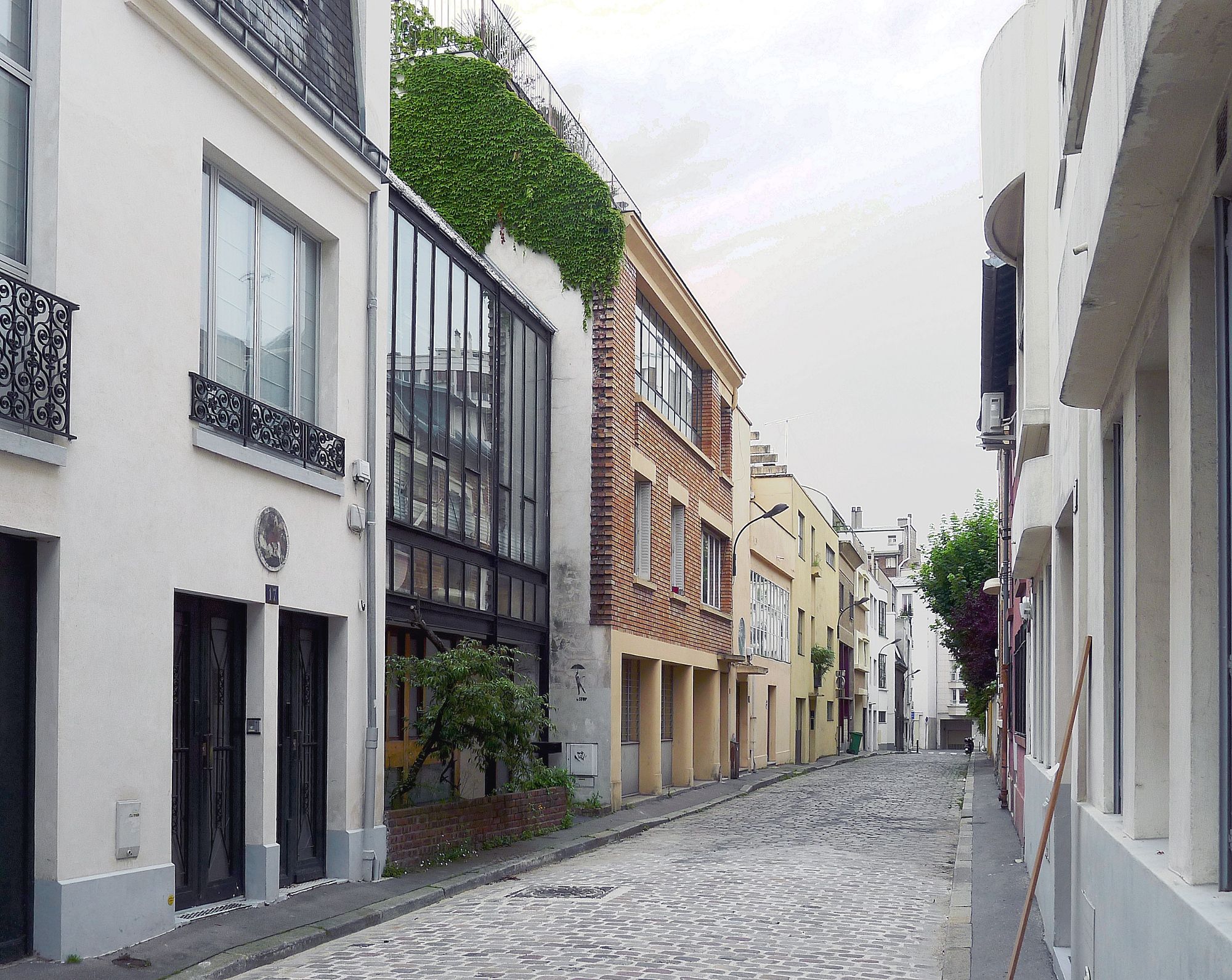
Villa Seurat in Paris, where Henry Miller lived

In 1928, Miller spent several months in Paris with June, a trip financed by Freedman. One day on a Paris street, Miller met another author, Robert W. Service, who recalled the story in his autobiography: "Soon we got into conversation which turned to books. For a stripling he spoke with some authority, turning into ridicule the pretentious scribes of the Latin Quarter and their freak magazine." In 1930, Miller moved to Paris unaccompanied. Soon thereafter, he began work on Tropic of Cancer, writing to a friend, "I start tomorrow on the Paris book: First person, uncensored, formless—fuck everything!" Miller had little or no money the first year in Paris, but things began to change after he met Anaïs Nin, who, with Hugh Guiler, paid his entire way through the 1930s, including the rent for an apartment at 18 Villa Seurat. Nin became his lover and financed the first printing of Tropic of Cancer in 1934 with money from Otto Rank. She wrote extensively in her journals about her relationship with Miller and June; the first volume, covering the years 1931–34, was published in 1966. Late in 1934, June divorced Miller by proxy in Mexico City.

In 1931, Miller was employed by the Chicago Tribune Paris edition as a proofreader, thanks to his friend Alfred Perlès, who worked there. Miller took this opportunity to submit some of his own articles under Perlès's name, since at that time only the editorial staff were permitted to publish in the paper. This period in Paris was highly creative for Miller, and during this time he also established a significant and influential network of authors circulating around the Villa Seurat. At that time a young British author, Lawrence Durrell, became a lifelong friend. Miller's correspondence with Durrell was later published in two books. Miller also met Betty Ryan, his neighbor at 18 Villa Seurat, with whom he maintained a lifelong friendship. She inspired his trip to Greece, as cited in the first lines of The Colossus of Marussi: "I would never have gone to Greece had it not been for a girl named Betty Ryan who lived in the same house with me in Paris." During his Paris period he was also influenced by the French Surrealists.

His works contain detailed accounts of sexual experiences. His first published book, Tropic of Cancer (1934), was published by Obelisk Press in Paris and banned in the United States on the grounds of obscenity. The dust jacket came wrapped with a warning: "Not to be imported into the United States or Great Britain." He continued to write novels that were banned; along with Tropic of Cancer, his Black Spring (1936) and Tropic of Capricorn (1939) were smuggled into his native country, building Miller an underground reputation. While the aforementioned novels remained banned in the US for over two decades, in 1939, New Directions published The Cosmological Eye, Miller's first book to be published in the US. The collection contained short prose pieces, most of which originally appeared in 1938 in Black Spring and Max and the White Phagocytes.

Miller became fluent in French during his ten-year stay in Paris and lived in France until June 1939. During the late 1930s he also learned about German-born sailor George Dibbern, helped to promote his memoir, Quest, and organized charity to help him.

=== Greece, 1939–1940 ===
In 1939, Durrell, who was living in Corfu, Greece, invited Miller to Greece. Miller described the visit in The Colossus of Maroussi (1941), which he considered his best book. One of the first acknowledgments of Miller as a major modern writer was by George Orwell in his 1940 essay "Inside the Whale". Orwell wrote:

Here in my opinion is the only imaginative prose-writer of the slightest value who has appeared among the English-speaking races for some years past. Even if that is objected to as an overstatement, it will probably be admitted that Miller is a writer out of the ordinary, worth more than a single glance; and after all, he is a completely negative, unconstructive, amoral writer, a mere Jonah, a passive acceptor of evil, a sort of Whitman among the corpses.

"Opus Pistorum" is an erotic novel attributed to Henry Miller. The work originated in 1941, when Miller, Anaïs Nin, and others in their literary circle produced erotic stories for a private collector who paid them one dollar per page. The extent of Miller's individual authorship of the material has been disputed. The novel was published posthumously by Grove Press in 1983.

=== California, 1942–1980 ===
A 1957 watercolor by Miller

In 1940, Miller returned to New York. After a year-long trip around the United States, a journey that became material for The Air-Conditioned Nightmare, he moved to California in June 1942, initially residing just outside Hollywood in Beverly Glen before settling in Big Sur in 1944. While Miller was establishing his base in Big Sur, the Tropic books, still banned in the US, were being published in France by Obelisk Press and later Olympia Press. There they were slowly and steadily gaining notoriety among both Europeans and various enclaves of American cultural exiles. As a result, they were frequently smuggled into the US, where they were a major influence on the new Beat Generation of American writers, most notably Jack Kerouac, the only Beat writer Miller liked. By the time his banned books were published in the 1960s and he was becoming better known, Miller was no longer interested in his image as an outlaw writer of smut-filled books, but he eventually gave up fighting the image.

In 1942, shortly before moving to California, Miller began writing Sexus, the first novel in The Rosy Crucifixion trilogy, a fictionalized account of the six-year period of his life in Brooklyn falling in love with June and struggling to become a writer. Like several of his other works, the trilogy, completed in 1959, was initially banned in the US, published only in France and Japan. Miller lived in a small house on Partington Ridge from 1944 to 1947, along with other bohemian writers like Harry Partch, Emil White, and Jean Varda. There he wrote "Into the Nightlife", about the artists who lived at Anderson Creek as the Anderson Creek Gang in Big Sur and the Oranges of Hieronymus Bosch. Miller paid $5 per month rent for his shack on the property.

In other works written during his time in California, Miller was widely critical of consumerism in America, as reflected in Sunday After the War (1944) and The Air-Conditioned Nightmare (1945). Big Sur and the Oranges of Hieronymus Bosch, published in 1957, is a collection of stories about his life and friends in Big Sur.

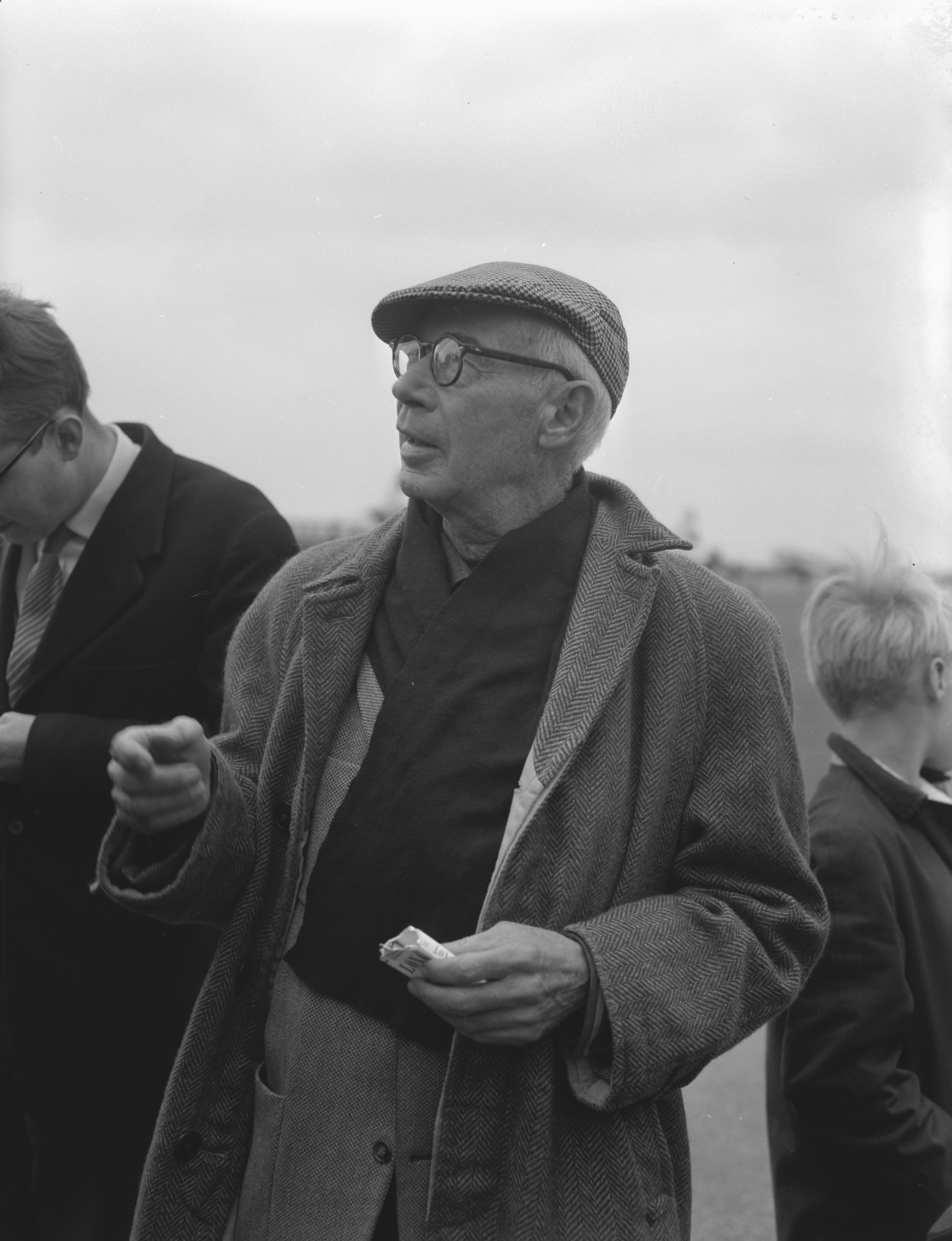
Miller (1959)

In 1944, Miller met and married his third wife, Janina Martha Lepska, a philosophy student who was 30 years his junior. They had two children: a son, Tony, and a daughter, Valentine. They divorced in 1952. The next year, he married artist Eve McClure, who was 37 years his junior. They divorced in 1960, and she died in 1966, likely as a result of alcoholism. In 1961, Miller arranged a reunion in New York with his ex-wife June, the main subject of The Rosy Crucifixion trilogy. They had not seen each other in nearly three decades. In a letter to Eve, he described his shock at June's "terrible" appearance, as she had degenerated both physically and mentally.

In 1948, Miller wrote a novella he called his "most singular story", The Smile at the Foot of the Ladder.

In February 1963, Miller moved to 444 Ocampo Drive, Pacific Palisades, Los Angeles, California, where he spent the last 17 years of his life, often in the company of his boon companion and close friend Joe Gray who Miller maintained was one of his three best friends in America in the 1960s. In 1967, Miller married his fifth wife, Japanese-born singer and actress Hoki Tokuda (ja:ホキ徳田). In 1968, Miller signed the "Writers and Editors War Tax Protest" pledge, vowing to refuse tax payments in protest against the Vietnam War. After moving to Ocampo Drive, he held dinner parties for the artistic and literary figures of the time. His cook and caretaker was a young artist's model, Twinka Thiebaud, who later wrote a book about his evening chats. Thiebaud's memories of Miller's table talk were published in a rewritten and retitled book in 2011.

Only 200 copies of Miller's 1972 chapbook On Turning Eighty were published. Published by Capra Press in collaboration with Yes! Press, it was the first volume of the "Yes! Capra" chapbook series and is 34 pages long. The book contains three essays on topics such as aging and living a meaningful life. Of reaching age 80 years, Miller writes:

If at eighty you're not a cripple or an invalid, if you have your health, if you still enjoy a good walk, a good meal (with all the trimmings), if you can sleep without first taking a pill, if birds and flowers, mountains and sea still inspire you, you are a most fortunate individual and you should get down on your knees morning and night and thank the good Lord for his savin' and keepin' power.

In 1973, Miller was nominated for the Nobel Prize in Literature by University of Copenhagen professor Allan Philip.

Miller and Tokuda divorced in 1977. Then in his late 80s, Miller filmed with Warren Beatty for the 1981 film Reds, which Beatty also directed. He spoke of his remembrances of John Reed and Louise Bryant as part of a series of "witnesses". The film was released 18 months after Miller's death. During the last four years of his life, Miller held an ongoing correspondence of over 1,500 letters with Brenda Venus, a young Playboy model and columnist, actress, and dancer. A book about their correspondence was published by William Morrow, New York, in 1986.

== Death ==
Miller died of circulatory complications at his home in Pacific Palisades, Los Angeles, on June 7, 1980, aged 88. His body was cremated and his ashes shared between his son Tony and daughter Val. Tony has said he intends to have his own ashes mixed with his father's and scattered in Big Sur.

== US publication of previously banned works ==
The publication of Miller's Tropic of Cancer in the United States in 1961 by Grove Press led to a series of obscenity trials that tested American laws on pornography. The U.S. Supreme Court, in Grove Press, Inc., v. Gerstein, citing Jacobellis v. Ohio (which was decided the same day in 1964), overruled the state court findings of obscenity and declared the book a work of literature. This was one of the signature events of the sexual revolution. Elmer Gertz, the lawyer who successfully argued the initial case for the novel's publication in Illinois, became Miller's lifelong friend; a volume of their correspondence has been published. After the trial, in 1964–65, Miller's other books, which had also been banned in the US, were published by Grove Press: Black Spring, Tropic of Capricorn, Quiet Days in Clichy, Sexus, Plexus, and Nexus. Excerpts from some of them, including Tropic of Cancer, Black Spring, and Sexus, were first published in the US by New Directions in The Henry Miller Reader in 1959.

== Watercolors ==
In addition to his literary accomplishments, Miller produced numerous watercolor paintings and wrote books on this field. He was a close friend of the French painter Grégoire Michonze. It is estimated that Miller painted 2,000 watercolors during his life, and that 50 or more major collections of his paintings exist. The Harry Ransom Center at the University of Texas at Austin holds a selection of his watercolors, as did the Henry Miller Museum of Art in Ōmachi City in Nagano, Japan, before closing in 2001. Miller's daughter Valentine placed some of her father's art for sale in 2005. He was also an amateur pianist.

== Literary archives ==
Miller's papers can be found in the following library special collections:

- Southern Illinois University Carbondale, which has correspondence and other archival collections.
- Syracuse University, which holds a portion of the correspondence between the Grove Press and Henry Miller.
- Charles E. Young Research Library of the University of California, Los Angeles Library.
- Harry Ransom Center at the University of Texas at Austin, which has materials about Miller from his first wife and their daughter.
- University of Victoria, which holds a significant collection of Miller's manuscripts and correspondence, including the corrected typescripts for Max and Quiet Days in Clichy, as well as Miller's lengthy correspondence with Alfred Perlès.
- University of Virginia.
- Beinecke Rare Book and Manuscript Library, Yale University Library.
- University of Pennsylvania Libraries, Philadelphia, PA.

Miller's friend Emil White founded the nonprofit Henry Miller Memorial Library in Big Sur in 1981. It houses a collection of his work and celebrates his literary, artistic, and cultural legacy by providing a public gallery as well as performance and workshop spaces for artists, musicians, students, and writers.

== Literary references ==
Miller is considered a "literary innovator" in whose works "actual and imagined experiences became indistinguishable from each other." His books did much to free the discussion of sexual subjects in American writing from both legal and social restrictions. He influenced many writers, including Lojze Kovačič, Richard Brautigan, Jack Kerouac, Norman Mailer, Vitomil Zupan, Philip Roth, Cormac McCarthy, Paul Theroux, and Erica Jong.

Throughout his novels he makes references to other works of literature; he cites Fyodor Dostoyevsky, Joris-Karl Huysmans, Knut Hamsun, Oswald Spengler, Balzac, and Nietzsche as having a formative impact on him.

Tropic of Cancer is referenced in Junot Díaz's 2007 book The Brief Wondrous Life of Oscar Wao. Miller's legal difficulties, Tropic of Cancer, and Tropic of Capricorn are mentioned in Denis Johnson's 2007 novel Tree of Smoke. Miller's relationship with June Mansfield is the subject of Ida Therén's 2020 novel Att omfamna ett vattenfall.

== Films ==
=== Miller as himself ===
Miller appeared as himself in several films:

- He was the subject of four documentary films by Robert Snyder, The Henry Miller Odyssey (1969; 90 minutes); Henry Miller: Reflections On Writing (47 minutes); Henry Miller Reads and Muses (60 minutes); and Henry Miller: To Paint Is To Love Again (60 minutes), which was completed after Snyder's death. All four films are in Miller's own words.
- He was a "witness" (interviewee) in Warren Beatty's 1981 film Reds.
- He was featured in the 1996 documentary Henry Miller Is Not Dead, with music by Laurie Anderson.
- Henry Miller: Prophet der Lüste (Henry Miller: Prophet of Desire), is a 2017 biographical documentary TV movie by the German director Gero von Boehm that also features Erica Jong, Brassaï, and Anaïs Nin.

=== Actors portraying Miller ===
Several actors played Miller on film:

- Rip Torn in the 1970 film adaptation of Tropic of Cancer.
- In the 1970 film adaptation of Quiet Days in Clichy, the Miller-based character of 'Joey' was played by Paul Valjean.
- Fred Ward in the 1990 film Henry & June, based on the diaries of Anaïs Nin.
- David Brandon in the 1990 film The Room of Words (La stanza delle parole), also based on Nin's diaries.
- Claude Chabrol's 1990 film adaptation of Quiet Days in Clichy saw Andrew McCarthy play Miller.
- In Mara (2015), a short film by Mike Figgis, a dramatization of Mara-Marignan from Quiet Days in Clichy, he is portrayed by Scott Glenn and Mara by Juliette Binoche. The 20-minute film was originally shot and broadcast as part of HBO's anthology film Women & Men 2 (1991).
- In 2018 Trevor White in the TV series The Durrells in Corfu season 3, episodes 3 and 7, as recurring role.
