= Tropic of Cancer (novel) =

1934 novel by Henry Miller

- First edition cover
- Author: Henry Miller
- Cover artist: Maurice Girodias
- Language: English
- Genre: Autobiographical novel
- Publisher: Obelisk Press
- Publication date: 1934
- Publication place: France
- Media type: Print (Hardcover)
- Pages: 318
- Followed by: Black Spring

Tropic of Cancer is an autobiographical novel by Henry Miller that is best known as "notorious for its candid sexuality", with the resulting social controversy considered responsible for the "free speech that we now take for granted in literature". It was first published in 1934 by the Obelisk Press in Paris, France; however, this edition was banned in the United States. Its publication in 1961 in the United States by Grove Press led to obscenity trials that tested American laws on pornography in the early 1960s. In 1964, the U.S. Supreme Court declared the book non-obscene. It is regarded as an important work of 20th-century literature.

== Writing and publication ==
I am living at the Villa Borghese. There is not a crumb of dirt anywhere, nor a chair misplaced. We are all alone here and we are dead.

— First passage excerpt

Miller wrote the book between 1930 and 1934 during his "nomadic life" in Paris. The fictional Villa Borghese was actually 18 Villa Seurat in Paris' 14th arrondissement. As Miller discloses in the text of the book, he first intended to title it "Crazy Cock". Miller gave the following explanation of why the book's title was Tropic of Cancer: "It was because to me cancer symbolizes the disease of civilization, the endpoint of the wrong path, the necessity to change course radically, to start completely over from scratch."

Anaïs Nin helped edit the book. In 1934, Jack Kahane's Obelisk Press published the book with financial backing from Nin, who had borrowed the money from Otto Rank.

== Emerson quotation, preface, and introduction ==
In the 1961 edition, opposite the novel's title page is a quotation from Ralph Waldo Emerson:

These novels will give way, by and by, to diaries or autobiographies—captivating books, if only a man knew how to choose among what he calls his experiences that which is really his experience, and how to record truth truly.

The 1961 edition includes an introduction by Karl Shapiro written in 1960 and titled "The Greatest Living Author". The first three sentences are:

I call Henry Miller the greatest living author because I think he is. I do not call him a poet because he has never written a poem; he even dislikes poetry, I think. But everything he has written is a poem in the best as well as in the broadest sense of the word.

Following the introduction is a preface written by Nin in 1934, which begins as follows:

Here is a book which, if such a thing were possible, might restore our appetite for the fundamental realities. The predominant note will seem one of bitterness, and bitterness there is, to the full. But there is also a wild extravagance, a mad gaiety, a verve, a gusto, at times almost a delirium.

== Summary ==
Set in France (primarily Paris) during the late 1920s and early 1930s, Tropic of Cancer centers on Miller's life as a struggling writer. Late in the novel, Miller explains his artistic approach to writing the book itself, stating:

Up to the present, my idea of collaborating with myself has been to get off the gold standard of literature. My idea briefly has been to present a resurrection of the emotions, to depict the conduct of a human being in the stratosphere of ideas, that is, in the grip of delirium.

Combining autobiography and fiction, some chapters follow a narrative of some kind and refer to Miller's actual friends, colleagues, and workplaces; others are written as stream-of-consciousness reflections that are occasionally epiphanic. The novel is written in the first person, as are many of Miller's other novels, and does not have a linear organization, but rather fluctuates frequently between the past and present.

== Themes ==
The book largely functions as an immersive meditation on the human condition. As a struggling writer, Miller describes his experience living in a community of bohemians in Paris, where he intermittently suffers from hunger, homelessness, squalor, loneliness, and despair over his recent separation from his wife. Describing his perception of Paris during this time, Miller wrote:

One can live in Paris—I discovered that!—on just grief and anguish. A bitter nourishment—perhaps the best there is for certain people. At any rate, I had not yet come to the end of my rope. I was only flirting with disaster. ... I understood then why it is that Paris attracts the tortured, the hallucinated, the great maniacs of love. I understood why it is that here, at the very hub of the wheel, one can embrace the most fantastic, the most impossible theories, without finding them in the least strange; it is here that one reads again the books of his youth and the enigmas take on new meanings, one for every white hair. One walks the streets knowing that he is mad, possessed, because it is only too obvious that these cold, indifferent faces are the visages of one's keepers. Here all boundaries fade away and the world reveals itself for the mad slaughterhouse that it is. The treadmill stretches away to infinitude, the hatches are closed down tight, logic runs rampant, with bloody cleaver flashing.

There are many passages explicitly describing the narrator's sexual encounters. In 1978, literary scholar Donald Gutierrez argued that the sexual comedy in the book was "undeniably low... [but with] a stronger visceral appeal than high comedy". The characters are caricatures, and the male characters "stumbl[e] through the mazes of their conceptions of woman".

Music and dance are other recurrent themes in the book. Music is used "as a sign of the flagging vitality Miller everywhere rejects". References to dancing include a comparison of loving Mona to a "dance of death", and a call for the reader to join in "a last expiring dance" even though "we are doomed".

== Characters ==
Other than the first-person narrator "Henry Miller", the major characters include:

Boris
A friend who rents rooms at the Villa Borghese. The character was modeled after Michael Fraenkel, a writer who "had sheltered Miller during his hobo days" in 1930.
Carl
A writer friend who complains about optimistic people, about Paris, and about writing. Miller helps Carl write love letters to "the rich cunt, Irene", and Carl relates his encounter with her to Miller. Carl lives in squalor and rapes a minor. The inspiration for Carl was Miller's friend Alfred Perlès, a writer.
Collins
A sailor who befriends Fillmore and Miller. As Collins had fallen in love with a boy in the past, his undressing a sick Miller to put him to bed has been interpreted as evidence of a homoerotic desire for Miller.
Fillmore
A "young man in the diplomatic service" who becomes friends with Miller. He invites Miller to stay with him; later the Russian "princess" Macha with "the clap" joins them. Fillmore and Miller disrupt a mass while hung over. Toward the end of the book, Fillmore promises to marry a French woman named Ginette who is pregnant by him, but she is physically abusive and controlling, and Miller convinces Fillmore to leave Paris without her. Fillmore's real-life counterpart was Richard Galen Osborn, a lawyer.
Mona
A character corresponding to Miller's estranged second wife June Miller. Miller remembers Mona, who is now in America, nostalgically.
Tania
A woman married to Sylvester. The character was modeled after Bertha Schrank, who was married to Joseph Schrank. It may also be noted that during the writing of the novel, Miller also had a passionate affair with Anaïs Nin; by changing the "T" to an "S", one can make out Anais from Tania by rearranging the letters. It may also be noted that in one of Nin's many passionate letters to Miller, she quotes his swoon found below. Tania has an affair with Miller, who fantasizes about her:

O Tania, where now is that warm cunt of yours, those fat, heavy garters, those soft, bulging thighs? There is a bone in my prick six inches long. I will ream out every wrinkle in your cunt, Tania, big with seed. I will send you home to your Sylvester with an ache in your belly and your womb turned inside out. Your Sylvester! Yes, he knows how to build a fire, but I know how to inflame a cunt. I shoot hot bolts into you, Tania, I make your ovaries incandescent.

Van Norden
A friend of Miller's who is "probably the most sexually corrupt man" in the book, having a "total lack of empathy with women". Van Norden refers to women using terms such as "my Georgia cunt", "fucking cunt", "rich cunt", "married cunts", "Danish cunt", and "foolish cunts". Miller helps Van Norden move to a room in a hotel, where Van Norden brings women "day in and out". The character was based on Wambly Bald, a gossip columnist.

== Legal issues ==
=== United States ===
Upon the book's publication in France in 1934, the United States Customs Service banned the book from being imported into the U.S. Frances Steloff sold copies of the novel smuggled from Paris during the 1930s at her Gotham Book Mart, which led to lawsuits. A copyright-infringing edition of the novel was published in New York City in 1940 by "Medusa" (Jacob Brussel); its last page claimed its place of publication to be Mexico. Brussel was eventually sent to jail for three years for the edition.

In 1950, Ernest Besig, the director of the American Civil Liberties Union in San Francisco, attempted to import Tropic of Cancer along with Miller's other novel, Tropic of Capricorn, to the United States. Customs detained the novels and Besig sued the government. Before the case went to trial, Besig requested a motion to admit 19 depositions from literary critics testifying to the "literary value of the novels and to Miller's stature as a serious writer." The motion was denied by Judge Louis A. Goodman. The case went to trial with Goodman presiding. Goodman declared both novels obscene. Besig appealed the decision to the Ninth Circuit of Appeals, but the novels were once again declared "obscene" in a unanimous decision in Besig v. United States.

In 1961, when Grove Press legally published the book in the United States, over 60 obscenity lawsuits in over 21 states were brought against booksellers that sold it. The opinions of courts varied; for example, in his dissent from the majority holding that the book was not obscene, Pennsylvania Supreme Court Justice Michael Musmanno wrote Cancer is "not a book. It is a cesspool, an open sewer, a pit of putrefaction, a slimy gathering of all that is rotten in the debris of human depravity."

Publisher Barney Rosset hired lawyer Charles Rembar to help Rosset lead the "effort to assist every bookseller prosecuted, regardless of whether there was a legal obligation to do so." Rembar successfully argued two appeals cases, in Massachusetts and New Jersey, although the book continued to be judged obscene in New York and other states.

In 1964, the U.S. Supreme Court, in Grove Press, Inc. v. Gerstein, cited Jacobellis v. Ohio (which was decided the same day) and overruled state court findings that Tropic of Cancer was obscene. A separate 1964 legal case in the state of Wisconsin saw the book held to be non-obscene by a majority of justices on the Wisconsin Supreme Court.

=== Other countries ===
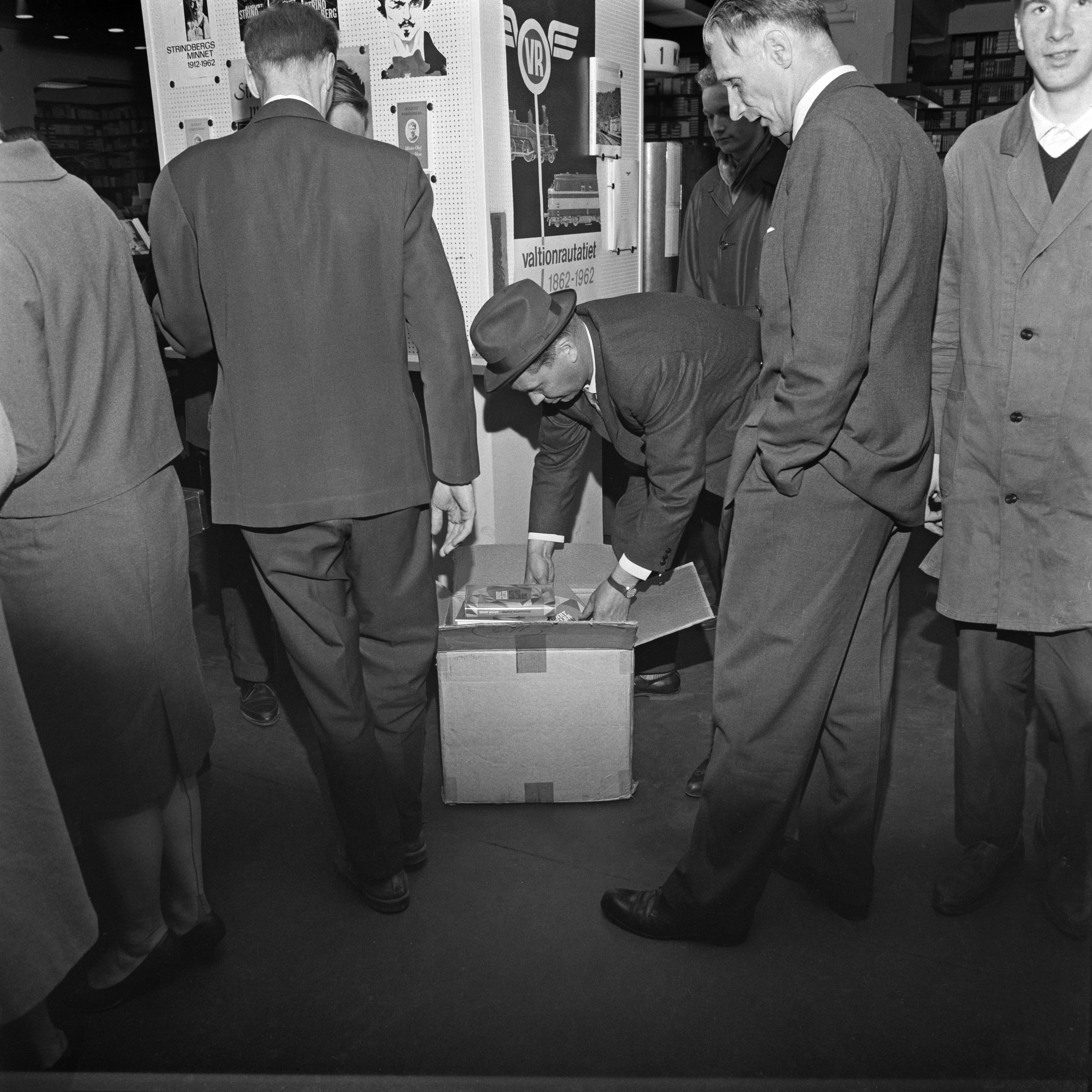
Copies of the Finnish translation (Kravun kääntöpiiri) are being confiscated in Helsinki, Finland, in May 1962. The Swedish translation and the English-language original could still be sold legally in this country.

The book was banned outside the U.S. as well:

- In Canada, it was on the list of books banned by customs as of 1938. The Royal Canadian Mounted Police seized copies of the book from bookstores and public libraries in the early 1960s. By 1964, attitudes toward the book had "liberalized".
- Only smuggled copies of the book were available in the United Kingdom after its publication in 1934. Scotland Yard contemplated banning its publication in Britain in the 1960s, but decided against the ban because literary figures such as T. S. Eliot were ready to defend the book publicly.
- In Australia the book was banned until the early 1970s when the Minister for Customs and Excise, Don Chipp, largely ended censorship of printed material in the country.
- In Finland all printed copies of the Finnish versions of the book were confiscated by the state before the books were to be published in 1962. The book was not published there in Finnish until 1970, however the book was available in Swedish and English.

== Critical reception ==
=== Individual reviewers ===
In 1935, H. L. Mencken read the 1934 Paris edition, and sent an encouraging note to Miller: "I read Tropic of Cancer a month ago. It seems to me to be a really excellent piece of work, and I so reported to the person who sent it to me. Of this, more when we meet."

George Orwell reviewed Tropic of Cancer in the New English Weekly in 1935. Orwell focused on Miller's descriptions of sexual encounters, which he deemed significant for their "attempt to get at real facts," and which he saw as a departure from dominant trends. Orwell argued that, although Miller concerns himself with uglier aspects of life, he is nonetheless not quite a pessimist, and seems to find that the contemplation of ugliness makes life more worthwhile rather than less. Concluding, he described Tropic of Cancer as "a remarkable book" and recommended it to "anyone who can get hold of a copy". Returning to the novel in the essay "Inside the Whale" (1940), George Orwell wrote the following:

I earnestly counsel anyone who has not done so to read at least Tropic of Cancer. With a little ingenuity, or by paying a little over the published price, you can get hold of it, and even if parts of it disgust you, it will stick in your memory. ... Here in my opinion is the only imaginative prose-writer of the slightest value who has appeared among the English-speaking races for some years past. Even if that is objected to as an overstatement, it will probably be admitted that Miller is a writer out of the ordinary, worth more than a single glance....

Samuel Beckett hailed it as "a momentous event in the history of modern writing". Norman Mailer, in his 1976 book on Miller entitled Genius and Lust, called it "one of the ten or twenty great novels of our century, a revolution in consciousness equal to The Sun Also Rises".

Edmund Wilson said of the novel:

The tone of the book is undoubtedly low; The Tropic of Cancer, in fact, from the point of view both of its happenings and of the language in which they are conveyed, is the lowest book of any real literary merit that I ever remember to have read... there is a strange amenity of temper and style which bathes the whole composition even when it is disgusting or tiresome.

In 1980, Anatole Broyard described Tropic of Cancer as "Mr. Miller's first and best novel", showing "a flair for finding symbolism in unobtrusive places" and having "beautiful sentence[s]". Julian Symons wrote in 1993 that "the shock effect [of the novel] has gone", although "it remains an extraordinary document". A 2009 essay on the book by Ewan Morrison described it as a "life-saver" when he was "wandering from drink to drink and bed to bed, dangerously close to total collapse."

=== Appearances in lists of best books ===
The book has been included in a number of lists of best books, such as the following:

- In July 1998, the Board of the Modern Library ranked Tropic of Cancer 50th on its list of the 100 best English-language novels of the 20th century.
- In July 1998, students of the Radcliffe Publishing Course, at the request of the Modern Library editorial board, compiled their own list of the 100 best English-language novels of the 20th century, and the book was ranked 84th.
- Between July 1998 and October 1998, an online reader poll by the Modern Library placed the novel 68th among the 100 best English-language novels of the 20th century.
- In a survey of librarians published in November 1998, the book was ranked 132nd in a list of 150 fiction books from the 20th century.
- Time magazine included the novel in its list of the 100 best English-language novels from 1923 to 2005.
- The novel was listed in the 2006 book 1001 Books You Must Read Before You Die.
- It was one of the "1000 Novels Everyone Must Read" in The Guardian in 2009.
- It was included in the list "The 75 Books Every Man Should Read" (2011) in Esquire.

== Influences ==
=== Influences on the author ===
Critics, and Miller himself, have claimed that Miller was influenced by the following in writing the novel:

- Louis-Ferdinand Céline, especially Journey to the End of the Night (1932), his semi-autobiographical first novel featuring a "comic, antiheroic character". Nevertheless, George Orwell wrote "Both books use unprintable words, both are in some sense autobiographical, but that is all."
- Fyodor Dostoyevsky, especially his Notes from Underground (1864).
- James Joyce. Nevertheless, Orwell felt that the novel did not resemble Joyce's Ulysses.
- François Rabelais.
- Henry David Thoreau.
- Walt Whitman, who wrote in a similar style about common people. The poet is mentioned favorably in the novel several times, for example: "In Whitman the whole American scene comes to life, her past and her future, her birth and her death. Whatever there is of value in America Whitman has expressed, and there is nothing more to be said."

=== Novel's influence on other writers ===
Tropic of Cancer "has had a huge and indelible impact on both the American literary tradition and American society as a whole." The novel influenced many writers, as exemplified by the following:

- Lawrence Durrell's 1938 novel The Black Book was described as "celebrat[ing] the Henry Miller of Tropic of Cancer as his [Durrell's] literary father."
- It has been claimed that the novel impressed the Beat Generation writers in the 1960s such as Jack Kerouac and William S. Burroughs.
- Erica Jong wrote "...when I was searching for the freedom to write [the 1973 novel] Fear of Flying, I picked up Tropic of Cancer and the sheer exuberance of the prose unlocked something in me." In turn, Miller praised Fear of Flying in 1974, comparing it to Tropic of Cancer.

== Adaptation ==
The novel was adapted for a 1970 film Tropic of Cancer directed by Joseph Strick, and starring Rip Torn, James T. Callahan, and Ellen Burstyn. Miller was a "technical consultant" during the production of the movie; although he had reservations about the adaptation of the book, he praised the final movie. The film was rated X in the United States, which was later changed to an NC-17 rating.

== References or allusions in other works ==
Literature

- In his 1948 autobiography, poet and writer Robert W. Service wrote a few comments about Tropic of Cancer, for example, "Of course the book shocked me but I could not deny a strange flicker of genius in its wildest fights."
- In chapter 2 of William Gaddis's 1955 novel The Recognitions, set in Paris in the 1930s, an artist complains "I've got to show these pictures, I've got to sell some of them, but how can I have people coming up there with him there? He's dying. I can't put him out on the street, dying like that . . . even in Paris." (63–64) which echoes the scene in Tropic of Cancer where the artist Kruger tries to get the sick Miller out of his studio so that he can exhibit his pictures. "People can't look at pictures and statues with enthusiasm when a man is dying before their eyes." (Grove ed., 195)
- In his 1960 short story "Entropy," Thomas Pynchon begins with a quote from this novel.
- In the 1965 novel God Bless You, Mr. Rosewater by Kurt Vonnegut, Lila reads the book "as though... [it] were Heidi."
- In the 1969 novel The Seven Minutes by Irving Wallace, the book and the trial are mentioned.
- In the 1994 play Pterodactyls by Nicky Silver, the novel is mentioned by the character Emma: "She reads poems by Emily Bronté and I read chapters from The Tropic of Cancer by Henry Miller."
- In Carl Hiaasen's 1995 Stormy Weather a character quotes a line from the novel.
- In the 1998 nonfiction book Rocket Boys, Quentin shows Sonny a copy of Tropic of Cancer and asks him, "You want to know about girls?"

Music

- Satirical songwriter and mathematics instructor Tom Lehrer stated that he intended to write a million-selling math book which he would call Tropic of Calculus.
- The 1980s British band The Weather Prophets was named after a line in the opening paragraph of the novel: "Boris has just given me a summary of his views. He is a weather prophet."
- Frontman Henry Rollins of the hardcore punk band Black Flag was heavily affected by the book as well and frequently made references to it in his songs, often taking lyrics directly from Tropic of Cancer. He would also read passages of it to his audiences mid-show.
- In the song "Delirium of Disorder" by punk band Bad Religion, the opening verse quotes the novel, "Life is a sieve through which my anarchy strains resolving itself into words. Chaos is the score on which reality is written...."
- In the song "Protest Song 68" by Refused, the opening verse quotes the novel, "To sing you must first open your mouth. You must have a pair of lungs...."
- In the song "Ashes of American Flags" by Wilco, one phrase from the lyrics is taken from the novel: "A hole without a key."
- In 2012, the American grindcore band Pig Destroyer used a passage from the book on tape, read by Larry King, as the introduction to their song The Bug on their album entitled Book Burner.

Film and television

- In a 1962 episode of the TV series Perry Mason ("The Case of the Bogus Books"), a character tells another that "Tropic of Cancer is not a medical book. Far from it."
- In the 1963 film, Take Her, She's Mine, adapted from Phoebe and Henry Ephron's play of the same name, Jimmy Stewart, as Mr. Michaelson, reads the soon-to-be-banned-by-the-mayor book written by Henry Miller. Sandra Dee, Stewart's daughter in the film, has organized a sit-in style protest against banning the book.
- In the M*A*S*H season 4 episode "Deluge", first aired in 1976, Radar O'Reilly (played by Gary Burghoff) attempts to trade "Tropic of Cancer, or the Tropic of Copper Can" (a mispronunciation of Tropic of Capricorn) for plasma, adding, "They'll get you through the war without a leave."
- In the 1985 film After Hours, the protagonist Paul is reading the book in a coffee shop when Marcy comments on it from the table across, setting the events of the film in motion.
- In the 1990 movie Henry & June, the first draft of the book is referenced and discussed by Henry and friends.
- In the 1991 version of Cape Fear, the characters of Max Cady and Danielle Bowden discuss the book briefly.
- In the 1991 Seinfeld episode "The Library", Jerry is accused of never returning a copy of the book to the public library after borrowing it many years before, during high school, in 1971. It is revealed that the book was stolen by the gym teacher while a gang of jocks were beating up on George. In the present day, the gym teacher still holds the library book, despite being homeless and insane.
- In the 2000 romantic comedy film 100 Girls, the characters Dora and Matthew read an excerpt from Tropic of Cancer together: "Your Sylvester! ... After me you can take on stallions, bulls, rams, drakes, St. Bernards."
- At the beginning of the 2000 movie Final Destination, Clear (Ali Larter) is reading Tropic of Cancer upon arrival at the airport.
- In the 2010 telenovela ¿Dónde Está Elisa? a copy of the book is found in Elisa's locker at school.
- In Season 2 of the television series Ozark Jonah reads an explicit excerpt of the book to Buddy.
- In Season 2 of the television series Ozark a copy of the book is found in the possession of Angelica.

== Typescript ==
The typescript of the book was auctioned for $165,000 in 1986. Yale University owns the typescript, which was displayed to the public in 2001.

== See also ==
- Censorship
- Henry and June (1986 book)
- Henry & June (1990 film)
