= Iris Owens =

American novelist

Iris Owens (1929–2008), also known by her pseudonym, Harriet Daimler, was an American novelist.

== Background ==
Born Iris Klein in Brooklyn, New York, Owens graduated from Brooklyn College. During the 1950s and '60s she lived in Paris, where she was associated with the group of expatriate writers who produced the literary review Merlin, among them Alexander Trocchi, Christopher Logue, John Stevenson, George Plimpton and Richard Seaver. Like Trocchi and Logue, she earned money writing erotic novels for Maurice Girodias's Olympia Press. Owens's four Olympia Press novels, along with a fifth which she coauthored, were published under her pseudonym.

Owens returned to New York in 1970, publishing two more novels under her own name. She remained in New York until her death on May 20, 2008.

== Works ==
=== As Harriet Daimler ===
- Darling (Olympia Press, 1956)
- The Pleasure Thieves (with "Henry Crannach," pseudonym of Marilyn Meeske) (Olympia Press, 1956)
- Innocence (Olympia Press, 1957)
- The Organization (Olympia Press, 1957)
- Woman (reissued as The Woman Thing) (Olympia Press, 1958)

=== As Iris Owens ===
- After Claude (Farrar Straus Giroux, 1973; New York Review of Books NYRB Classics series, 2010).
- Hope Diamond Refuses (Alfred A. Knopf, 1984)
