= My Life and Loves =

Book by Frank Harris

My Life and Loves is the autobiography of the Ireland-born, naturalized-American writer and editor Frank Harris (1856–1931). As published privately by Harris between 1922 and 1927, and by Jack Kahane's Obelisk Press in 1931, the work consisted of four volumes, illustrated with many drawings and photographs of nude women. The book gives a graphic account of Harris's sexual adventures and relates gossip about the sexual activities of celebrities of his day.

The work was banned in both the United States and Britain for 40 years. It first became available in America in 1963. At one time it was sold in Paris for more than $100.

== Additional volume ==
In the early 1950s, Harris's widow Nellie sold about a hundred pages of his writings on further autobiographical matters to Kahane's son Maurice Girodias for a million French francs. Girodias gave the task of producing something publishable from them to Alexander Trocchi, and described the result as having only 20% of its content derived from the nominal source material. It was published by Girodias's Olympia Press in 1954 as My Life and Loves: Fifth Volume.

== Grove Press omnibus edition ==
John F. Gallagher edited, and provided annotations for, a new omnibus edition, My Life and Loves: Five Volumes in One/Complete and Unexpurgated, published by Grove Press in 1963. This edition contained no illustrations. Gallagher described the Trocchi version as "apparently not authentic". James Campbell, comparing the two editions' fifth volumes, does however argue that Girodias's 20% figure was too low.
