= A Singular Man =

Book by J. P. Donleavy

- First edition
- Author: J. P. Donleavy
- Language: English
- Publisher: Little, Brown and Company
- Publication date: November 1963
- Publication place: United States
- Pages: 403

A Singular Man is a 1963 novel by J. P. Donleavy.

First published in Boston, the novel is set in an unnamed city that is believed to be New York and was the author's second novel following the critically acclaimed The Ginger Man.

== Plot introduction ==
The story follows the life of the mysteriously wealthy and aloof George Smith and centers on Smith's love for Miss Tomson, whom in a review, Time magazine referred to as "a genuinely imagined dream figure of sexual grace."

Although Donleavy began work on the novel A Fairy Tale of New York following completion of The Ginger Man, his second completed and published novel was A Singular Man. His interview in The Paris Review # 63 explains why he found it impossible at the time to finish A Fairy Tale of New York but was able to write A Singular Man.

== Characters ==
Main characters include:

- George Smith
- Miss Tomson
- Miss Martin
- Cedric Calvin Bonniface Clementine

== Reception ==
In a review for the National Observer, Hunter S. Thompson referred to Donleavy's novel as "a masterpiece of writing about love" and referred to Donleavy as "a humorist in the only sense of the word that has any dignity."

Newsweek described the book as "excruciatingly funny" but "a darker novel than its predecessor."

Renata Adler praised the book in a review describing it as "a love story, a melodrama, an unresolved detective story, a melodrama, a soap opera, a vaudeville routine, and a very fine light novel by a stylist who can afford to give considerable rein to his rather quirkish imagination."

== Bibliography ==
Donleavy, James Patrick:

- 1963: A Singular Man. - Atlantic-Little, Brown.
