= Exiled in Paris =

1995 book by Scottish cultural historian James Campbell

- Author: James Campbell
- Language: English
- Genre: Non-fiction
- Publication date: 1995

Exiled in Paris is a 1995 (reprinted 2001) book by James Campbell, a Scottish cultural historian specialising in American Literature and culture. He is the former editor of the New Edinburgh Review and works for the Times Literary Supplement. The book is a study of Left Bank cafe society in post-war Paris, particularly the influence of American expatriates, as indicated by its subtitle: Richard Wright, James Baldwin, Samuel Beckett, and Others on the Left Bank.

The time frame of the book's scope, 1946–1960, mirrors that of Richard Wright's arrival in Paris from the US until his death. This begins with the arrival of Wright at Gertrude Stein's Paris apartment, effectively handing the baton over from the pre-war artist-led bohemian Paris of Stein, Anaïs Nin, and Henry Miller to the more literary-focused cafe society. As the subtitle suggests, it also covers Boris Vian and Vladimir Nabokov. It ranges through the existentialism of Albert Camus, Simone de Beauvoir, and Jean-Paul Sartre, African-American writers such as James Baldwin and Chester Himes, as well as Frantz Fanon and Sadegh Hedayat.

The book also considers Maurice Girodias' Olympia Press, particularly Alexander Trocchi's contribution and the influence of Trocchi's literary magazine Merlin, which included Samuel Beckett and Sartre as contributors. The book ends by assessing the influence of the Beat Hotel, which saw the familiar ensemble of Beat writers including Allen Ginsberg and William S. Burroughs in Paris. The last vestiges of this era can be found at Shakespeare and Company.

According to a review in Publishers Weekly, "Campbell successfully evokes the flavor of Parisian cafe life in this memoir that will be of great interest to literature devotees."

Campbell subsequently wrote that Exiled in Paris had "been shaped from a rib taken from an earlier book, Talking at the Gates: A Life of James Baldwin (1991), which contains a lengthy section on Baldwin's life in Paris in the 1950s. Now, a fragment of the Paris book provided the bones for This Is the Beat Generation [1999]. The word 'trilogy' sounds too grandiose, but I think of the three of them as a family."

In the United Kingdom, the book was issued as Paris Interzone, a reference to Burroughs.

== Other books by the author ==
- Talking at the Gates: A Life of James Baldwin (1991)
- This Is the Beat Generation: New York, San Francisco, Paris (2001)
- Invisible Country: A Journey through Scotland (1984)
