= Young Adam (film) =

- Theatrical release poster
- Directed by: David Mackenzie
- Screenplay by: David Mackenzie
- Based on: Young Adam by Alexander Trocchi
- Produced by: Jeremy Thomas
- Starring: Ewan McGregor; Tilda Swinton; Peter Mullan; Emily Mortimer
- Cinematography: Giles Nuttgens
- Edited by: Colin Monie
- Music by: David Byrne
- Production companies: Recorded Picture Company; UK Film Council; StudioCanal; Scottish Screen; HanWay Films
- Distributed by: Warner Bros. Pictures (United Kingdom); Vision International (France)
- Release dates: 26 September 2003 (United Kingdom); 21 April 2004 (France)
- Running time: 98 minutes
- Countries: United Kingdom; France
- Language: English
- Budget: £4 million ($6.4 million)
- Box office: $2.5 million

Young Adam is a 2003 neo-noir erotic drama film written and directed by David Mackenzie and starring Ewan McGregor, Tilda Swinton, Peter Mullan, Ewan Stewart and Emily Mortimer. The film is based on the 1954 novel of the same name by Alexander Trocchi.

The film was released in the United Kingdom on 26 September 2003 by Warner Bros. Pictures.

== Plot ==
In 1954 Scotland, shiftless young drifter Joe Taylor works on a coal barge which operates from Glasgow, on the River Clyde, along the Forth and Clyde and Union Canals to Edinburgh. He shares the cramped on-board living quarters with its owners and operators, husband and wife Les and Ella Gault, and their young son Jim.

One day, Joe and Les pull the body of a young woman, Cathy Dimly, naked except for a petticoat, from the water; they cover her and hand the body over to the authorities. After Cathy's body has been taken away by the police, Joe and Les sit on the barge discussing theories as to what happened to Cathy. In a flashback it is revealed that Joe has seen Les and Ella having problems in the bedroom, with Les' drinking making him unable to perform. Joe goes into explicit detail theorising what may have happened to Cathy, with Ella present. Joe and Les work for the day, before washing and agreeing to go to a nearby pub to play darts. As they sit on the barge after dinner, Joe caresses Ella under the table. Joe and Les go the pub and sit there chatting with other patrons about Cathy, before Joe makes his excuses to leave and return to the barge. Back on the barge, Joe makes an advance on Ella, who succumbs, and not wanting to disturb the sleeping Jim, the two go outside the barge to have sex on the towpath. Les returns and initially senses an atmosphere between Joe and Ella, although when Ella snaps at him he changes the subject back to Cathy.

In the past, it turns out that despite not having said anything about knowing her, Joe knew Cathy, an office worker. The two had met on a beach, with an immediate attraction between them. In the present, Jim falls off the barge into an oncoming barge, Joe swiftly dives into the water and rescues him. The Gaults, and Joe, go to an amusement arcade together. The arcade closes due to heavy rain, with Les, Jim and a friend going off to the cinema, and Joe going back to the barge. Despite initially resisting him, Ella and Joe have sex once more.

In the past, Joe and Cathy meet by chance, and reflect on the end of their relationship, and Joe's unrealised plans to move to China. They go to the waterfront and have passionate sex beneath a parked truck.

Joe and Ella's relationship becomes ever more daring, with the two engaging in passionate clinches while Les is up on deck.

In the past, on the waterfront, Cathy reveals she is two months pregnant with Joe's child. This causes an argument between them, in which Cathy reveals she has been seeing another man, a plumber called Dan. When Joe begins to walk off, she runs after him, when she reaches for his arm to hold and he withdraws it, she trips and falls into the cold water while dressed only in her petticoat. Joe stays on the embankment, repeating her name several times, but making no move to rescue her and when she fails to surface, he panics, disposes of her belongings, and runs away.

Joe is still traumatized by the loss of Cathy, carrying her photo, and the engraved mirror from her, with him at all times. The newspaper reports that Daniel Gordon, the plumber whom Cathy was casually seeing, has been arrested and is being tried for her murder. The lack of discretion between Joe and Ella results in Les finding out about their affair. After initially losing his temper, Les calms down and agrees to move out of the barge, which belongs to Ella. Ella and Joe drift into a more serious relationship, although much of the appeal has gone for Joe.

In the past, Joe and Cathy are on a boat on a lake, Joe rocks the boat which makes Cathy afraid as she can't swim, before the couple make love on the boat.

Joe is rapidly losing interest in his relationship with Ella, with the two having a disagreement over Cathy's death, and the upcoming court hearing of the accused, Daniel Gordon. Joe is ready to tell Ella the truth about his relationship with Cathy, but Ella is not interested. Joe has now taken over all Les' duties on the barge.

We see a typewriter on the canal bed. In the past, Joe is sitting at a typewriter, struggling to write.

Les meets the barge on an embankment to collect his things, which Joe gives him. Joe offers Les a cup of tea, but Ella sends him back to work. Les says that he has been called as a witness in the court case relating to Cathy's death. Ella states her intention to go to a lawyer and formalise a divorce from Les. Ella tells Joe that Les has told her that barges may cease to be a profitable business in coming years as road transport returns, and that she is indifferent to this after spending her life on the barges. She shares her plans with Joe to divorce Les, and hopefully buy a nice house by Edinburgh to live in with Joe, and Jim, as a family. Joe, an adventurer, pleasure seeker, is unenthusiastic at this. Jim is opently hostile to Joe, and sees him and his mother passionately making love through a slit. Although the physical side of their relationship remains strong, Joe's interest is clearly waning. He continues to receive his salary from Ella, as a salaried barge worker.

When Ella receives word her brother-in-law Sam has died in an accident at work, she and Joe visit her sister Gwen. At Gwen's home, there is an immediate attraction between Gwen and Joe. Ella invites Gwen to spend a couple of weeks with them on the barge, and one evening, on the pretext Gwen would like to see a movie, she and Joe leave the barge and go to a pub. Tho two briefly spend time in the pub, with Gwen seeing that Joe is still carrying a photo of Cathy with him. They finish their drinks, and go to have sex in an alleyway. Upon returning to the barge, Ella soon realises that the two have engaged in sexual activity, and refuses to embrace Joe. Joe goes to a city pub for some drinks, where patrons are speaking about Cathy's case.

In the past, we see that Joe and Cathy had a tempestuous relationship, with Cathy who is working to support the two frustrated by Joe's inability to make any meaningful progress writing his book. The two argue, with Joe throwing custard and other foodstuffs over Cathy, and then, with Cathy crying, covered in various foodstuffs, the two have rough sex, before Joe gets up and leaves, returning later to affectionately embrace the sleeping Cathy.

Joe returns to the barge from the pub, to find Gwen drunk on gin. When Gwen tells him Ella has returned to Les, Joe immediately gets his belongings and leaves. Drinking at a pub, Joe meets a man, Bill, who agrees to take him in as a lodger. Joe immediately begins a loveless affair with the man's wife, Connie, his landlady.

The court case into Cathy's death begins, with Joe attending in the public galleries of the courtroom. He is pleased to hear a friend of Cathy's statement of him having 'gone to China', effectively absolving him of guilt.

In the past, Joe and Cathy tearfully break up outside Cathy's flat, with Joe saying that he is going to China. The two kiss, and Joe takes his things and leaves. Joe throws his typewriter in the canal, spelling the end of his aspirations to be a writer. Meeting each other for the first time, Les sees him doing this, and asks why.

Joe watches Les give his testimony to the court, he also sees Ella there accompanying him, before travelling back to his lodgings by bus. On the way he sees a woman who from behind looks like Cathy, but is not. Upon returning, Joe tells Connie that he believes the accused man is not guilty. Connie tells Joe that they will hang him anyway. The court case proceeds, and it becomes clear that the accused man, Daniel Gordon, will be found guilty.

In the past, we see Cathy's lifeless body floating in the water.

Continuing to attend the court case, which seems certain to result in the conviction of the innocent Daniel Gordon, guilt-stricken Joe writes an anonymous note absolving Daniel of the crime, but not incriminating himself. He leaves the note for a courthouse clerk to find, which he does, but it has no effect on the trial. Joe watches on as Daniel is found guilty by a unanimous jury verdict and sentenced to be hanged. Upset at the conviction of an innocent man, but not willing to risk his own life, Joe takes his things and leaves town, calling in on the spot Cathy fell into the water, throwing the engraved mirror she gave him at the spot she fell and died.

== Cast ==
- Ewan McGregor as Joe Taylor
- Tilda Swinton as Ella Gault
- Peter Mullan as Les Gault, Ella's husband
- Emily Mortimer as Cathy Dimly
- Therese Bradley as Gwen
- Ewan Stewart as Daniel Gordon
- Jack McElhone as Jim Gault, Ella and Les's son
- Stuart McQuarrie as Bill
- Rory McCann as Sam
- Pauline Turner as Connie

== Production ==
The film was shot on location in Gullane in East Lothian, along the Union Canals from Edinburgh to Falkirk, on the Forth and Clyde and in Clydebank, Dumbarton, Renton in West Dunbartonshire, Grangemouth and Perth and Kinross.

The film was scored by David Byrne and the soundtrack was released under the title Lead Us Not into Temptation.

Talking about the rough sex scene with Ewan McGregor, Emily Mortimer said, "There's something really liberating about letting it rip and just going for it. There's no way in real life you'll ever be allowed to get up to all that - I mean, unless you were really into kinky stuff."

== Release ==
The film was screened in the Un Certain Regard section at the 2003 Cannes Film Festival. It was also shown at the Moscow Film Festival, the Edinburgh Film Festival, the Telluride Film Festival, the Toronto International Film Festival and the Athens Film Festival.

Warner Bros. Pictures pre-bought the film's distribution rights for the United Kingdom while Sony Pictures Classics acquired the North American distribution rights. When the film was released in the United States, the Motion Picture Association of America rated it NC-17 for "some explicit sexual content," notably a 14-second scene depicting oral sex.

=== Home media ===
The film was released in the United Kingdom on DVD by Warner Home Video on 29 March 2004. The North American DVD was released by Columbia TriStar Home Entertainment on 14 September 2004. It is in anamorphic widescreen format with audio tracks in English and French and subtitles in French. Bonus features include commentary by screenwriter/director David Mackenzie; commentary by Mackenzie, film editor Colin Monie, production designer Laurence Dorman, and actress Tilda Swinton; narration by Ewan McGregor that was deleted prior to the film's release; and an extended scene which is cut missing in the R-rated version but present in the NC-17 version.

== Reception ==
=== Critical response ===
Young Adam holds a 62% approval rating on review aggregate Rotten Tomatoes, based on 124 reviews, with an average rating of 6.3/10. The critical consensus states that the film is "A grim mood piece with good performances from the leads." On Metacritic, the film has a score of 67 out of 100 based on 32 critics, indicating "generally favorable reviews".

Philip French of The Guardian called it "a cleverly constructed film that holds the attention throughout its economical 95 minutes. The naturalistic acting has considerable power, with Tilda Swinton giving a characteristically unself-regarding performance and Ewan McGregor steering clear of easy charm. But it is a depressing film exuding hopelessness and inviting us to pity the characters rather than share in their tragic condition."

A.O. Scott of the New York Times observed, "The storytelling is deliberately disjointed, jumping back and forth in time without warning, so that the meaning of events and the connections among them emerge retrospectively. This creates a mood of unease and dislocation, a noirish dread that persists even after certain crucial mysteries are solved. The narrative scheme, the brooding period atmosphere, the understated score (by David Byrne) and the precision of the acting also make the story seem more interesting than it is. Joe, though in some ways fairly passive, is sexually voracious as well as sexually irresistible . . . In the end, Joe's sexuality, while exhibited with quite a bit more explicitness than the old movies would permit, is also what makes Young Adam feel most dated. Its view of male narcissism, as expressed through erotic need, is not only uncritical but also pretentious. The film follows the novel (and many others like it) in assuming, rather than proving, that its hero's selfishness and failure offer clues to the human condition, rather than evidence of individual limitation."

Manohla Dargis of the Los Angeles Times observed, "Unlike the novel, which is written in the first person . . . the film assumes a markedly less claustrophobic, less personal point of view. Everything happens more or less through Joe's eyes, but Mackenzie, having rejected a voice-over narration, never gets inside the character the way Martin Scorsese gets inside Travis Bickle in Taxi Driver . . . While the novel turns Joe into a question mark, Mackenzie takes a more palatable, less ambiguous approach to the character. The casting of McGregor also softens Joe. Even tamped down and without his easy smile, the actor conveys so much natural charm he's a sorry excuse for a moral void. These changes compromise the adaptation but generally improve the story since Trocchi's existentialism has neither the heft of Jean-Paul Sartre nor the pulp pleasures of James M. Cain. Mackenzie may have realized the shortcomings in Trocchi's prose or decided he didn't want to condemn his film commercially. Whichever the case, he has greatly tempered the story's brutality the old-fashioned way: He puts an appealing, sympathetic star at the center and surrounds him with beautiful visuals, with a darkly contrasting color palette of bruising black and blue."

Carla Meyer of the San Francisco Chronicle thought Tilda Swinton's "rich, compelling performance is reason enough to see this uneven picture, which devolves from a riveting romantic triangle to a morality tale without a moral center . . . McGregor has trouble negotiating the role of a man playing at life. He excels at showing the writer's vanity (in captain's hat and jacket, McGregor looks like a rent boy), but not what makes him tick."

Mike Clark of USA Today noted, "This movie is so much the opposite of uplifting that you think Gary Oldman ought to be in it. But it's honestly made, and its second half does linger in the memory."

Derek Elley of Variety called the film "strongly cast" and "a resonant, beautifully modulated relationships drama" that "establishes Mackenzie as an accessible stylist within mid-range [contemporary] British cinema.

=== Box office ===
It earned $1,135,673 in the United Kingdom and $2,561,820 worldwide.

== Awards and nominations ==
BAFTA Scotland named it Best Film and honored Ewan McGregor as Best Actor in a Scottish Film, Tilda Swinton as Best Actress in a Scottish Film, and David Mackenzie as Best Director.

McGregor, Swinton, Mackenzie, and the film all were nominated for British Independent Film Awards.

The Director's Guild of Great Britain nominated Mackenzie for the DGGB Award for Outstanding Directorial Achievement in British Film. He won the award for Best New British Feature at the Edinburgh International Film Festival and the London Film Critics' Circle Award for British Newcomer of the Year. London Film Critic's Circle nominations went to the film for Best Film and Ewan McGregor for British Actor of the Year, Tilda Swinton for British Actress of the Year, Emily Mortimer for British Supporting Actress of the Year, and Mackenzie for British Director of the Year and British Screenwriter of the Year.
