= Sinclair Beiles =

South African beat poet (1930–2000)

- Sinclair Beiles circa 1998 in Johannesburg
- Born: 1930; Kampala, Uganda
- Died: 3 November 2000 (aged 69–70); Johannesburg, South Africa
- Occupations: Poet, writer
- Writing career
- Notable work: ‘’Ashes of Experience’’ (1969)
- Notable awards: Ingrid Jonker Prize
- Movements: Beat, postmodernism

Sinclair Beiles (b. Kampala, Uganda, 1930–2000, Johannesburg) was a South African beat poet and editor for Maurice Girodias at the Olympia Press in Paris. He developed along with William S. Burroughs and Brion Gysin the cut-up technique of writing poetry and literature. He won the 1969 Ingrid Jonker Prize for poetry for his collection, Ashes of Experience.

== Early life ==
Beiles was born in Uganda to Jewish South African parents of Russian descent. The family returned to live in Johannesburg when he was six years old. He graduated with a BA from the University of the Witwatersrand, having majored in Anthropology.

== Career ==
In 1953, he left South Africa and spent long periods living in Greece, Paris, London and the Netherlands. He rented a room at the legendary Beat Hotel in Paris and worked for Maurice Girodias at Olympia Press. He published a pseudonymous erotic book for Olympia’s Traveler’s Companion series.

Beiles collaborated with the writer, William S. Burroughs as an editor for the latter's Naked Lunch.

In 1960, he was a co-author of "Minutes to Go" with William S. Burroughs, Gregory Corso and Brion Gysin. The publication was a book of cut up poetry and Beiles was instrumental to its publication. Oliver Harris, who wrote the introduction to the 2020 edition of the book, wrote of the cut-ups by Beiles as "stand[ing] out from the rest because of their density and specificity of reference and their evocation of contemporary political and military conflicts." Harris added that "Beiles’s insistence on combining formal experiment with a specifically African colonial content adds an important political dimension."

Beiles later produced other cut-up poetry, most notable, "Explosion Apartheid", a prose text with a short story structure and dialogue between nameless characters.

In both "Minutes to Go" and "Explosion Apartheid", Beiles used texts about Africa and African literature, reasoning that they were "an antidote to the absurd South African Black/White duet or spiritual deadlock. They guaranteed a way out."

In Paris, Beiles also became acquainted with James Baldwin and formed a friendship with Richard Wright as they shared an interest in Haiku poetry.

He also worked with the Greek artist Takis and read his magnetic manifesto -- "I am a sculpture... I would like to see all nuclear bombs on Earth turned into sculptures"—in 1960 in Paris at the Iris Clert Gallery. At this event he was famously suspended in mid-air by a magnetic field from a powerful magnet in a sculpture developed by Takis. Beiles attributed his subsequent mental instability to this experience even though he insisted that Takis provide him with a helmet to protect his head from the magnetic field.

In 1991, A South African Abroad, a collection of Beiles' earlier poetry was published, with Burroughs writing "the poetry of Sinclair Beiles is distinguished and long-distilled; its unexpected, striking images bring a flash of surprised recognition. These poems open slowly in your mind, like Japanese paper flowers in water."

He also worked with the Greek artist Takis and read his magnetic manifesto: "I am a sculpture... I would like to see all nuclear bombs on Earth turned into sculptures"—in 1960 in Paris at the Iris Clert Gallery. At this event he was famously suspended in mid-air by a magnetic field from a powerful magnet in a sculpture developed by Takis. Beiles attributed his subsequent mental instability to this experience even though he insisted that Takis provide him with a helmet to protect his head from the magnetic field.

In 1979, he returned to live in South Africa and settled in the bohemian enclave of Yeoville in inner-city Johannesburg. He became associated with the Johannesburg-based Gallery III group of poets, writers, composers and performance artists. He and the South African columnist and playwright Ian Fraser formed a friendship which lasted many years. The poet had a burst of writing activity from 1991 to 2000, publishing a large number of poetry collections, including A South African Abroad (Lapis Press, 1991). He died in relative poverty.

The independent filmmaker Anton Kotze made a short film called "Sacred Fix" (26 minutes, South Africa, 1997), which is a documentary portrait of Sinclair Beiles.

In the final decade of his life, he became increasingly isolated in Yeoville, once a bohemian centre for artists, which then experienced white flight, increasing crime and urban decay.

== Legacy ==
A collection of writings about Sinclair Beiles called Who was Sinclair Beiles? was published by Dye Hard Press, Johannesburg, in 2009, co-edited by Gary Cummiskey and Eva Kowalska.

== Works by Sinclair Beiles ==
- (S. B. as) Wu Wu Ming: Houses of Joy. Olympia Press, Paris, 1959.
- S. B., William S. Burroughs, Brion Gysin, Gregory Corso: Minutes To Go. Two Cities Editions, Paris 1960
- Ashes of Experience. Wurm, 1969
- Deliria. Cold Turkey Press, Rotterdam 1971. Edited by Gerard Bellaart.
- Tales: Poems. Gryphon Poets, 1972
- Sacred Fix. Cold Turkey Press, Rotterdam, 1975
- Universal Truths as Revealed in White Tobacco Fumes. Writers Forum, London. 1976.
- Ballets, 1978
- Dowsings, 1980
- Poems Under Suspicion, Poems On Bits Of Paper (with Marta Proctor) 1982
- The Crucifixion, Two Cities, 1984
- A South African Abroad, Lapis Press, 1991
- On-Stage, Limited Editions, 1994
- Aardvark City, or Hieronymous Hotel, Limited Editions, 1994
- Khakiweeds, Limited Editions, 1995
- Deliria. Small Spaces Press, 1995. First edition: Cold Turkey Press, Rotterdam, 1971.
- Yeoville: Poems, Nugget Press, 1996
- Sugar, Nugget Press, 1996
- Plays (Harlem King of the Negroes; My Brother Frederico; Chopin in Majorca), Nugget Press, 1996
- The Greek Plays (Electra; Punch and Judy; Genesis; Mme Sausolito), Nugget Press 1996
- 3 Plays (Picasso by Max Jacob; Suzanne Valedon; Colette), Nugget Press, 1996
- The Golden Years, Nugget Press, 1997
- Nagmaal, Nugget Press, 1997
- Bicycle Tales, Nugget Press, 1997
- Springtime at Raubenheimers, Nugget Press, 1998
- Women, Nugget Press 2000
- A Jew Takes A Look At Guatemala, Nugget Press, 2000
- The Idiot's Voice, Cold Turkey Press 2012
- Bone Hebrew, Cold Turkey Press 2013

== Personal life ==
Beiles had bipolar disorder, then known as manic depression and this informed his work.

Beiles returned to South Africa in the 1970s and later married the poet, Marta Proctor. The couple lived together in Yeoville, then a bohemian neighbourhood of artists, filmmakers and writers.

He died in Johannesburg General Hospital on 3 November 2000 at the age of 70. He was buried at West Park Cemetery on 7 November.
