= Oliver Harris =

Oliver Harris may refer to:

- Oliver Harris (academic), British academic
- Oliver Harris (author) (born 1978), British crime novelist
- Oliver Harris (trade unionist) (1873–1944), Welsh politician
- Harris (rapper) (born 1976), German rapper
