= Lillian Garrett-Groag =

Argentine playwright, theatre director and actor

Lillian Groag
- Born: Liliana C. Groag; Buenos Aires, Argentina
- Occupations: Writer, director, playwright, actress
- Years active: 1973–present

Lillian Groag (born Liliana C. Groag) is an Argentine-American playwright, theater director, and actress. Her plays include The Ladies of the Camellias, The Magic Fire, and The White Rose.

== Early life and career ==
Lillian Groag was born in Buenos Aires, Argentina, to a Viennese father and an Italian mother. Her father had fled to Argentina in 1938 when Austria joined Nazi Germany. When Lillian was only seven years old her family fled from Argentina to Montevideo, Uruguay, but this time they were fleeing from the Juan Domingo Perón dictatorship. Her father would die seven years later in Uruguay. Lillian was schooled in Catholic boarding schools in both Argentina and Uruguay her entire life until she came to Lake Forest College in Chicago, United States, and the University of Dijon in France. She would later go on to earn masters and doctoral degrees in Romance Languages and Literature from Northwestern University.

While attending both Lake Forest College and Northwestern she appeared in many plays. It was during her performance while at Northwestern in the play, "A Lion in Winter" that she was spotted by a Hollywood talent agent who persuaded her to move to Los Angeles to pursue an acting career in TV and movies. She went on to have guest appearances on several TV shows before shifting her focus more to the theater and plays as well as writing.

== Theater career ==
Miss Groag has acted, directed and written for many regional theatres in the country, Broadway and Off, as well as opera houses. Her plays have also had long runs in Germany, Italy, Mexico and Japan.

In 1993, Groag acted as part of an ensemble cast in The Kentucky Cycle at the Kennedy Center in Washington, D.C., and on Broadway at the Royale theatre. For this performance she received a Helen Hayes Award for Outstanding Supporting Performer in 1994.

In 1997, Groag's play The Magic Fire premiered at the Oregon Shakespeare Festival. She received a Kennedy Center Fund for New American Plays (FNAP) to support this.

== Works ==
=== Plays ===
The Ladies of the Camellias is a farce about an imagined meeting in Paris, 1897, between the famous theater divas Sarah Bernhardt and Eleonora Duse. They are each to start in separate productions of The Lady of the Camellias on successive nights.

The Magic Fire is a play about an immigrant family in Buenos Aires during the 1950s regime of Juan Perón. They take refuge from the fascist politics of Argentina in art and opera. Eventually, events force them to confront the politics and their moral obligations. Premiered in 1997 at the Oregon Shakespeare Festival. Performed (among other times) in 2006 at the Shaw Festival.

The White Rose is a play about resistance by German university students to Hitler's Nazi Germany, pivoting around a young student Sophie and a police inspector Mohr.

Midons, a play about the Troubadours in Provence and the "invention of love". A Monty Python-type farce with serious undertones. Produced by The People's Light and Theatre Company in Philadelphia.

Menocchio, a play about the famous real-life trial of miller Domenico Scandella in the Friuli region in 1600. Scandella propounded about evolution, socialism and doubted the existence of God. A comedy. Produced by the Berkeley Repertory Theatre.

Blood Wedding, translated and adapted by Garrett-Groag from a Spanish play by Federico García Lorca, is a play about a cycle of murder and revenge in an imagined setting in rural Spain.

War Music (2009), based on Christopher Logue's modernist rewrite of Homer's Iliad.

=== Translations and Adaptations ===
- A Flaw in the Ointment by Georges Feydeau. Performed in 1993–94 by the Seattle Rep.
- The Triumph of Love by Pierre Marivaux. Adapted from a new translation by Frederick Kluck. Performed in 2007 by California Shakespeare Theater and San Jose Rep.
- Blood Wedding - Garcia Lorca - Guthrie Theater
- Liliom - Molnar - Missouri Rep

=== Productions directed ===
1993: "Tosca" (Puccini), Virginia Opera 1995: "La Boheme", Virginia Opera

"SIMÓN BOLÍVAR" – World Premiere – January 1995 Virginia Opera.

1998: Scapin, the Cheat, (Molière), California Shakespeare Theater.

2000: The Taming of the Shrew, California Shakespeare Theater.

2003: Arms and the Man (Shaw), California Shakespeare Theater.

2005: The Tempest, California Shakespeare Theater.

2007: The Triumph of Love (Marivaux), California Shakespeare Theater and San Jose Rep.

The Rivals - A.C.T. in San Francisco

A Flaw in the Ointment - Seattle Rep

Menocchio - Berkeley Rep

Napoli Milionaria and The Magic Fire - Milwaukee Rep

Midons and The Imaginary Invalid - People's Light and Theatre Company, Philadelphia

Enter the Guardsman and The Triumph of Love - San Jose Rep

Death and the Maiden - Center Stage, Baltimore

School for Scandal and Merry Wives of Windsor - at Oregon Shakespeare Festival

Smash - Asolo Repertory Theatre

Liliom - Missouri Rep OPERA - Virginia Opera, Glimmerglass Opera, New York City Opera, Boston Lyric, Cincinnati, Chicago Opera Theatre, San Jose Opera, Florida Grand Opera.

Representation: Beth Blickers, Abrams Artists Agency - New York / Robert Slotover - Allied Artists, U.K. 2010: "Cosi Fan Tutte", Virginia Opera 2013: "Marriage of Figaro" Virginia Opera

== Awards ==
- 1994: Helen Hayes Award for Outstanding Supporting Performer
- 1996: Kennedy Center's Fund for New American Plays (FNAP) grant, for The Magic Fire at Oregon Shakespeare Festival.
- AT&T American Plays - "The White Rose"
- TCG - Playwright in Residence grant, Center Stage, Baltimore. "Menocchio".

== See also ==
OPERA PRODUCTIONS at:

New York City Opera, Glimmerglass Opera, Virginia Opera, Florida Grand Opera, Chicago Opera Theatre, Opera San Jose, Boston Lyric Opera. Opera Omaha

== Notes ==
Representation:

Beth Blickers - Abrams Artists Agency New York/ Robert Slotover - Allied Artists U.K.
