= Young Adam =

1954 novel by Alexander Trocchi

- Heinemann, 1961 First UK edition cover
- Author: Alexander Trocchi
- Language: English UK
- Published: 1954 (Olympia Press) (1st edition); 1961 (Heinemann) (2nd English edition)
- Publication place: France
- Media type: Print (Hardcover and Paperback)
- Pages: 168 pp (Rebel paperback edition 1999)
- ISBN: 978-0-86241-905-9 (Rebel paperback edition 1999)
- OCLC: 43418858
- Dewey Decimal: 823/.914 21
- LC Class: PR6070.R56 Y6 1999

Young Adam is a 1954 novel by Alexander Trocchi which tells the story of Joe, a young man who labours on the river barges of Glasgow, and who discovers the body of a young woman floating in the canal. The novel focuses on the relationship between Joe and his companions on the barge – a husband, Les and his younger wife, Ella – and it becomes clearer as the novel progresses that Joe is connected to the dead woman he found.

This story was adapted into film as Young Adam in 2003 starring Ewan McGregor, Tilda Swinton and Peter Mullan.
