= Cain's Book =

Book by Alexander Trocchi

- First edition (publ. Grove Press)
- Author: Alexander Trocchi
- Publisher: Grove Press
- Publication date: January 1, 1960

Cain's Book is a 1960 novel by Scottish Beat writer Alexander Trocchi. A roman à clef, it details the life of Joe Necchi, a heroin addict and writer, who is living and working on a scow on the Hudson River in New York.

The book alternates between Necchi/Trocchi's attempts to score and flashbacks to his experiences as a child in Glasgow, and later as a young man in London and Paris. It is also an account of what it means to be a junky and an outsider from society. On occasion it can descend into ranting about the hypocrisy and stupidity of drug prohibition and the general inequities of the world. It describes with an eye for detail the rituals of heroin, the cooking up and the search for a suitable vein.

In 1963 in the UK, Cain's Book was one of many books and magazines seized by the police at a bookseller's shop in Sheffield. Its publisher, John Calder, sought a separate trial for Cain's Book distinguishing it from the hundreds of others that had been confiscated, intending to prevail on the book's literary merit as Penguin Books had done four years before in the trial of Lady Chatterley's Lover. Cain's Book had been published without restriction in the US and France. In April 1964 the UK edition went to trial for obscenity, with six defense witnesses, including author Kenneth Allsop, testifying to its literary value. Three magistrates found against Calder. The case is notable in that the court's judgement was the first in the UK to condemn a book for obscenity not for sexual content but for "the lifestyle it advocated." Alistair McCleery wrote, "The case gave a new lease of life to the use of obscenity charges against literary works where it could be argued that illegal behavior or behavior detrimental to social norms was being promoted." In response to the unfavorable verdict Trocchi held a public burning of his book, with fireworks.
