= Beefy =

Beefy may refer to:

- Beef, meat obtained from bovines, or related concepts.
- A flavour of Seabrook Potato Crisps
- Ian Botham, an English cricketer nicknamed "Beefy"
- Beefy, a fictional character in the novel The Beastly Beatitudes of Balthazar B
- Beefy (artist), the stage name of Keith Alan Moore, a Nerdcore hip hop artist
- Beefy Dan, a fictional character in the British comic The Beezer
- Beefy Jones, a novel by English author Eric Malpass
- Beefy Louis, a fictional character on the American television show The Sinbad Show
- Beefy Smith, a fictional character in the Disney film Follow Me, Boys!
