= The Hollow Man =

Hollow Man or The Hollow Man may refer to:

- The Hollow Man (1935 novel), a locked room mystery novel by John Dickson Carr
- The Hollow Man (1992 novel), a science fiction novel by the US writer Dan Simmons
- The Hollow Man (2011 novel), a London-based crime thriller by Oliver Harris
- Hollow Man, a 2000 science fiction film inspired by H. G. Wells' The Invisible Man
- Hollow Man 2, the film's 2006 sequel, starring Christian Slater
- "Hollow Man" (song), a 2008 single by American alternative rock band R.E.M.
- Hollowman, a 1993 EP by Entombed
- "The Hollow Man", a 1994 single by Marillion from the album Brave
- "Hollow Man", a 2024 song by Bon Jovi from the album Forever

== See also ==
- The Hollow Men (disambiguation)
