= Maurice Girodias =

French publisher (1919–1990)

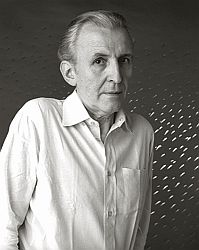
- Girodias photographed by Gilles Larrain
- Born: Maurice Kahane; 12 April 1919; Paris, France
- Died: 3 July 1990 (aged 71); Paris, France
- Occupation: Book publisher
- Parent: Jack Kahane (1887–1939)

Maurice Girodias (12 April 1919 – 3 July 1990) was a French publisher who founded the Olympia Press, specialising in risqué books, censored in Britain and America, that were permitted in France in English-language versions only. It evolved from his father’s Obelisk Press, famous for publishing Henry Miller’s Tropic of Cancer. Girodias published Vladimir Nabokov's Lolita, J. P. Donleavy’s The Ginger Man (involving a 20-year lawsuit), and works by Samuel Beckett, William S. Burroughs, Iris Owens, John Glassco and Christopher Logue.

== Early life ==
Girodias was born Maurice Kahane in Paris, France, the son of Manchester-born Jack Kahane and a French heiress, Marcelle (née Girodias). His father was Jewish and his mother was Catholic. Girodias lived a relatively idyllic childhood until the Depression forced his father to take up a new profession in Paris, publishing risqué books in English for the consumption of foreign tourists, who because of censorship could not obtain such materials at home. French censorship laws had a loophole allowing English works to be published without domestic confiscation.

Kahane's venture (Girodias later took his mother's birth name to hide his partially Jewish background from the Nazis) was called Obelisk Press. It published notorious works by Frank Harris, Henry Miller and Anaïs Nin, as well as several pieces of light erotica written by Kahane himself.

Girodias's involvement with his father's business started early. In 1934, at the age of 15, Girodias drew the disturbing crab picture seen on the original cover of Tropic of Cancer. After his father's early death in 1939, Girodias took over publishing duties, and at the age of 20 managed to survive Paris, World War II, Occupation and paper shortages.

After the war, with his brother Eric Kahane, Girodias expanded operations, publishing Zorba the Greek (in French) and Henry Miller's Sexus, among other texts. The latter volume touched off a firestorm in France, with trials and arrests for obscenity. The 'Affaire Miller' ended with Girodias out of jail, but bankrupt and no longer in control of his company.

== The Olympia Press ==
Expatriate writer Austryn Wainhouse introduced Girodias to a number of writers living in Paris associated with Merlin, a literary review; in order "to publish books legally in Paris, [Merlin] needed to demonstrate to the French authorities it had a French business partner." Girodias famously advised the group that the way out of poverty was for everyone to come and write dirty books for his new venture Olympia Press, which took its name from the similarity to his father's company, and Manet's famous portrait of a courtesan.

Among those who wrote for Girodias in the early days were American author Henry Miller, Samuel Beckett, John Glassco and Christopher Logue. Alexander Trocchi, John Stevenson (Marcus Van Heller), Glassco and Logue penned "db's" ("dirty books") for the Atlantic Library Series, a short-lived line of erotica. Beckett published Watt and his Malone Trilogy through the more literary Collection Merlin. The South African poet Sinclair Beiles was an editor at Olympia.

After several police crackdowns, Girodias shifted his imprints, replacing the Atlantic Library with the Traveller's Companion Series, beginning with The Enormous Bed by John Coleman. Legal difficulties persuaded Girodias to include less openly erotic and more literary works in the series, and number six, Denny Bryant's Tender Was My Flesh, was followed by The Ginger Man, by J. P. Donleavy.

Other famous titles published in the Traveller's Companion Series were Lolita by Vladimir Nabokov, The Naked Lunch by William S. Burroughs, a translation of Story of O by Pauline Réage, and Candy by Mason Hoffenberg and Terry Southern.

The Olympia Press also published The S.C.U.M. Manifesto, which has since been published by other publishers and excerpted.

Other Olympia Press imprints included Ophir Books, Ophelia Press and Othello Books.

=== The Ginger Man ===
Girodias, very much against Donleavy's intention, published The Ginger Man as pornography. He seemed unable to grasp the literary merit of the work. When he did belatedly understand that he had a brilliant and original book, instead of acknowledging this, he tried to steal the rights from the author. Girodias and Donleavy sued each other back and forth for a period of 20 years following the publication of The Ginger Man. This litigation continued, even after Girodias' bankruptcy, when at auction Donleavy's wife bought the rights to the Olympia Press.

Analysis of the original manuscript for The Ginger Man shows, in Donleavy's words, "a few major blunders and distinctly misplaced paragraphs and an odd misprint here and there, but the work with these exceptions had meticulously followed the manuscript". Donleavy won almost every case, though it was an expensive ordeal for both parties.

=== Lolita ===
A complicated arrangement accorded the Olympia Press roughly one-third of the royalties for Lolita after the novel's breakthrough success in America. However, Girodias lost this share when he failed to pay Nabokov on time for the French royalties.

=== Marcus van Heller ===
Girodias used to reprint the successful works of some authors under another imprint belonging to him (Ophelia Press) without the knowledge of the respective authors, in order to avoid giving them royalties for new editions. This was one of the main reasons that determined John Stevenson to end the collaboration with Girodias in 1961. In the years 1955–1961, under the pen name Marcus van Heller, Stevenson was the most prolific writer for the "Traveller's Companion" series, turning his pen name into a brand of sorts. Afterwards, Girodias used the fact that the real identity behind Marcus van Haller was largely unknown, commissioning other writers to publish new novels under this pen name.

== Legal troubles ==
=== Criminal ===
Girodias consistently ran into difficulties with the authorities throughout his career. The Paris police, often pressured by British customs, seized and destroyed many copies of his books. The courts would fine him, and by 1963 he found he had to leave Paris, first for Copenhagen, then for America, where Customs agents destroyed the microfilm copies of numerous TC titles Girodias possessed. He also got into serious trouble with Simon & Schuster and author Irving Wallace over a work called The Original Seven Minutes by J.J. Jadway. Copies of Girodias' Olympia Press title had to be destroyed before reaching the bookstores.

His books were published in the United States under the Olympia Press, Traveller's Companion and Ophelia Press imprints. After acquiring the Venus Library name from Kable News, who had taken it from Barney Rosset's Grove Press in settlement of debts, Girodias published also under the Venus Freeway imprint, with distribution being handled by Kable News.

His erotic and hardcore pornographic books were published also in the United Kingdom, in West Germany, Denmark and in The Netherlands under the Olympia Press imprint. The first British edition of Story of O by Pauline Réage was published by Olympia Press.

In 1974 Girodias published President Kissinger using the Venus Freeway imprint, a controversial work of science fiction by numerous authors offering a dream of socialism starring Secretary of State Henry Kissinger. Girodias, it is said, was set up by the authorities in a phony drug deal and invited to leave the country.

=== Civil ===
Girodias tended not to pay his writers, if he could avoid it, not to document his work, or even live up to his contracts. He was involved in litigation concerning Lolita, Candy, The Ginger Man, Stradella and O, among other works. In the cases of Candy and O, Girodias won, setting a great deal of copyright precedents. In the cases of Lolita and The Ginger Man, he lost.

== Death ==
On 3 July 1990, Girodias died of a heart attack. He was 71.
