= Fairytale of New York (disambiguation) =

"Fairytale of New York" is a 1987 song by The Pogues and Kirsty MacColl.

Fairytale of New York may also refer to:

- A Fairy Tale of New York, 1973 J. P. Donleavy novel
- Between Two Ferns: A Fairytale of New York, a 2012 television special
- "The Fairytale of New York", a nickname for tennis player Emma Raducanu's record-breaking run at the 2021 US Open
