= Edith Templeton =

Bohemian novelist

Edith Templeton (7 April 1916 in Prague, Austria-Hungary – 12 June 2006 in Bordighera, Italy) was a Bohemian novelist, who also wrote under the pseudonym Louise Walbrook.

== Life and career ==
Templeton was born Edith Passerová in Prague in 1916, to wealthy Bohemian parents. She spent the first four years of her life in Vienna, before moving back to what had become Czechoslovakia with her mother, to the home of her grandparents in Jirny. She was educated at the French Lycée in Prague, and left the city in 1938 to marry an English aeronautical engineer named Templeton. The marriage was violent and short-lived, and by 1946 she had settled in Bayswater, London, and was a captain in the British Army.

Her short stories began to appear in The New Yorker in the 1950s, starting in 1957, and were later published as a collection entitled The Darts of Cupid in 2002. Over the next several decades she published a number of novels as well as a travel book, The Surprise of Cremona. Edith Templeton left England in 1956 to live in India with her second husband, a cardiologist and the physician to the King of Nepal. Her novel Gordon was first published by Olympia Press in 1966 under the pseudonym Louise Walbrook. An autobiographical work based on Templeton's relationship with a Scottish psychiatrist, it was banned in England and Germany for indecency, and then grew in popularity and was pirated around the world, before eventually being republished under the author's real name in 2003.

She lived in various parts of Europe and made her final home in Bordighera, on the Italian Riviera. She died on 12 June 2006, aged 90.

== Works ==
=== Novels ===
- Summer in the Country (1950) (published in the U.S. as The Proper Bohemians)
- Living on Yesterday (1951)
- The Island of Desire (1952)
- This Charming Pastime (1955)
- Gordon (1966; republished under her real name in 2003)
- Murder in Estoril (1992)

=== Collection of stories ===
- The Darts of Cupid (2002)

=== Travel ===
- The Surprise of Cremona (Eyre & Spottiswoode 1954, Pallas Editions 2001 ISBN 1-873429-65-7)
