= James Campbell (author) =

Scottish writer (born 1951)

James Campbell FRSL
- Born: 1951 (age 74–75); Croftfoot, Glasgow, Scotland
- Education: University of Edinburgh (1974–78)
- Occupation: Writer
- Notable work: Talking at the Gates (1991); Exiled in Paris (1995); Just Go Down to the Road (2022)

James Campbell (born 1951) is a Scottish writer.

== Early life ==
James Campbell was born in Croftfoot, on the southside of Glasgow. He left school at the age of 15 to become an apprentice printer. After hitchhiking through Europe, Israel and North Africa, he studied to gain acceptance to the University of Edinburgh (1974–78).

== Career ==
On graduating, he immediately became editor of the New Edinburgh Review (1978–82). His first book, Invisible Country: A Journey Through Scotland, was published in 1984. Two years later, Campbell published Gate Fever, "based on a year's acquaintance with the prisoners and staff of Lewes Prison's C Wing".

Between 1991 and 1999, he wrote three books linked in theme: Talking at the Gates: A Life of James Baldwin, Paris Interzone: Richard Wright, Lolita, Boris Vian and Others on the Left Bank (published in the US as Exiled in Paris), and This Is the Beat Generation: New York, San Francisco, Paris. In 1993, Campbell's one-man play, The Midnight Hour, about a night in the life of James Baldwin, was staged at the Freedom Theatre, Philadelphia, with Reggie Montgomery in the role of Baldwin. A revised edition of Talking at the Gates, with a new introduction and an interview with Norman Mailer about Baldwin, was published in 2021.

For many years, Campbell worked for The Times Literary Supplement (TLS). Between 1998 and 2020, he wrote the weekly NB column on the back page of the TLS, under the pen-name "J.C.". A selection of the columns was published in 2023 under the title NB by J.C.: A Walk through the Times Literary Supplement. Reviewing the collection in The New York Times, Dwight Garner wrote: "one part of the TLS no one skips, in my experience, is the NB column . . . . He was interested in everything." The Herald's reviewer called Campbell "one of Scotland's finest under-recognised writers".

As a writer for The Guardian in the first decade of the present century, he wrote some fifty profiles of literary figures, including Ian Hamilton Finlay, Shirley Hazzard, Arthur Miller, Gary Snyder and John Updike. Campbell is also a writer for the New York Times Book Review.

Campbell was elected a Fellow of the Royal Society of Literature (FRSL) in 2026.

== Personal life ==
Campbell's Just Go Down to the Road: A Memoir of Trouble and Travel – described by Brian Morton in a TLS review as "more than a conventional memoir" – was published in Britain and the US in May 2022.

== Bibliography ==
- Invisible Country: A Journey Through Scotland (1984)
- Gate Fever: Voices from a Prison (1986)
- Talking at the Gates: A Life of James Baldwin (1991; revised and reissued 2021)
- Paris Interzone: Richard Wright, Lolita, Boris Vian and Others on the Left Bank (1994)
  - Exiled in Paris: Richard Wright, James Baldwin, Samuel Beckett and Others on the Left Bank (US edition of above title, 1995)
- The Picador Book of Blues and Jazz, editor (1995)
- This Is the Beat Generation: New York, San Francisco, Paris (1999)
- Thom Gunn in Conversation with James Campbell (2000)
- Syncopations: Beats, New Yorkers, and Writers in the Dark (2008)
- Just Go Down to the Road (2022)
- NB by J.C.: A walk through the Times Literary Supplement (2023)
