= The Bomb (Harris novel) =

1909 novel

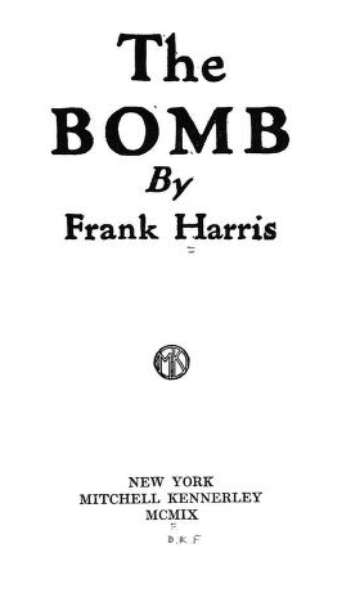
- Title page for The Bomb (1909)
- Author: Frank Harris
- Publisher: Kennerley
- Publication date: 1909

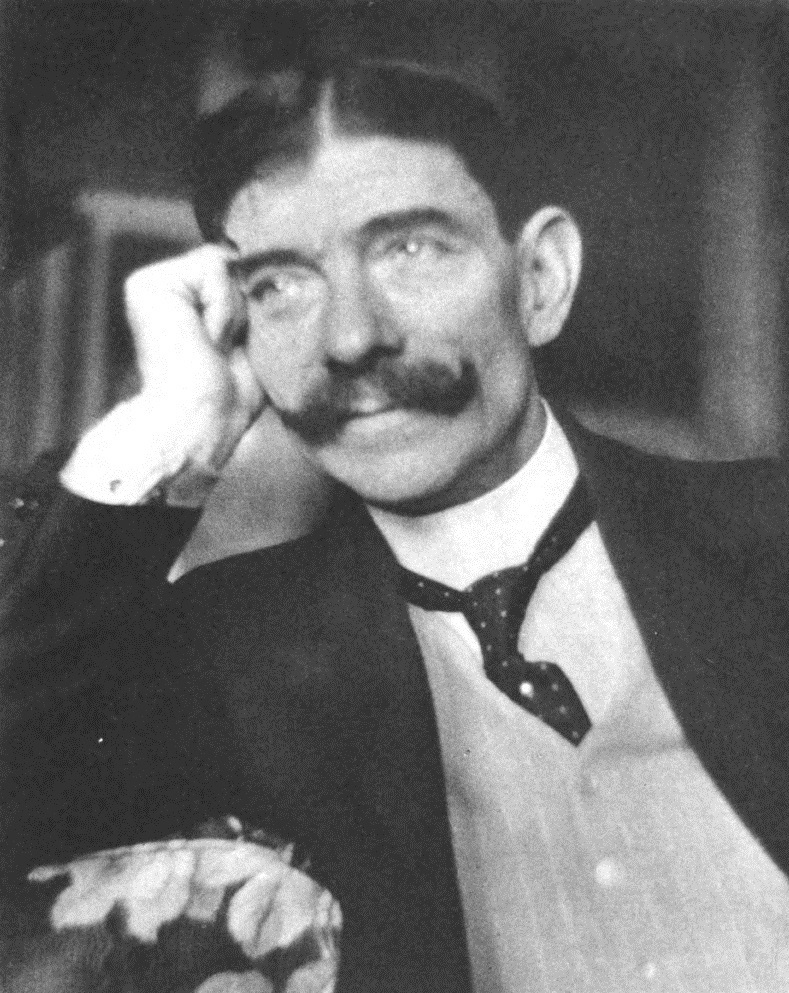
The author in 1913

The Bomb is a 1909 novel by Frank Harris based around the Haymarket affair.
