= The Hollow Men (disambiguation) =

The Hollow Men is a poem by T. S. Eliot.

The Hollow Men may also refer to:

- The Hollow Men (band), a British rock band
- The Hollow Men (book), book by Nicky Hager about New Zealand politics
- The Hollow Men (film), a documentary film directed by Alister Barry, based on the book by Nicky Hager about New Zealand politics
- The Hollow Men (comedy troupe), a British comedy troupe
- The Hollow Men (Doctor Who), a Doctor Who novel named after the poem
- "The Hollow Men" (Dollhouse), a 2010 episode of the Dollhouse TV series
- The Hollowmen, an Australian comedy series on ABC1

== See also ==
- The Hollow Man (disambiguation)
