= War Music (poem) =

Project of British poet Christopher Logue

War Music is the working title of British poet Christopher Logue's long-term project to create a modernist poem based on Homer's Iliad, begun in 1959. It was originally the name of the first volume of that project, uniting the separately completed Patrocleia (Book 16), GBH (Books 17/18) and Pax (Book 19), which was published in 1981. In 2001, the further sections Kings and The Husbands were added, covering Books 1–4. It was followed by two additional sections, All Day Permanent Red (2003) and Cold Calls, the latter of which won the 2005 Whitbread Poetry Award. These were founded on Books 5–9 and were collected with the former sections, still under the collective title War Music, in 2016. Also added to this volume was an appendix with Logue’s notes and drafts-in-progress for further episodes.

Logue's work created controversy among classicists since Logue did not know Ancient Greek and instead based his work on other translations of the Iliad and on a word-for-word crib provided by Classical scholar Donald Carne-Ross, who first proposed the project to Logue for the BBC. The new version was given a modernist, Imagist style and omits most of Homer's notable stylistic features for a looser structure. The plot and characters are altered in many minor points. Logue's performance is also distinguished by colloquialism and strikingly anachronistic images.

In June 2001, Verse Theater Manhattan (VTM) presented a two-man production of "Kings", adapted and directed by James Milton. In September 2001, VTM opened a production of "War Music" featuring a cast of three women and also adapted and directed by Mr. Milton. The production, in Greenwich Village, closed down because of the 9/11 attack but was revived and went on to play tours of both the Midwestern United States and the United Kingdom. American playwright Lillian Groag was commissioned by the American Conservatory Theater of San Francisco, California, to write a musical play based on the material. Groag directed and premiered the play, also called War Music, at the ACT in early 2009.

American composer Nathan Currier worked on a version of War Music for actors, baritone singer, and mixed ensemble, in collaboration with Christopher Logue, from 2003 until dementia overtook Logue in 2005. Originally commissioned for a premiere in Providence, Rhode Island, by a group called Aurea, with support from the Rhode Island Foundation, the premiere was to have taken place in September 2005 as part of a festival called FirstWorks, but disagreements with the ensemble led to its cancellation, and the work has not been premiered.
