= Merlin (literary magazine) =

Merlin was an avant-garde English-language literary magazine published in Paris. Seven issues were released between 1952 and 1954. It published the work of Samuel Beckett, Henry Miller, Christopher Logue, Pablo Neruda, and Jean-Paul Sartre, among others. Merlin's politically loaded literature and discomforting stories contributed to the publication's reputation as one of the most serious and experimental post-war English-language magazines.

Merlin was edited by Scottish expatriate Alexander Trocchi and published by Jane Lougee with the collaboration of Richard Seaver (later to become editor of Evergreen Review), Christopher Logue, George Plimpton (co-founder of The Paris Review), John Stevenson and Patrick Bowles. The magazine brought Beckett's recent work to the attention of English-language readers. In 1953, Maurice Girodias of Olympia Press collaborated on a new series called the "Collection Merlin."

Trocchi claimed that the journal came to an end when the United States Department of State canceled its many subscriptions in protest over an article by Jean-Paul Sartre.
