= Alexander Trocchi =

Scottish novelist (1925–1984)

Trocchi in 1967

Alexander Whitelaw Robertson Trocchi (/ˈtrɒki/ TROK-ee; 30 July 1925 – 15 April 1984) was a Scottish novelist.

== Early life and career ==
Trocchi was born in Glasgow to Alfred (formerly Alfredo) Trocchi, a music-hall performer of Italian parentage, and Annie (née Robertson), who ran a boarding house and died of food poisoning when Trocchi was a teenager. He attended Hillhead High School in the city and Cally House School in Gatehouse of Fleet, having been evacuated there during World War II. After working as a seaman on the Murmansk convoys, he studied English Literature and Moral Philosophy at the University of Glasgow, and was awarded second-class honours in 1950.

Without graduating, Trocchi obtained a travelling grant that enabled him to relocate to continental Europe. In the early 1950s he lived in Paris and edited the literary magazine Merlin, which published Henry Miller, Samuel Beckett, Christopher Logue, and Pablo Neruda, amongst others. Although not published in Merlin, American writer Terry Southern, who lived in Paris from 1948 to 1952, became a close friend of both Trocchi and his colleague Richard Seaver, and the three later co-edited the anthology Writers In Revolt (1962). Though Merlin had been established somewhat in rivalry with the Paris Review, George Plimpton also had served on the magazine's editorial board. Trocchi claimed that this journal came to an end when the US State Department cancelled its many subscriptions in protest over an article by Jean-Paul Sartre praising the homoeroticism of Jean Genet.

Maurice Girodias published most of Trocchi's novels through Olympia Press, often written under pen names, such as Frances Lengel and Carmencita de las Lunas. Girodias also published My Life and Loves: Fifth Volume, which purported to be the final volume of the autobiography of Irish-American writer Frank Harris. However, though based on autobiographical material by Harris, the book was heavily edited and rewritten by Trocchi. Girodias subsequently commissioned Trocchi to write erotica along with his friends and Merlin associates Logue, Plimpton and John Stevenson. Under the name Frances Lengel, he churned out numerous pornographic books including the now classic Helen and Desire (1954) and a dirty version of his own book Young Adam (1954). Trocchi and his friends also published Samuel Beckett's War and Memory and Jean Genet's Thief's journal in English for the first time.

== Drug addiction ==
Trocchi acquired his lifelong heroin addiction in Paris. He left Paris for the United States and spent time in Taos, New Mexico, before settling in New York City, where he worked on a stone scow on the Hudson River. This time is chronicled in the novel Cain's Book, which at the time became something of a sensation, being an honest study of heroin addiction with descriptions of sex and drug use that got it banned in Britain, where the book was the subject of an obscenity trial. In the United States, however, it received favorable reviews.

Trocchi was then deep in the throes of heroin addiction; he even failed to attend his own launch party for Cain's Book. His wife Lyn prostituted herself on the streets of the Lower East Side. He injected himself on camera during a live television debate on drug abuse, despite being on bail at the time. He had been charged with supplying heroin to a minor, an offence then punishable by death. A jail term seemed certain, but with the help of friends (including Norman Mailer), Trocchi was smuggled over the Canada–US border where he was given refuge in Montreal by poet Irving Layton and met up with Leonard Cohen. His wife Lyn was arrested and son Marc detained, but later joined Trocchi in London.

== Later life ==
In the late 1950s he lived in Venice, California, then the centre of the Southern California Beat scene. In October 1955, he became involved with the Lettrist International and then the Situationist International. His text "Invisible Insurrection of a Million Minds" was published in the Scottish journal New Saltire in 1962 and subsequently as "Technique du Coup du Monde" in Internationale Situationniste, number 8. It proposed an international "spontaneous university" as a cultural force and marked the beginning of his movement towards his sigma project, which played a formative part in the UK Underground.

Trocchi appeared at the 1962 Edinburgh Writers Festival where he claimed "sodomy" as a basis for his writing. During the festival, Hugh MacDiarmid denounced him as "cosmopolitan scum". However, while this incident is well known, it is little remarked upon that the two men subsequently engaged in correspondence, and actually became friends. Trocchi then moved to London, where he remained for the rest of his life.

He began a new novel, The Long Book, which he did not finish. Much of his sporadic work of the 1960s was collected as The Sigma Portfolio. In March 1966 the Internationale Situationniste, issue number 10, announced "Upon the appearance in London of the first publications of the 'Project Sigma' initiated by Alexander Trocchi, it was mutually agreed that the SI could not involve itself in such a loose cultural venture... It is therefore no longer as a member of the SI that our friend Alexander Trocchi has since developed an activity of which we fully approve of several aspects." He continued writing but published little. He opened a small book store near his Kensington home. He was known in Notting Hill as "Scots Alec".

In the 1960s and '70s, Trocchi lived at 4 Observatory Gardens, Kensington, London on the two top floors of a 19th-century terrace block comprising six storeys. He had two sons: Marc Alexander and Nicholas. The elder son, Marc died of cancer at age 19 in 1976, shortly after Alexander's American wife Lyn died of complications from hepatitis.

After undergoing surgery for lung cancer, he died of pneumonia in London on 15 April 1984. He was cremated at Mortlake Crematorium.

The younger son, Nicholas, returned to the family's home in London less than a year after his father's death and leapt to his death from the top floor of the five-storey building. When the terrace block was extensively refurbished into luxury apartments in the 1980s, the number on Alexander Trocchi's house was removed.

== Resurgence ==
Interest in Trocchi and his role in the avant-garde movements of the mid-20th century began to rise soon after his death. Edinburgh Review published a "Trocchi Number" in 1985 and their parent house, Polygon, published the biography, The Making of the Monster in 1991 by Andrew Murray Scott simultaneously with an anthology, Invisible Insurrection, also compiled by Scott who had known Trocchi for four years in London. These works were influential in bringing Trocchi back to public attention and were widely reviewed. Scott assisted the Estate in attempting to regain control of Trocchi's material and to license new editions in the UK and US and Far East, also collating and annotating all remaining manuscripts and documents in the Estate's possession.

During the 1990s, various American and Scottish publishers (most notably Rebel Inc.) reissued his originally pseudonymous Olympia Press novels and a retrospective of his articles for Merlin and others, A Life in Pieces (1997), was issued in response to revived interest in his life and work by a younger generation. His early novel Young Adam was adapted into a film starring Ewan McGregor and Tilda Swinton in 2003 after several years of wrangling over finance.

Tainted Love (2005) by Stewart Home contains a lengthy 'factional' meditation on Trocchi's post-literary career period in Notting Hill. In 2009 Oneworld Publications reissued Man at Leisure (1972), complete with the original introduction by William Burroughs, and in 2011 Oneworld Publications also re-released Cain's Book, with a foreword by Tom McCarthy.

== Bibliography ==
=== Novels ===
- Helen and Desire (as Frances Lengel), The Olympia Press, Paris, 1954.
- The Carnal Days of Helen Seferis (as Frances Lengel), The Olympia Press, Paris, 1954.
- Young Adam (as Frances Lengel), The Olympia Press, Paris, 1954.
- My Life and Loves: Fifth Volume, The Olympia Press, Paris, 1954.
- White Thighs (as Frances Lengel), The Olympia Press, Paris, 1955.
- School for Sin (as Frances Lengel), The Olympia Press, Paris, 1955.
- Thongs (as Carmencita de las Lunas), The Olympia Press, Paris, 1956.
- Sappho of Lesbos, Castle Books, New York, 1960.
- Cain's Book, John Calder, London, 1960.
- School For Wives, 1967.

=== Poetry ===
- Man at Leisure, John Calder, London, 1972.

=== Short fiction ===
- The Holy Man and Other Stories, Calder Publications, London, 2019.

=== Collections ===
- Scott, Andrew Murray, editor. Invisible Insurrection of a Million Minds: A Trocchi Reader, (1991, Reprint 1996)
- Seaver, Richard, Terry Southern and Alexander Trocchi (eds). Writers in Revolt: An Anthology (1962)

=== Biographies ===
- Scott, Andrew Murray. Alexander Trocchi: The Making of the Monster (hb, Polygon, 1991) 2nd revised and extended Edition published in 2012 (Kennedy & Boyd)
- Bowd, Gavin. The Outsiders: Alexander Trocchi and Kenneth White (1998)
- Campbell, Allan, and Tim Niel (eds.). A Life in Pieces: Reflections on Alexander Trocchi (1997)
- Slater, Howard. "Alexander Trocchi and Project Sigma" (1989)

=== About Merlin and Paris ===
- Campbell, James. Exiled in Paris: Richard Wright, Lolita, Boris Vian and others on the Left Bank (1994)
- Scott, Andrew Murray. Trocchi and MacDiarmid, Where Extremists Meet, Chapman magazine, no. 83, 2003.
- Hill, Lee. A Grand Guy: The Life and Art of Terry Southern, (Bloomsbury, 2001)
