= The White Rose (play) =

The White Rose was written by Lillian Garrett-Groag and premiered in 1991 at the Old Globe Theatre in San Diego, Calif. The play chronicles the arrest, interrogation and eventual execution of a group of students at the University of Munich (now LMU Munich) who protested against the Nazi regime at the height of World War II. The students assigned to themselves the name White Rose.

"The play has roles for seven males and one female. The strongest roles belong to Robert Mohr, the head of the Munich Gestapo, and Sophie Scholl, one of the students. Mohr, moved by Scholl's passion (and mindful that she is German, but not Jewish), attempts to save her by giving her a chance to recant, but she refuses. The play ends with a spotlight on Scholl snapping off, symbolizing her beheading, and Mohr musing, "The most we can hope for is to get by. Heroes and ... (carefully) demagogues will always shake things up for a while, but if we're clever, we'll still be here when they're gone." At which point, a Gestapo investigator attempts to be encouraging, noting that people like Mohr "are of enormous use to the Reich." Thus concludes the theme of the play, that people, not monsters, are responsible for great communal disasters, and each of those people had a "moment of choice," according to Garrett-Groag in her Foreword.

The White Rose won the AT&T Award for New American Plays.

== Proposed film adaptation ==
On January 24, 1991, Bruce Kerner was interested in producing the film adaptation of The White Rose back in 1989 with Inge Scholl consulting on the film and production expected to start later in 1991 or in 1992.

== Stage productions ==
In 2013, a professional production of The White Rose took place in Vaughan, Ontario, Canada (part of the Greater Toronto Area) at the Vaughan City Playhouse. Produced by Shadowpath Productions, it was directed by Tanisha Taitt and featured Alex Karolyi as Sophie Scholl.

== Broadway production ==
On January 24, 1991, Bruce Kerner expressed interest in producing a Broadway production of The White Rose as well.
