= The Beastly Beatitudes of Balthazar B =

Novel by J. P. Donleavy

First edition

The Beastly Beatitudes of Balthazar B is the third full-length novel by Irish American writer J. P. Donleavy and follows the picaresque experiences of the eponymous character from his birth into his mid-twenties. The book was published in the US by Delacorte Press in 1968 and the following year in Britain by Eyre and Spottiswoode. Although it was favourably reviewed at the time, it was also criticized for its regressive dependence on the same subject matter as in The Ginger Man.

== Plot ==
Balthazar B (whose final name is never revealed) is born to riches in Paris. His father dies when he is young and his mother neglects him for her lovers. Instead he is brought up by a nanny and relies for male advice on his Uncle Edouard, who instructs him in the worldly life of an elegant roué. He is shipped off to a British boarding school, where he makes a lasting friendship with Beefy, a similarly displaced laird, who is eventually expelled. On a return to Paris at the age of twelve Balthazar is initiated sexually by his 24-year-old nanny, Bella Hortense. She is dismissed when the brief idyll is discovered and it is only later that he discovers that she had a child by him.

World War II breaks out while Balthazar is in England, so he enrolls for his university education at Trinity College, Dublin. There he encounters Beefy again, who is preparing for holy orders in the Church of Ireland. One lusty adventure too many puts paid to Beefy's episcopal aspirations and he is sent down along with Balthazar, whom he has involved. But Balthazar, who is shy and has had to be courted by all the women he encounters, has taken the fancy of the wealthy Elizabeth Fitzdare from County Fermanagh, to whom he becomes engaged. After he returns to England, arrangements are called off and, again, only much later does he learn that she had had a riding accident from which she eventually died.

After Beefy and Balthazar meet up again in London, Beefy's allowance is stopped and he plans to recoup his fortunes by making a rich marriage. Balthazar is trapped into a soulless, upper middle-class marriage by Millicent, a scheming friend of Beefy's fiancée (‘the Violet Infanta’) who is only interested in Balthazar's money. Beefy only discovers after his own marriage that this was also the Violet Infanta's interest in him, she turning out to be penniless. But while their marriage is happy, Millicent leaves Balthazar on discovering his enduring love for Elizabeth Fitzdare, taking their son with her. At the end, having paid a visit to Elizabeth's grave to make his farewell, Balthazar is called back to Paris for his mother's funeral.

== Reception ==
Early reviews appreciated the novel's comic set pieces, its "humor that stops just short of poetry", and John Leonard described Donleavy as "a comic writer rivaling Waugh and Wodehouse". The New York Times commented that "the prep school passages are wonderful, followed by one of the most perfect love affairs in modern literature. This romp of a novel is lush and lovely, bawdy and sad." But despite the humour, the reviewer in Time commented that "the overall tone of the book is tragic and almost elegiac".

Donleavy's trademark writing is described as "an intricate prose style characterized by minimal punctuation, strings of sentence fragments, frequent shifts of tense, and lapses from standard third-person narration into first-person stream of consciousness," and was particularly appreciated. However, in terms of the plotting, there was not a lot that was new. John Deedy, writing in Commonweal, praised the first hundred pages (of the book's 400) but then found the Trinity College episodes "warmed-over Ginger Man", only excepting the Fitzdare romance; everything after her disappearance struck him as disappointing. Similarly, in his article in Life, John Leonard had already asked "how many novels must [Donleavy] write about Trinity College before he graduates?"

Eventually the novel was adapted for the stage by Donleavy himself and ran in 1981–82 at the Duke of York's Theatre, London, and then in the US in 1985. In 2012, when the novel was being considered for filming, it was reported at that date to have been translated into over twenty languages.
