= The Unexpurgated Code =

Book by J.P. Donleavy

- First edition
- Author: J. P. Donleavy
- Language: English
- Genre: Non-fiction
- Publisher: Delacorte Press
- Publication date: 1975
- Publication place: United States

The Unexpurgated Code: A Complete Manual of Survival & Manners is a 1975 non-fiction humorous book by J. P. Donleavy.

== Overview ==
The book is posed as an irreverent, tongue-in-cheek guide for social climbers, containing humorous guidelines for managing every possible contingency in high society.

Chapters:

1. Social Climbing
2. Extinctions and Mortalities
3. Vilenesses Various
4. In Pursuit of Comfortable Habits
5. Perils and Precautions

== Advice ==
The book consists of hundreds of anecdotes and events one may encounter throughout life, and how to deal with them. Some examples include:

- Upon Embellishing your Background
- Accent Improvement
- Upon the Sudden Reawakening of your Sordid Background
- Ass kissing and other types of Flattery
- Suicide
- Cannibalism
- Upon Saucy Assemblages
- Upon Marrying a Lady for Her Money
- Stripping and Streaking
- When the Overwhelming Desire to Goose a Lady Cannot be Suppressed
- Upon Being a Member of the Titled Classes
- Blowing upon Your Soup
- Wife Beating
- Shabby People
- Shabby Shabby People
- Shabby Shabby Shabby People

== Quotations ==
Shaving: "Hey why are you growing that beard."..."I say, you unpleasantly unfortunate radoteur, I'm not doing a thing. You're shaving every day."

When Some Supercilious Cunt Asks Is There Anything Wrong: "Yes, you evil little man, I'm looking at your tie."

How to Prevent People from Detesting You: "Don't try."

The Psychologist: "This smug son of a bitch."

== Reception ==
Several critics noted that the book is a very humorous read, and that it points out many of the aspects of human behaviour as exhibited by the wealthy and famous individuals it describes. In a 1975 review for The Herald-Sun, Robert Salisbury calls it “The best work of its kind since Flaubert’s Dictionary of Received Ideas”, and a small experimental aside from [Donleavy's] novelistic chores that is enjoyable in form and conten”, but notes a desire for Donleavy to return to writing novels, citing The Ginger Man, possibly Donleavy's most well-recognized work.

Bill Erdman, writing for The World of Coos Bay, Oregon notes that the book is humorous,and that “the advice Donleavy provides seems both ludicrous and accurate", concluding with “The Unexpurgated Code is best read alone. "When others are around, you might be required to explain why you’re laughing out loud…”

An April 7, 2025, review by Dwight Garner in The New York Times was published around the book's 50th anniversary, calling it “…possibly, the funniest book ever written”.
