= The Hollow Man (Harris novel) =

2011 novel by Oliver Harris

- First edition
- Author: Oliver Harris
- Language: English
- Genre: Crime
- Publisher: Jonathan Cape
- Publication date: 2011
- Publication place: United Kingdom
- Pages: 384 (paperback)

The Hollow Man (2011) is a novel by British author Oliver Harris, the first of a series featuring detective Nick Belsey.
