= Grove Press =

American publishing house

- Parent company: Grove/Atlantic
- Founded: 1949; 77 years ago
- Country of origin: United States
- Headquarters location: New York City, New York
- Distribution: Publishers Group West
- Publication types: Books
- Imprints: Black Cat
- Official website: groveatlantic.com

Grove Press is an American publishing imprint that was founded in 1949 by John Balcomb and Robert Phelps. Imprints include: Black Cat, Evergreen, Venus Library, and Zebra. Barney Rosset purchased the company in 1951 and turned it into an alternative book press in the United States. He partnered with Richard Seaver to bring French literature to the United States. The Atlantic Monthly Press, under the aegis of its publisher, Morgan Entrekin, merged with Grove Press in 1993. Grove later became an imprint of the publisher Grove/Atlantic, Inc.

== Early years ==
Grove Press was founded in 1949 by John Balcomb and Robert Phelps in Greenwich Village, Manhattan, on Grove Street. They published Selected Writings of the Ingenious Mrs. Aphra Behn in 1950, edited by Phelps. Phelps sold Grove Press to Barney Rosset in 1951 for three thousand dollars.

== Literary avant-garde ==
Under Rosset's leadership, Grove introduced American readers to European avant-garde literature and theatre, including French authors Alain Robbe-Grillet, Jean Genet, and Eugène Ionesco.

In 1954, Grove published Samuel Beckett's play Waiting for Godot after it had been refused by more mainstream publishers. Since then Grove has been Beckett's U.S. publisher. Grove is also the U.S. publisher of the works of Harold Pinter; in 2006, the company published a collection called The Essential Pinter, which includes Pinter's Nobel Lecture, entitled "Art, Truth and Politics". In 2006, Grove published an anniversary bilingual edition of Waiting for Godot and a special four-volume edition of Beckett's works, with commissioned introductions by Edward Albee, J. M. Coetzee, Salman Rushdie, and Colm Tóibín, to commemorate the centenary of his birth in April 1906). Grove was the first American house to publish the unabridged complete works of the Marquis de Sade, translated by Seaver and Austryn Wainhouse. Grove also had an interest in Japanese literature, publishing several anthologies as well as works by Kenzaburō Ōe and others.

Grove published most of the American Beats of the 1950s (Jack Kerouac, William Burroughs, and Allen Ginsberg), in addition to such poets as Frank O'Hara of the New York School and poets associated with Black Mountain and the San Francisco Renaissance, including Robert Duncan. In 1963, Grove published My Life and Loves: Five Volumes in One/Complete and Unexpurgated, with annotations, collecting Frank Harris' work in one volume for the first time.

From 1957 to 1973 Grove published Evergreen Review, a literary magazine whose contributors included Edward Albee, Bertolt Brecht, William S. Burroughs, Albert Camus, Lawrence Ferlinghetti, Nat Hentoff, LeRoi Jones, John Lahr, and Timothy Leary.

Grove has also from time to time published mainstream works. For example, in 1978 it published the script from the George Lucas film American Graffiti under its Black Cat paperback imprint.

In 1956, Rosset hired Fred Jordan as Grove's business manager. Jordan spent most of the next 30 years at Grove. Later an editor with the press, Jordan oversaw the company's First Amendment lawsuits.

== Political works ==
The defining movements of the 1960s in America—the antiwar, civil rights, black power, counterculture, and student movements in the United States—along with revolutions across the globe, were debated, exposed, and discussed in Grove's publications, as was the sexual revolution. Grove's books challenged prevailing attitudes about sex through dozens of erotic books, many by "anonymous" authors; introduced the layperson to new directions in psychology through Eric Berne's Games People Play (1964); and gave voice to revolutionaries around the world, among them Che Guevara and Malcolm X. Grove published works by Frantz Fanon and Régis Debray, and numerous books opposing the Vietnam War and the draft, including information on G.I. rights.

== Censorship and obscenity battles ==
Rejecting conventional notions of obscenity and morality, Grove gained a reputation as a controversial publisher committed to fighting censorship as it published some of the best-known banned books.

In 1959, Grove Press published an unexpurgated version of D. H. Lawrence's Lady Chatterley's Lover. The U.S. Post Office Department confiscated copies sent through the mail. Rosset sued the New York city postmaster and his lawyer Charles Rembar won in New York, and then on federal appeal.

Grove's success in publishing Lady Chatterley's Lover paved the way for Rosset to publish another contested work that was ultimately cleared by the courts, Henry Miller's 1934 novel, Tropic of Cancer. The book contained explicit sexual passages and therefore could not be published in the United States. In 1961, Grove Press issued a copy of the work and lawsuits were brought against dozens of individual booksellers in many states for selling it. The issue was ultimately settled by the U. S. Supreme Court's 1973 decision in Miller v. California. (The Miller of the Miller case was unrelated to Henry Miller.)

The William S. Burroughs novel Naked Lunch was banned in some parts of the world for approximately ten years. Its first American publisher was Grove Press. The book was banned by Boston courts in 1962 on the grounds of obscenity, but that decision was reversed in a landmark 1966 opinion by the Supreme Judicial Court of Massachusetts. This was the last major literary censorship battle in the US. Upon publication, Grove Press added to the book supplementary material regarding the censorship battle as well as an article written by Burroughs on the topic of drug addiction. Grove would publish several editions of the novel over the next four decades, including a "Restored Text" version in 2002. Grove also published the first American paperback editions of other Burroughs works, including The Soft Machine, Nova Express and The Ticket That Exploded. Grove would also publish the final collection of the author's writings, the posthumously published Last Words: The Final Journals of William S. Burroughs, and in 2008 published the American first edition of And the Hippos Were Boiled in Their Tanks, the first release of a novel that Burroughs and Jack Kerouac had collaborated on in the mid-1940s.

Grove had to defend its Evergreen Review on several occasions due to what was deemed objectionable content. Issues were occasionally seized by the authorities.

After winning several battles over the printed page, Grove built on these victories and successfully defended the screening of Vilgot Sjöman's Swedish film I Am Curious (Yellow).

== Film ==
Grove Press acquired Cinema 16 in 1966. In 1970, they sponsored the Grove Press International Film Festival in New York City. The film division was closed in 1985.

== Union conflicts ==
In 1962, Grove had sales of $2 million, but after legal bills, lost $400,000. By 1964, however, they were profitable, and by 1967, Grove went public and built its own headquarters. In 1970, the staff of 150 began organizing a union. Rosset fired some of the organizers (and later re-hired them in arbitration). The organizers responded with a picket line and an occupation of the building. Rosset called the police, and the occupiers were arrested. His editor, Richard Seaver, talked to the pickets and convinced them to disperse. Grove distributed an anti-union information sheet, and the union vote failed, 86–34. After the vote, Grove fired half its workers.

== 1980s ==
In 1985, Rosset sold Grove Press to Ann Getty and Sir George Weidenfeld, a British publisher. Rosset was fired a year later.

== Notable authors ==
- Kathy Acker
- Samuel Beckett
- Jorge Luis Borges
- William S. Burroughs
- Frantz Fanon
- Eugene Ionesco
- Ismail Kadare
- Henry Miller
- Jean Genet
- Marguerite Duras
- Octavio Paz
- Hubert Selby Jr.
- Kenzaburō Ōe
- Jack Kerouac
- Allen Ginsberg

== In film ==
Obscene, a documentary feature about Rosset and Grove Press by Neil Ortenberg and Daniel O'Connor, was released September 26, 2008. The film was a selection of the 2007 Toronto International Film Festival. Featured in the film are Amiri Baraka, Lenny Bruce, William S. Burroughs, Jim Carroll, Lawrence Ferlinghetti, Allen Ginsberg, Al Goldstein, Erica Jong, Ray Manzarek, Michael McClure, Henry Miller, John Rechy, Ed Sanders, Floyd Salas, John Sayles, Gore Vidal, John Waters, and Malcolm X.

== In popular culture ==
Grove Press is referenced several times in the AMC series Mad Men, directly or indirectly. In Season 1, Episode 3, Joan Holloway returns a borrowed copy of D. H. Lawrence's Lady Chatterley's Lover; the book's first U.S. publisher was Grove Press, which fought numerous court battles over it. Season 2, Episode 13 is titled "Meditations in an Emergency", after a book of poetry by Frank O'Hara published by Grove Press in 1957; later in the episode, Don Draper is seen reading the book, after being challenged by a colleague ("You wouldn't like it."). The episode reportedly boosted sales of the book by 218%. Season 4, Episode 11 features Eric Berne's Games People Play, another best-seller published by Grove Press. In Season 5, Episode 9, Don is seen at the theater holding an issue of Evergreen Showcard, Grove's short-lived off-Broadway theatrical magazine. In Season 7, Episode 6, Don mentions to Peggy that he and Megan had seen the film I Am Curious (Yellow) the previous evening (Don: "[I'm] still scandalized." Peggy: "Of course Megan would want to see a dirty movie."); the 1967 film's U.S. distributor was Grove Press.

In addition to the references in the show, in 2010, the real Grove/Atlantic (the successor company to Grove Press) published the memoir of fictional Roger Sterling: Sterling's Gold: Wit and Wisdom of an Ad Man. In Younger (TV series), Zane is referenced as being the new publisher for Grove in Season 7.

== Book series ==
- Evergreen Black Cat Books
- Evergreen Books
- Evergreen Profile Books
- Venus Library
- Zebra Books

== Novels ==
- Gold by the Inch (1998)
