= John Stevenson (writer) =

British writer (1930–2017)

John "Steve" Stevenson
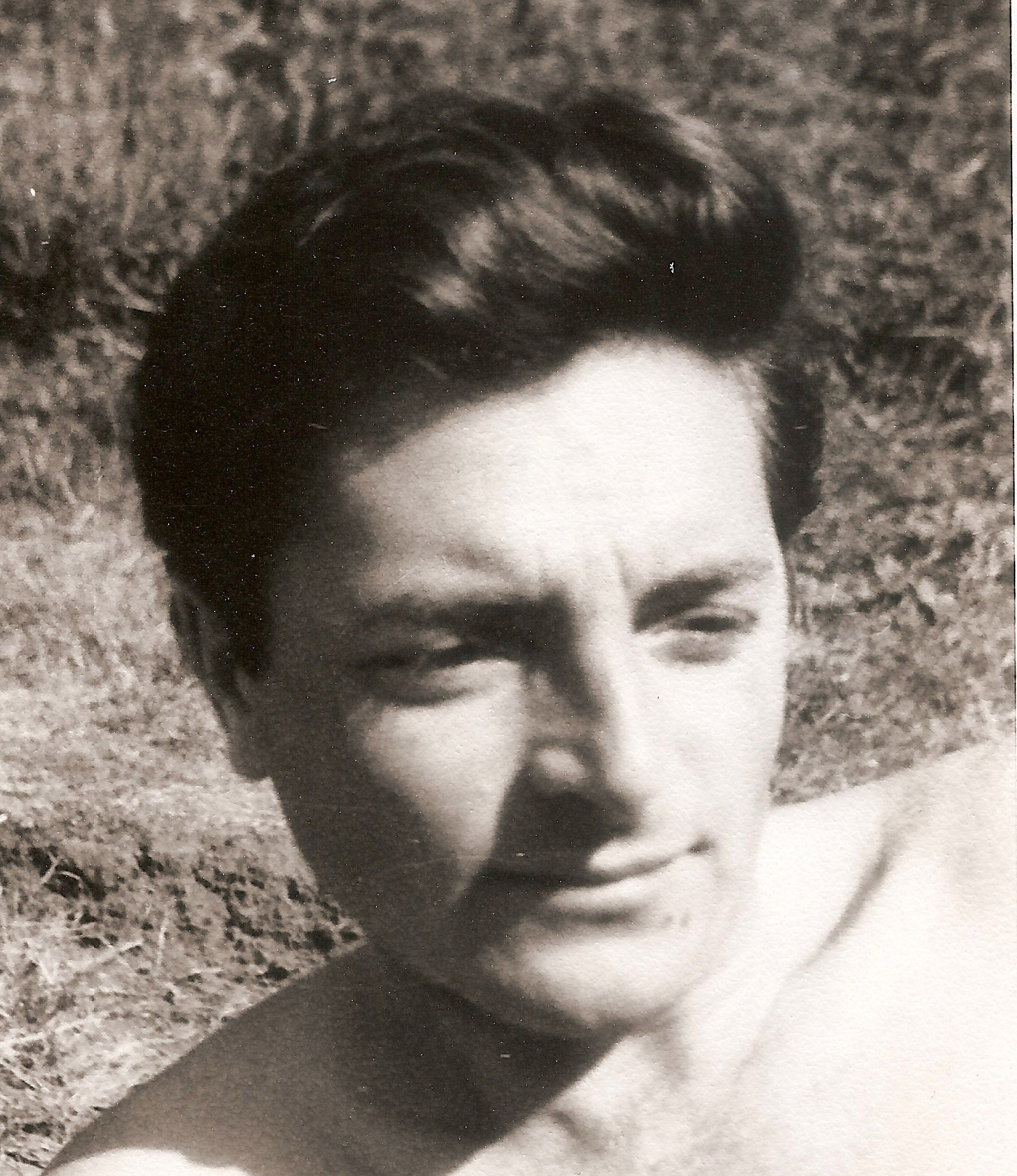
- John Stevenson (1968)
- Born: 10 July 1930
- Died: 27 November 2017 (aged 87)
- Other names: Marcus van Heller, Stephen John
- Occupations: Novelist, COI press officer
- Notable work: Traveller's Companion
- Children: 2, including James Stevenson

John "Steve" Stevenson (10 July 1930 – 27 November 2017) was a British writer who, under the pen name Marcus van Heller, wrote erotic fiction for the Traveller's Companion series of Olympia Press publisher (1955–1961). Later he also wrote under the pen name Stephen John.

== Career ==
In 1954, at the age of 23, John Stevenson arrived for a sojourn in Paris, where he socialized with the expatriate community behind the modernist literary magazine Merlin. He soon became the business manager for Merlin. As the magazine was not well known to the public, the job consisted mostly of selling copies on the street.

=== Marcus van Heller pen name ===
The main editor of Merlin, Alexander Trocchi, used to write erotic fiction for Olympia Press publisher to supplement his meagre income and suggested to Stevenson to do the same. Olympia Press specialised in books which could not be published (without legal action) in the English-speaking world, making use of the fact that the French were more sexually tolerant and few were able to read in English. The books were aimed at the English-speaking travellers and the British and American servicemen stationed in Europe in the wake of the Second World War.

The first erotic novel written by John Stevenson, Rape (1955), surprised Maurice Girodias (the founder of Olympia Press), who described it as "almost too brutal". The book was published under the pseudonym Marcus van Heller, a pen name which Stevenson continued to use for the subsequent novels, making it one of the most famous brand names published at Olympia Press. The success of the first novel was followed by other books, written in the years 1955–1961, making Stevenson the most prolific writer for the "Traveller's Companion" series of this publisher.

The second novel, The Loins of Amon (1955), was set in Ancient Egypt, marking the beginning of a specialisation in erotica with grand historical settings. The elaboration of the story was based on his schooling in ancient history, supplemented by research at the British Council Library from Paris. Continuing in the same vein, Roman Orgy (1956) presented an intimate account of the private life of the rebel leader Spartacus, and The House of Borgia, parts 1 and 2 (1957, 1958), a fictional biography of the 15th century Italian noble family with an emphasis on their considerable depravity.

The novels The Wantons (1957), Terror (1958) and Nightmare (1960) have a contemporary setting of social discontent, while Cruel Lips (1956), Kidnap (1961) and Adam and Eve (1961) are thrillers.

In a few years, Marcus van Heller became the most prolific and mysterious pen name from the "Traveller's Companion" series. "In the netherworld of erotica, the name Marcus van Heller approaches the stature of legend" (portrayal by John de St. Jorre in his book about the history of Olympia Press).

At one point, John Stevenson and Alexander Trocchi found out that Maurice Girodias reprinted their works under another imprint, Ophelia Press, to avoid giving them more money. This fact and also a negative remark from Girodias regarding the effort he put into writing his most recent novel determined Stevenson to end the collaboration with Olympia Press and return to Britain in 1961. Afterwards, Girodias used the fact that the real identity behind the pen name Marcus van Haller was largely unknown, commissioning other writers to publish new novels under this pen name.

In a 2003 interview, John Stevenson mentioned that the career turn in the years 1955–1961 was unexpected by him. He was far from having a Bohemian lifestyle and his only previous experience of writing consisted in a few features for West Country magazines. He usually kept his real identity separate from this work (his parents never knew anything about it). The unexpected factor was also reflected in the fact that he did not know how to negotiate proper contracts, earning only the lump sum agreed for the first edition and losing any subsequent royalties.

=== Later career ===
After returning to Britain, John Stevenson became a civil servant, working as the press officer for the Central Office of Information. He ghostwrote a biography of Michael X, From Michael de Freitas to Michael X, published in 1968. In 1969 under the name John X. Under the pen name Stephen John, he began publishing new novels at Berkley Books. I Like It That Way (1969) started a series of seven erotic novels, published in the years 1969–1976 and based on a fictional art dealer named Albert Divine.

== Personal life and death ==
Stevenson had two sons, James and David. The eldest is the punk/alternative rock guitarist James Stevenson. As an avid Karate enthusiast, he became a black belt at the age of 66.

John Stevenson died on 27 November 2017, at the age of 87.

== Works ==
Novels written under the pen name Marcus van Heller, published by Olympia Press:

- Rape (1955)
- The Loins of Amun (1955)
- With Open Mouth (1955)
- Cruel Lips (1956)
- Roman Orgy (1956)
- The Wantons (1957)
- The House of Borgia (1957)
- The House of Borgia, part 2 (1958)
- Terror (1958)
- Nightmare (1960)
- Kidnap (1961)
- Adam and Eve (1961)

Ghostwritten:

- From Michael de Freitas to Michael X (1968)

Novels written under the pen name Stephen John, published by Berkley Books:

- I Like It That Way (1969)
- How about this Way? (1970)
- Any Way You Like it (1972)
- This Way, Please! (1973)
- Coming My Way? (1974)
- Have It Your Way (1975)
- What a Way to Go! (1976)
