= The Ginger Man =

1955 novel by J. P. Donleavy

- The first edition of The Ginger Man, 1955
- Author: J. P. Donleavy
- Language: English
- Subject: Comedy
- Genre: Modern literature, picaresque novel
- Set in: Post-war Dublin
- Published: 1955; 71 years ago
- Publisher: Neville Spearman, Olympia Press
- Publication place: France
- Pages: 347
- ISBN: 978-0-802-14466-9

The Ginger Man is a picaresque novel by American-Irish writer J. P. Donleavy, first published in Paris in 1955. The story is set in Dublin, Ireland, in post-war 1947. Originally banned for obscenity, the book has since become a major commercial success, selling almost 50 million copies worldwide. It is one of the best-selling books of all time, and in 1998, it was ranked 99th by the Modern Library in its list of the "100 Best Novels of the 20th Century." The novel has been translated into over 30 languages and is considered a cult classic of 20th-century literature. Donleavy wrote a stage adaptation, The Ginger Man: A Play, which opened in London in 1959. The book is widely considered a classic of modern literature, and remains a popular novel.

== Plot summary ==
The story follows the life of a young American student named Sebastian Dangerfield, who arrives in Ireland after the Second World War. He enrolls at Trinity College Dublin, and the book chronicles Dangerfield's drunken, sexual and occasionally violent misadventures, including his troubled relationship with his English wife and daughter.

== Background ==
Donleavy's friend and fellow writer Brendan Behan was the first person to read the completed manuscript. The book was rejected by numerous publishers, but The Manchester Guardian published some extracts from it, calling the book a "comic triumph". Subsequently, Behan told Donleavy about Olympia Press, a Paris-based English-language publisher that had produced works by Samuel Beckett, and Donleavy succeeded in getting the book published by them, but was angered when he discovered that it had done so under its pornography imprint.

In his 1994 autobiography The History of The Ginger Man, Donleavy wrote, "I smashed my fist upon its green cover format, published as it was in the pseudonymous and pornographic Traveller's Companion Series, and I declared aloud, 'If it's the last thing I ever do, I will avenge this book.'" Donleavy and the owner of Olympia Press, Maurice Girodias, became embroiled in decades of legal cases, The Guardian noting: "Twenty years later, the two parties were still suing each other, under the guise of phantom companies – Donleavy was 'The Little Someone Corporation' – with no end in sight. Girodias had declared himself bankrupt, and was preparing to buy back the title of his beloved Olympia Press at an auction in Paris. Donleavy learned of the sale and sent his wife to France with a large sum in cash. When bidding went over $8,000, Girodias ran out of money. The mysterious woman (as Girodias saw her) made a final bid, and the Olympia Press belonged to Donleavy."

== Reception ==
Upon its publication, it was initially banned both in Ireland and the United States of America by reason of obscenity.

The Ginger Man has sold 45 million copies worldwide and has never been out of print. It was named one of the 100 Best Novels of the 20th Century by the Modern Library in 1998. The book was reprinted in 2001, and republished on 29 July 2010 by Grove Press.

In 1958, Norman Podhoretz, the editor of Commentary, noted in The New York Times that, "In recent months a large number of remarkably accomplished first novels by Americans have appeared, all of them bearing the usual exclamations of enthusiasm from the publishers on their dust jackets. What is most surprising, some of them – notably William Humphrey's Home From the Hill and J. P. Donleavy's The Ginger Man – justify the excitement. […] What really makes The Ginger Man a vital work is the fact that it both reflects and comments dramatically on the absurdities of an age clinging to values in which it simply cannot believe and unable to summon up the courage to find out what its moral convictions really are".

Writing in The Guardian in 2004, James Campbell judged that, "The Ginger Man still reads well today, once one becomes accustomed to its headlong rush of style, its frequent verbless sentences, the switch of tenses and the manic swing between first and third persons as it lunges to catch the protagonist's babbling thoughts […] In other places, the prose hops along alliteratively, with hints of Joyce and Dylan Thomas. Many chapters end with a snatch of verse, a habit that began in Donleavy's first book and became his signature tune".

In the 2010 reissue of The Ginger Man, Jay McInerney noted in the introduction that the book "has undoubtedly launched thousands of benders, but it has also inspired scores of writers with its vivid and visceral narrative voice and the sheer poetry of its prose".

== Adaptations ==
Donleavy wrote a stage adaptation of The Ginger Man, directed by Philip Wiseman, which opened in London in September 1959, with Richard Harris playing Dangerfield. In October, the play opened in Dublin, also starring Harris, and was closed after three performances, owing to the play's offensiveness (according to the Dublin critics), and following protests from the Catholic Church. All this is recorded by Donleavy in the 1961 Random House publication of the play with an essay by Donleavy, "What They Did in Dublin with The Ginger Man (a play)".

The BBC produced a 90-minute made-for-television version of the play, directed by Peter Dews, which aired on 23 March 1962 in the United Kingdom. Ann Bell played Marion Dangerfield, Ronald Fraser as Kenneth O'Keefe, Ian Hendry as Sebastian Balfe Dangerfield, and Margaret Tyzack was Miss Frost.

Donleavy asked director George Roy Hill to film the novel (the two of them - along with Gainor Crist, on whom the character of Sebastian Dangerfield was largely based - had been at Trinity together), but Hill felt that he would lose perspective because the project would be too close to his heart and his time as a young man at Trinity.

In 2005 there was reportedly discussion with actor Johnny Depp about starring in a film based on the novel. Rumors of getting the project started surfaced every year or two since 1998, including Depp traveling to Dublin to work on a script with Donleavy, and Depp enlisting Shane MacGowan for a part, but it never seemed to get going. In 2006 it appeared things were taking shape, with Depp selecting a director, Laurence Dunmore (The Libertine). Apparently, interest waned with the success of Pirates of the Caribbean. Depp returned to Ireland to meet with Donleavy again in the summer of 2008. As of June 2009, Donleavy was still hopeful that Depp would start the project in earnest.

The book also inspired songs of the same name, the first recorded by Geoff Muldaur, Fritz Richmond, and John Sebastian on the 1964 Elektra The Blues Project (EKL-264). (However, the liner notes for this album indicate that the song was a tribute to Richmond.) A second was written and recorded by Australian singer-songwriter Brian Cadd and was released as the first single from his self-titled debut album, released in October 1972.

== Bibliography ==
Donleavy, James Patrick:

- 1955: The Ginger Man. Olympia Press.

- 2001 (reprint): The Ginger Man. Grove Press. 2001. ISBN 978-0-8021-3795-1.

- 1961: The Ginger Man: A Play. Random House.

- (alternate title; 1961: What They Did in Dublin, With The Ginger Man, A Play. Macgibbon & Kee.)

- 1994: The History of The Ginger Man. Viking. ISBN 978-0-670-84793-8.
- 1964: 'Ginger Man' Geoff Muldaur, 'The Blues Project' Elektra Records EKS7264
