= Gold by the Inch =

1998 novel by Lawrence Chua

Gold By The Inch
- First edition
- Author: Lawrence Chua
- Cover artist: Daishin Rue Woods
- Language: English
- Publisher: Grove Press
- Publication date: 1998
- Publication place: United States
- Media type: Paperback
- Pages: 209
- ISBN: 0-8021-3649-4

Gold By The Inch is a novel by author Lawrence Chua.

== Plot ==
The novel is split into three sections.

=== Part 1 ===
The narrator is in Thailand visiting his younger brother, Luk, who works there as an architect. Thailand is the birthplace of the narrator's mother. He 'falls in love' with Thong, a Thai prostitute, during his visit. The book tracks the narrator's relationship with Thong. This relationship at first seems to be somewhat mutual but soon is clearly shown to be driven by money as Thong accepts every monetary gift doled out by the narrator. Thong eventually invites the narrator to live with him and his family instead of spending on expensive hotel rooms every night and it becomes evident that Thong is actually from a relatively wealthy family.

=== Part 2 ===
The narrator now leaves Thailand to visit family in Malaysia (Penang), the country in which his father was born. In this section, more information concerning the narrator's childhood and family is revealed. For instance, the narrator's father had a terrible relationship with his family in Malaysia as well as his own son and wife, whom he later left for an American woman. In this section, stories from the narrator's past are revealed and we learn that the narrator only began this journey because at home he just recently witnessed his father's death and the end of his relationship with boyfriend, Jim. His father had been living in Honolulu with wife and was near to death when the narrator decided it was okay to visit him. The narrator dated Jim in New York and the two's relationship was based on Jim's economic power and the narrator's aesthetic value. The relationship ended over Jim's inability to quit using drugs. Back in Malaysia, the narrator tours the city with his auntie. The narrator also neglects to tell the Luk, his mother, or his father's family in Malaysia that Ba, the narrator's father, has died. While in Malaysia, the narrator also devotedly thinks about Thong, whom he very much misses and completely ends his relationship with Jim by first reporting him to the authorities as a drug smuggler and then sending him a postcard that reads, 'Keep everything' (89). The narrator also spends some time trying to get a photograph of his grandmother whose death is surrounded by numerous stories. Post a conversation with his grandmother's spirit, the narrator finally decides his trip is completed and he is ready to return to Thong in Thailand.

=== Part 3 ===
The narrator makes a point of not contacting Thong right away until he sees him one night past weekend walk into the same bar the narrator is at with three friends. Thong's commitment to the narrator is suspect. The narrator moves into Thong's house but he sleeps separately from Thong on an entirely different floor. In general, Thong becomes more and more distant and less and less affectionate. As jealousy takes over the narrator, he spirals into a stronger and stronger drug addiction. At some point, the narrator and Thong bump into each other at a bar and through the translation of another friend, Thong breaks up with the narrator. Eventually, the narrator moves out of Thong's house. Luk and friends try to help the narrator recover from his breakup. In the end, the narrator realizes that in the end, he is just an American doing things in Thailand he would be unable to do back home. Though he tries to play this off as something that makes him invincible, in the end the narrator seems to realize that his trip is done, and he needs to return home though where home is the book does not specify.

== Characters ==
=== Narrator ===
Nameless protagonist born in Penang, Malaysia, who grew up in New York and travels to Thailand and Malaysia after visiting his dying father in Honolulu.

=== Thong ===
A male prostitute who sparks the narrator's love interest. While the narrator appears at times to have legitimate feelings for him, Thong makes it explicitly clear to him several times that he is interested in the narrator's personal finances.

=== Jim ===
The narrator's previous lover. No real attachment to him, but the narrator does admit he feels "safe" with him.

=== Luk ===
The narrator's brother who has lived away from him for a long time. He presents a more authentic "Thai-ness" than the narrator.

== Themes ==
=== Identity ===
The narrator never identifies himself as gay, yet he practices all of the social applications for being a homosexual (i.e., having sex only with men). Then again, being "gay" in a Thai sense does not necessarily mean the same as being a homosexual, as well as the issues with being a Kathoey and what is classified as a closet homosexual in the Western sense.

=== Authenticity ===
Language is a great indicator of authenticity. Dialect, regional tones, and "proper use" are all used to signify class characteristics like class, race, social status, and education. For example, when the narrator arrives in Malaysia, his family asks if he can still speak, implying that language is his connection to his culture and roots. Food is another signifier that is briefly mentioned throughout the novel.

=== Nostalgia ===
The lack of an 'authentic' space in each of the regions (Thailand, Malaysia) that he visits despite familial and personal ties complicates the narrator's search for identity in his homeland. The narrator's tie to each of his various ethnic backgrounds often becomes devalued by others due to language, cultural, and social barriers. The narrator attempts to search for a homeland and feels the emotion and nostalgia for a place that may or may not exist. Moreover, these feelings are complicated by his sexuality ("gay" in a Westernized sense compared to its Thai connotations), Thai sex culture, barriers of language (English, Thai, Malaysian) and Americanization. The summation of these attributes create a nostalgic feeling for an identity and homeland that is both distinctly unique yet not clearly defined. This is further complicated by the lack of any other individual, including any family members with similar identity issues. For example, his one brother, Luk, embraces a Thai identity and lives in Thailand as an architect.

== Settings and significance ==
New York - The narrator's "actual" home, where the narrator lived with this mother growing up and where he previously lived with Jim.

Malaysia - Where the narrator's father emigrated and where the narrator's paternal family still lives.

Thailand - Where the narrator's mother and father are ethnically from, as well as where his brother currently lives.

Honolulu, Hawaii - Where the narrator's father took his last residence with his current wife and eventually died.

== Close readings of selected pages/passages ==
=== King Rubber ===
The narrator who grew up in New York and speaks English, as his primary language allows a Dutch man whose English is actually poor compared to the narrator's, to completely orientalize him. Based on the narrator's physical features and fumbling for English words, the Dutch man assumes that the narrator is a Thai prostitute and invites him to his hotel room. Before partaking in sexual intercourse, the Dutch man pulls out a pair of rubber shorts and shirt. This is significant, because in Thai history, rubber trees were introduced by the British since the soil in Thailand was fertile and suitable for growing rubber. However, rubber tree plantations had devastating environmental effects due to the use of arsenic trioxide, a carcinogenic compound, as well as abstract adverse health effects.
