= Oliver Harris (author) =

British crime novelist

Oliver Harris (b. 1978) is a British author of crime fiction and thrillers, who lives in South London.

== Early life and education ==
Oliver Harris was born in 1978, in North London. He studied at University College London, gaining a first degree in English Literature and an MA in Shakespeare studies. He undertook research at the London Consortium, where his 2013 PhD thesis (Between nature and the gods: Lacan's return to antiquity) was supervised by Steven Connor. In 2004, he graduated with an MA in creative writing (Prose Fiction) from the University of East Anglia.

== Career ==
=== Academia ===
Harris works as a Senior Lecturer at the Manchester Writing School within the School of English at Manchester Metropolitan University.

=== Writing ===
Harris's first crime novel, The Hollow Man was published in 2011. This novel's protagonist, Nick Belsey, a corrupt detective, featured in two further novels: Deep Shelter (2014) and The House of Fame (2016). In 2019, Harris published A Shadow Intelligence, with a new protagonist: Elliot Kane, a British spy. Another Elliot Kane novel was published in 2021, before Harris returned to Nick Belsey in 2022 and then again to Elliot Kane in 2024.

Harris has been described as "a gin-dry, Chandleresque kind of writer'". Scottish author Val McDermid described his Nick Belsey novels as "bringing a hard edge to stories of contemporary policing – stories that embrace corruption, disloyalty and darkness."

Harris has written for The Times Literary Supplement. He also mentors other authors and aspiring authors.

== Works ==
=== Nick Belsey series ===
- The Hollow Man. London: Jonathan Cape. 2011. ISBN 978-0224091220.
- Deep Shelter. London: Jonathan Cape. 2014. ISBN 978-0224091237.
- The House of Fame. London: Jonathan Cape. 2016. ISBN 978-0224101875.
- A Season in Exile. London: Little, Brown. 2022. ISBN 978-1408712924.

=== Elliot Kane Series ===
- A Shadow Intelligence. London: Little, Brown. 2019. ISBN 978-1408709924.
- Ascension. London: Little, Brown. 2021. ISBN 978-1408709955.
- The Shame Archive. London: Abacus. 2024. ISBN 978-1408717455.

=== Non-fiction ===
- Lacan's Return to Antiquity: Between nature and the gods. London: Routledge. 2016. ISBN 978-1138820388.
