= A Fairy Tale of New York =

Book by J.P. Donleavy

- First US edition
- Author: J. P. Donleavy
- Language: English
- Publisher: Delacorte Press (US); Methuen (UK)
- Publication date: Sep 1973
- Publication place: United States
- Media type: Print (hardcover)
- Pages: 341 pp
- ISBN: 0-440-02624-5 (US)

A Fairy Tale of New York is a novel by Irish American writer J. P. Donleavy, published in 1973. The plot concerns Irish-American Cornelius Christian's return to New York after studying in Ireland. The novel was based on Donleavy's earlier work Fairy Tales of New York, a successful stage play published in 1961.

== Synopsis ==
Cornelius Christian is an American expatriate who arrives back in his native New York City from Ireland. His wife became ill and died aboard ship, and, with limited resources, he agrees to take a job in a funeral home owned by Clarence Vine, a wealthy businessman and mortician, in order to pay for his wife's funeral and interment. As a New York native originally from the Bronx he meets people from his past, gets himself into difficult situations with his landlady, his first girlfriend, Charlotte, his clients, dead and alive, and his co-workers at the funeral home and his boss. In one episode, he meets Fanny Sourpuss whose husband has just died. She is a very rich widow who begins an on-off relationship with Cornelius. After a while, he tries his hand at preparing corpses himself, and his first attempt is greeted with horror by the dead man's widow who, making a scene, causes him to insult her and storm off, presuming that he is fired.

Cornelius, is, however, very adept at fisticuffs, and deals expeditiously with Fanny's ex-husband (who is stalking her), her doorman, and in situations such as when he is lured into a clip joint by a prostitute and has to fight his way out. Eventually, this predilection for violence catches up with him. He runs into Charlotte, his first girlfriend. He finds another job with a spark plug manufacturer named Mott who hires Cornelius to work in his idea room where Cornelius makes a nuisance of himself. Fanny, whom he seems to love, has developed cancer, and takes a train to Minnesota (presumably to the Mayo Clinic).

The end of the novel is populated by flashbacks and dream sequences regarding his rather callous farming out to a foster home when he was a child, to his early days with Charlotte in the Bronx, to a climactic pair of scenes where he gets in a bar fight and ends up in hospital, and later takes Charlotte to a fancy French restaurant and gets snubbed by the staff there. In the last scene, he books his passage back to Europe on another steamer.

== Legacy ==
The book inspired the title, but not the content, of the 1987 song "Fairytale of New York", written by Jem Finer and Shane MacGowan, and recorded by The Pogues with MacGowan and Kirsty MacColl on vocals.

== Bibliography ==
- A Fairy Tale of New York. Atlantic Monthly Press. 1994. ISBN 978-0-87113-264-2. (Novel) Delacorte Press, New York 1973
