= Christopher Logue =

English poet (1926–2011)

Christopher Logue CBE
- Born: John Christopher Logue; 23 November 1926; Portsmouth, Hampshire, England
- Died: 2 December 2011 (aged 85)
- Education: St John's College, Portsmouth, Prior Park College, Portsmouth Grammar School; University College London (did not graduate)
- Occupations: Author; playwright; screenwriter; actor
- Spouse: Rosemary Hill (m. 1985)
- Writing career
- Pen name: Count Palmiro Vicarion
- Period: 20th Century
- Genres: Philosophy, literary criticism, parapsychology

Christopher Logue, CBE (23 November 1926 – 2 December 2011) was an English poet associated with the British Poetry Revival, and a pacifist.

== Life ==
Born in Portsmouth, Hampshire, and brought up in the Portsmouth area, Logue was the only child of middle-aged parents, John and Molly Logue, who married late. He attended Roman Catholic schools, including St John's College, Portsmouth, Prior Park College, before going to Portsmouth Grammar School. On call-up, he enlisted in the Black Watch, and was posted to Palestine. He was court-martialled in 1945 over a scheme to sell stolen pay books, and sentenced to 16 months' imprisonment, served partly in Acre Prison. He lived in Paris from 1951 to 1956, and was a friend of Alexander Trocchi.

In 1958 he joined the first of the Aldermaston Marches, organised by the Direct Action Committee Against Nuclear War. He was on the Committee of 100. He served a month in jail for refusing to be bound over not to continue with the 17 September 1961 Parliament Square sit-down. He heard Bertrand Russell tell the Bow Street magistrate, "I came here to save your life. But, having heard what you have to say, I don't think the end justifies the means." In Drake Hall open prison he and fellow protesters were set to work – "Some wit allocated it" – demolishing a munitions factory.

He was friends for many years with author and translator Austryn Wainhouse, with whom he carried on a lively correspondence for decades.

== Career ==
Logue was a playwright and screenwriter as well as a film actor. His screenplays were Savage Messiah and The End of Arthur's Marriage. He was a contributor to Private Eye magazine between 1962 and 1993, as well as writing for Alexander Trocchi's literary journal, Merlin. Logue won the 2005 Whitbread Poetry Award for Cold Calls.

His early popularity was marked by the release of a loose adaptation of Pablo Neruda's Twenty Love Poems, later broadcast on BBC Radio's Third Programme on 8 March 1959 with the poems, read by Logue himself, set to jazz by pianist Bill Le Sage and drummer Tony Kinsey and a band featuring Kenny Napper on bass, Ken Wray on trombone and Les Condon on trumpet. A version of the performance was later released as a 7-inch EP (extended play) record, "Red Bird: Jazz and Poetry".

One of his poems, Be Not Too Hard, was set to music by Donovan and heard in the film Poor Cow (1967), and was made popular by Joan Baez on her eponymous 1967 album, Joan. Another completely different song titled "Be Not Too Hard" based on the poem was performed by Manfred Mann's Earth Band on their 1974 album The Good Earth. The arrangement was written by Mick Rogers, who had Logue credited as a co-writer on the record sleeve. Another well-known and well-quoted poem by Logue was Come to the Edge, which is often attributed to Guillaume Apollinaire, but is in fact only dedicated to him. It was originally written for a poster advertising an Apollinaire exhibition at the ICA in 1961 or 1962, and was titled "Apollinaire Said", hence the misattribution. His last major work was a long-term project to render Homer's Iliad into a modernist idiom. This work is published in a number of small books, usually equating to two or three books of the original text. (The volume, Homer: War Music, was shortlisted for the 2002 International Griffin Poetry Prize.) He published an autobiography, Prince Charming (1999).

His lines tended to be short, pithy and frequently political, as in Song of Autobiography:

I, Christopher Logue, was baptised the year
Many thousands of Englishmen,
Fists clenched, their bellies empty,
Walked day and night on the capital city. (Note: The Jarrow March took place in October 1936)

He wrote the couplet that is sung at the beginning and end of the film A High Wind in Jamaica (1965), the screenplay for Savage Messiah (1972), a television version of Antigone (1962), and a short play for the TV series The Wednesday Play titled The End of Arthur's Marriage (1965), which was directed by Ken Loach. The latter film was generally light-hearted, but dealt with the pre-occupation in modern British society with ownership of property and with the treatment of animals by humans.

He appeared in a number of films as an actor, most notably in the Ken Russell films The Devils (1971, as Cardinal Richelieu) and Prisoner of Honor (1991, as Fernand Labori), and as the spaghetti-eating fanatic in Terry Gilliam's Jabberwocky (1977). Logue wrote for the Olympia Press under the pseudonym Count Palmiro Vicarion, including a pornographic novel, Lust.

== Family ==
Logue married historian and biographer Rosemary Hill in 1985. He died on 2 December 2011, aged 85.

== Works ==
=== Poetry ===
- Wand and Quadrant, Paris: Collection Merlin, 1953
- The Weekdream Sonnets, Jack Straw Press, Paris, 1955
- Devil, Maggot and Son, Peter Russell, 1956
- The Man Who Told His Love, Scorpion Press, 1958
- A Song for Kathleen, Villiers, 1958
- Songs, Hutchinsin & Co., 1959
- Songs from the Lily-White Boys, Scorpion Press, 1960
- 7 Songs from the Establishment, Sydney Bron Music Co. Ltd., London, 1962
- Count Palmiro Vicarion's Book of Limericks, Paris: Olympia Press, 1962
- Count Palmiro Vicarion's Book of Bawdy Ballads, Paris: Olympia Press, 1962
- The Arrival of the Poet in the City, The Yellow Press / Mandarin Books, 1963
- Patrocleia, University of Michigan Press, 1963
- The Words of the Establishment Songs etcetera, London: Poet & Printer, 1966
- Selections from a Correspondence Between an Irishman and a Rat, London: Goliard Press, 1966
- PAX - Book XIX of The Iliad, London: Rapp & Carroll Ltd, 1967
- Hermes Flew to Olympus (self-published), 1968
- The Girls, Bernard Stone, 1969
- New Numbers, Jonathan Cape, 1969
- How to Find Poetry Everywhere (self-published), 1970
- For Talitha. 1941-1971., Steam Press, 1971
- The Isles of Jessamy, November Books, 1971
- Twelve Cards, Lorrimer Publishing Ltd, 1971
- Duet for Mole and Worm, Cafe Books, 1972
- What, The Keepsake Press, 1972
- Singles, John Roberts Press, 1973
- Mixed Rushes, John Roberts Press, 1974
- Urbanal, (self-published) 1975
- Red Bird- Love Poems based on the Spanish of Pablo Neruda, Circle Press, 1979
- Ode to the dodo: poems from 1953 to 1978, Cape, 1981, ISBN 978-0-224-01892-0
- Fluff, Bernard Stone, 1984
- Lucky Dust, Anvil Press, 1985
- The Seven Deadly Sins- Translations of Bertolt Brecht, Ambit Books, 1986
- War Music. J. Cape. 1981. ISBN 978-0-224-01534-9.; University of Chicago Press, 2003, ISBN 978-0-226-49190-5
- Kings: An Account of Books 1 and 2 of Homer's Iliad, Farrar, Straus, and Giroux, 1991, ISBN 978-0-374-18151-2
- The Husbands: An Account of Books 3 and 4 of Homer's Iliad, Farrar, Straus, and Giroux, 1995, ISBN 978-0-374-17391-3
- Selected Poems, Faber and Faber, 1996, ISBN 978-0-571-17761-5
- All Day Permanent Red. Macmillan. 2003. ISBN 978-0-374-52929-1.
- Cold Calls: War Music continued, Volume 1, Faber and Faber, 2005, ISBN 978-0-571-20277-5

=== Prose ===
- Prince Charming: a memoir, Faber and Faber, 1999, ISBN 978-0-571-19768-2; Faber, 2001, ISBN 978-0-571-20361-1
- Lust. Paris: Ophelia Press. 1959. ISBN 9781596542068. OCLC 38894237.; (under pseudonym of Count Palmiro Vicarion), Olympia Press, 2005, ISBN 978-1-59654-206-8

== In popular culture ==
In Monday Begins on Saturday, a 1964 science fiction/fantasy novel by Arkady and Boris Strugatsky, Magnus Red'kin, a character in the novel, quotes a fragment of a Logue poem:

You ask me:
What is the greatest happiness on earth?
Two things:
changing my mind
as I change a penny for a shilling;
and
listening to the sound
of a young girl
singing down the road
after she has asked me the way –

as one of the definitions of happiness from his extensive collection, and complains that "such things do not allow for algorithmisation".

In the 1967 TV programme Donovan Meets Logue, the following Logue poems were featured:

- "The Plane Crash"
- "Be Not Too Hard"

and

Last night in London Airport
I saw a wooden bin
labelled
"Unwanted literature is to be placed herein"
So I wrote a poem
And put it in.
