= Richard Seaver =

American publisher (1926–2009)

- Born: December 31, 1926; Watertown, Connecticut, US
- Died: January 5, 2009 (aged 82); New York City, US
- Education: University of North Carolina
- Occupations: Author, editor, translator, publisher
- Spouse: Jeannette Medina (married 1953–2009)

Richard Woodward Seaver (December 31, 1926 – January 5, 2009) was an American translator, editor and publisher. Seaver was instrumental in defying censorship, to bring to light works by authors such as Samuel Beckett, Jean Genet, Henry Miller, William S. Burroughs, Hubert Selby, Eugène Ionesco, E. M. Cioran, D. H. Lawrence, Jack Kerouac, Robert Coover, Harold Pinter and the Marquis de Sade.

== Life ==
Seaver was born in Watertown, Connecticut, on December 31, 1926. He graduated from the University of North Carolina. After graduation he taught high school briefly before he traveled abroad to Paris and the Sorbonne while writing his dissertation on James Joyce.

While a Fulbright scholar in Paris, writing his thesis on James Joyce at the Sorbonne in the early 1950s, he co-founded the English-language literary quarterly Merlin, which published early works by Eugène Ionesco and Jean Genet.

In 1952, Seaver wrote an essay lauding the work of the then little-known novelist Samuel Beckett. This essay became instrumental in Beckett's finding an American publisher and champion.

While abroad, Seaver met Jeannette Medina, whom he married in 1953.

Before returning to the United States and settling in New York City with his wife, he spent two years in the United States Navy.

He and his wife of 55 years Jeannette ran Arcade Publishing, from 1988 until his death.

In 1959, Seaver went to work for Grove Press, where he eventually rose to the position of editor in chief. In 1967, he was among more than 500 writers and editors who signed the "Writers and Editors War Tax Protest" pledge, vowing to refuse to pay the 10% Vietnam War Tax surcharge proposed by president Johnson.

In 1971, he left Grove Press and went to work for Viking Press. After Viking, he became the president and publisher of Holt, Rinehart and Winston's trade division and then started his own company Arcade Publishing.

In his memoir, Seaver recalls the moment in 1952, when he wrote a first, and seminal essay extolling the work of then-unknown Samuel Beckett.

He was 25 and had just finished reading the novels Molloy and Malone Dies, which he believed were masterpieces:

"How do you write a meaningful comment on such rich, complex, still undiscovered work, without making a critical fool of yourself?" he wrote. "So make a fool of yourself." "Out, damned modesty," he added. "If conviction means anything, then write from the heart. Slightly less tentatively, I wrote: 'Samuel Beckett, an Irish writer long established in France, has recently published two novels which, although they defy all commentary, merit the attention of anyone interested in this century's literature.'"

== Death ==
Seaver died on January 5, 2009, in Manhattan, New York, after a heart attack.

A book by Seaver was published posthumously in 2012, The Tender Hour of Twilight. Paris in the '50s, New York in the '60s: A Memoir of Publishing's Golden Age, edited by Jeannette Seaver.
