= J. P. Donleavy =

Novelist, playwright, essayist

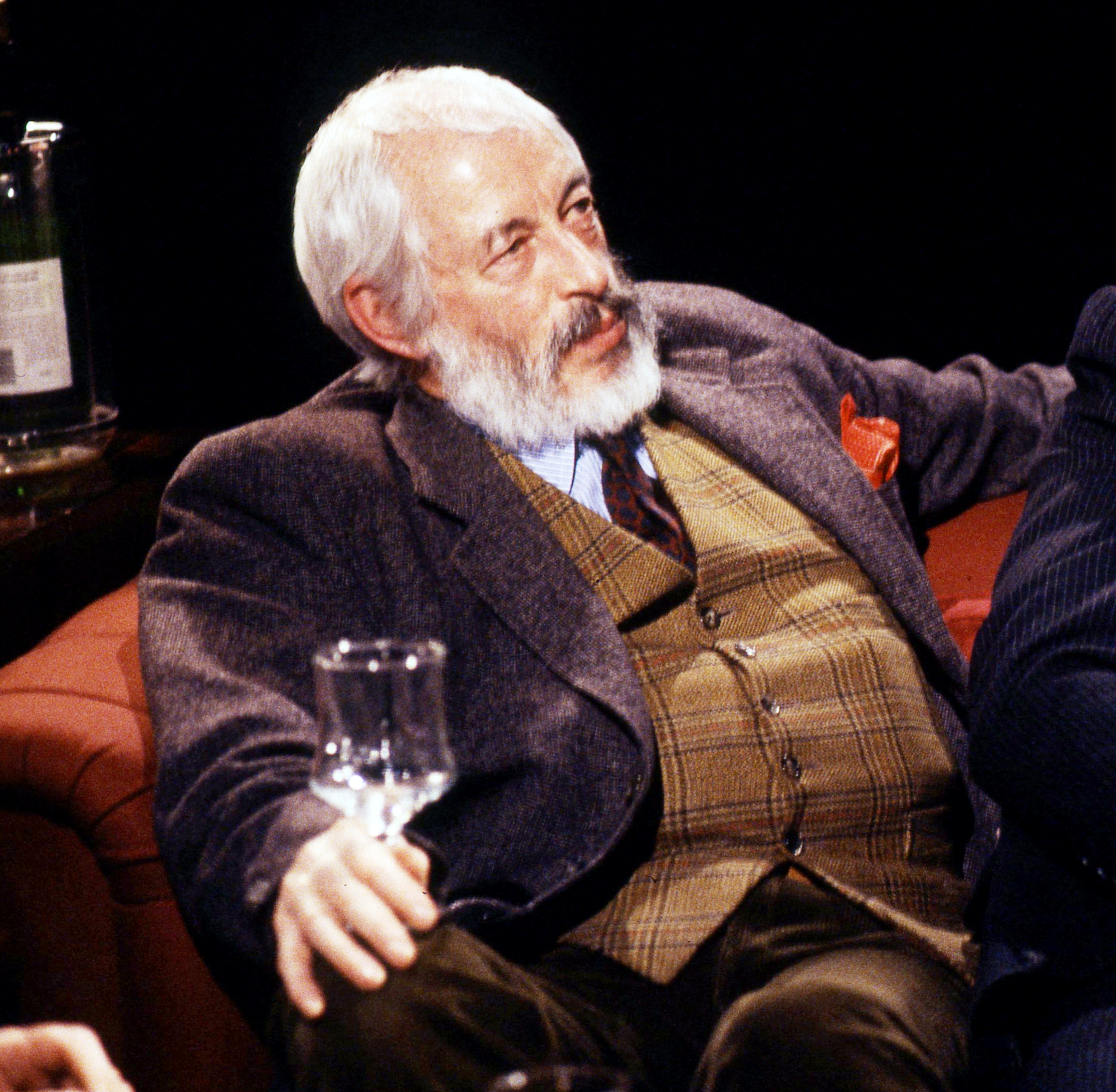
- Donleavy appearing on After Dark in 1991
- Born: James Patrick Donleavy; 23 April 1926; Brooklyn, New York, U.S.
- Died: 11 September 2017 (aged 91); Mullingar, County Westmeath, Ireland
- Resting place: Levington Park estate, County Westmeath
- Education: Trinity College Dublin (1946–1949; no degree)
- Occupations: Author; novelist; short story writer; playwright
- Spouses: Valerie Heron (m. 1946–1969); Mary Wilson Price (m. 1970–1989)
- Children: 2 children, 2 stepchildren
- Writing career
- Pen name: J. P. Donleavy
- Language: English
- Years active: 1955–2017
- Period: Modern
- Genres: Prose fiction, satire, dark humor
- Notable works: The Ginger Man (1955); A Fairy Tale of New York (1973); The Beastly Beatitudes of Balthazar B (1968)
- Notable awards: Bord Gáis Lifetime Achievement Award
- Movement: Black comedy

James Patrick Donleavy, popularly known as J. P. Donleavy, (23 April 1926 – 11 September 2017) was an American-Irish author, short story writer, novelist, and playwright. Known for the dark humor in his writings, he first achieved critical acclaim with his picaresque novel The Ginger Man (1955), initially published in Paris. The novel became an international bestseller, selling 50 million copies worldwide. It is one of the best-selling books of all time and has been translated into over 30 languages. The novel is Donleavy's best-known work, and in 1998, it was ranked 99th by the Modern Library in its list of the "100 Best Novels of the 20th century".

Donleavy is also the author of A Fairy Tale of New York, published in 1973, and The Beastly Beatitudes of Balthazar B, published in 1968. He received the Bob Hughes Lifetime Achievement Award, funded by Bord Gáis Energy, for his contributions to Irish literature in 2015.

== Early life ==
Donleavy was born in Brooklyn, to Irish immigrants Margaret and Patrick Donleavy, and grew up in the Bronx. His father was a firefighter, and his mother came from a wealthy background. He had a sister, Mary Rita, and a younger brother. He received his education at schools in the United States, then served in the US Navy during World War II. After the war ended, he moved to Ireland. In 1946 he began studying bacteriology at Trinity College Dublin, but left in 1949 before taking a degree.

== Career ==
Donleavy's first published work was a short story entitled A Party on Saturday Afternoon, which appeared in the Dublin literary periodical Envoy in 1950. He gained critical acclaim with his first novel, The Ginger Man (1955), which is one of the Modern Library 100 best novels. The novel, of which Donleavy's friend and fellow writer Brendan Behan was the first person to read the completed manuscript, was banned in Ireland and the United States by reason of obscenity.

The Ginger Man was known for its outspoken and comic lewdness. Lead character Sebastian Dangerfield was in part based on Trinity College companion Gainor Crist, an American Navy veteran also studying at Trinity College on the G.I. Bill, whom Donleavy once described in an interview as a "saint", though of a Rabelaisian kind.

Correctly or incorrectly, his initial works are sometimes grouped with the kitchen sink artists as well as the "Angry Young Men". Another novel, A Fairy Tale of New York, provided the title of the song "Fairytale of New York".

In March 2007, Donleavy was the castaway on BBC Radio 4's Desert Island Discs.

In 2015, Donleavy was the recipient of the Bob Hughes Lifetime Achievement Award at the Bord Gáis Energy Irish Book Awards.

In 2016, Trinity College Dublin awarded him an honorary doctorate.

== Personal life ==
Donleavy declared himself to be an atheist at the age of 14. In 1946, he married Valerie Heron. The couple had two children: Philip (born 1951) and Karen (born 1955). They divorced in 1969. In 1970 he married Mary Wilson Price; that union ended in divorce in 1989.

In 2011, it was reported that Donleavy had not fathered his two children with Price. A DNA test in the early 1990s had confirmed that Rebecca was the daughter of brewing scion Kieran Guinness, and Rory was the son of Kieran's older brother Finn, whom Price married after her divorce from Donleavy. "My interest is only to look after the welfare of the child," Donleavy told The Times, "and after a certain stage, you can't worry about their parentage".

Donleavy lived in London in the 1950s and then Maughold, Isle of Man, in the 1960s, where the two children were educated. From 1972, Donleavy lived at Levington Park, a country house set in 200 acres (0.81 km^{2}), beside Lough Owel, near Mullingar, County Westmeath. Throughout much of his life, he was known as Mike by close friends, though the origins of this nickname are unclear.

Donleavy died on 11 September 2017, aged 91.

== List of works ==
=== Novels ===
- The Ginger Man (Olympia, 1955)
- A Singular Man (Little, Brown, 1963)
- The Beastly Beatitudes of Balthazar B (Delacorte, 1968)
- The Onion Eaters (Delacorte, 1971)
- A Fairy Tale of New York (Delacorte, 1973)
- The Destinies of Darcy Dancer, Gentleman (Delacorte, 1977)
- Schultz (Delacorte, 1979)
- Leila: Further in the Destinies of Darcy Dancer, Gentleman (Delacorte, 1983)
- Are You Listening Rabbi Löw (Viking, 1987)
- That Darcy, That Dancer, That Gentleman (Penguin, 1990)
- Wrong Information is Being Given Out at Princeton (Little, Brown, 1998)
- A Letter Marked Personal (Lilliput, 2019)

=== Plays ===
- The Ginger Man (1959)
- Fairy Tales of New York (1960)
- A Singular Man (1964)
- The Saddest Summer of Samuel S (1972)
- The Plays of J. P. Donleavy (Delacorte, 1972)
- The Beastly Beatitudes of Balthazar B (1981)

=== Short fiction ===
- Meet My Maker the Mad Molecule (Little, Brown, 1964)
- The Saddest Summer of Samuel S (Delacorte, 1966)
- The Lady Who Liked Clean Rest Rooms (Thornwillow, 1995)

=== Other books ===
- The Unexpurgated Code: A Complete Manual of Survival & Manners (Delacorte, 1975)
- De Alfonce Tennis: The Superlative Game of Eccentric Champions (Dutton, 1984)
- J. P. Donleavy's Ireland: In All Her Sins and Some of Her Graces (Viking, 1986)
- A Singular Country (Norton, 1989)
- The History of the Ginger Man (Viking, 1994)
- An Author and His Image: The Collected Short Pieces (Viking, 1997)
