= Frank Harris =

Irish-American writer (1856–1931)

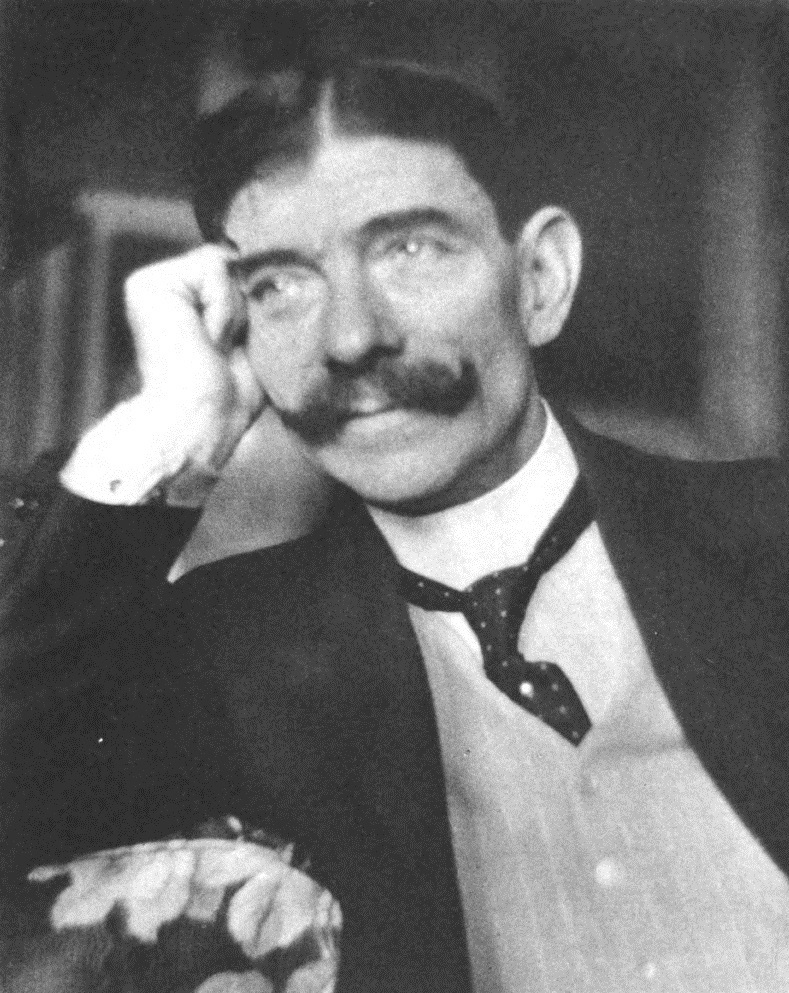
- Frank Harris, photo by Alvin Langdon Coburn
- Born: James Thomas Harris; 14 February 1856; Ireland
- Died: 27 August 1931 (aged 75); Nice, France
- Occupations: Editor, novelist, writer, journalist, publisher

Frank Harris (14 February 1856 – 27 August 1931) was an Irish-American editor, novelist, short story writer, journalist and publisher, who was friendly with many well-known figures of his day.

Born in Ireland, he emigrated to the United States early in life, working in a variety of unskilled jobs before attending the University of Kansas to study law. After graduation, he quickly tired of his legal career and returned to Europe sometime prior to 1882. He traveled in continental Europe before settling in London to pursue a career in journalism. In 1921, in his sixties, he became a US citizen. Though he attracted much attention during his life for his irascible, aggressive personality, editorship of famous periodicals, and friendship with the talented and famous, he is remembered mainly for his multiple-volume memoir My Life and Loves, which was banned in countries around the world for its sexual explicitness.

== Biography ==
=== Early years ===
Harris was born James Thomas Harris in 1856, in Galway, Ireland, to Welsh parents. His father, Thomas Vernon Harris, was a naval officer from Fishguard, Pembrokeshire, Wales. While living with his older brother he was, for a year or more, a pupil at The Royal School, Armagh. At the age of 12 he was sent to Wales to continue his education as a boarder at the Ruabon Grammar School in Denbighshire, a time he was to remember later in My Life and Loves. Harris was unhappy at the school and ran away within a year.

He emigrated to the United States in late 1869, arriving in New York City virtually penniless. The 14-year-old took a series of odd jobs to support himself, working first as a boot black, a porter, a general laborer, and a construction worker on the erection of the Brooklyn Bridge. Harris would later turn these early occupational experiences into art, incorporating tales from them into his book The Bomb.

From New York Harris moved to the American Midwest, settling in the country's second largest city, Chicago, where he took a job as a hotel clerk and eventually a manager. Owing to Chicago's central place in the meat packing industry, Harris made the acquaintance of various cattlemen, who inspired him to leave the big city to take up work as a cowboy. Eventually growing tired of life in the cattle industry, he enrolled at the University of Kansas, where he studied law and earned a degree, gaining admission to the Kansas state bar association.

In 1878, in Brighton, England, he married Florence Ruth Adams, who died the following year.

=== Return to Europe ===
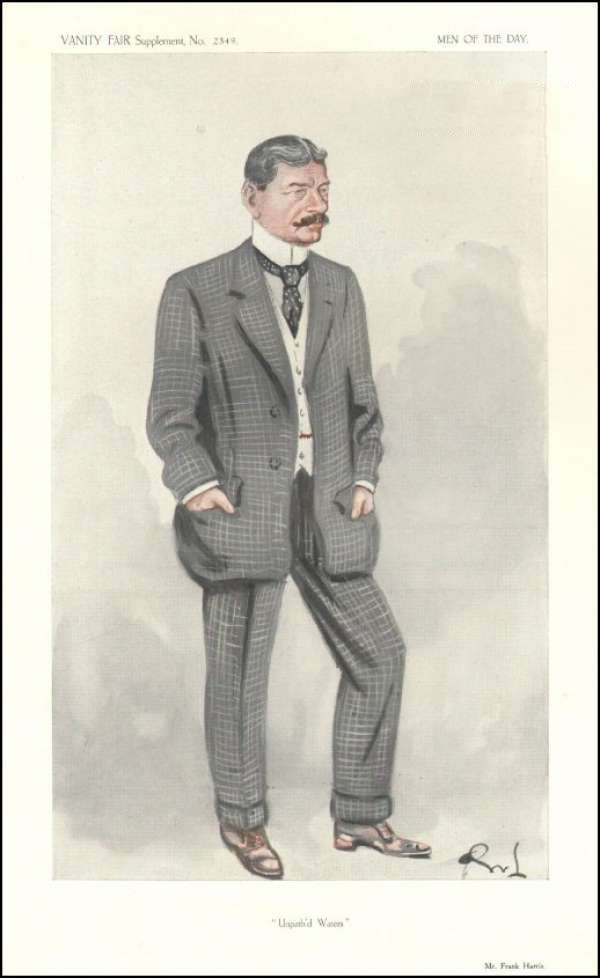
Harris caricatured by OWL in Vanity Fair, 1913

Harris was not cut out to be a lawyer and soon decided to turn his attention to literature. He moved to England in 1882, later traveling to various cities in Germany, Austria, France, and Greece on his literary quest. He worked briefly as an American newspaper correspondent before settling down in England to seriously pursue the vocation of journalism.

Harris first came to general notice as the editor of a series of London publications, including the Evening News, the Fortnightly Review and the Saturday Review, the last-named being the high point of his journalistic career, with H. G. Wells and George Bernard Shaw as regular contributors.

From 1908 to 1914 Harris concentrated on working as a novelist, authoring a series of popular books such as The Bomb, The Man Shakespeare, and The Yellow Ticket and Other Stories. With the advent of World War I in the summer of 1914, Harris decided to return to the United States.

From 1916 to 1922 he edited the U.S. edition of Pearson's Magazine, a popular monthly which combined short story fiction with socialist-tinted features on contemporary news topics. One issue of the publication was banned from the mails by Postmaster General Albert S. Burleson during the period of American participation in the Great War. Despite this Harris managed to navigate the delicate situation which faced the left-wing press and to keep Pearson's Magazine functioning and solvent during the war years.

Harris became an American citizen in April 1921. In 1922 he travelled to Berlin to publish his best-known work, his autobiography My Life and Loves (published in four volumes, 1922–1927). It is notorious for its graphic descriptions of Harris' purported sexual encounters and for its exaggeration of the scope of his adventures and his role in history. Years later, Time magazine reflected in its 21 March 1960 issue "Had he not been a thundering liar, Frank Harris would have been a great autobiographer ... he had the crippling disqualification that he told the truth, as Max Beerbohm remarked, only 'when his invention flagged'." Among the many aspects of Harris' life not treated in the autobiography is his first marriage (to Adams). A fifth volume, supposedly taken from his notes but of doubtful provenance, was published in 1954, long after his death.

Harris also wrote short stories and novels, two books on Shakespeare, a series of biographical sketches in five volumes under the title Contemporary Portraits and biographies of his friends Oscar Wilde and George Bernard Shaw. His attempts at playwriting were less successful: only Mr. and Mrs. Daventry (1900) (which may have been based on an idea by Oscar Wilde) was produced on the stage.

=== Death and legacy ===
Married three times, Harris died at 9 Rue de la Buffa in Nice aged 75 on 27 August 1931, of a heart attack. He was subsequently buried at Cimetière Sainte-Marguerite, adjacent to the Cimetière Caucade, in the same city.

Just after his death a biography written by Hugh Kingsmill (pseudonym of Hugh Kingsmill Lunn) was published.

== Works ==
- Dulce Domum London: Kegan Paul, 1886). Reprinted Articles from the Saturday Review"
- Elder Conklin and Other Stories (1894)
- Montes the Matador and Other Stories (London: Grant Richards, 1900)
- The Bomb (1908)
- The Man Shakespeare and his Tragic Life Story (London: Frank Palmer, 1909)
- Shakespeare and His Love: A Play in Four Acts and an Epilogue (London: Frank Palmer, 1910)
- The women of Shakespeare (New York: Mitchell Kennerley, 1912). Criticism.
- Unpath'd Waters (1915). Stories.
- The Yellow Ticket and Other Stories (London: Grant Richards, 1914)
- The Veils of Isis, and Other Stories (1915)
- England or Germany? (1915)
- Contemporary Portraits... in four vols (1915–1923)
- Oscar Wilde, His Life and Confessions (1916)
- Stories of Jesus the Christ (1919)
- My Life and Loves (1922–1927, 1931, 1954, 1963 (complete))
- Undream'd of Shores (London, Grant Richards, 1924). Stories.
- The Tom Cat: An Apologue (1928). Short story.
- My Reminiscences as a Cowboy (1930)
- Confessional (1930). Essays.
- Pantopia: A Novel (1930)
- Bernard Shaw (1931)
- The Short Stories of Frank Harris, a Selection (1975). Elmer Gertz, ed.
