= Olympia Press =

French publisher

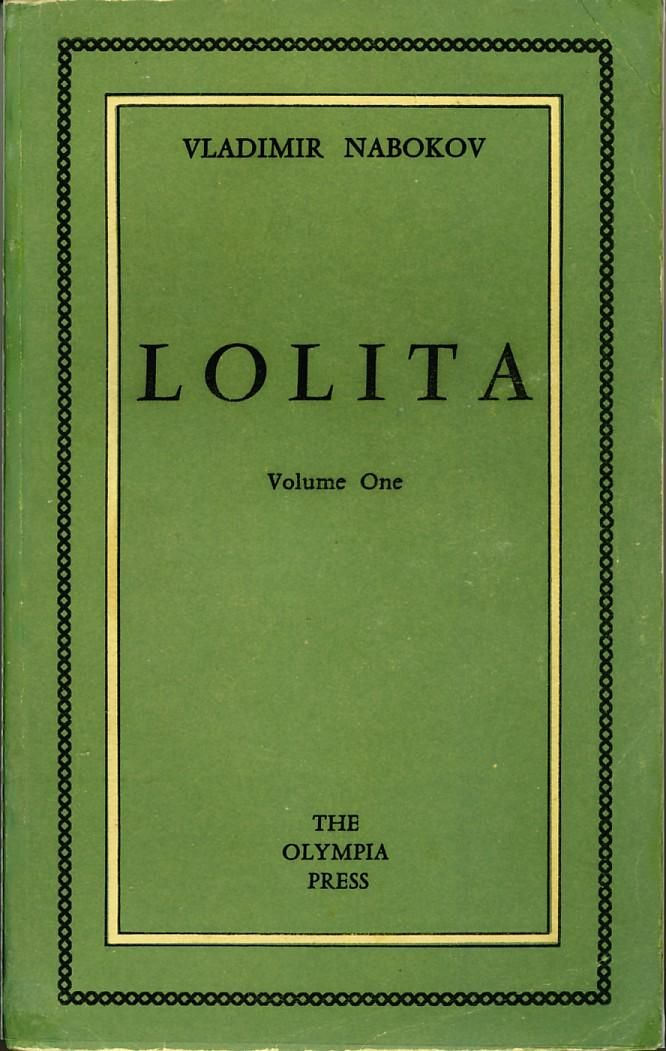
First edition cover of Lolita

Olympia Press was a Paris-based publisher, launched in 1953 by Maurice Girodias as a rebranded version of the Obelisk Press he inherited from his father Jack Kahane. It published a mix of erotic fiction and avant-garde literary fiction, and is best known for issuing the first printed edition of Vladimir Nabokov's Lolita.

In its heyday during the mid-fifties Olympia Press specialized in books which could not be published (without legal action) in the English-speaking world. Early on, Girodias relied on the permissive attitudes of the French to publish sexually explicit books in both French and English. In the late 1950s, the French authorities began to ban and seize the press's books.

A total of 94 Olympia Press publications were promoted and packaged as "Traveller's Companion" books, usually with simple text-only covers, and each edition in the series was numbered. The "Ophelia Press" line of erotica was far larger, using the same design, but pink covers instead of green.

Olympia Press was the first publisher willing to print William S. Burroughs's avant-garde, sexually explicit Naked Lunch, which soon became famous. Other notable works included J. P. Donleavy's The Ginger Man; Samuel Beckett's French trilogy Molloy, Malone Dies, and The Unnamable; Henry Miller's trilogy The Rosy Crucifixion, consisting of Sexus, Nexus and Plexus; A Tale of Satisfied Desire by Georges Bataille; Story of O by Pauline Réage; Terry Southern and Mason Hoffenberg's Candy; Alex Austin's The Blue Guitar and Eleanore; and a critical book on Scientology, Inside Scientology/Dianetics by Robert Kaufman. The South African poet Sinclair Beiles was an editor at the publisher. Other authors included Alexander Trocchi, Iris Owens (Harriet Daimler) and John Stevenson (Marcus Van Heller).

Girodias had troubled dealings with his authors including copyright issues. Nabokov was dissatisfied with the copyediting, assignment of copyright and the press's literary reputation. The press engaged in a long-running dispute over the rights to The Ginger Man, which ended with Donleavy's wife Mary buying out Girodias at what was intended to be a closed auction. Forced to leave France in 1963, Girodias briefly reestablished Olympia Press in New York in the 1960s, and in London in the early 1970s.

Grove Press in the U.S. would later print The Olympia Reader, a best-selling anthology containing material from some of Olympia's most popular works, including material by Burroughs, Miller, Trocchi and others. Another well-known collection was The Best of Olympia, first published by the Olympia Press in 1963 and reprinted by New English Library in 1966.

Other incarnations of the company, some with Girodias' support, emerged in Germany, Italy, and the United Kingdom. Olympia Press has been re-established and is currently operating out of Washington, London, and Frankfurt.

== Works in the Traveller's Companion Series ==
No.	Title	Author
1	The Enormous Bed	Henry Jones (pseudonym for John Coleman)
2	Rape	Marcus Van Heller (John Stevenson)
3	School for Sin	Frances Lengel (pseudonym for Alexander Trocchi)
4	The Libertine	Robert Desmond
5	Play This Love With Me	Willie Baron (pseudonym for Baird Bryant)
6	Tender Was My Flesh	Winifred Drake
7	The Ginger Man	J. P. Donleavy
8	An Adult's Story	Robert Desmond
9	The Whip Angels	XXX (Dianne Bataille)
10	What Frank Harris Did Not Say	Alexander Trocchi
11	The Loins of Amon	Marcus Van Heller (John Stevenson)
12	The Chariot of Flesh	Malcolm Nesbit
13	The Sexual Life of Robinson Crusoe	Humphrey Richardson
14	White Thighs	Alexander Trocchi
15	Rogue Women	Nicholas Cutter
16	With Open Mouth	Marcus Van Heller (John Stevenson)
17	Fanny Hill	John Cleland
18	How to Do It	Gustav Landshot
19	Darling	Harriet Daimler
20	The Small Rooms of Paris	Ezra de Richarnaud
21	Until She Screams	Mason Hoffenberg
22	The Itch	Steven Hammer
23	Roman Orgy	Marcus Van Heller (John Stevenson)
24	Heaven, Hell and the Whore	Robert Desmond
25	Thongs	Alexander Trocchi
26	Who Pushed Paula?	Akbar Del Piombo
27	Skirts	Akbar Del Piombo
28	Sarabande for a Bitch	Mickey Dikes
29	Helen and Desire	Alexander Trocchi
30	Cruel Lips	Marcus Van Heller (John Stevenson)
31	Kama Houri	Ataullah Mardaan
32	The Pleasure Thieves	Harriet Daimler
33	Innocence	Harriet Daimler
34	Cosimo's Wife	Akbar Del Piombo
35	The Wantons	Marcus Van Heller (John Stevenson)
36	Our Lady of the Flowers	Jean Genet
37	The House of Borgia	Marcus Van Heller (John Stevenson)
38	Flesh and Blood	Anna Winter
39	Sexus	Henry Miller
40	The Organization	Harriet Daimler
41	A Gallery of Nudes	Hume Parkinson
42	Deva Dasi	Ataullah Mardaan
43	The Double Bellied Companio	Akbar Del Piombo
44	The Story of O	Pauline Reage
45	Pearls of the Rainbow	Robert Desmond
46	Sin For Breakfast	Hamilton Drake
47	The World of Sex	Henry Miller
48	Sodom, or the Quintessence of Debauchery	John Wilmot
49	The Bedroom Philosophers	D.A.F. de Sade (Marquis de Sade)
50	120 Days of Sodom	Marquis de Sade
51	The White Book	Jean Cocteau
52	Juliette, Part 1	Marquis de Sade
53	Juliette, Part 2	Marquis de Sade
54	Juliette, Part 3	Marquis de Sade
55	Juliette, Part 4	Marquis de Sade
56	Juliette, Part 5	Marquis de Sade
57	Juliette, Part 6	Marquis de Sade
58	Juliette, Part 7	Marquis de Sade
59	Dissolving	Tim Harrack
60	I Hear Voices	Paul Ableman
61	The Woman Thing	Harriet Daimler
62	Teleny	Oscar Wilde
63	The Gaudy Image	William Talsman
64	Candy	Maxwell Kenton (Terry Southern and Mason Hoffenberg)
65	Classical Hindu Erotology	Ram Krishnanada
66	Lolita	Vladimir Nabokov
67	Justine	Marquis de Sade
68	Plexus	Henry Miller
69	The Watcher and The Watched	Thomas Peachum
70	Two Novels: The Amorous Exploits of a Young Rakehell; The Debauched Hospodar	Guillaume Apollinaire
71	Molloy; Malone Dies; The Unnamable	Samuel Beckett
73	The Fetish Crowd	Akbar Del Piombo
74	Zazie dans le Metro	Raymond Queneau
75	Houses of Joy	Wu Wu Ming (Sinclair Beiles)
76	Naked Lunch	William S. Burroughs
77	The Black Book	Lawrence Durrell
78	The Thief's Journal	Jean Genet
79	Fuzz Against Junk: The Saga of the Narcotics Brigade, and, The Hero Maker	Akbar Del Piombo
80	The Young and Evil	Charles Henri Ford
81	Night	Francis Pollini
82	The Hero Maker	Akbar Del Piombo
83	Steiner's Tour	Phillip O'Connor
84	Pleasures and Follies of a Good-Natured Libertine	Restif de la Bretonne
85	The American Express	Gregory Corso
86	The Shy Photographer	Jock Carroll
87	Pinktoes	Chester Himes
88	The Soft Machine	William S. Burroughs
89	Stradella	James Sherwood
90	A Bedside Odyssey	Homer & Associates (Michael Gall)
91	The Ticket That Exploded	William S. Burroughs
92	Busy Bodies	Ed Martin
93	Murder vs. Murder: The British Legal System and the A.6 Murder Case	Jean. [from old catalog] Justice
94	Sextet	J. Hume Parkinson
101	Stradella	James Sherwood
102	I Hear Voices	Paul Ableman
104	The Gaudy Image	William Talsman
105	The Story of Venus and Tannhauser	Aubrey Beardsley
107	The Best of 'Olympia': An Anthology	Maurice Girodias
108	The Fifth Volume of Frank Harris's My Life and Loves: An Irreverent Treatment	Alexander Trocchi
109	Young Adam	Alexander Trocchi
112	Night	Francis Pollini
114	Junky	William S. Burroughs
115	Gordon	Louise Walbrook (Edith Templeton)
205	The Sexual Life of Robinson Crusoe	Humphrey Richardson
206	A Bedside Odyssey	Gerald Williams
210	Sin for Breakfast	Mason Hoffenberg
214	My Mother Taught Me	Tor Kung
301	The Watcher and the Watched	Thomas Peachum
429	Crazy Wild Breaks Loose	Jett Sage
434	Bishop's Gambol	Roger Agile
440	Frankenstein '69	Ed Martin
450	Acid Temple Ball	Mary Sativa
456	A Satyr's Romance	Barry N. Malzberg
465	Sookey	Angelo D'Arcangelo
467	Thrust	C.S. Vanek
470	Jyros	J. Joth
505	Run Little Leather Boy	Larry Townsend
2218	The Organization	Harriet Daimler
2220	Whip Angels	Selena Warfield (Dianne Bataille)
