= Gerald Hanley =

Irish novelist and travel writer

Gerald Hanley (17 February 1916 – 7 September 1992) was an Irish novelist and travel writer and was born in Liverpool to Irish parents. Hanley's novels reflect his experiences of living in Africa, Burma, and the Indian sub-continent, as well as his life as a soldier. His first book, Monsoon Victory was published in 1946, and his last novel, Noble Descents in 1982.

== Biography ==
Hanley, born on 17 February 1916 in Liverpool (not County Cork, Ireland, as he claimed), was the youngest of a large, Irish-Liverpudleian Catholic family. Both his working-class parents were from Ireland: his father, Edward, from Dublin, his mother, Bridget, from Cobh, County Cork, but they were married in Liverpool in 1891. His father, Edward, was a seaman, especially on Cunard liners, but he also sometimes worked on shore.

In 1934 Gerald went to East Africa, where he worked on a farm in Kenya until the war in 1939. This was arranged with the help of his brother James' friend John Cowper Powys, whose brother William farmed in Kenya.

Joining the King's African Rifles of the British army on the outbreak of the Second World War, Hanley served in Somalia and in Burma, where Monsoon Victory (1946) is set. Prior to this, he had had a few short stories published. While he published a number of novels, he also wrote radio plays for the BBC as well as some film scripts, most notably The Blue Max (1966). He was also one of several scriptwriters for a life of Gandhi (1964). Parts of his script were used for the Richard Attenborough film Gandhi (see Attenborough's book on the subject).

In 1950, Hanley went to the Punjab in India, and he also lived in Srinagar, Pakistan, where he was married to Asha Weymiss, a Brahmin woman who had been adopted as a child by an English woman working in India. He settled in County Wicklow, Ireland, in 1954 with his first wife, Diana Fittall (some sources give a later date). He is survived by 7 children with Diana and two with Asha.

His brother was the novelist and playwright James Hanley, while the American novelist and playwright William Hanley was his nephew. William's sister, Ellen Hanley was a successful Broadway actress. Gerald Hanley died on 7 September 1992, in Dun Laoghaire, Ireland.

== Works ==
Gerald Hanley's novels reflect his experiences of living in Africa, both Kenya and Somalia, as well as in Burma and the Indian sub-continent, and of seeing the "influence of the British in the most distant parts of the world", as well as his life as a soldier.

Hanley's first book, Monsoon Victory (1946), is an account of the 1944 Burma campaign, from the point of view of a war correspondent. The Consul at Sunset (1951), The Year of the Lion (1953) and Drinkers of Darkness (1955) have for their background the life of expatriates in Kenya, as the British Empire declines. Warriors and Strangers (1971), a mixture of autobiography and travel writing, again has Africa as its setting.

Not all of Gerald Hanley's novels, however, deal with war and empire. For example, Without Love is set in present-day Barcelona, and its protagonist is the seedy son of a London-Irish family, who is an executioner for Russia's secret police.

The Journey Homeward (1961), along with Hanley's last novel, Noble Descents (1982), is set in India. Henry Hathaway's 1967 movie The Last Safari, starring Stewart Granger and Gabriella Licudi, was based on Gilligan's Last Elephant. Noble Descents is set six years after independence, and concerns a friendship between an Indian maharajah and an Englishman.

== Reputation ==
An abridged version of The Year of the Lion was broadcast by the BBC, in twelve parts, in 1984. Admired by Hemingway and compared to Conrad, Gerald Hanley, overshadowed by both Paul Scott and, to a lesser degree, his brother James Hanley, failed to achieve any lasting fame. Sinclair-Stevenson, in his obituary, suggests that the success of The Consul at Sunset, in 1951, was a factor in this: "Nothing after seemed to them to indicate progress or a new dimension." His stance against colonialism certainly didn't help his cause at the time.

== Bibliography ==
- Monsoon Victory. Collins, London, 1946
- The Consul at Sunset. Collins, London, 1951
- The Year of the Lion. Collins, London, 1953
- Drinkers of Darkness. Collins, London,1955
- Without Love. Collins, London, 1957
- The Journey Homeward. Collins, London, 1961
- "A Departure", The London Magazine, Vol. 1 No. 3, June 1961
- A Voice from the Top. A dialogue for Radio (broadcast July 1961)
- Gilligan's Last Elephant. Collins, London, 1962
- See You in Yasukuni. Collins, London, 1969
- Warriors and Strangers. Hamish Hamilton, London, 1971 (The first half, Warriors, was reprinted separately by Eland in 1993; new edition 2004)
- Noble Descents. Hamish Hamilton, London, 1982
