= Michael Gothard =

English actor (1939–1992)

- as Emile Locque in For Your Eyes Only, 1981
- Born: Michael Alan Gothard; 24 June 1939; London, England
- Died: 2 December 1992 (aged 53); Hampstead, London, England
- Occupation: Actor
- Years active: 1961–1992

Michael Alan Gothard (24 June 1939 – 2 December 1992) was an English actor, known for his roles as Father Barre in the film The Devils (1971); Kai in the television series Arthur of the Britons; assassin John Felton in The Three Musketeers (1973) and The Four Musketeers (1974); and the mysterious villain Emile Leopold Locque in the 1981 James Bond film For Your Eyes Only.

== Early life ==
Michael Gothard was born in London in 1939. As a child, he lived in both Wales and London. After leaving Haverstock School, he travelled in France for several months before returning home. He went through various jobs, including building labourer and trainee reporter. He had a brief spell as a clothes model, but didn't feel comfortable doing that job. He said: "I was as stiff as a board and I couldn’t overcome my sense of the ridiculous. I was a clothes hanger, an object, not a person."

== Career ==
Gothard joined the New Arts Theatre as a scenery mover, and became part of an amateur film a friend was making. After landing the lead role, he was encouraged to take up the profession. He attended evening classes at an actors' workshop whilst holding down a day job. He was involved in some of the first "Lunchtime theatre" productions in the 1960s, from pub cellars to top floor spaces off St. Martin's Lane. His first television role was in an episode of Out of the Unknown in 1966 called "The Machine Stops". He was then cast in Don Levy's film Herostratus in 1967 and Up the Junction in 1968. He then acquired a female following after taking a role as the villainous Mordaunt in the BBC's adaptation of Twenty Years After (Further Adventures of the Musketeers).

His performance as the nightclubbing killer Keith in Scream and Scream Again, directed by Gordon Hessler, was a break-out role for him, giving him exposure and leading to other, more prominent parts. In the film, Keith makes one of the most memorable escapes (in an Austin-Healey car) from the police ever seen. The film's main stars were Vincent Price, Peter Cushing and Christopher Lee. Executive producer Louis M. Heyward said of Gothard's performance: "I felt that Michael Gothard was going to be the biggest thing that ever happened. He had that insane look and that drive, and he was wonderful. Here is a kid who really threw himself into the picture wholeheartedly. Do you remember the scene where he appears to be walking up the cliff? That's a stunt that, as an actor, I would not have agreed to; I’d say, 'Hey, get a double or get a dummy. I ain't either one.' But the kid agreed to do it, without a double—he was that driven. He had a lot of class and a lot of style. Gordon (Hessler) came up with the idea of using an overhead cable to give that illusion of his walking up the cliff."

He appeared in Ken Russell's 1971 film, The Devils, in which Gothard had a stand-out role as fanatic witch-hunter and exorcist Father Barre, who defiles Vanessa Redgrave and tortures Oliver Reed. His performance as a young disillusioned hippie in Barbet Schroeder's La Vallée (1972) contrasted with the rest of his career. He also played a fictionalised version of the 17th century assassin John Felton in Richard Lester's 1973 film of The Three Musketeers and its 1974 sequel, The Four Musketeers.

He had a regular role as Kai opposite Oliver Tobias's King Arthur on the aforementioned Arthur of the Britons during the early 1970s. He became known to a wider cinema audience for his menacing turn as the villainous (and non-speaking) Belgian henchman, Emile Leopold Locque, in the 1981 James Bond film, For Your Eyes Only. Gothard was actually the one who suggested Locque's signature octagonal glasses in an effort to make the character more menacing. His later appearances included supporting roles in Tobe Hooper's 1985 science-fiction horror extravaganza, Lifeforce, and as George Lusk in the 1988 TV movie, Jack the Ripper, with Michael Caine. He appeared with Dean Stockwell and Shirley Knight in a Hammer House of Mystery and Suspense (a.k.a. Fox Mystery Theatre) episode, "The Sweet Scent of Death".

One of Gothard's last important appearances was in 1992's Christopher Columbus: The Discovery, which reunited him his James Bond director John Glen (director).

His final role was in David Wickes's Frankenstein, starring Patrick Bergin and Randy Quaid.

== Personal life ==
Gothard experienced depression for much of his life.

== Death ==
Gothard died on 2 December 1992 at the age of 53. The cause of death was suicide.

== Filmography ==
=== Film ===
- Herostratus (1967) as Max
- Up the Junction (1968) as Terry
- Michael Kohlhaas-Der Rebell (1969) as John
- Scream and Scream Again (1970) as Keith
- The Last Valley (1971) as Hansen
- The Devils (1971) as Father Barre
- Whoever Slew Auntie Roo? (1971) as Albie
- La Vallée (1972) as Olivier
- The Three Musketeers (1973) as John Felton
- The Four Musketeers (1974) as John Felton
- King Arthur, the Young Warlord (1975) as Kai
- Warlords of Atlantis (1978) as Atmir
- For Your Eyes Only (1981) as Emile Leopold Locque
- Lifeforce (1985) as Dr Bukovsky
- Going Undercover (1988) (a.k.a. Yellow Pages) as Strett
- Gioco al massacro (1989) as Zabo
- Destroying Angel (1990) as "the Hitman"
- The Serpent of Death (1990) as Xaros
- Christopher Columbus: The Discovery (1992) as Inquisitor's Spy
- Frankenstein (1992) as Boatswain (final film role)

=== Television ===
- Out of the Unknown (1966) as Kuno, in "The Machine Stops"
- Thirty-Minute Theatre (1966) as Grady, in "The Excavation"
- The Further Adventures of the Three Musketeers (1967) as Mordaunt
- Armchair Theatre (1969) as Brian, in "The Story-Teller"
- Fraud Squad (1969) as Jacky Joyce, in "Run For Your Money"
- Department S (1969) as Weber, in "Les Fleurs du Mal"
- Randall and Hopkirk (1970) as Perrin, in "When the Spirit Moves You"
- Paul Temple (1970) as Ivan, in "Games People Play"
- Menace (1970) as Pip, in "Nine Bean Rows"
- Arthur of the Britons (1972–1973) as Kai
- Warrior Queen (1978) as Volthan
- The Professionals (1979) as Kodai, in "Stopover"
- A Tale of Two Cities (1980) (Michael E. Briant version) as Gaspard
- Shoestring (1981) as Harry, in "The Mayfly Dance"
- ITV Playhouse (1981) as Dieter, in "The Perfect House"
- Ivanhoe (1982) as Athelstane
- Hammer House of Mystery and Suspense (1984) as Terry Marvin, in "The Sweet Scent of Death"
- Scarecrow and Mrs. King (1984) as Karl Portillo, in "Our Man in Tegernsee"
- Lytton's Diary (1985) as Jake Cutler, in "Daddy's Girls"
- Minder (1985) as Sergei, in "From Fulham, With Love"
- Jack the Ripper (1988) as George Lusk
- Capital City (1989) as Stefan in "Twelve Degrees Capricorn"
