= Ellen Hanley =

American actress

- Publicity Photo of Ellen Hanley
- Born: May 15, 1926; Lorain, Ohio
- Died: February 12, 2007 (aged 80); Norwalk, Connecticut
- Occupations: Actress, singer
- Spouse: Ronny Graham (1951-1963; divorced)

Ellen Hanley (May 15, 1926 – February 12, 2007) was a musical theater performer best known for playing Fiorello H. LaGuardia's first wife in the Pulitzer Prize-winning Fiorello!. She was related to the British writers James and Gerald Hanley, and the playwright, novelist, and scriptwriter William Hanley was her brother.

== Early life ==
Ellen Hanley was born in Lorain, Ohio, one of three children of William Gerald and Anne (Rodgers) Hanley. William Hanley, Sr. was born in Liverpool, England in 1899, of Irish Catholic immigrants. He was a seaman prior to settling in the US, and then worked as a housepainter.

== Career ==
Ellen Hanley made her Broadway debut in Annie Get Your Gun in 1946 playing the part of Mary. The following year she appeared in Barefoot Boy With Cheek and won a Theater World award for her performance as Clothilde Pfefferkorn. in the late 1940s and 1950s she "toured extensively in summer-stock shows" and also during the 1950s performed in Julius Monk's revues.

In 1952 she had a part in the musical revue Two's Company, introducing the song "Roundabout". In 1959 she took over the leading role in First Impressions from Polly Bergen, playing Elizabeth Bennett in a musical based on Pride and Prejudice. She is best-known for playing Thea, Fiorello LaGuardia's first wife, in the Pulitzer Prize-winning in Fiorello!, the Jerry Bock-Sheldon Harnick musical hit which ran for nearly 800 performances, from late 1959. She acted, in 1963, in a successful off-Broadway revival of The Boys From Syracuse, a Richard Rodgers-Lorenz Hart musical based on Shakespeare's The Comedy of Errors.

== Personal life ==
In 1951, Hanley married Ronny Graham, a fellow actor. They adopted two children, Nora and Julian. The couple divorced in 1963.

== Death ==
Hanley died on February 12, 2007, aged 80, in Norwalk, Connecticut, of a stroke after a long battle with cancer.

== Appearances ==
- Annie Get Your Gun (1946-1949) as Mary
- Barefoot Boy with Cheek (1947) as Clothilde Pfefferkorn
- Two's Company (1952–1953)
- First Impressions (1959) as Elizabeth Bennett
- Fiorello! (1959–1961) as Thea
- The Boys from Syracuse (1963)
- The Burns and Allen Show: Episode 3

== Awards ==
- Theatre World Award (1947) for Clothilde Pfefferkorn in Barefoot Boy With Cheek.
