= Boy (novel) =

1931 novel by James Hanley

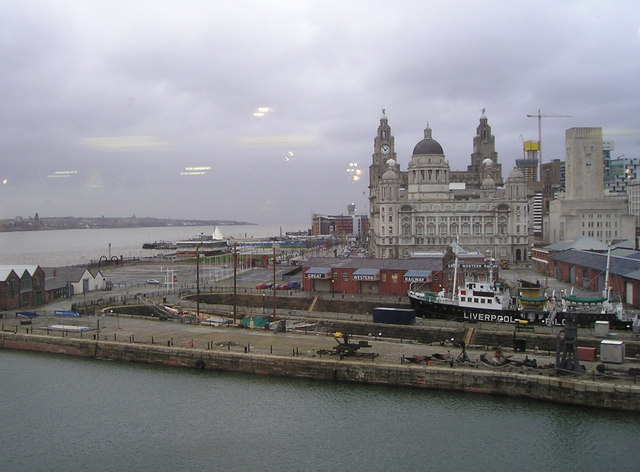
- Docks and River Mersey, Liverpool
- Author: James Hanley
- Language: English
- Genre: Novel
- Published: 1931
- Publisher: Boriswood
- Media type: Print
- Preceded by: Drift (1930)
- Followed by: Ebb and Flood (1932)

Boy, James Hanley's second novel, first published in 1931 by Boriswood, is a grim story of the brief life and early death of a thirteen-year-old stowaway from Liverpool. After several editions had been published in 1931 and 1932, a cheap edition, published in 1934, was prosecuted for obscene libel and the publisher heavily fined.

== Plot summary ==
Boy is the grim story of an intelligent thirteen-year-old boy, Fearon, from Liverpool who is forced to leave school by his parents so as to help support the family, by working "on the docks as a boiler-scaler". Hating this job and after being beaten by his father, Fearon stows away on a ship. When he is discovered, as the ship is shorthanded, he is signed-on to the crew. Fearon's suffering continues on board where he is sexually assaulted. When the ship docks in Alexandria, Egypt, Fearon has his first sexual encounter with a woman, in a brothel, where he contracts syphilis. On the return voyage this disease rapidly develops. The novel concludes with the captain smothering Fearon to put him out of his misery and his body given to the sea.

== History ==
Boy, James Hanley's second novel, his "first novel of the sea", was first published by Boriswood as a limited edition of 145 and "a public edition which, of regretful necessity, has been somewhat expurgated", in September 1931 (asterisks indicated where "words, phrases and sentences [were] omitted"). There were several subsequent editions in Britain and America. Hanley had originally intended to include Boy in the collection of stories and novellas, Men in Darkness: Five Stories, which was published in September 1931, at the same time as Boy.

Novelist Hugh Walpole, in a review, described Boy as "A novel that is so unpleasant and ugly, both in narration and in incident, that I wonder the printers did not go on strike while printing it". T. E. Lawrence (Lawrence of Arabia), however, had a very different opinion, and, in a letter to Hanley in 1931, commented "Your character drawing is superb, here and in Boy and in The Last Voyage, and Drift ... You can draw characters as and when you please, with an almost blistering vividness".

Then, when it was reprinted in 1934, in a cheap (second) edition with a "scantily dressed" belly dancer on its cover, Boy was prosecuted for obscenity. The court case followed a complaint to the police by someone who had borrowed the novel from The National Library, in Bury, near Manchester, Lancashire: "The prosecution suggested that the cover of the book and extracts from reviews just inside were most suggestive, and that the purpose was to pollute young people's minds". Boriswood "were advised that, owing to the book's reference to 'intimacy between members of the male sex', any defence against prosecution was futile'". In March 1935 Boriswood pleaded guilty of "uttering and publishing an obscene libel" and paid a substantial fine.

Subsequently Boy was republished, by the Obelisk Press in Paris, in 1936, 1938 and 1946. Jack Kahane was a noted publisher of banned books in English, including Henry Miller's Tropic of Cancer and Lady Chatterley's Lover. However, it appears that Hanley did not agree to the republishing in Paris, and that only Boriswood received royalties. Furthermore, according to Hanley's son Liam, his father "firmly rejected" any "overtures from publishers to reissue Boy during his lifetime.

The novel was, however, reprinted after Hanley's death, in the 1990s by André Deutsch and Penguin Books, with an introduction by Anthony Burgess and more recently in 2007 by Oneworld Classics. Also a dramatised version of Boy was broadcast on BBC Radio 3's "Sunday Play" on March 16, 1996.

=== Publishing history ===
- 1st edition. A limited edition of 145 copies, along with an expurgated, trade edition, Boriswood, London, October 1931.
- Ist edition, second impression, December 1931.
- 1st edition, third impression, January 1932.
- Ist American edition, Alfred A Knopf, April 1932.
- 1st American edition, second printing May 1932.
- 2nd British edition (cheap edition), May 1934 Prosecuted as an obscene libel and withdrawn January 1935.
- Obelisk Press edition (published in Paris by Jack Kahane) 1936.
- Obelisk Press edition, 1938.
- Obelisk Press edition, 1946.
- André Deutsch, 1990 reprint, with an introduction by Anthony Burgess.
- Penguin Books, 1992. The Deutsch edition republished in paperback.
- Oneworld Classics edition, 2007.

== Autobiography? ==
The New York Times, in Hanley's "Obituary", described Boy as "Mr. Hanley's partly autobiographical novel". However, Hanley did not run away to sea when he was thirteen but worked as a clerk for four years, before signing on as an ordinary seaman on SS Nitonian, when he was seventeen. According to Hanley's son Liam, his father laughed at the suggestion that Boy was autobiographical. Hanley refers to Boy, though not naming it, in "a short reminiscence entitled 'Oddfish', " in his collection of essays and sketches Don Quixote Drowned (1953). In this essay Hanley describes "how a young seaman overhears a conversation on the bridge of a ship, from which emerges ... the central figure" of the novel.

== See also ==
- James Hanley: The Furys Chronicle
