= The Furys Chronicle =

Novel series by James Hanley

The Furys Chronicle is a sequence of five novels, published between 1935 and 1958, by James Hanley (1897–1985). The main setting is the fictional, northern, English town of Gelton, which is based on Liverpool, where Hanley was born, and involves an Irish Catholic family of seafarers, similar to Hanley's own. The action takes place between 1911 and 1927. The first novel in the series, The Furys, was Hanley's sixth novel.

== History ==
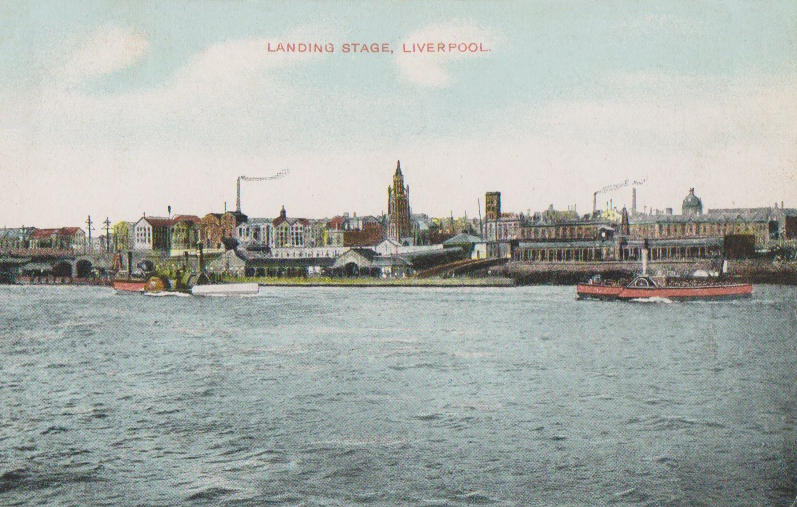
Liverpool in 1907. The Furys takes place in 1911

Originally conceived as a trilogy, this sequence of five novels by the Liverpool born writer of Irish descent, James Hanley, chronicles the lives of the Furys, an Irish immigrant family, in the fictional northern English town of Gelton "a fictional counterpart of Liverpool". These novels were published over a period of more than twenty years (1935–1958) and cover the period from 1911 until 1927. The series is based on Hanley's own experiences of growing up a Catholic of Irish descent in a city divided by sectarian tensions. The father, Denny (Dennis) Fury, had been a stoker on ships, as had Hanley's father. Both Hanley's parents were born in Ireland, his father Edward Hanley in Dublin, like Denny Fury, and his mother, Bridget Roache, in County Cork, like Fanny Fury.

Hanley was fourteen in 1911 so that would have been around the time he left school and started work as a clerk.

With regard to the family's name "Fury", John Fordham suggests, that "Hanley was aware of the classical allusion", and, that "[w]hile there are no exact parallels with Aeschylus, the novel consistently evokes the Oresteian original": "The Furys, like the house of Atreus, are accursed, symbolic of a once proud family or nation"

=== Volume 1: The Furys (1935) ===
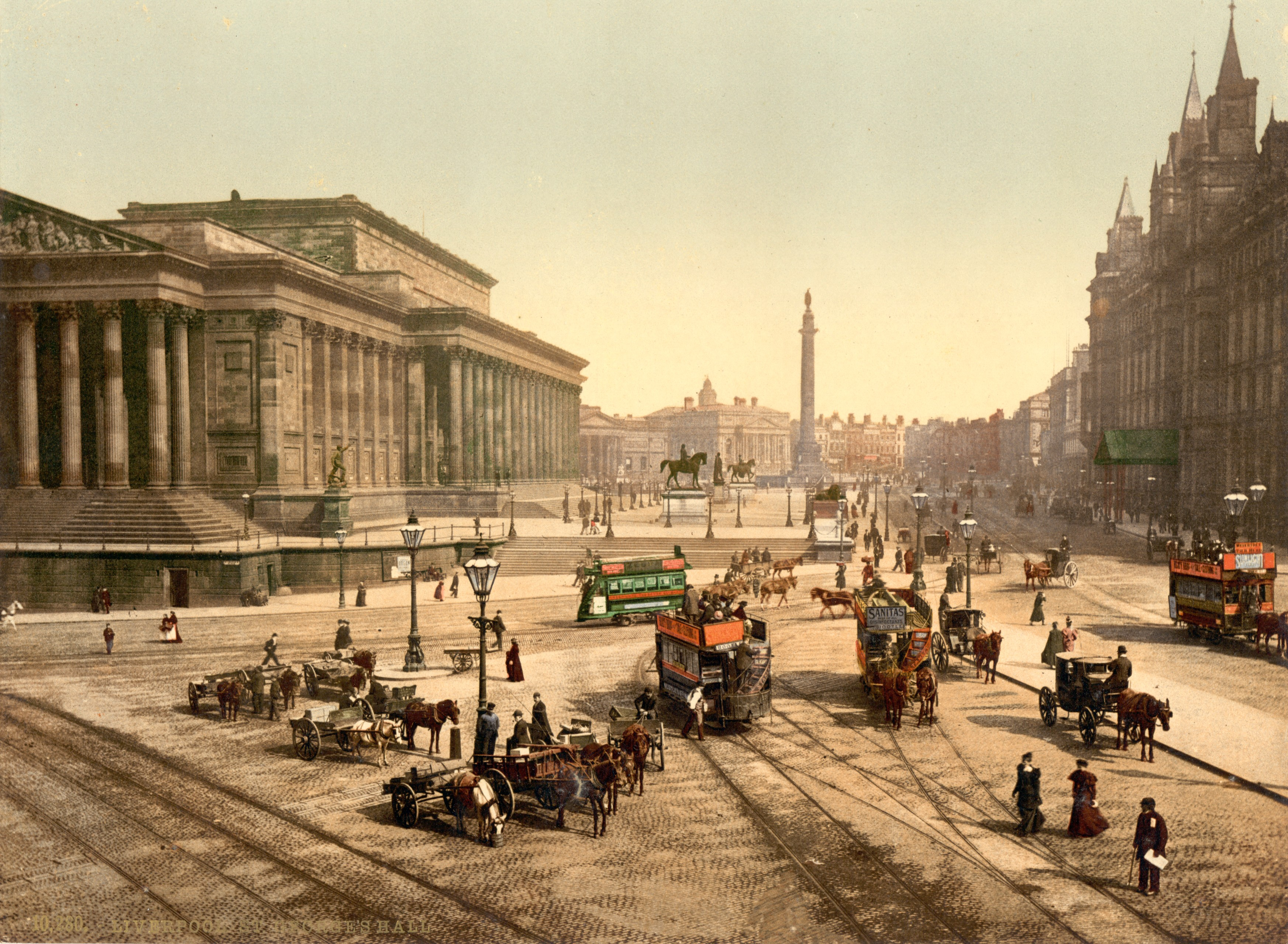
Liverpool in the 1890s. The Plateau, St George's Hall, where the 1911 riot took place. St George's Hall, Liverpool to the left, Great North Western Hotel to the right.

No date is given, but the action takes place over three or four weeks a few years before World War I. The strike that takes place in the novel, with its accompanying scenes of violence, appears to be based on the 1911 Liverpool general transport strike, also known as the '"great transport workers' strike", which involved dockers, railway workers and sailors, as well people from other trades. This paralysed Liverpool commerce for most of that summer.

The editors of the Penguin Twentieth-Century Classics edition of The Furys, and some critics, confuse the strike that occurs in the novel with the 1926 General Strike. The third novel in the series, Our Time is Gone, is set during World War I.

At the centre of the novel is the figure of Fanny Fury and the conflicts within the Fury family that have been caused by her proud, domineering personality. Fanny no longer has anything to do with two of her children, Desmond and Maureen, both of whom in their restless ambition resemble her. Desmond because he married a Protestant and has abandoned his Catholic faith. Desmond is ruthlessly determined to get ahead and works as a union organiser. Fanny Fury objects to Maureen's marriage to the much older man, Joe Kilkey, who Maureen only married to get away from her mother.

Her family also hate how she privileged the youngest child Peter by sending him to a Catholic seminary in Cork. Ireland, when he was eight, so that he could become a priest. This was his mother Fanny Furys' dream and Peter's schooling represents a significant sacrifice for the Fury family, who live in the slums of Gelton (Liverpool). Like James Joyce's Stephen Daedalus, in Portrait of the Artist as a Young Man, and Joe Rourke in Hanley's first novel Drift, Peter Fury rebel against his strict Roman Catholic upbringing, and a major event of the novel is Peter's return from Ireland in disgrace, after having been expelled for visiting a brothel. Peter is accompanied by Fanny's sister Brigid Managuan, who has remained at home in Cork, Ireland and never married. Peter is now sixteen and, soon after he returns, has an affair with his brother Desmond's wife, who is rumoured to be a prostitute.

The 1911 strike provides a violent backdrop to the family conflict, and the working class is not presented as "the hope for the future" in this novel, but as "an undisciplined and purposeless mass". The oldest son Desmond is directly involved with the strike because he is a union organizer, and during the riot he is involved in a violent altercation with a mounted policeman.

During the strike Peter has a strange encounter with the Mephistophelian, homosexual Professor Titmouse, who sensing Peter's "fascination with the sights and sounds of the riots [...] lures him into the central square". Titmouse represents a cynical view of the motives that lead to the riot, yet Stokes suggests that "through his lunatic rhetoric is somewhat equivocally conveyed what one assumes to be Hanley's own view". Peter, together with his sister-in-law Sheila, is later again drawn to a scene of violence, and she's is showered with blood when a young man standing next to her is shot.

The fact that Denny Fury goes on strike, combined with unpaid fees for Peter's schooling creates a financial crisis for Fanny Fury, and causes her to first sell furniture and steal her husband's savings, and then leads her to having to borrow money at an exorbitant rate of interest from the money lender Mrs Ragner, with whom her daughter Maureen already has an account. Joe Kilkey, who is a good Catholic agrees to stand surety for the loan, despite his wife's objection. It appears that Fanny's father, Anthony Mangan, had earlier helped finance Peter's schooling. Anthony Mangan has suffered a stroke and his silent, paralysed body, bound to a chair, dominates the Fury household.

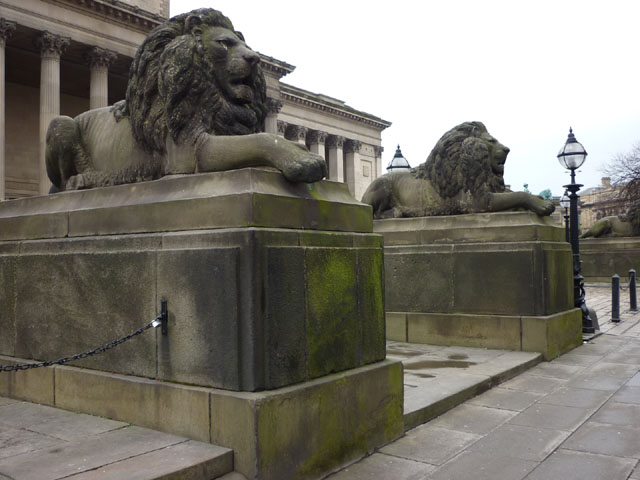
Stone lions guarding, The Plateau, St George's Hall, Liverpool, Peter Fury and Professor Titmouse watch the riot from the back of one of these lions

The conclusion of the novel has Peter leaving to become a sailor. But just before he joins his ship, two photos of Sheila fall from his pocket, confirming his mother's suspicion, and Fanny Fury violently attacks her son both verbally and physically.

The novel received "a mixed reception from reviewers in both" Britain and the United States and "some thought it one of the most important novels in several years". It was particularly criticized for being "shapeless". In partial defence Edward Stokes, in The Novels of James Hanley, argues that The Fury, is "a prologue or overture" to a trilogy. It was dramatized for radio and broadcast on BBC Radio 4 FM, 2 March 2001.

==== 1911 Liverpool general transport strike ====
The strike of 1911 transformed trade unionism on Merseyside. For the first time, general trade unions were able to establish themselves on a permanent footing and become genuine mass organisations of the working class. Strike action began on 14 June when the National Sailors' and Firemen's Union announced a nationwide merchant seamen's strike. Solidarity action in support of the seamen led to other sections of workers coming out on strike. A strike committee – chaired by syndicalist Tom Mann – was formed to represent all the workers in dispute. Many meetings were held on St. George's Plateau, next to St. George's Hall on Lime Street, including the rally on 13 August where police baton charged a crowd of 85,000 people, who had gathered to hear Tom Mann speak. This became known as "Bloody Sunday". In the police charges and subsequent unrest that carried on through the following night, over 350 people were injured. 3,500 British troops were stationed in the city by this time. Two days later, soldiers of the 18th Hussars opened fire on a crowd on Vauxhall Road, injuring fifteen, two fatally: John Sutcliffe, a 19-year-old Catholic carter, was shot twice in the head, and Michael Prendergast, a 30-year-old Catholic docker, was shot twice in the chest. An inquest into their deaths later brought in a verdict of 'justifiable homicide'. Home Secretary Winston Churchill sent in troops and positioned the cruiser HMS Antrim in the Mersey.

=== Volume 2: The Secret Journey (1936) ===
Takes place a year later, over about a month in 1912. when Peter Fury has just returned from his first voyage. There are several plot-lines, including Peter Fury's affair with Sheila, his brother Desmond's wife, the break-up Maureen's marriage to Joe Kilkey, and the return of Anthony Mangan to Ireland. However, the main story involves Fanny Fury's growing indebtedness to the moneylender Anna Ragner, because she is unable to meet her monthly payments and has to take out additional loans. Critic Edward Stokes argues that this novel "has more shape than The Furys," because it focusses on this story. He also describes A Secret Journey as a "strange and lurid a world in which characters loom out of the mist, portentous and larger-than-life".

Peter Fury has been persuaded to take a shore job on the railway by his mother, but this leads to tension between him and his father – because Denny Fury is aware of the adulterous affair, as indeed is Fanny – and Denny Fury goes back to sea. When another son Anthony arrives home, Fanny tries to persuade him to take a shore job, so that there will still be some semblance of family life. She is struggling against a growing sense of loneliness.

Because Fanny sends Peter to Mrs Ragner as her go-between, he learns of the debt, and realises how much his education in Ireland contributed to this situation. Furthermore, Mrs Ragner falls in love with Peter and pays him for sexual favours. Peter is flattered by having two women interested in him, though Mrs Ragner also disgusts him, but because of her interest in Peter Mrs Ragner does not foreclose on his mother, to the disgust of her factotum Daniel Corkran.

Another important plot-line involves the relation of Maureen's relationship with the much-older Joe Kilkey, who she only married so as to get away from her mother. Joe stood surety for Fanny's loan and will not go back on his promise, though Maureen tells him that he should. This leads Maureen to try and raise money. When her brother Desmond refuses, it appears that she went to her former foreman at the jute factory, where she had worked, and somehow obtained the money. This leads to a break-up of what was already a shaky marriage, and Maureen abandons her husband and baby son.

Fanny Fury is changing and struggling to cope, and when her sister Brigid Managan comes from Ireland with plans to take their paralysed father, Anthony Mangan, back to Cork she surprisingly agrees. Brigid believes that he has money. Soon after she gets back to Cork she takes him to Lourdes, France, seeking a miracle cure, so that he will regain his speech and reveal where his money is.

Anna Ragner learns from Corkran about Peter and Sheila and realises that Peter hates her like everyone else does. She now demands full payment from Fanny Fury, who she hates because Mrs Fury does not cringe before her like everyone else does. After his mother Peter is the one most disturbed by events, and he leaves work at lunchtime because he cannot concentrate. His relationship with Sheila has deteriorated, and just after leaving work he sees her going into a hotel, where she meets a business man. He then realises that she is a prostitute. This further increase Peter's emotional turmoil, and eventually, late at night, he manages to get into Anna Ragner's house, where her, in a crazed state, he murders. The novel ends with Peter, covered in blood, being pursued by a mob across Gelton and then arriving him deliriously proclaiming that they are now "free".

John Fordham notes a parallel between Peter Fury's murder of Anna Ragner and Raskolnikov's murder of the money lender in Dostoevsky's Crime and Punishment. He also sees in the murder "an evident desire for social as well as familial vengeance, since Mrs Ragner's power is directly linked to the economic oppression of Gelton's working class".

=== Volume 3. Our Time is Gone (1940) ===
Takes place during the middle of the First World War, "Parts I and II [...] in November and December 1915, Part III in August and September 1916", and was originally intended to be the final part of a trilogy. The father Denny Fury has returned to the sea, "as a stoker on a liner that has been taken over as a troopship," and Desmond Fury is a captain in the army, and has moved with his wife Sheila to London. Peter Fury is serving a fifteen-year prison sentence for his murder of Mrs Ragner. At the beginning of the novel Fanny Fury has suffered a nervous breakdown because of the murder, but after spending time in hospital she recovers. Fanny moves into a riverside slum to hide from those who know her and works as a cleaner on troop and hospital ships. She also visits Peter in prison. As the novel's title suggests, the main theme "is the disintegration and dispersal of the Fury family".

Our Time is Gone is noteworthy for the variety of settings it has, compared with the previous two Furys' novels, with more than a third set outside of Gelton: "in Slye's seedy lodgings in Blacks, in Desmond's London flat, 'in camp', in prison, on a ship at sea, [in Ireland], and on trains"

While John Fordham describes the novel as "formidable", Edward Stokes criticises the lack of connection between the various parts of the novel: that the three major characters, Mrs Fury, Desmond Fury, and Joe Kilkey exist "in his or her own world, which touches the others rarely or not at all.

In this novel more information is given about Sheila (Downey) Furys' mysterious past, "the decadent" family, her invalid, weepy mother, and "dissolute father", and the family's Irish estate which is "virtually derelict", that Desmond Fury visits.

Published in 1940, at the beginning of World War II, Our Time is Gone is concerned very much with "the devastating effect of the First World War upon the entire social range". John Fordham comments on the fact that Our Time is Gone "discloses a surprisingly non-belligerent tone for a Second World War novel" and the "unprecedented", for a novel published during a war, "central heroism of Joseph Kilkey" who is a conscientious objector. In addition to describing Joe Kilkey "languishing in prison", there are descriptions of Denny Fury struggling to save a young boy after his ship is torpedoed, and of Fanny Fury with an "army of scrubbing women, who endeavour to restore filthy, stinking troopships to some semblance of cleanliness and order". Hanley had himself both served in the merchant marine during World War I, and, later, had briefly fought in France with the Canadian Army. At the end of the novel it is presumed that Denny Fury drowned at sea.

Hanley had previously written about World War I in his novella The German Prisoner (1930), and novel The Hollow Sea (1938).

=== Volume 4. Winter Song (1950) ===
The action takes place over about a month, "apparently March", though it is not "certain whether the war is still on". " Winter Song is, as its title implies, a novel of old age". In the first part of the novel Denny Fury returns home, after having been presumed dead following the torpedoing of his ship. Fanny Fury believing herself widowed has retired to a Catholic hospice for the dying. Stokes comments that though it "runs to over 300 pages [...] its plot can be summarized in a few lines".

Denny Fury arrives back in Gelton with two, young drunken sailors, "who have dragged him have across the world", after being torpedoed, it turns out, twice, physically and mentally shattered, and without a home. Following the reunion of Denny and Fanny Fury they spend a few weeks with their son-in-law, Joe Kilkey, before returning to Ireland. However, prior to taking the Irish ferry, they both set out on a long train journey to visit Peter in prison in a place called Darnton. On the train they encounter a man who is going to the prison to help the hangman the next day. When they arrive at the station, however, Denny Fury suffers a physical collapse, and "[a]nother dream of Mrs Fury's is shattered" and they return to Gelton without seeing Peter. After retiring to the hospice Fanny had "lost all her imperiousness and resolution", but she quickly regains them in organising the trip to the prison and then to Ireland, despite Denny's misgivings, especially with living with Fanny's sister Brigid in Cork, with whom he has never got on.

The novel concludes with Fanny and Denny Fury arriving in Dublin, Ireland, where their seaman, son Anthony lives, on their way to Cork. John Fordham describes this final journey as a "journey to a country [Ireland] where the possibility of redemption from the postlapsian world of [Industrial England] still exists". Readers learn in the final Furys' novel, An End and a Beginning that Fanny Fury died after returning to Cork, when she her heart gave out when gunmen opened fire close by. After this happened Denny Fury never spoke again.

With regard to when the novel takes place there is, according to Stokes, "hopeless confusion. However, men are still returning from torpedoed ships at the beginning of the novel, and the gunmen, who cause Fanny Fury's heart attack – mentioned in An End and a Beginning – were probably engaged in the Irish War of Independence, which began January 1919 and ended with a truce in July 1921 (violence continued in Northern Ireland, and there was the subsequent Irish Civil War, June 1922 to May 1923). Fordham refers to an "act of Republican terrorism".

=== Volume 5. An End and a Beginning (1958) ===
Liverpool Prison in Walton, Liverpool, 1910. The prison in Winter Song, is in another town, but that in An End and a Beginning, which Peter leaves c.1927, is in Gelton (Liverpool).

The concluding novel takes place over roughly three weeks, presumably in 1927 or 1928, because "Peter Fury has just been released from prison after serving fifteen years for the murder he committed in 1912". This prison is in Gelton, whereas in Winter Song Peter's parents travel by train for several hours to a prison in the town of Darnton planning to visit him. Soon after leaving the prison, Peter travels to Cork, Ireland, where he visits the graves of his parents and his aunt Brigid Mangan, who is now senile and does not know him. He also learns that his mother died of a heart attack brought on by Irish Republican gunfire.

At the suggestion of his sister-in-law, and former lover, Sheila, Peter then goes to Rams Gate, Rath Na, the ancestral home of the Downeys – Sheila's family – where shortly afterwards she joined him. The house, run by the housekeeper Miss Fetch, has survived both the Irish war of independence of 1919–1921, and the Irish Civil War of 1922–1923, when many Anglo-Irish residences were burnt. Most of the action takes place in Ireland and it is Hanley's second novel set there, the first being Resurrexit Dominus (1934), that was published in a limited edition of 110 copies. There are also in The Secret Journey a couple of scenes in Cork, involving Brigid Mangan, and in Our Time is Gone Desmond Fury visits his wife's home Rams Gate, Rath Na.

Peter believes that Sheila comes home because of him, but in reality she has left her husband Desmond, and believes that she can find happiness again by bringing her father back to the family home and bringing the house back to life again.

During An End and a Beginning Peter Fury "relives many of the key elements of the [...] life of his family, through [...] flashbacks and interior monologues". However, the details of past events recorded here differ considerably from those given in earlier Furys novels, so much so the Edward Stokes suggests that the "novel is so different from its predecessors [...] that it is probably better to regard it as a completely independent novel". In the revised version of events told in An End and a Beginning, Peter came home several times from Clongowes College "whereas in The Furys he did not return home at all for seven years". Again, as told here, he was not expelled for immorality, but runs away because he has become aware of the cost of his education to his family. Another major difference is that, in the revised version of events told in this novel, Peter did not have an affair with Mrs Ragner, and she does not know him when he comes into her bedroom prior to killing her. There are other various other differences, including Fanny and Denny Fury arriving in Cork by ferry, whereas in Winter Song they arrive in Dublin, in order to visit their son Anthony's family, before travelling on to Cork.

There is also a different version of Sheila (Downey) Fury's past life. Whereas in The Furys her past is a mystery, about which her husband Desmond never questions her (neither does her lover Peter Fury), in An End and a Beginning, the reader learns that when she first met Desmond, she gave him a full account of past and family. Again here there is no mention of her being a prostitute, or that Peter in The Secret Journey had seen her with a businessman at a hotel.

Sheila restarts her affair with Peter, but this is only out of pity for him and the reader soon learns that she is still in love with Desmond, despite his unwillingness to start a family, and neglect of her in pursuit of ambition. She, therefore, gives up "her impossible dream" of regaining the happiness she remembers from her childhood in Ireland, returns to her husband in Gelton.

The housekeeper Miss Fetch is a third major character in this novel, according to Stokes "a remarkable creation". Born into an impoverished fisherman's family at sixteen she became a servant at the Downey's house, where Downey seduces her, and she falls in love with him. This was some forty years earlier. Subsequently, years later, she had a brief affair with the postman Cullen, who may have hoped to marry her. However, at the time of the novel, Miss Fetch is leading a contented life as a devout Catholic, sewing for the Church, and carefully maintaining the house, and her memories of the more lively past. The arrival of first the goal-bird Peter, and then Sheila, upset Miss Fetch's life of calm routine, and she is then given notice by Sheila. But, at the end of the novel, even though Sheila's brother sells the house to an order of Carmelite nuns, Miss Fetch retains her room in the house and on the novel's final page she kneels down by her bed "and thanked God for her great content".

While at Rams Gate an important event is Peter's encounter with Franciscan friars, and his telling the story of his life to one of the monks. Peter had thought earlier going to America, where there are relatives, and later thinks of returning to Gelton, but the novel ends with Peter contemplating joining a German merchant ship, where no one will know of his past, and sailing to South American. While Peter has by the end of the novel "managed to stagger a few paces along the road to freedom and independence" it is unclear what the future holds for him.

==== Themes ====
Edward Stokes suggests that "if the theme of the novel can be stated in one word, that word is "Imprisonment". Firstly Peter "remains imprisoned in the past–in the memory of his mother's destructive" plan for him to become a priest, and his memory of the happiness that he found in his affair with his sister-in-law Sheila. Sheila is herself "imprisoned in her love for Desmond [Fury]", while Miss Fetch "wants nothing except to be allowed to remain in the prison that she knows and loves", the deserted mansion of Rams Gate.

== Characters ==
- Mrs Fanny Fury – is the central character in all but An End and a Beginning, the final novel of the sequence. Fanny is a devout Catholic from a fishing village in Cork, Ireland. Her pride and manipulation of her children's lives causes much unhappiness. She also constantly complains about her husband's lack of ambition and has nothing to do with her children Desmond or Maureen. Fanny Fury gets herself into debt, and, at the end of The Secret Journey, is faced with having her furniture seized by Mrs Ragner. In Winter Song Fanny and Dennis Fury return to Cork, where they both die.
- Denis Fury – is a sailor, born in Dublin, who in The Furys is working ashore. In The Secret Journey he goes to sea again, because the tension at home, following Peter's return.
- Desmond Fury – the oldest son, who has abandoned his Catholic faith, and is determined to better himself, though his union activities. He becomes a Gelton town councillor and during World War I, in Our Time is Gone, he is a captain in the army.
- Sheila Downey – Desmond Fury's wife, whom he met while holidaying in Ireland. Little is initially learnt about her, but she comes from an Anglo-Irish family and there is a family home, Ra Nath, in Cork, where Peter Fury stays in An End and a Beginning. It appears that she is a prostitute and, at the end of The Secret Journey, Peter, with whom she has been having an affair, follows her to a hotel where she meets with a business man. In An End and a Beginning she and Peter Fury attempt to continue their earlier affair, but this is a failure and she returns to Desmond.
- Maureen Fury – she is ambitious, like her mother and brother Desmond, and leaves her husband Joe Kilkey and baby, in The Secret Journey.
- Joe Kilkey – is the husband of Maureen Fury, a good Catholic and a stevedore. He is very ugly and old enough to be her father, and Maureen only married him to escape her mother.
- John Fury – is a son who was killed in an accident.
- Anthony Fury – is another son who arrives home in The Secret Journey, after injuring himself by falling from a ship's mast onto his feet. His mother wants him to stay ashore, along with Peter, so that she can retain some semblance of family life.
- Peter Fury – is the youngest son, who went to Clongowes College, in Ireland, when he was eight years old. in order to become a priest. He is expelled because he visited a brothel and returns home in disgrace, at the beginning of The Furys, aged sixteen. On his return Peter has an affair with his sister-in-law, Sheila and later with Mrs Ragner. At the end of The Secret Journey he murders Anna Ragner. Our Time is Gone we learn that he is serving a fifteen years sentence for the murder, and An End and a Beginning is about his life after he leaves prison.
- Brigid Mangan – is Fanny Fury's unmarried sister, who is also a devout Catholic that works ceaselessly for the Church. She lives in Cork, Ireland, but visits Gelton in both The Furys and The Secret Journey. She is senile and does not recognize Peter when he visits her in An End and a Beginning.
- Anthony Mangan – Brigid and Fanny Fury's father, who lives with Fanny. He has suffered a stroke and is unable to talk. In A Secret Journey, Brigid takes his home to Ireland, because she believes that he has money. Soon after returning to Cork she then takes her father to Lourdes, France, in the hope that he will miraculously regain his speech there, and so be able to reveal where his money can be found.
- Professor R. H. Titmouse – is a bizarre, "half-mad", "self-styled Professor of Anthropology", who Peter Fury encounters during the rioting associated with the general strike of 1911.
- Mrs Anna Ragner – is a Jewish money lender in The Secret Journey, though, in The Furys, Maureen Fury says she is German and not a Jew.
- Daniel Corkran – Mrs Ragner's manservant, an ex-sailor who does everything for her, including cooking and washing her underwear.
- Father Moynihan – is the Furys' parish priest in Gelton.
- Father Twomey, a Catholic priest who tirelessly works for the office of the Apostleship of the Sea, on the behalf of shipwrecked sailors, in Winter Song. There is also a Father Twomey at Clongowes College, in The Furys, but it seems unlikely that this is the same man.
- Miss Fetch – is the housekeeper at the Downey family home, Ra Nath, in Cork, the main setting in An End and a Beginning.
- Richard Slye – a character in Our Time is Gone, he is Maureen Fury's admirer, who she ran away with. Slye is an "abortionost's agent, tipster, writer of memorial verses and purveyor of pornography".

== Bibliography ==
- Simon Dentith, "James Hanley's The Furys: The Modernist Subject Goes on Strike". Literature & History, May 2003, vol. 12, no.1, pp. 41–56.
- John Fordham, James Hanley: Modernism and the Working Class. Cardiff: University of Wales Press, 2002
- Edward Stokes, The Novels of James Hanley. Melbourne, Australia, F. W. Cheshire, 1964
- Patrick Williams, " 'No Struggle But the Home': James Hanley's The Furys " in Recharting the Thirties, edited by Patrick J. Quinn, pp. 134–45.

== See also ==
- James Hanley: Boy
- Proletarian literature
