= The Last Safari =

- Directed by: Henry Hathaway
- Written by: John Gay
- Based on: Gilligan's Last Elephant (novel) by Gerald Hanley
- Starring: Kaz Garas; Stewart Granger
- Cinematography: Ted Moore
- Edited by: John Bloom
- Music by: John Dankworth
- Production company: Paramount Pictures
- Distributed by: Paramount Pictures
- Release date: November 1967
- Running time: 110 minutes
- Country: United Kingdom
- Language: English
- Box office: 297,680 admissions (France); 1,095,900 admissions (Spain)

The Last Safari is a 1967 British adventure film directed by Henry Hathaway. It stars Kaz Garas and Stewart Granger. It was based on the 1962 novel, Gilligan's Last Elephant by Gerald Hanley.

== Plot ==
Miles Gilchrist (Stewart Granger) is a big game hunter in Africa. He goes on a safari to shoot an elephant who killed his friend. He is accompanied by Casey (Kaz Garas), an American millionaire intrigued by Gilchrist's story, and Grant (Gabriella Licudi), Casey's half-caste girlfriend.

Miles feels he is to blame for his friend's death, and has to redeem himself. He sees hunter Alec Beaumont (Liam Redmond) refusing to eat with Grant, an indication of how life is different in Africa. Casey and Miles help to save a group of white hunters ambushed in a Masai village.

Later, Miles and Casey are nearly killed by a herd of charging elephants, led by a rogue elephant. Casey refuses to fire knowing Miles also won't shoot, but is not afraid. Casey bids Miles farewell and leaves Africa and Grant, who stays behind in the hopes of finding a new benefactor.

== Cast ==
- Kaz Garas as Casey
- Stewart Granger as Miles Gilchrist
- Gabriella Licudi as Grant
- Johnny Sekka as Jama
- Liam Redmond as Alex Beaumont
- Eugene Deckers as Refugee leader
- David Munya as Chongu
- John De Villiers as Rich
- Wilfred Moore as Game warden
- Jean Parnell as Mrs. Beaumont
- Bill Grant as Commissioner
- John Sutton as Harry
- Kipkoske as Gavai
- Labina as Village chief

== Production ==
The Last Safari was the first of a four-picture deal between Hathaway and Paramount. Kaz Garas was an actor under contract to Hal Wallis.

The film involved five weeks location shooting in Kenya. The corporate jet used in the film was a Learjet 23 leased from Busy Bee. It was painted in zebra stripes for use in the film.

== Reception ==
The Los Angeles Times called The Last Safari, "... a most satisfying film of its kind".

Stewart Granger later called this "my last real film... the worst film ever made in Africa!"
