= Two's Company (musical) =

- Original Cast Recording
- Music: Vernon Duke
- Lyrics: Ogden Nash; Sammy Cahn
- Book: Charles Sherman; Peter DeVries
- Productions: 1952 Broadway

Two's Company is a musical revue with principal sketches by Charles Sherman and Peter DeVries, principal lyrics by Ogden Nash and Sammy Cahn, and principal music by Vernon Duke.

The evening consisted of a series of show business-themed comedy sketches and song-and-dance routines tailored for the talents of its centerpiece, Bette Davis, who accepted the challenge of an eight-shows-a-week schedule when good film roles failed to follow her triumph in All About Eve.

The out-of-town tryout opened at the Shubert Theatre in Detroit on October 19, 1952. In the middle of the third chorus of her first song, an overworked Davis collapsed. Revived by her then-husband Gary Merrill, she walked to the apron of the stage and with a smile commented to the audience, "Well, you can't say I didn't fall for you!," winning over both them and the critics, whose reviews were kind.

From there the show moved to Pittsburgh, where it was met with less enthusiasm, and the creative team began reshaping it on a nightly basis. By the time it reached Boston it was in serious trouble, and noted play doctor and Davis friend John Murray Anderson was called in for consultation. Roles were recast, sketches were eliminated and new ones added, and musical sequences were rearranged. Several songs were contributed by others, including Sheldon Harnick, and Horton Foote was among those who wrote additional sketch material.

Among the leading lady's characterizations were Tallulah Bankhead, Jeanne Eagels, an actress involved with an Italian director, a hillbilly singer on a television variety show, and a performer in parodies of plays by Noël Coward and Arthur Miller.

With Davis bedridden due to exhaustion, the Broadway opening, scheduled for December 4, was postponed. The revue, directed by Jules Dassin and choreographed by Jerome Robbins, finally opened on December 15, 1952 at the Alvin Theatre, where it ran for 90 performances. In addition to Davis, the cast included David Burns, Nora Kaye, George S. Irving, Maria Karnilova, Tina Louise, Ellen Hanley, Stanley Prager, and Hiram Sherman, who won the Tony Award for Best Featured Actor in a Musical. Additionally, Florence Baum (later Florence Brooks, Dunay, then Weisgal) danced in the show. She would later go on to marry EGOT winner Mel Brooks, and had three children with him.

Despite mostly unfavorable notices, the show played to sold-out houses. Davis continued to suffer from fatigue, but doctors could find no physical cause. When a wisdom tooth became inflamed, it was discovered she was suffering from osteomyelitis of the jaw, which required immediate surgery. With no hope of Davis returning in the near future, the producers opted to close the show, but not before Bette Davis's understudy Lenore Korman took over the role. But the production ended up losing $320,000 of the investment. There is an undocumented rumor that Bette Davis wanted no part of this musical and she had from the very beginning found a woman in the singing ensemble who had a most fabulous voice, to eventually take over the role after Davis feigned all her illness. The star's rehabilitation ultimately kept her unemployed for the next three years. That also was an unverified ruse that held that Davis simply took a break.

The original cast recording is available on compact disc on the Sepia label. The compact disc release includes six bonus tracks not on the original cast LP record.

== Song list ==
- Theatre is a Lady
- Turn Me Loose on Broadway
- Clear Blue Sky
- Baby Couldn't Dance
- It Just Occurred to Me
- A Man's Home
- Roundabout
- Roll Along, Sadie
- Esther
- Haunted Hot Spot
- Purple Rose
- Just Like A Man
