= Gabriella Licudi =

British actress (1941–2022)

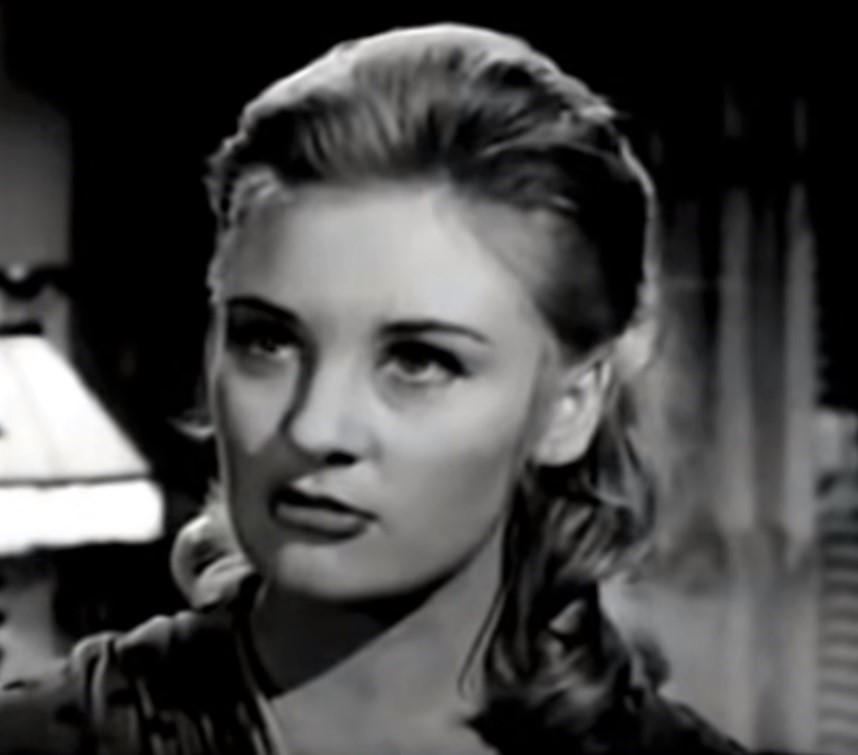
Gabriella Licudi

Gabriella Licudi (born Gabrielle Carmen Stuttard, 14 September 1941 – 18 September 2022) was a British actress.

== Biography ==
Born in Aylesbury, Buckinghamshire, Licudi was the daughter of Northern Ireland-born naval engineer Wilfred James Stuttard and Olga Maria Licudi of Gibraltar. She was educated in England, France and Spain before settling permanently in England at the age of fifteen. Initially planning to teach elocution, she studied at the Central School of Speech and Drama, where she was spotted by an agent while performing in a class production in 1961. Her first major role on stage was John Mortimer's Two Stars for Comfort, starring Trevor Howard, which ran for nine months in London's West End. The film producer Samuel Bronston attended a performance and offered her a small role in The Fall of the Roman Empire (1964).

Other roles included the part of a widowed expatriate opposite Patrick McGoohan in the 1965 episode of Danger Man titled "English Lady Takes Lodgers". Licudi also appeared in the James Bond spoof Casino Royale (1967) opposite Deborah Kerr, the Henry Hathaway film The Last Safari (1967), and in a lead role in Don Levy's experimental feature Herostratus (1967). She also starred in the 1968 BBC production of 'The Hound of the Baskervilles' alongside Peter Cushing as Holmes and Nigel Stock as Watson.

Licudi made her last film appearances in the early 1970s. She and her South African husband ran a safari lodge for several years before she eventually returned to London to run her own production company.

Licudi died on 18 September 2022, four days after her 81st birthday.

== Selected filmography ==
- All Night Long (1962) - Girl (uncredited)
- Edgar Wallace Mysteries (Candidate for Murder) (1962) - Party Guest
- The_Scales_of_Justice (The Invisible Asset) (1963) - Beryl
- Unearthly Stranger (1964) - Julie Davidson
- The Fall of the Roman Empire (1964) - Tauna (uncredited)
- You Must Be Joking! (1965) - Annabelle Nash
- The Liquidator (1965) - Corale
- Casino Royale (1967) - Eliza
- The Jokers (1967) - Eve
- Herostratus (1967) - Clio
- The Last Safari (1967) - Grant
- The Hound of the Baskervilles (1968) TV serial - Beryl Stapleton
- Madame Sin (1972) - Nun
- Special Branch (TV series) (1974) - Lena Drummond
- Soft Beds, Hard Battles (1974) - Simone
