= Jack Kahane =

British writer and published

Jack Kahane (20 July 1887, in Manchester – 2 September 1939, in Paris) was a writer and publisher who founded the Obelisk Press in Paris in 1929.

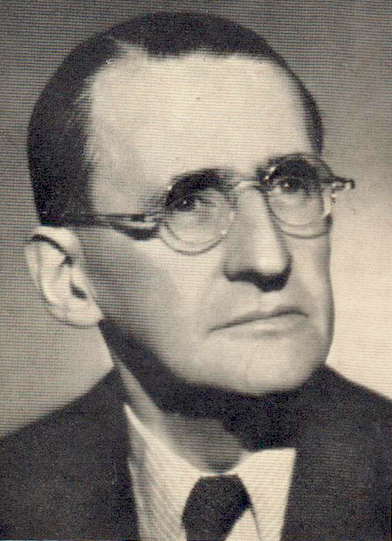
Image of Jack Kahane

He was the son of Selig and Susy Kahane, both immigrants from Romania. Kahane, a novelist, began the Obelisk Press after his publisher, Grant Richards, went bankrupt. Going into partnership with a printer – Herbert Clarke, owner of Imprimerie Vendôme – Kahane published his next novel Daffodil under his own imprint, and under one of several pseudonyms he used, Cecil Barr. A publisher of "dbs" ("dirty books"), Kahane mixed serious work with smut in his list; he was able to take advantage of a legal hiatus whereby English-language books published in France were not subject there to the censorship otherwise effectively practised in the UK and elsewhere, though they remained potentially subject to confiscation when they were imported into English-speaking countries.

The Obelisk Press published Henry Miller's Tropic of Cancer and other works that other publishers would not touch for fear of prosecution, among which were Lady Chatterley's Lover, James Hanley's Boy and some of James Joyce's books.

Jack Kahane was the father of Maurice Girodias, who created the Olympia Press.

== Partial bibliography ==
- Laugh and Grow Rich (1923)
- The Gay Intrigue (1925)
- Suzy Falls Off (1928, by Cecil Barr)
- The Browsing Goat (1929)
- French Model (1931, as Cecil Barr)
- Daffodil (1931, by Cecil Barr)
- Amour: French for Love (1933, by Cecil Barr)
- Bright Pink Youth (1934, by Cecil Barr)
- Lady, Take Heed! (1937, as Cecil Barr)
- Memoirs of a Booklegger (1939)
