= Barefoot Boy with Cheek =

Barefoot Boy With Cheek
- 1947 Broadway playbill
- Music: Sidney Lippman
- Lyrics: Sylvia Dee
- Book: Max Shulman
- Setting: University of Minnesota
- Basis: Barefoot Boy With Cheek by Max Shulman
- Premiere: April 3, 1947: Martin Beck Theatre

Barefoot Boy with Cheek is a 1947 comedic Broadway musical written by Max Shulman, with music by Sidney Lippman and lyrics by Sylvia Dee. The show, which satirizes college life at the "fictitious" University of Minnesota, is based on Shulman's 1943 novel of the same name. It premiered at the Martin Beck Theatre on April 3, 1947, and closed on July 5 of that year after 108 performances.

== Productions ==
Prior to its staging on Broadway, the show saw out-of-town tryouts in March in New Haven and Boston. The show's original act one finale, "Don't Spoil the Party", was cut before its Broadway premiere.

For the Broadway production, George Abbott directed and produced, Milton Rosenstock was the music director, Richard Barstow provided choreography, and Jo Mielziner provided set and lighting design.

In 2011 a reading of the show was done at Manhattan Theatre Club's Creative Center as part of UnsungMusicalsCo. Inc's Archival Project. Jenn Colella, Randy Donaldson, Jenny Fellner, Nick Gaswirth, Drew Gehling, Anne Horak, Robert Lenzi, Sarah Litzsinger, Nora Mae Lyng, Rye Mullis, Greg Reuter, and Max von Essen participated in the reading. The libretto remained almost entirely original, and included "Don't Spoil the Party" in its original placement at the end of act one.

== Cast ==
	1947 Broadway
Roger Hailfellow	Jack Williams
Shyster Fiscal	Red Buttons
Van Varsity	Ben Murphy
Charlie Convertible	Loren Welch
Freshman	Patrick Kingdon
Asa Hearthrug	Billy Redfield
Eino Fflliikkiinnenn	Benjamin Miller
Noblese Oblige	Billie Lou Watt
Clothilde Pfefferkorn	Ellen Hanley
Yetta Samovar	Nancy Walker
Professor Schultz	Philip Coolidge
Peggy Hepp	Shirley Van
Kermit McDermott	Jerry Austen
Boris Fiveyearplan	Solen Burry

== Songs ==
=== Act l ===
- A Toast to Alpha Cholera
- We Feel Our Man Is Definitely You
- The Legendary Eino Fflliikkiinnenn
- Too Nice a Day to Go to School
- I Knew I'd Know
- I'll Turn a Little Cog
- Who Do You Think You Are?
- Everything Leads Right Back to Love
- Little Yetta's Gonna Get a Man
- Alice in Boogieland

=== Act ll ===
- After Graduation Day
- There's Lots of Things You Can Do With Two (But Not With Three)
- The Story of Carrot
- When You Are Eighteen
- Star of the North Star State
- Reprise: I Knew I'd Know
- It Couldn't Be Done (But We Did It)

== Reception ==
The show received positive reviews before its transfer to Broadway, but New York theater critics were less enamored with the show. Audiences, however, seemed to enjoy the production. The show's first full week of performances resulted in a $34,232 box office gross, the highest in the theater's history.
