= Flesh and Blood (1968 film) =

- Screenplay by: William Hanley
- Directed by: Arthur Penn
- Starring: Edmond O'Brien; Kim Stanley; E.G. Marshall; Kim Darby; Suzanne Pleshette; Robert Duvall
- Country of origin: United States
- Original language: English

Production
- Producer: Arthur Penn
- Running time: 100 minutes
- Production company: National Broadcasting Company

Original release
- Network: NBC
- Release: January 26, 1968

Flesh and Blood is a 1968 television film directed by Arthur Penn from an original teleplay by William Hanley. The film aired on NBC on January 26, 1968.

== Cast ==
- Edmond O'Brien (Harry)
- Kim Stanley (Della)
- E.G. Marshall (John)
- Kim Darby (Faye)
- Suzanne Pleshette (Nona)
- Robert Duvall (Howard)

== Production ==
The TV movie was filmed on East 26th Street, Manhattan, and at JC Studios, Brooklyn, New York City.
