= William Hanley =

American dramatist

- Born: October 22, 1931; Lorain, Ohio, United States
- Died: May 25, 2012 (aged 80); Ridgefield, Connecticut, United States
- Occupation: Writer
- Spouse(s): Shelley Post (1956–1961); Pat Stanley (1962–1978; divorced); 2 children
- Relatives: James Hanley, Gerald Hanley (uncles); Ellen Hanley (sister)

William Hanley (October 22, 1931 – May 25, 2012) was an Emmy-winning American playwright, novelist, and scriptwriter, born in Lorain, Ohio. Hanley wrote plays for the theatre, radio and television and published three novels in the 1970s. He was related to the British writers James and Gerald Hanley, and the actress Ellen Hanley was his sister.

== Life ==
William G. Hanley was born on October 22, 1931, Lorain, Ohio, one of three children of William Gerald and Anne Rodgers Hanley. William Hanley Sr. was born in Liverpool, England in 1899, of Irish Catholic immigrants. He was a seaman before settling in the US, and then worked as a housepainter. Shortly after Hanley's birth the family moved to Queens, New York. Hanley attended Cornell for a year, then served in the Army in the early 1950s, before enrolling at the American Academy of Dramatic Arts, though he never pursued an acting career. He worked as a bank clerk, mail clerk, factory worker, and book salesman while writing his early scripts. William Hanley married Shelley Post, 1956 (divorced, 1961), and married Pat Stanley, 1962 (divorced, 1978).

The actress Ellen Hanley (1926–2007) was his sister. She is best known for playing Fiorello La Guardia's first wife in the 1959 Broadway musical "Fiorello!" The British novelist and playwright James Hanley (1897–1985) was his father William's brother. In addition to writing many novels James Hanley also wrote plays for the theatre, radio and television. Another brother was the novelist and script writer Gerald Hanley (1916–1992).

William Hanley died May 25, 2012, after suffering a fall in his home in Ridgefield, Connecticut and was buried in the family plot at Mapleshade Cemetery, next to his parents and sister. He was 80.

== Works ==
Hanley was a successful Broadway and off Broadway playwright in the 1960s. Howard Taubman wrote in The New York Times in 1962, that Hanley was "an uncommonly gifted writer." But the accolades, and a Tony nomination, did not provide commercial success. Slow Dance on the Killing Ground ran for 88 performances, the Off-Broadway plays had closed within a month. However Hanley, subsequently he had a successful career in television, beginning with Flesh and Blood which was originally a stage play that Hanley sold in 1966, to NBC for $112,500, "at the time the most that television had paid an author for a single work". Over a period of thirty years Hanley wrote more than two dozen TV scripts. He also published three novels in the 1970s. He was the original screenwriter on The Graduate (1967), but walked off the project after getting notes he didn't agree with from director Mike Nichols.

== Reputation ==
Hanley was nominated for an Emmy award five times, and won twice: for the 1984 ABC movie Something About Amelia and again in 1988 for the mini-series The Attic: The Hiding of Anne Frank, which starred Paul Scofield, Mary Steenburgen and, as Anne, Lisa Jacobs. Something About Amelia also won a 1984 Golden Globe Award for Best Television Limited Series or Motion Picture made for Television.

== Novels ==
- Blue Dreams. Delacorte Press, New York, 1971
- Mixed Feelings. Garden City: Doubleday & Co., 1972
- Leaving Mount Venus. Ballantine Books, 1977

== Stage plays ==
- Whisper into My Good Ear. Cast Theater, New York, October 1, 1962
- Mrs. Dally Has a Lover and Other Plays. October 1, 1962
- Conversations in the Dark. Produced in Philadelphia, Pa. at Walnut Street Theatre, December 23, 1963
- Slow Dance on the Killing Ground. Produced on Broadway at Plymouth Theatre, November 30, 1964; Greenwich Theatre, London, England: Opened November 11, 1991.
- Today Is Independence Day. First produced Berlin, Germany 1963; New York? September 22, 1965

== Published plays (including anthologies) ==
- Mrs Dally Has a Lover and Other Plays. New York: Dial Press, 1963. (Mrs Dally Has a Lover; Today is Independence Day; Whisper in My Good Ear).
- Whisper in My Good Ear [and] Mrs. Dally Has a Lover; Two plays, Dramatists Play Service. 1963
- Slow Dance on the Killing Ground. New York: Random House, 1964
- No Answer. New York: Random House, 1968 (also in the anthology Collision Course—see below)
- Flesh and Blood. New York: Dramatists Play Service, 1968
- The Best Plays of 1964–1965, edited by Otis L. Guernsey Jr. Dodd, 1965
- New Theater in America, Vol. 1. New York: Delta, 1965
- Collision Course, edited by Edward Parone. New York: Random House, 1968
- Best American Plays, Sixth Series, edited by John Gassner and Clive Barnes. New York: Crown Publishing, 1971

== Screenplay ==
- The Gypsy Moths (1969)

== Plays for television ==
- 1968 Flesh and Blood (TV movie)
- 1973 Mrs. Dally Has a Lover (TV movie)
- 1975 Whisper into My Good Ear (TV movie)
- 1977 Testimony of Two Men (TV mini-series)
- 1978 Who'll Save Our Children? (TV movie)
- 1979 Too Far to Go (TV movie)
- 1980 Father Figure (TV movie)
- 1980 The Silent Lovers (TV movie) (teleplay)
- 1980 The Scarlett O'Hara War (TV movie) (teleplay)
- 1982 Little Gloria... Happy at Last
- 1984 Something About Amelia (Won Emmy).
- 1984 Celebrity
- 1987 When the Time Comes (TV movie)
- 1987 Nutcracker: Money, Madness & Murder (TV mini-series)
- 1988 Tales from the Hollywood Hills: Golden Land (TV movie) (teleplay)
- 1988 The Attic: The Hiding of Anne Frank (TV movie)
- 1990 The Kennedys of Massachusetts (TV mini-series)
- 1991 Our Sons (TV movie) (written by)
- 1991 In Broad Daylight (TV movie) (teleplay)
- 1991The Last to Go (TV movie) (teleplay)
- 1994 Scarlett (TV mini-series)
- 1997 Ellen Foster (TV movie) (teleplay)
- 1997 Passion's Way
- 1998 The Long Way Home (TV movie) (teleplay)
- 1999 The Reef (teleplay)

== Radio play ==
- A Country without Rain (1970)

== Awards ==
- 1963 Vernon Rice Award
- 1965 John Gassner Award
- 1988 Emmy: The Attic: The Hiding of Anne Frank. Outstanding Writing in a Miniseries or a Special
- 1988 Edgar Award: Best Mystery TV Episode: Winner: Nutcracker: Money, Murder, and Madness
