= Peter Stephens (actor) =

British actor (1920–1972)

- Born: Peter Stephens; 3 January 1920; Morro Velho, Minas Gerais, Brazil
- Died: 17 September 1972 (aged 52); Kensington, London, England
- Occupation: Actor
- Notable work: Doctor Who

Peter Stephens (3 January 1920 – 17 September 1972) was an English stage, film and television supporting actor, notable for his appearances in various BBC television shows throughout the 60s, most famously for his portrayal of the Bunteresque character Cyril in the Doctor Who serial The Celestial Toymaker. He was also the director of one film during his career.

== Career ==
Stephens first appeared in films playing Major Lench in the 1956 John Boulting offering, Private's Progress, which starred Richard Attenborough as an innocent young recruit who gets involved with a gang of Army spivs. In the same year, he also made his first major television appearance as Hassan Ben Ali in "Albania", an episode of the ITC Entertainment adventure serial The Count of Monte Cristo. He took a lesser role in the ITV "Television Playhouse" production of Skipper Next to God, portraying a Dutch officer.

In 1957, he switched to the BBC, playing Monte in No Shepherds Watched, the story of a bungling criminal family headed by Warren Mitchell, whose plans for a robbery are foiled by a café owner, played by Mitchell's future Till Death Us Do Part fictional wife, Dandy Nichols.

His only film appearance that year was in the Columbia Pictures British black-and-white film, Kill Her Gently, directed by Charles Saunders but with no star names appearing in the main roles of a man, his wife, and his chance encounter with two known prison escapees, whom he then tries to employ to murder his spouse.

He appeared in two TV series in 1958 – the 6-part "demob" saga from the BBC called Fair Game, and the popular police programme Dixon of Dock Green (playing Todd in "The Key of the Nick").

=== Directing one film ===
Peter Stephens' only film as a director, Mustang!, was released through United Artists in 1959. It was based on the book Capture of the Golden Stallion by Rutherford Montgomery, and tells of the attempts by occupants of a ranch first to kill a troublesome wild mustang horse, and then to capture and tame it. He had been approached by film producers Robert Franklyn and Sam Abarbanel to make the Western in the early 1950s, and shooting took place in California and Oklahoma, with the final edit ready by 1955. Unfortunately, the picture quality was poor, reputedly because it had been shot with 16mm film and then enlarged to 35mm.

=== Returning to acting ===
He returned to Dixon of Dock Green once more in 1959, though playing an entirely different character, Chapman, in "Over and Out". He also took the role of Mr Lirriper in "The Runaways", part of the Tales from Dickens presentations by Fredric March.

His work in the early 1960s included regular appearances in some well-known productions for television, such as Maigret (1960), Danger Man (1961 and 1966) and the 1962 mini-series of Oliver Twist (featuring a young Melvyn Hayes as the Artful Dodger) when Stephens played Mr Limbkins. He also played a councillor in Sir Francis Drake in 1962, after which he took time out to appear on the stage.

On 6 August 1964, Stephens opened at the New Arts Theatre in the London premiere of Alan Ayckbourn's play Mr Whatnot, portraying Herbert the Butler, amongst a cast which included Ronnie Barker, Ronnie Stevens and Judy Cornwell. He did find time to play two characters on television that year, Mr Dawson in "My Late Dear Husband", an episode in the popular Scottish series Dr. Finlay's Casebook, and Mr Jinkins in the BBC's 13 part serial Martin Chuzzlewit, adapted from Charles Dickens' novel.

1965 saw a brief return to the cinema for him, portraying Sir Giles Redman in the 30-minute "Scales of Justice" featurette The Hidden Face. In television that year, he made appearances in single episodes of more anthology-style series, namely The Man in Room 17, Out of the Unknown, An Enemy of the State, and Sir Arthur Conan Doyle.

=== Doctor Who and "Cyril" ===
Perhaps Stephens' best-remembered performances were in three episodes of season 3 of Doctor Who, the long-running British sci-fi series featuring a time-travelling Time Lord played in this series by William Hartnell. In the storyline popularly known as The Celestial Toymaker, he played both Cyril the kitchen boy and the animated playing card the Knave of Hearts. The producers subsequently received complaints from lawyers acting on behalf of the deceased author Charles Hamilton's estate. The character Cyril was said to bear a remarkable resemblance to William George Bunter, whom Hamilton wrote many books about under the pen name Frank Richards. The BBC finally issued a disclaimer, saying that Cyril was merely "Bunter-like".

Stephens would portray a completely different character, Lolem, during episodes one and three of the 1967 serial The Underwater Menace while Patrick Troughton was playing the Doctor.

=== Final years ===
Stephens made further 1967 television appearances in Adam Adamant Lives!, Dr. Finlay's Casebook (for the second time, but as a different character), and played Felix Delmer in one episode of the BBC drama Champion House.

He continued his film career in 1967 by appearing in a 38-minute short film called Money-Go-Round, based on dealings at the Stock Exchange, and in which he played a tycoon. He followed this in the same year with a more prominent role as Farson in the full-length film Herostratus, whose plot involves issues on suicide, and featured minor roles for a young Helen Mirren and Malcolm Muggeridge, who played himself.

In the Wednesday Play series, he appeared as Captain Carruthers in the final part of Alan Plater's 1968 trilogy, To See How Far It Is, about a "humble pen-pusher in a cardboard factory" who, in his attempts to brighten up his life, ends up surrounded by "a little feminine company" on a cruise ship. He could also be seen on TV in that year in another anthology series, "ITV Playhouse", playing Mr Morrow alongside Nicky Henson and Ronald Fraser in Peter Wildeblood's play Rogues' Gallery: The Lives and Crimes of Jonathan Wild and Jack Sheppard.

Stephens' only cinema appearance of 1969 was as the Abbott of St Mary's in the Hammer/LWT co-production Wolfshead. He was very busy on the small screen however. He took the parts of Bellchamber in "Love All", an episode of the ITV series The Avengers, Quintin Blythe in one episode of Yorkshire Television's The Flaxton Boys serial, and Sir Timothy Grange in "When did You Start to Stop Seeing Things?", from the offbeat ghost-related television series Randall and Hopkirk. He also played Mr Bailey in seven instalments of the TV series Mr Digby Darling, which starred Peter Jones and Sheila Hancock.

After portraying Don Gutierre in the BBC's epic historical drama The Six Wives of Henry VIII, he made a cinema film alongside Jean Simmons called Say Hello to Yesterday, in which he played a businessman.

1971 saw many television appearances from Stephens. The list included Doctor in the House, Brett, Z-Cars, and portraying Beppo Bowles in Eyeless in Gaza.

He made a major film in 1971 with Pier Paolo Pasolini, I Racconti di Canterbury, an Italian language adaptation of Chaucer's The Canterbury Tales, playing Justinus. He had previously appeared as a friar in the BBC's bawdy 1969 TV version. The friar turned up in episode 5, entitled "The Wife of Bath's Tale/The Clerk's Tale".

In late 1971 another film, Hammer Films' Twins of Evil, was released, starring Peter Cushing, and in which Stephens supported as a member of the Brotherhood, a fictional sect which fought vampirism in Central Europe in the 19th century.

In the final year of his life, he secured a regular role as the chairman of the board of St. Swithin's Hospital in four episodes of Doctor in Charge, the ITV comedy series based on Richard Gordon's books, and starring Robin Nedwell, George Layton, Geoffrey Davies and Richard O'Sullivan.

His last ever film was Go for a Take, (released posthumously), an inward-looking treatment satirising the film industry, in which he took the part of a film director who has to contend with two men 'on the run' invading a set, pretending to be film extras.

Peter Stephens died on 17 September 1972; however, one further appearance occurred posthumously — his portrayal of Amlodd in HTV's historical adventure series Arthur of the Britons. The episode he had completed before his death, "In Common Cause", was not broadcast until 24 October 1973.

== Filmography ==
Year	Title	Role	Notes
1956	Private's Progress	Major Lench	Uncredited
1957	Kill Her Gently	Bank Manager	
1958	The Diary of Samuel Pepys	Lord Clarendon	3 episodes
1960	The Flesh and the Fiends	McBain	Uncredited
1960-1966	Danger Man	Casseius Jones/Frankie	2 episodes
1965	Out of the Unknown	Stephenson	Episode: Time in Advance
1966-1967	Doctor Who	Kitchen boy/Knave of Hearts/ Cyril/Lolem	5 episodes
1969	The Avengers	Mr. Bellchamber	Episode: Love All
1970	The Six Wives of Henry VIII	Gutierre Gómez de Fuensalida	Miniseries
1971	Say Hello to Yesterday	Businessman	Uncredited
1971	Twins of Evil	Member of the Brotherhood	Uncredited
1972	The Canterbury Tales	Justinus	
1972	Go for a Take	Director	
1973	Wolfshead: The Legend of Robin Hood	Abbot of St. Mary's	
1973	Arthur of the Britons	Amlodd	Episode: In Common Cause
