= Boriswood =

Defunct British publishing house

Boriswood Limited
- Industry: Publishing
- Founded: 1931; 95 years ago
- Defunct: 1938
- Headquarters: London, United Kingdom
- Key people: Cecil J Greenwood; Kenneth W Marshall; John Morris; Terence T Bond

Boriswood Limited was a small London publishing house which was active from 1931 until 1938. The directors, at various times, were Cecil J Greenwood, Kenneth W Marshall, John Morris and the New Zealander Terence T Bond. It also incorporated another imprint Cranley & Day. In its short existence Boriswood published at least 68 titles, in fine limited and trade editions, mainly of new poetry and fiction.

Boriswood’s first trade edition book was printed in the basement of Boriswood's premises 15A Harrington Road, South Kensington on an electrified platen press. Boriswood’s list was left-leaning, modernist and provocative. Roy Campbell was one of the first poets to be published by the firm (The Georgiad 1931) while James Hanley was their most important novelist.

Hanley’s Boy was one of their first books, published in 1931. It eventually led to Boriswood’s prosecution in Manchester in 1935 for obscene libel. Boriswood pleaded guilty (as advised) and was fined a large sum. This, together with the associated controversy, eventually led to its closure and its stock was purchased by Greenwood. T E Lawrence and K W Marshall corresponded about the litigation around Boy.

The remaining copies of the trade edition of Boy were sold to the Obelisk Press which re-published it in 1935. (It was republished by Penguin in 1990 with an introduction by Anthony Burgess).

Amongst Boriswood’s other authors were Georges Bernanos, Hart Crane, Vardis Fisher, Simon Jesty, Archibald MacLeish, John Pudney, Jules Romains and Rex Warner. Boriswood published several translations of Soviet fiction by Alec Brown, including Yury Tynyanov's Death and Diplomacy in Persia. Boriswood employed important illustrators of the day including David Jones and New Zealand-born artist James Boswell for its illustrated dust wrappers.

Boriswood's non fiction list included risqué titles for their day such as The Sexual Impulse (1935) by Edward Charles and, unusually, a book on furniture and design, extensively illustrated with photographs, Modern Furniture (1936) by E Nelson Exton and Frederic H Littman.
