= Warrior Queen =

- Genre: Historical drama
- Created by: Martin Mellett
- Directed by: Michael Custance; Neville Green
- Starring: Sian Phillips; Nigel Hawthorne
- Composers: Dominic Muldowney; Stuart Orme
- Country of origin: United Kingdom
- Original language: English
- No. of series: 1
- No. of episodes: 6

Production
- Producer: Ruth Boswell
- Running time: 30 minutes

Original release
- Network: ITV
- Release: 20 February – 27 March 1978

Warrior Queen is a British television series made by Thames Television for ITV that was broadcast from 20 February to 27 March 1978.

Set in Britain under Roman rule, this historical drama starred Siân Phillips in the title role as Boudica, queen of the Iceni and chronicled her efforts to maintain the peace for her people and fight the Romans. Nigel Hawthorne played the Roman procurator (financial administrator and tax collector) Catus Decianus.

== Cast ==
- Sian Phillips as Boudica
- Nigel Hawthorne as Caius Decianus
- Michael Gothard as Volthan
- Patti Love as Tasca
- Veronica Roberts as Camora
- Tony Haygarth as Moticcus
- Darien Angadi as Kuno

== DVD release ==
The complete series of Warrior Queen is available on DVD in the UK.
