= Edward Charles (author) =

British educator and sexologist

Edward Charles Edmond Hempstead
- Born: 1898; Anacapri, Capri, Italy
- Died: 1961 (aged 62–63)
- Occupations: Author, Educator
- Writing career
- Pen name: Edward Charles
- Genre: Autobiography
- Notable works: The Sexual Impulse, Indian Patchwork

Edward Charles Edmond Hemsted (born Anacapri, Isola de Capri, 1898), better known by the pen name Edward Charles, was an English author, educator, social advocate and sexologist.

His most famous writings are The Sexual Impulse, Mens Gods, Those Thoughtful People, Sand & the Blue Moss, Apple Pie Bed, Indian Patchwork (with "Mary Charles", a pseudonym for his wife, Dorothy Mary Chance), Portrait of the Artist's Children and Idle Hands.

== Life ==
He was educated at Lancing College, St John's College, University of Oxford (where he took a double first) and Louvain University. During the early 1920s, he was a professor of English in Japan (where he tutored the sons of the Emperor of Japan), then a professor at the University of Peking. He sailed to Singapore on a tramp steamer, and worked as a barman at the "Long Bar" of the Raffles Hotel, before returning to Oxford. He later moved to India and served as principal of a Muslim-Hindu school in central India from 1927 to 1928. He also taught in the US. In 1935, he was involved in a major trial involving the publication of his work, The Sexual Impulse (An introduction to the study of the psychology and physiology and bio-chemistry of the sexual impulse among adults in mental and bodily health, London: Boriswood).

He was a major proponent of sexology, and in particular the promotion of contraception.

== Works ==
- Those Thoughtful People (1930)
- Apple Pie Bed (1931)
- Mens Gods (1931)
- Sand & the Blue Moss (1931)
- Indian Patchwork (1933)
- Muscara (1934)
- Portrait of the Artist's Children (1934)
- The Sexual Impulse (1935)
- Idle Hands (1936)
