= Sylvia Dee =

American lyricist and novelist (1914–1967)

- Born: Josephine Moore; October 22, 1914; Little Rock, Arkansas
- Died: June 12, 1967 (aged 52); New York City, New York, United States
- Education: University of Michigan
- Occupations: Lyricist, novelist

Sylvia Dee (born Josephine Moore, October 22, 1914 – June 12, 1967) was an American lyricist and novelist best known for writing the lyrics to "Too Young", a hit for Nat King Cole; "The End of the World", a hit for Skeeter Davis; and "Bring Me Sunshine", which was Morecambe & Wise's signature tune.

== Biography ==
Dee was born in Little Rock, Arkansas and educated at the University of Michigan. She was a copywriter for a newspaper in Rochester, New York, and wrote a number of short stories as well as the Broadway stage scores for "Barefoot Boy With Cheek". Joining ASCAP in 1943, her musical collaborators included Sidney Lippman, Arthur Kent, Elizabeth Evelyn Moore, George Goehring, Al Frisch and Guy Wood.

Dee wrote the words to a nonsense song that went to number 1 in 1945 called "Chickery Chick". The music was written by Sidney Lippman and it was played by Sammy Kaye's orchestra. Its nonsense lyrics included "Chickery chick, cha-la, cha-la". She co-wrote "I Taught Him Everything He Knows" with Arthur Kent, recorded by Ella Fitzgerald on her 1968 Capitol release Misty Blue. She co-wrote "Look for Me (I'll Be Around)" with Guy Wood, which was recorded by Sarah Vaughan on The Benny Carter Sessions and Neko Case on Blacklisted. She also wrote songs for Connie Francis ("Robot Man") and Elvis Presley in the films Blue Hawaii and Speedway. Popular-song compositions also include "It Couldn't Be True", "Stardreams", "I'm Thrilled", "Have You Changed", "After Graduation Day", "Laroo Laroo Lili Bolero", "Angel Lips, Angel Eyes", "Pushcart Serenade", "A House With Love In It", "Moonlight Swim", "That's the Chance You Take", "Somebody Nobody Wants", and "Please Don't Talk to the Lifeguard".

== Death ==
At the time of her death in New York City, she was the wife of Dr. Jere Faison, a New York gynecologist. She was interred in Greenwood Cemetery, Monmouth County, NJ as Josephine Proffitt Faison.
