= Sidney Lippman =

American songwriter (1914–2003)

- Born: March 1, 1914
- Origin: University of Minnesota
- Died: March 11, 2003 (aged 89) North Bergen, New Jersey, United States
- Occupations: Composer, songwriter
- Formerly of: Sylvia Dee

Sidney Lippman (March 1, 1914 – March 11, 2003) was an American composer and songwriter. He wrote the music for Nat King Cole's 1951 No. 1 hit "Too Young".

== Early life and education ==
Sidney Lippman, also called Sid, was a native of Minneapolis and graduated from the University of Minnesota. During World War II he was a merchant seaman. He moved to Manhattan and studied musical composition for a year at the Juilliard School.

== Career ==
"Too Young's" words were written by Sylvia Dee, a lyricist and longtime collaborator with Lippman. They got the idea for the song when she told him that her younger brother was getting married and she thought he was too young. "As she said that," Mr. Lippman recalled, "she looked at me and I looked at her and we both said, 'Title?' "

He teamed up with Buddy Kaye and Fred Wise to do the words and music for "'A' - You're Adorable (The Alphabet Song)", which also became a No. 1 hit in 1949, as an RCA Victor recording with Perry Como and the Fontane Sisters. Lippman's other successful pop songs included the novelty Chickery Chick, which was a number one hit for Sammy Kaye in 1945.

During his career, Lippman worked with Burt Reynolds, Andy Minsker and Tracey Ullman.

== Death ==
He died aged 89, in a nursing home, in North Bergen, New Jersey and had lived in Fort Lee.

== Musical theatre ==
- Barefoot Boy with Cheek (1947); Broadway musical; music by Lippman; lyrics by Sylvia Dee; book by Max Shulman
