= Herostratus (film) =

1967 British film by Don Levy

- Directed by: Don Levy
- Written by: Don Levy
- Based on: Herostratus
- Produced by: Don Levy; James Quinn
- Starring: Michael Gothard; Gabriella Licudi; Peter Stephens; Antony Paul
- Cinematography: Keith Allams
- Edited by: Don Levy
- Music by: Halim El-Dabh; John Mayer
- Production companies: BBC; British Film Institute
- Distributed by: British Film Institute
- Release date: 2 April 1967 (UK)
- Running time: 142 minutes
- Country: United Kingdom
- Language: English

Herostratus is a 1967 British experimental psychological drama film directed and produced by Don Levy, with the assistance of James Quinn. The film follows a young poet named Max (Michael Gothard), who out of ennui and a desire for fame arranges with the marketer Farson (Peter Stephens) to commit suicide in public. Farson agrees to turn his suicide into a high-profile media spectacle. Clio (Gabriella Licudi), an attractive woman who is Farson's secretary, aids Max in his goals. The film also stars Antony Paul and Mona Hammond (credited as Mona Chin), as well as Helen Mirren in her first credited film role.

The film was first screened publicly on 3 May 1968 having taken a total of six years to develop from the initial scripting. Its initial release was limited to film festivals and art house cinemas in Europe, and it did not have a wider cinematic release. In 2009 the film was re-released by the British Film Institute as part of the BFI Flipside series. Both initial reception of the film and the reception at the time of its re-release were heavily mixed, and while many critics had more favourable responses to the film, the public response was generally more negative.

The film critiques consumerism and the advertising industry of the time, whilst also featuring themes of death, urbanisation, and the growing countercultural movement of the time. Levy used a number of unorthodox directing techniques in the creation of the film with the aim of heightening the film's emotional impact, some of which greatly distressed other members of the film crew.

== Plot ==
The film opens with scenes of Max dressed in all white and sprinting through the streets of London. He returns home to a run-down, one-room apartment and begins playing classical music over a speaker, at a volume that causes the landlady to bang on his door and demand him to stop disrupting the other people living in the apartments. Eventually Max stops the music and picks up an axe, using it to destroy the furnishing and the decorations in the room in a manic rage. After destroying his room, Max storms out of the building and into the streets.

Still brandishing the axe and threatening a number of passers-by as he walks through the streets to reach offices for "Farson Advertising". Here he meets Clio, who is acting as a receptionist for Farson, and declares to her that he has the greatest advertising opportunity in the world. Clio does not agree to let Max in and so he continues to harass her, eventually grabbing a phone from her desk and calling Farson directly.

Upon meeting Farson, Max declares his intent to commit suicide and offers to give him complete directive control of the event in any way that he likes, provided as many people as possible witness Max's death. Farson initially rejects this idea, however he eventually accepts the proposition as Max continues to harass both Farson and Clio. Upon coming to an agreement Farson organises a room for Max to stay in until the day where he will commit suicide, and orders a cab to take Max there.

A number of scenes are then presented, not necessarily in chronological order and all happening at unspecified points in time after Max meets with Farson, but before the date at which Max will kill himself.

- An unnamed woman (Helen Mirren) performs a burlesque dance that is revealed as it progresses to be an advertisement for a brand of rubber washing gloves. The advertisement is then disrupted by Max running on-stage, where he picks up the unnamed woman and runs off-stage with her to the protests of both her and the film crew.
- Farson introduces Max to Pointer (Antony Paul), who Farson indicates will be controlling Max's public image in the lead up to his suicide. Farson and Pointer then discuss the image that they want to convey with Max, and highlight that they want Max's suicide to have some sort of purpose or grand message. Max is greatly upset by this discussion, and argues that he does not want to take part in constructing any special image or conveying any particular message with his suicide. He also expresses disgust for the level of control that Farson and Pointer are trying to have over his life. Farson reminds Max that he is contractually obliged to go through with his suicide, and that up until that point he had promised them that he would do whatever they want.
- Max is shown watching a news report on the television discussing him and his suicide attempts. The news reporter says that they don't think it is very likely anyone will be interested in Max's suicide, or that anyone will turn up to see it. Upon hearing this Max destroys the television in a fit of rage, using the same axe from the beginning of the film.
- Max is filming an advertisement for TV where he declares his intent to commit suicide and then stops, refusing to read any more of the script that Pointer has prepared for him. With Max's refusal, Pointer takes the script and reads it instead to the camera. The script announces that Max's suicide is not intended to get people to change their way of living, and that instead it is a warning to be careful for people who are trying to change the common way of life. Max is greatly upset by this speech and its nationalist themes and storms out of the film studio.

The night before Max is set to kill himself, Clio arrives in his room late at night. They discuss Max's upcoming suicide, and Clio expressed her empathy for Max. Max admits to her that he mainly wants to commit suicide because he does not feel that anyone has ever noticed him or cared about him, and that by committing suicide he will be able to command the attention and care of the general public who will want him to stop. Clio again expresses her empathy and care for Max, and the two have sex. Afterwards Max expresses his desire to look after Clio and protect her and tells her that he is feeling much happier with his place in life. They fall asleep together, however Clio wakes up during the night crying and leaves the room. As she leaves she comes across Farson who has been watching the two of them, and he asks her how the evening had gone.

Max is awoken in the morning by Farson, and demonstrates a renewed enthusiasm for life. He tells Farson that he does not want to kill himself, and that he is very happy with his situation. Farson berates him for this decision, stating that Max had never achieved anything meaningful with his life and that going through with his suicide would be his only chance to achieve something. Farson then reveals that he paid Clio to visit Max the night before to comfort him and sleep with him. Upon hearing this, Max is overcome with anguish and flees the building.

Max runs to the rooftop of the building where Farson and Pointer decided that he would commit suicide. On the rooftop Max begins shouting into the megaphone to the ground below, and although there are no people on the ground at the time he does draw the attention of a worker who was also on top of the building. As Max prepares to jump from the roof the worker pulls him away from the edge, and attempts to wrestle him to the ground. The two fight and in the scuffle Max knocks the worker off the edge of the building. Max runs to the ground floor where he sees the worker's dead body and sees only one other person who has noticed the death of the worker. Realising that no one would have cared if he had committed suicide instead he flees the scene, distraught. As Max runs it is revealed that the scene of him running at the beginning of the film was the same scene as this one at the end of the film, bringing a cyclical end to his story.

At the same time Clio runs from Farson, distraught since she believes that her actions have led to Max killing himself. As Farson catches up to her she berates him for what he has done, and after Farson admits that he has been motivated by his love for Clio she commands him to apologise to her on his knees. Farson does, however this does not help Clio feel any better and she breaks down into tears. Clio is then shown distraught and alone. She cries out that she wants to get out from her situation and an unknown voice from off-screen replies that she can get out, and she is choosing not to.

== Cast ==
- Michael Gothard as Max
- Gabriella Licudi as Clio
- Peter Stephens as Farson
- Antony Paul as Pointer
- Mona Hammond as Sandy

Some of the film's unnamed characters are played by Hilda Marvin, Brigitte St. John, Malcolm Muggeridge, Vivienne Myles and (a then-unknown) Helen Mirren in her first credited film role.

== Themes and interpretations ==
=== Emotion ===
Levy was particularly interested with the audience's experience of films emotionally rather than the experience of a coherent narrative, and also wanted to break the barrier between the film and its audience with the intent to produce an "alienation effect". While at Slade he wrote that he wished to "investigate the problems of perception, memory, time-sense and emotion associated with the techniques of the film medium", and throughout Herostratus the composition of many scenes rests on their emotional impact rather than any pervasive symbolic meaning. In his essay "You CAN get out: Herostratus Now" critic Amnon Buchbinder discusses the recurrent slaughterhouse and striptease scenes as one example of the film's emotional purpose, and asserts that these scenes do not convey distinct symbolic meaning. To Buchbinder the combination of these sequences is intended to convey the experiences of desire and disgust to the audience, through the juxtaposition of visceral scenes of both "The rending of flesh and the revealing of flesh".

Key to reinforcing the emotional impact of the film was Levy's directing of the actors, specifically what he referred to in his notes for the film as a "special form of improvisation... exploiting the subconscious". Although the specifics of this technique are not known, Levy discussed aspects of his directorial techniques in an interview before the release of the film. Levy highlighted that none of the actors were provided scripts for the scenes, and that the directorial techniques that were being used led to some of the actors being in a seemingly hypnotic state during filming. Critic Stuart Heaney states that this style of directing is an attempt to heighten the emotional reality of the film by removing the boundaries between the director and the actors, and also impacting the boundaries between the actors and the audience. Buchbinder presents a similar view of the film, stating that "Levy's actors are surrogates for the audience" and further proposing that "the film's method is to traumatise its audience, and then cauterise the wound with beauty".

=== Advertising and consumerism ===
One of the central themes of the film is a criticism of consumerism and the advertising industry of the time. Max is overtly manipulated by Farson's advertising agency throughout the film, and his attempts to subvert this control are all thwarted due to the immense power that the agency holds over him. May describes this plot structure as "a weighty token of retaliation against 1960's materialism".

A fake advertisement for rubber gloves in Herostratus, satirising the sexualisation of women common in advertisements for housework products by highlighting the artificial nature of such advertisements.

In her essay "Colour and the Critique of Advertising," Sarah Street discusses how Herostratus employs many techniques that were commonly used in advertising at the time, especially manipulation of colour and gloss, to highlight the constructed falsehoods of advertisements. Street writes that Herostratus uses colour "to expose and exploit [advertising] conventions: how saturation, light and texture indicate superficiality not depth in advertising contexts." while also highlighting the immense power that these kinds of techniques can have "in terms of their unambiguous, persuasive messaging".

Street highlights the scene where Max stumbles onto the set of a rubber glove advertisement as one example of the overt criticism of advertising present in the film. Throughout the scene the sexualisation of the mundane consumer goods overtly mirrors advertisements from the 1960s, and Street argues that this sexualisation only becomes noticeable since the audience is viewing the scene through Max's "outsider" perspective in the advertising agency. The overtly manipulated colour scheme of this scene, a motif used recurrently throughout the film, also contributes to highlighting the artificial nature of advertisements and simultaneously impacts the audience's emotional reception of the scene. Throughout the film, similar scenes and repeated motifs like the manipulation of colour continue to symbolise and represent the constructed nature of advertising to the audience, and highlight what Street described as Levy's "profound distrust" of the advertising industry.

=== Urbanisation ===
The film was entirely shot on location in London, and distinctly captures the aesthetic qualities of the city while also not directly locating itself in London. Max’s relationship with the city and its housing is transient, renting within the dilapidated remains of a house that is described in the film as having been a mansion in the past. The other people that rent alongside Max further represent portions of the working class in an increasingly urbanised society. Further, Max and those that rent alongside him have been interpreted as a representation of many of the concepts that the Greater London Council was working against in the 1960s as it attempted to push for ‘slum clearance’ and ‘urban renewal’ as the population of the city drastically changed over the decade.

== Style ==
Herostratus is told in an experimental style, with significant cuts between the loosely followed plot and other sequences. These scenes are often used to provide a context or insight into the character's emotions, or insight into Levy's more direct thematic messages. The film extensively features poetry readings by Allen Ginsberg, footage of cattle being slaughtered and processed, and a recurrent striptease scene intercut with the interactions between Max, Farson, and Clio. It additionally contains footage from a number of historical events, most representing the impacts of World War II or the post-war urban decay in London. Levy's wife, Ines Levy, also plays an imposing figure in black leather who appears in a number of these scenes. Other aspects such as the colours of individual scenes have been identified as working to highlight the emotional impact of the film.

== Production ==
=== Background ===
Don Levy was inspired by the Greek historical figure Herostratus, and developed the idea for the film in 1962 from this legend and a story written by Alan Daiches whilst a post-graduate student at the Slade School of Fine Art under the supervision of Thorold Dickinson. He presented his initial draft to the British Film Institute's Experimental Film Fund in attempt to gain funding for the film and was rejected, with the chairman of the fund, Michael Balcon, writing in a letter to its secretary that the film was "a project for a somewhat adventurous commercial company" and expressing "bewilderment" at the film's script. As well as this, in his initial proposal Levy requested £3,235 to produce a 60-80-minute film. The committee in charge of funding did not believe that Levy would be able to produce a film of that size on such a small budget, and also stated that such a sum would take up a significant portion of the fund's available resources. However, in a series of letters to both Balcon and the fund's secretary Stevenson, film director and critic Basil Wright provided significant support for the film and its script which led to the Experimental Film Fund providing £1500 for the film's production.

Levy received further funding from the then Controller of Television Programmes for the BBC, Huw Wheldon, who provided an additional contribution of £1500, and £1500 more from James Quinn who overshot Levy's budget forecast to ensure that the film could be made in colour. This whole process took two years, and by 1964 the cost of production had risen to the extent that Levy had to rely on gifted and loaned equipment from the production crew as well as others in the film industry to keep the film within budget.

=== Casting ===
Levy spent a considerable amount of time running potential actors through improvisational auditions, and eventually selected Michael Gothard, Gabriella Licudi and Peter Stephens for the lead roles. These improvisational auditions were an attempt by Levy to heighten the emotional reality presented by the film, and through the film he attempts to use this improvisational acting to distinctly induce specific feelings and emotions in the audience. Although he had developed a script for the film, the actors were never given a copy or any other specific directions.

=== Filming ===
Throughout the filming Levy directed the characterisation and dialogue through what he described as "a very complicated process of improvisation and recall", with the goal of "enveloping the characters of the play". He used these techniques in an attempt to bring forwards the subconscious feelings of the actors and create a heightened emotional state in them that extended to the audience, in a process he described as a form of "experimental psychology". Alongside the actors he chose and the directorial decisions he made, Levy chose to shoot the majority of the film on location in London, utilising the urban environment with the belief that it would further enhance the emotional impact of the film. Filming started on 20 August in 1964, and took only eight months ending in April 1965.

=== Post-production ===
==== Editing ====
The film contains a number of montages and disjointed cuts as well two recurrent intercut sequences, one of a striptease and another of a cow being slaughtered, that are repeated five and eight times respectively through the film. These scenes provide the most prominent examples of Levy's editing style, which he utilised to convey thematic meaning and provide distinct emotional contexts to the audience. The film is also edited in a non-linear fashion with flash-forward sequences and sequences with no distinct timeline interwoven in the narrative of the film.

Other aspects of the film's editing are also designed specifically to develop an emotional impact. The film features a number of extended single shot scenes, and long black spacing between some cuts, which were included by Levy and the film's cinematographer Keith Allans in a further attempt to control the emotional impact of the film. These extended shots and black spacing were inspired by the concept of "rhythm" in the editing of films, and Levy's interest in how the rhythm of shots and the space between them can directly influence an audience's emotional response to a film.

==== Colour ====
Levy and cinematographer Keith Allans also worked heavily on the colour of the film, with almost all the film's scenes containing some form of colour correction or change in exposure. In an interview before the release of the film Levy stated that "The colour is very closely controlled and tied to the film’s emotional forces".

== Release ==
The film was initially released at a screening at the Institute of Contemporary Arts, London, in 1968, and was then screened at a number of festivals across Europe through the rest of the year. Apart from showings in minor independent cinemas throughout Europe the film had no widespread release until 2009, when it was released on DVD by the British Film Institute's Flipside strand alongside a number of Levy's other smaller films.

== Critical reception ==
=== Initial reception ===
The initial screening of the film was well received by the limited audience at the Institute of Contemporary Arts, however due to the limited release reviews from the original screenings are mostly limited to those of film critics. In a review for The Monthly Film Bulletin, Jan Dawson describes Herostratus as a "passionate, exhausting, and disturbing film", and specifically criticises the film's emotional impact as being "more often the result of physical assault than artistic subtlety" although she does praise the film's cinematography. Other reviews of the film from its original release are more favourable. A review in The Boston Globe describes it as "a joy to see", and "beautifully crafted in terms of precision and skill", and while one from the Los Angeles Times does criticise the film's "long 145-minute" runtime as "a taxing workout" it also praises Levy's "utterly inspired, exhaustive use of the camera's resources to allow us to experience the emotions of his tortured hero". A review in 1968 for The Sydney Morning Herald titled "Dr. Levy Shakes Up the Critics" describes many critics having strongly divided opinions on the film, and ultimately concludes that ""Herostratus" is strictly a festival film".

=== Modern reception ===
Upon the film's re-release a number of critics favourably reflected upon the film and its place as an influence and inspiration for many other, more widely known, films. Critic Amnon Buchbinder describes the film as being "pillaged for ideas by several films shot after it but released before it – not to mention many others made subsequently", while other reviews from the film's release also suggest that scenes from prominent films such as A Clockwork Orange were inspired by Herostratus.

Modern critics have also criticised the film's treatment and portrayal of women, and highlighted misogynistic undercurrents to the film's narrative. J. J. May, in his analysis of the film, highlights that nearly all the female characters in the film are portrayed as sex-workers of some kind and criticises the "free-floating misogyny" in the film's treatment of these characters. He particularly discusses Clio, and argues that unlike Farson whose actions are forgiven as a product of his social structure, Clio is "held up as responsible for not only Max's undoing, but her own too". In her review of the film Amy Taubin similarly criticises the film's "unexamined, rampant misogyny", and in particular the way in which the film's female characters are often characterised as "one demonically seductive presence".
