= Arthur of the Britons =

British TV series (1972–1973)

- Series DVD Cover
- Genre: Docudrama
- Starring: Oliver Tobias; Brian Blessed; Michael Gothard; Jack Watson; Rupert Davies; Gila von Weitershausen; Georg Marischka; Clive Revill; Peter Stephens
- Country of origin: United Kingdom
- Original language: English
- No. of series: 2
- No. of episodes: 24

Production
- Producer: HTV

Original release
- Network: ITV
- Release: 1972 – 1973

Arthur of the Britons is a British television show about the historical King Arthur. Produced by the HTV regional franchise, it consisted of two series, released between 1972 and 1973. ITV had already a reputation for entertaining historical TV shows that would display adventure and swordplay, such as The Adventures of the Scarlet Pimpernel (1956), The Adventures of Robin Hood (1955), The Adventures of Sir Lancelot (1956), Ivanhoe (1958) and Sir Francis Drake (1961). Like Richard Lionheart in the TV shows about Robin Hood and Ivanhoe this King Arthur shows greatness by making peace between the two foremost peoples in the England of his era. The looks of King Arthur and his brother-in-arms Kai resemble contemporary rockstars. Arthur of the Britons was broadcast repeatedly on numerous local ITV stations during the 1970s and 1980s.

The theme music was by Elmer Bernstein.

== Plot ==
Set in the Dark Ages a century after the Roman withdrawal from Britain and during the Anglo-Saxon settlement of Britain, Arthur is not a glamorous king with an elaborate court; instead, he is (as presumed by some historians) just a Celtic leader who installs and maintains a Celtic alliance against the Saxon invaders. He is instructed by his adoptive father Llud and assisted by Kai, a Saxon orphan reared as Arthur's brother. His greatest rival is his cousin, Mark of Cornwall. The Jute chief Yorath and his daughter Rowena are in the beginning allies against the Saxons but finally use their special position to mediate peace negotiations between the Celts and the Saxons. Cerdig, chieftain of the Saxons, is Arthur's principal counterpart who in the episode "The Treaty" even insults him as a man "with many brothers but no father" but learns to respect him in the end.

The series dispenses with the legendary Round Table and popular figures such as Merlin, Guinevere and Lancelot and attaches no significance to magic or superstition. Neither Arthur nor his fellow celts are at any time clad in shining armour. Arthur is once again portrayed as a skilled fighter but especially as a cunning politician who eventually comes to good terms with the Saxons. After he has created the basics for a peaceful coexistence between his folk and the Saxons, he falls in love with a Roman princess (last episode, "The Girl From Rome") called Benedicta (portrayed by Catherine Schell) who wants to live with him in Rome. But Arthur refuses to leave the land and people he loves, and she leaves along with her escort, though it is hinted that she may return.

== Depiction of various elements ==
=== A Celtic King Arthur ===
While some films about him avoid the question of his origin and show Arthur as a man who defends Christian Britain against heathen barbarians out of a sense of integrity, this TV show portrays him as one of the Celtic Britons who held territories in Britain before the invasions by the Romans (1st century A.D.), Anglo-Saxons (5th century A.D.) and Normans (11th century A.D.), and so Arthur is shown as a Celtic leader defending his homeland.

=== Depiction of Celts ===
The Celts are portrayed as a self-sufficient people who make their living through cattle breeding and hunting. They are very capable equestrians, who can kill wild boar from horseback. Besides that, they inhabit villages that are fortified with palisades. (In "The Pupil" and "Daughter of the King" the outside of Arthur's Celtic village is shown.) That is how they are defined as Celts.

=== Depiction of Saxons ===
The Saxons are portrayed as farmers who clear the land for cultivation of grain. They are also experienced in using wood to build ships. Their villages are in the middle of their fields and they are not fortified, since they can recognise approaching enemies earlier than the Celts who live in glades. ("The Gift of Life" and the flashbacks in "The Prisoner" provide an impression of Saxon villages.) The Saxons are brave footsoldiers but they are defeated by even a smaller number of Celts if they fight as cavalrymen. (As demonstrated in "The Duel".) So instead of invading Britain they just infiltrate it as clans (and that is how Arthur describes it in "The Challenge"), fighting with Celtic clans for places that suffice to make a living as farmers.

=== Culture clash between Celts and Saxons ===
The Celts and Saxons are defined by their cultures and their conflict derives from their different ways of life. The Celts feel robbed because the Saxons destroy their hunting grounds (as Kai explains to a Saxon girl in the fifth episode, called "People of the Plough") and the Saxons react to the hostility of the Celts (as explained in the second episode "The Gift of Life", where the Saxons bring Kai to trial, accusing him of being a traitor). It is not about Christianity, because on both sides there are Christians as well as adepts of other religions such as Mithraism. (In the first episode, called "Arthur is dead", the gathered Celtic leaders beseech their gods to help them to tackle a task. Also, in the fourth episode, named "The Penitent Invader", a Christian Celtic leader asks Arthur to help him with another Christian Celtic chieftain, who unfortunately became an unbearable hypocrite and is eventually dealt with by Llud who uses a remedy that according to him was part of Mithraism.) Neither is it simply a conflict between good and evil because there are also pacifists on either side. (In the aforementioned episode "People of the Plough", Kai mets a pacifist Saxon and in the eighth episode "Rolf the Preacher", a whole Celtic village turns to pacifism.)

=== Arthur's role in the conflict ===
Arthur seeks to forge an effective Celtic alliance in spite of religious differences, rivalry and sheer animosity among the leaders. He cannot trust in druids, clairvoyants or fairies because they exist in his world no more than in ours. Instead it is all political realism. Still this Arthur is also noble or at least fair. When Saxon children have lost their way they will be brought back to their families by his Saxon friend Kai, when the Saxon lose their cattle because of a disease he will offer him a part of his livestock (episode "In Common Cause") and when one of his allies takes Saxons as slaves ("Some Saxon Women") he will talk him out of it. While defending the borders of the remaining Celtic area he prepares from a position of strength a peaceful coexistence. The TV series is composed accordingly, alternating episodes about sustaining the alliance with episodes that show Celtic-Saxon harmonisation. Once Arthur has accomplished his political goals and provided the grounds for peace, he indulges himself to the pursuit of personal happiness.

=== An atypically hopeful ending ===
Many iterations of Arthurian legend end with Arthur's death or severe wounding by Mordred's hand at the Battle of Camlann. In Arthur of the Britons however, Arthur does not die, nor does he have to be taken to Avalon for healing. In the penultimate episode, under threat of attack by the Scots, Arthur comes close to securing a treaty between himself, Cerdig and Yorath the Jute, but a carelessly placed target board results in a death, and old hostilities quickly re-surface. Arthur and his men return home, disappointed but still hopeful that one day, there will be a lasting peace.

== Cast ==
- Oliver Tobias as Arthur, Chief of the Celts
- Michael Gothard as Kai
- Jack Watson as Llud the Silver-Handed
- Brian Blessed as Mark of Cornwall
- Rupert Davies as Cerdig, Chief of the Saxons
- Georg Marischka as Yorath, Chief of the Jutes
- Gila von Weitershausen as Rowena of the Jutes
- Clive Revill as Rolf the Preacher
- Peter Stephens as Amlodd
- Michael Craig as Kurk

== Episodes ==
=== Series 1 (1972–1973) ===
- Arthur is Dead (Arthur's alleged death brings all Celtic leaders together.)
- The Gift of Life (Two little Saxons cause that Kai visits a Saxon village.)
- The Challenge (The rivalry between two Celtic leaders endangers the Celtic defence.)
- The Penitent Invader (The Picts turn out being the real danger for the Celts.)
- People of the Plough (Kai teams up with a pacifistic Saxon to outsmart a greedy Celt.)
- The Duel (The rivalry among the Celts leads endangers again an action against Saxons.)
- The Pupil (A young Celt asks Arthur for combat training and wants to kill Arthur.)
- Rolf the Preacher (For a change the Celtic alliance is weakened by pacifism.)
- Enemies and Lovers (Arthur and Kai are suspected being Saxon spies.)
- The Slaves (With help of Kai and a Saxon girl Arthur can free Celtic prisoners)
- The Wood People (Homeless Celts are eventually accepted as allies against Saxon intruders.)
- The Prize (The heroes travel masked as Saxons in a Saxon boat through Saxon territory, .)

=== Series 2 (1973) ===
- The Swordsman (A rival Celtic chieftain tricks Arthur into a dangerous duel.)
- Rowena (Arthur escorts a princess of the Germanic Jutes to her Celtic groom.)
- The Prisoner (Kai hides a Saxon who turns out to be his former best friend.)
- Some Saxon Women (Arthur manages to rescue Saxon girls from being sold into slavery.)
- Go Warily (An old Celtic feud threatens Arthur and his friends.)
- The Marriage Feast (Arthur prevents Mark of Cornwall from becoming too mighty for the alliance.)
- In Common Cause (The Saxons lose their livestock because of a disease but Arthur helps them.)
- Six Measures of Silver (An old friend of Llud causes trouble among the Celts.)
- Daughter of the King (Arthur tries to force another Celtic leader into his alliance.)
- The Games (The Celtic Games cause tensions between the competing Celtic allies.)
- The Treaty (Arthur meets his Saxon counterpart, to discuss fighting new invaders together.)
- The Girl from Rome (Arthur has a brief romance with a stranded Roman princess.)

DVD cover

== Feature film and home media ==
In 1975, the series was edited into a 90-minute feature film, King Arthur, the Young Warlord. The complete series was released on DVD in 2008, by Network. While the movie is available in the US and the UK, the series is only available in the UK.

== Syndication outside UK ==
Arthur of the Britons was aired in Brazil as Rei Artur (King Arthur), simultaneously to its original release in the UK. In France, it was Le Roi des Celtes (King of Celts), and in Germany, König Arthur. It was never aired in the United States.

== See also ==
- List of works based on Arthurian legends
