= James Hanley (novelist) =

British novelist (1897–1985)

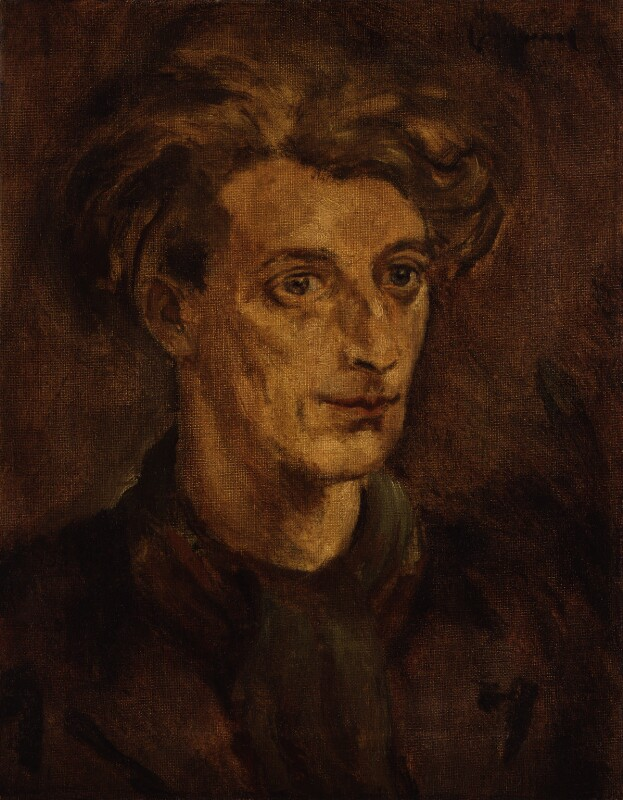
- Hanley c. 1930s
- Born: 3 September 1897; Kirkdale, Liverpool, Lancashire, England
- Died: 11 November 1985 (aged 88); London, England
- Resting place: Llanfechain, Powys, Wales
- Occupations: Novelist, playwright, radio and television dramatist, and short story writer
- Spouse: Dorothy Enid "Timothy" Thomas (née Heathcote)
- Writing career
- Notable works: Boy, The Furys, The Closed Harbour, Levine
- Movements: Expressionism, Modernism, English literature, Welsh literature in English

James (Joseph) Hanley (3 September 1897 – 11 November 1985) was a British novelist, short story writer, and playwright from Kirkdale, Liverpool, Lancashire, of Irish descent. Hanley came from a seafaring family and spent two years at sea himself, during World War I. He published his first novel Drift in 1930. In the 1930s and 1940s his novels and short stories focussed on seamen and their families, and included Boy (1931), the subject of an obscenity trial. After World War II there was less emphasis on the sea in his works. While frequently praised by critics, Hanley's novels did not sell well. In the late 1950s, 1960s, and early 1970s he wrote plays, mainly for the BBC, for radio and then for television, and also for the theatre. He returned to the novel in the 1970s. His last novel, A Kingdom, was published in 1978, when he was eighty. His brother Gerald was also a novelist.

== Biography ==
Born in Kirkdale, Liverpool, Lancashire, in 1897 (not Dublin, nor 1901 as he generally implied) to a working-class family. Both his parents were, on the other hand, born in Ireland, his father Edward Hanley around 1865, in Dublin, and his mother, Bridget Roache, in Queenstown, County Cork, around 1867. However, both were "well established in Liverpool by 1891", when they were married. Hanley's father worked most of his life as a stoker, particularly on Cunard liners, and other relatives had also gone to sea. James also grew up living close to the docks. He left school in the summer of 1910 and worked for four years in an accountants' office. Then early in 1915, during the First World War aged 17 he went to sea for the first time (not 13 as he again implied). Thus life at sea was a formative influence and much of his early writing is about seamen.

Then, in April 1917, Hanley jumped ship in Saint John, New Brunswick, Canada, and shortly thereafter joined the Canadian Army in Fredericton, New Brunswick. Hanley fought in France in the summer of 1918, but was invalided out shortly thereafter. After the war he worked as a railway porter in Bootle and he devoted himself "to a prodiguous range of autodidactic, high cultural activities – learning the piano, regularly attending […] concerts […] reading voraciously and, above all, writing." However, it was not until 1930 that his novel Drift was accepted.

Hanley moved from Liverpool to near Corwen, North Wales in 1931, where he met Dorothy Enid "Timothy" Thomas, née Heathcote, a descendant of Lincolnshire nobility. They lived together and had a child, Liam Powys Hanley, in 1933, but did not marry until 1947. As World War II was approaching, in July 1939, Hanley moved to London, to write documentaries and plays for the BBC, but he moved back to Wales, to Llanfechain, the other side of the Berwyn Mountains from Corwen, in the early years of the war, where he remained until 1963, when the Hanleys moved to North London, close to their son Liam.

Hanley published an autobiographical work, Broken Water: An Autobiographical Excursion in 1937, and while this generally presents a true overall picture of his life, it is seriously flawed, incomplete and inaccurate. Chris Gostick describes it as "a teasing palimpsest of truth and imagination".

Hanley's brother was the novelist Gerald Hanley and his nephew the American novelist and playwright William Hanley. James Hanley's wife also published three novels, as Timothy Hanley. She died in 1980. James Hanley himself died in 1985. He was buried in Llanfechain, Wales.

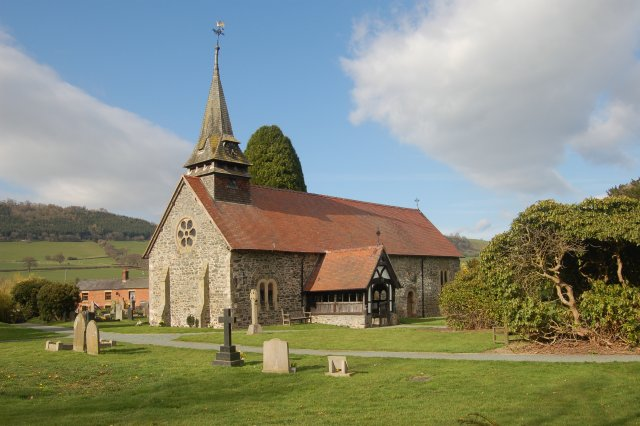
St. Garmon's Church Llanfechain. The Hanleys lived in Llanfechain from December 1940 until 1963, and Hanley was buried there.

== Works ==
=== 1930s and 1940s ===
Hanley's first publication, the novel Drift (1930), was written under the influence of James Joyce. (Note: As a quotation blurb on the cover of the cheap edition of 1932 underlines: "The portraits of Joe Rourke and his mother are, indeed, two of the most profound expressions of the Catholic soul I have yet seen; truer and finer, in my opinion, than anything in Joyce's A Portrait of an Artist or the vicious caricatures of Liam O'Flaherty". London: Joiner and Steele, 1932. A quotation from The Referee.) While Drift is about an Irish Catholic family, the setting is Liverpool, and in the 1930s Hanley wrote largely about the Irish community in Liverpool, especially with the semi-autobiographical novels about the Fury family, The Furys (1935), The Secret Journey (1936), and Our Time is Gone (1940), as well as Ebb and Flood (1932). Hanley's novels of the 1930s and 1940s also focus on life at sea. Hanley wrote two further novels about the Furys of Liverpool, Winter Song (1950), and An End and a Beginning (1958), though Irish and especially Roman Catholic characters continue to have a significant role throughout most of Hanley's career.

James Hanley consistently explored the lives of men and women in extremes, that is in dramatically precarious states of fear and isolation, which tend to lead to violence and madness. A grim early example is in the novella The Last Voyage (1931). John Reilly is a fireman who is still working only because he has lied about his age, and now faces his last voyage. Reilly although he is in his mid-sixties has a young family, and therefore the family will have to live on his inadequate pension. In another sense this is Reilly's last voyage, because despairing as to the future he throws himself into the ship's furnace: "Saw all his life illuminated in those flames. 'Not much for us. Sweat, sweat. Pay off. Sign on. Sweat, sweat. Pay off. Finish. Ah, well!".

In Boy (1931) young Fearon's isolation and suffering arise because no one cares for him. The story of Boy is "sordid and horrible". The young protagonist's parents are only interested in the wages he can earn, and encourage him to leave school as soon as possible. Likewise society is unconcerned about the harsh, unhealthy conditions he endures cleaning ships' boilers. Then, when he goes to sea, he is sexually abused by his fellow seamen. Finally, when young Fearon is dying in agony from a venereal disease caught in a Cairo brothel, his Captain smothers him.

Boy was reprinted in 1931, and 1932, when an American first edition was also published. Then, when it was reprinted in 1934, in a cheap (second) edition with a "scantily dressed" belly dancer on its cover, Boy was prosecuted for obscenity. The court case followed a complaint to the police in Bury, near Manchester, Lancashire: "The prosecution suggested that the cover of the book and extracts from reviews just inside were most suggestive, and that the purpose was to pollute young people's minds". The publishers Boriswood "were advised that, owing to the book's reference to 'intimacy between members of the male sex', any defence against prosecution was futile'". In March 1935 Boriswood pleaded guilty of "uttering and publishing an obscene libel" and paid a substantial fine.

Subsequently Boy was republished by the Obelisk Press in Paris in 1935 and 1946. Jack Kahane owner of this company was a noted publisher of banned books in English, including Henry Miller's Tropic of Cancer and Lady Chatterley's Lover. Other editions followed, including one by Penguin Books in 1992, with an introduction by Anthony Burgess and most recently, in 2007, by Oneworld Classics.

It is not surprising that Hanley should show an interest in extreme situations, given his early awareness of the precariousness of life in the working class world that he came from. Hanley would also have sensed, very early in his life, that individual lives of the working poor and their children was of little value in a modern industrial city like Liverpool. All this encouraged his exploration not only of working class life but also the emotional life of characters on the periphery of society.

There is an exploration of another type of extreme situation in those works of Hanley which deal with a shipwreck, such as "Narrative" (1931), and the World War II novels The Ocean (1941), Sailor's Song (1943), though these extreme situations are undergone by groups of men, and "were primarily inspiriting in their representation of maritime heroism".

=== After World War II ===
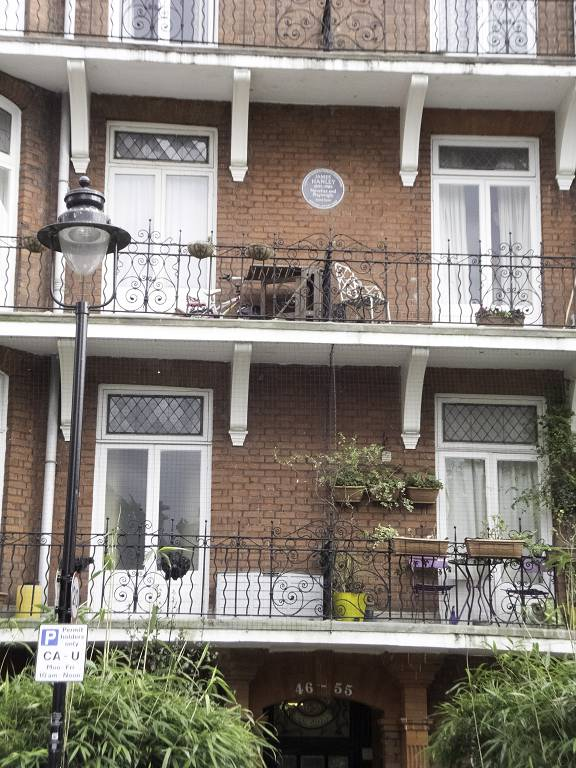
James Hanley's London home.

In the 1950s he wrote some of "his finest novels", Closed Harbour (1952), The Welsh Sonata (1954), Levine (1956), and An End and a Beginning (1958), the final volume of the Furys sequence. Characters in extreme situations is also the subject these novels of Hanley's maturity, where the male protagonists, following some trauma, are both unemployed and isolated from family and society.

Hanley's protagonists tend to be solitary figures and his concern is with loneliness, rootlessness, violence and madness and "he was never a political novelist or propagandist". He described himself as an anarchist, in a statement sent to International Pen. "I have been labelled a 'Proletarian writer' [… which] is to be party to more than one quite absurd theory, one of which is that only one section society is evil, and only one section capable of soaring; this message comes out of Communist vacuums […] My whole attitude is anarchial (sic), I do not believe in the State at all ".

In the 1960s, because of his lack of financial success as a novelist, Hanley turned to writing plays for radio, television, and occasionally the theatre. While he wrote mostly for the BBC, his plays were also produced in several other countries, including the CBC in Canada. Hanley's play Say Nothing was on stage for a month at the Theatre Royal, Stratford East in 1962 and off Broadway, New York, in 1965, while Inner Journey was on stage in Hamburg in 1966, as well as New York's Lincoln Center for a month in 1969.

Hanley returned to the novel form in the 1970s, publishing Another World, A Woman in the Sky (1973), A Dream Journey (1976) and The Kingdom (1978), all of which "were positively received". Several of Hanley's later novels were derived from earlier plays.

Hanley also frequently published short stories and book reviews, throughout his career, and some of these stories were subsequently collected and published in book form.

== Subject matter ==
=== War fiction ===
Hanley experienced both World Wars. He served in the merchant navy during World War I from early in 1915 until he deserted to join the Canadian Army late April 1917. He was demobilized in the Spring of 1919. Hanley only briefly experienced frontline conflict in 1918 and was soon after invalided out. He was also in London at the beginning of the World War II during the Blitz of 1940–1. Hanley deals with his First World War experiences, on the battlefield, in his novella, The German Prisoner, and his experience in the merchant navy, on a ship commandeered by the British Admiralty to serve as a troopship, in works like the novella "Narrative" (1931), and his novel The Hollow Sea (1938). These experiences are also dealt with in Hanley's non-fiction work, Broken Water: An Autobiographical Excursion (1937).

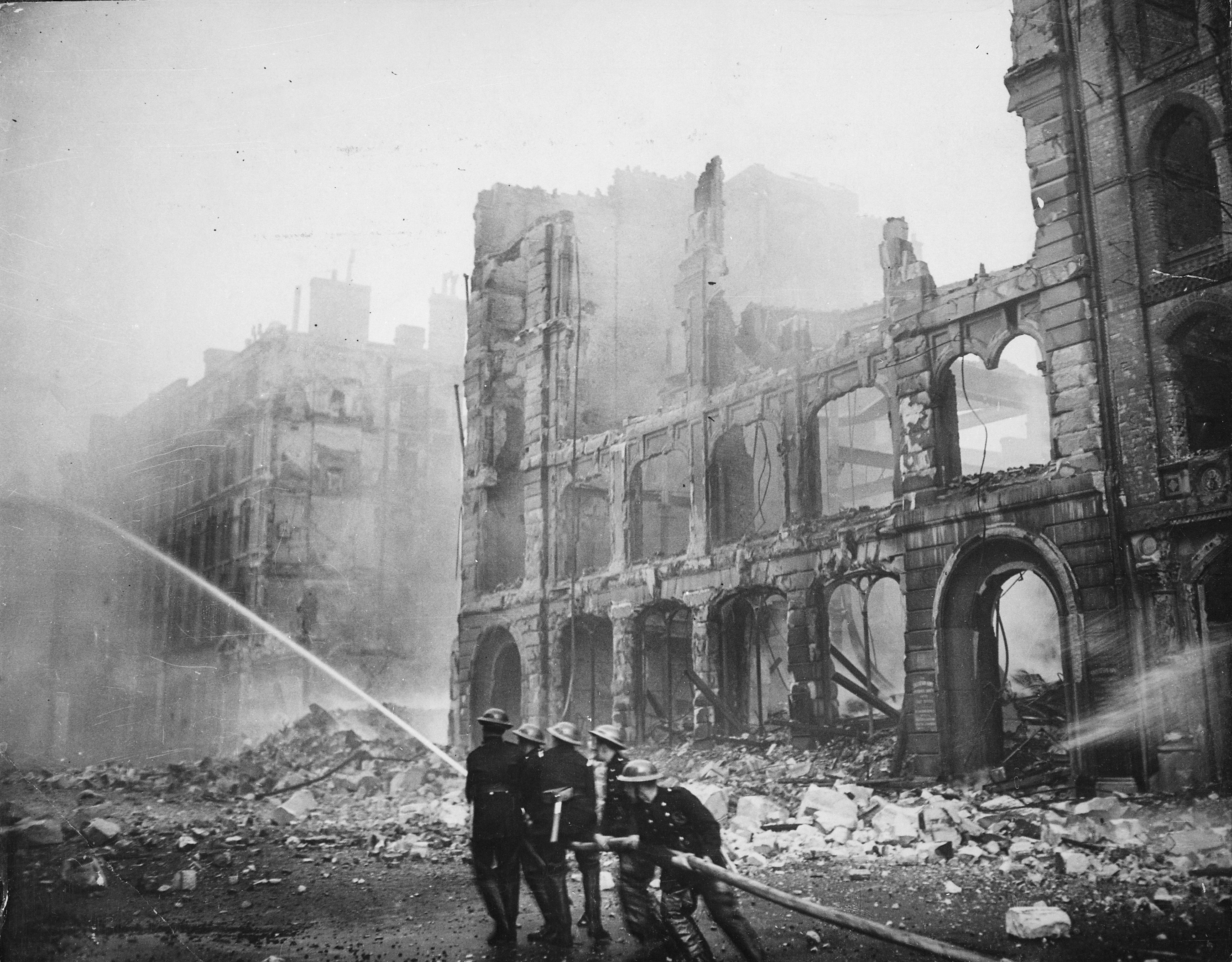
The London Blitz 1941

He uses both his earlier merchant navy experience, as well as the Blitz, in subsequent novels and short stories in the 1940s and 1950s. The Hanleys left Wales in July 1939 and led "an unsettled, almost nomadic existence" part of which was spent in London, and, while living in Chelsea, in August 1940 they "experienced the Blitz at first hand". Finally, January 1941, they returned to Wales, taking up residence in Llanfechain, Powys.

The third novel in Hanley's The Furys Chronicle, Our Time is Gone, was published in 1940, and takes place in middle of the First World War, between in November 1915, and September 1916". The action takes place mostly in Gelton. The father Denny Fury has returned to the sea, "as a stoker on a liner that has been taken over as a troopship," and Desmond Fury is a captain in the army. Peter Fury is serving a fifteen-year prison sentence for his murder of Mrs Ragner. However, John Fordham comments on the fact that Our Time is Gone "discloses a surprisingly non-belligerent tone for a Second World War novel" and the "unprecedented" for a novel published during a war "central heroism of Joseph Kilkey" who is a conscientious objector.

Two other works published during World War II, The Ocean (1941) and Sailor's Song (1943), explore "virtually identical" situations, that involve ships that have "been torpedoed and sunk mid-ocean". This is a similar plot to that of the conclusion of the earlier novella "Narrative", which is set during the previous war. Hanley also published, in 1943, No Directions, which is set during the London Blitz, a work that has been commented on by several literary critics. He later re-used this novel, to form the middle section of A Dream Journey (1976). Hanley had initially planned on turning No Directions into a trilogy.

War also has a role in several of his post Second World War novels, including Emily (1948), The Closed Harbour (1952), and Levine (1956). The eponymous protagonist of Emily meets her husband, who is on leave after spending four years away fighting the Japanese in Burma, at Paddington Station. Their home and all their possessions were destroyed in the Blitz, while it has "mentally shattered" their elder son. The Closed Harbour is set in Marseille during World War II, after Germany's defeat of France, and the protagonist Eugene Marius has lost a ship in a minefield, and all but one of his crew, including his nephew drowned. As a result of this he has lost his captain's ticket and cannot find work. After months of unemployment Marius eventually descends into madness.

Levine is set in England during the same war. Though the story begins with Felix Levine witnessing the murder of his mother and abduction of his sister, when Poland is invaded in 1939. Following this he leads a rootless life as a sailor. Then he is shipwrecked and spends time in an internment camp in southern England, before escaping. Levine then encounters Grace Helling, a forty-five year old virgin, who has been freed from her controlling Catholic parents, when they are killed in London by a German bomb. Felix is half her age. This novel, like The Closed Harbour and many of Hanley's novels, has a tragic climax, with Levine murdering Grace.

Edward Stokes also notes that two post-war short stories collections, Crilley and Other Stories (1945) and A Walk in the Wilderness (1950), deal with the impact of war on peoples lives.

=== Works set in Wales ===
Hanley lived a large part of his writing life, from 1931 until 1963, in Wales, and wrote several works with a Welsh setting and subject matter. The first full length work was Grey Children: A Study in Humbug and Misery (1937). The subject matter of this non-fiction work, unemployment in industrial South Wales, though has more in common with Hanley's novels of the 1930s about the struggles of working class Liverpudleians. In genre Grey Children belongs with George Orwell's The Road to Wigan Pier, published earlier in 1937.

However, Hanley lived in Wales for over twenty years before he wrote at length about rural Wales, where he lived. This came in 1953, with the publication of "Anatomy of Llangyllwch", in Don Quixote Drowned. Here Hanley uses the fictional name "Llangyllwch" for his fictional portrait of the village Llanfechain, where the Hanleys moved in the early 1940s. This is on the other side of the Berwyn Mountains from Corwen, close to the English border.

A local character from Llanfechain was also the source of the central character, Rhys, in The Welsh Sonata (1954), which was Hanley's first full-length novel with a Welsh setting. This novel marks an important step forward in Hanley's attempt to give form to his feelings about Wales. The Welsh Sonata is narrated from the perspective of Welsh characters, and Hanley occasional uses Welsh words, and he employs, at times, a poetic style.

Almost twenty years after The Welsh Sonata, in 1972, Hanley's second Welsh novel, Another World appeared. Hanley's third Welsh novel, A Kingdom (1978), published "remarkably" when he was 80, was his last novel. As he had been living in North London since 1963, this is very much written at a distance. There is a suggestion of the influence of the austere poetry of Hanley's friend, Welsh poet-priest, R. S. Thomas in this "elegiac evocation of hill-farm life".

== Reputation ==
Following Hanley's death in 1985 there has been the occasional reprinting, including, by Harvill The Last Voyage and Other Stories (1997) and The Ocean (1999); and more recently by OneWorld Classics, Boy (2007) and The Closed Harbour (2009), both with new biographical information provided by Chris Gostick. Several titles are also available from Fabers reprints on demand service. In 2013 Parthian Books published A Kingdom in their series "Library of Wales".

Hanley's works have been translated into a number of languages, including French, German, Dutch, Spanish and Swedish. This includes his play Inner Journey that was performed in Hamburg, Germany with the title Für Immer und Ewig in September 1966. A Finnish version of his play Say Nothing was produced by the Finnish National Theatre.

In September 2001, to mark what was then believed to be the centennial of James Hanley's birth, a one-day symposium was held at Jesus College, Cambridge. Another important landmark was the publication in 2002 of John Fordham's James Hanley: Modernism and the Working Class by the University of Wales Press, which amongst other things suggests that Hanley is not simply a realist or naturalist, but because of his use of expressionistic techniques, should be seen as a modernist. Fordham's study also contains new biographical material.

Hanley never achieved major success as a writer, even though he often received favourable reviews, both in Britain and America and counted amongst his admirers E.M. Forster, T. E. Lawrence, Anthony Burgess, and Henry Green. In 1999 Doris Lessing described The Ocean as "a great novel". John Cowper Powys in his "Preface" to James Hanley's Men in Darkness (1931), comments: "There are few people who could read these powerful and terrible tales without being strongly affected" (ix). And more recently Alberto Manguel questions: "Why one of the major 20th-century writers should have suffered such a fickle fate is a question to which, no doubt, modern readers will have to answer to the sound of the Author's final trumpets".

A dramatised version of Boy was broadcast on BBC Radio 3's "Sunday Play" on 16 March 1996, and The Furys was serialized on BBC Radio, February/March 2001. It was dramatized for radio and broadcast on BBC Radio 4 FM, 2 March 2001. In 2016 BBC Cymru Wales broadcast in the series 15 Minute Drama, titled "Writing the Century: The Hanleys" on James Hanley and his wife, dramatised by Lizzie Nunnery and directed by Janine H. Jones. The five episodes were based on almost weekly letters from the Hanleys to their son Liam.

== Bibliography ==
All works published in London, England, unless indicated otherwise

=== Novels ===
- Drift, The Scholartis Press, 1930
- Boy, Boriswood, 1931; Penguin, 1992; Oneworld, 2007
- Ebb and Flood, The Bodley Head, 1932
- Captain Bottell, Boriswood, 1933
- Resurrexit Dominus, privately printed, London 1934
- The Furys, Chatto & Windus, 1935 (The Furys Chronicle I); Penguin, 1992; Faber & Faber, 2009
- Stoker Bush, Chatto & Windus, 1935
- The Secret Journey, Chatto & Windus, 1936 (The Furys Chronicle II); Faber & Faber, 2009
- Hollow Sea, The Bodley Head, 1938
- Our Time is Gone, The Bodley Head, 1940 (The Furys Chronicle III); Faber & Faber, 2009
- The Ocean, Faber & Faber, 1941; Harvill Press, 1999
- No Directions, Faber & Faber, 1943; André Deutsch, 1990
- Sailor's Song, Nicholson & Watson, 1943
- What Farrar Saw, Nicholson & Watson, 1946
- Emily, Nicholson & Watson, 1948
- Winter Song, Phoenix House, 1950 (The Furys Chronicle IV); Faber & Faber, 2009
- A House in the Valley, [as Patric Shone] Jonathan Cape, 1951 (as Against the Stream, Andre Deutsch, 1981).
- The Closed Harbour, Macdonald, 1952; Oneworld, 2009
- The Welsh Sonata: Variations on a Theme, Derek Verschoyle, 1954
- Levine, Macdonald, 1956
- An End and a Beginning, Macdonald, 1958 (The Furys Chronicle V); André Deutsch, 1990; Faber & Faber, 2009
- Say Nothing, Macdonald, 1962
- Another World, André Deutsch, 1972
- A Woman in the Sky, André Deutsch, 1973
- Dream Journey, André Deutsch, 1976
- A Kingdom, André Deutsch, 1978; Parthian Books, 2013

=== Novellas ===
- The German Prisoner, Privately printed, 1930
- A Passion Before Death, Privately printed, 1930
- The Last Voyage, Joiner and Steele, 1931
- Stoker Haslett, A Tale, Joiner and Steele, 1932
- Quartermaster Clausen, The White Owl Press, 1934
- At Bay, Grayson & Grayson, 1935

=== Short stories ===
- The Darkness, Covent Garden Press, 1973
- Lost, Vancouver, Canada: William Hoffer, 1979

=== Short story collections ===
- Men in Darkness: Five Stories, with Preface by John Cowper Powys, The Bodley Head, 1931 [Narrative; Feud; John Muck; Rubbish; Greaser Anderson]
- Aria and Finale (three novellas), Boriswood, 1932 [Aria & Finale (A Sketch for a Novel); The Last Voyage; Stoker Haslett]
- Half an Eye: Sea Stories, The Bodley Head, 1937
- People Are Curious, The Bodley Head, 1938
- At Bay and Other Stories, Faber & Faber, 1944 [Beyond The Horizon; Jacob; The Butterfly; The Brothers; People Are Curious; At Bay; The Tale; Fog; The Sea; Brother Geoffrey]
- Crilley and Other Stories Nicholson & Watson, 1945 [The Lost Sailor; Between Six And Seven; Mrs Ogden; The Burden; The Brothers; Fancy Free; Duet]
- Selected Stories, Dublin, Maurice Fridberg, 1947 [Afternoon At Miss Fetch's; Lofty; The Tale; The World Laughs; It Has Never Ended; Fancy Free; Brother Geoffrey; Wound up; Sitting Royal]
- Walk in the Wilderness, Phoenix House, 1950 [A Walk in the Wilderness; Afterwards; The Road; Another World; It Has Never Ended]
- Collected Stories, Macdonald, 1953
- What Farrar Saw and Other Stories, André Deutsch, 1984
- The Last Voyage and Other Stories Harvill, 1997 [The Last Voyage; The German Prisoner; Greaser Anderson; A Passion Before Death; Narrative]

=== Non-fiction ===
- Grey Children: A Study in Humbug and Misery, Methuen, 1937
- Between the Tides (essays), Methuen, 1939

=== Autobiography ===
- Broken Water: An Autobiographical Excursion, Chatto & Windus, 1937
- Don Quixote Drowned, Macdonald, 1953

=== Letters ===
- Hanley, James and Powys, John Cowper. Powys and Lord Jim: The Letters of James Hanley and John Cowper Powys. Edited with an Introduction by Chris Gostick. The Powys Press, 2018

=== Published plays ===
- The Inner Journey: A Play in Three Acts, Black Raven Press, 1965
- Plays One (The Inner Journey and A Stone Flower), Kaye & Ward, 1968

=== Works for radio and television ===
Selected: See Gibbs and BBC Archives for a fuller bibliography.

- Convoy (a documentary drama about merchant seamen). BBC Radio, 30 May 1941.
- Return to Danger (documentary). BBC Radio, 15 January 1942.
- Shadows before Sunrise (drama, about the Russian composer Moussorgsky). BBC Radio, Home Service, 6 December 1942.
- Winter's Journey (drama). CBC Radio (Canada), 29 January 1957.
- Gobbet (drama: Inner Journey was based on Gobbet)). BBC Radio, Third Programme, 6 October 1959.
- The Queen of Ireland (drama) BBC Third programme, 22 May 1960).
- Say Nothing (drama). BBC Radio, Third Programme, 25 April 1961.
- The Furys (drama) BBC Radio, North, Northern Ireland: a weekly serial from 21 September to 26 November 1961.
- Say Nothing (drama). BBC TV, 19 February 1964; CBC TV, 5 May 1965.
- Inner World of Miss Vaughn (drama, eventually became the novel, Another World). BBC TV, 1 April 1964.
- Another Port, Another Town (drama) Granada TV [London], 4 May 1964.
- One Way Only (drama: later became the novel Woman in the Sky). BBC Radio, Third Programme, 10 December 1967; CBC radio 8 December 1968.
- It Wasn't Me (drama) BBC TV, 17 December 1969.
- The Furys (based on the novel). Serialized on BBC Radio, February/March 2001.

=== Secondary Literature ===
- Paul Binding, "Reappraisal" in The Fiction Magazine, Spring 1983
- John Fordham, James Hanley: Modernism and the Working Class. Cardiff: University of Wales Press, 2002
- Linneae Gibbs, James Hanley: A Bibliography. Vancouver, Canada: William Hoffer, 1980
- Chris Gostick, "Extra Material on James Hanley's Boy". In the Oneworld Classics edition of Boy (2007). ISBN 978-1-84749-006-3
- Kristin Anderson, A Queer Sort: A Review of James Hanley's Boy. The Dublin Review of Books
- John Cowper Powys, "Preface" to Men in Darkness (1931)
- Edward Stokes, The Novels of James Hanley, Melbourne, Australia, F. W. Cheshire, 1964,
- Robin Wood, "This Soaring and Singing Land: James Hanley in Wales". International Journal of Welsh Writing in English, Volume 3, Number 1, October 2015, pp. 123–144. University of Wales Press

(secondary literature continued)

- Howard Slater Class Incognito: A Contemporary Appraisal of James Hanley's Work. Penniless Press, 2025
- Essay (1992) on James Hanley by Howard Slater at Penniless Press
- Essay on James Hanley's The German Prisoner, by Joseph Pridmore at Penniless Press
- James Hanley: The Anarchist Outside by Tony Wailey in North West Labour History Journal, No.49 (2024).

== Archives ==
=== Britain ===
- Liverpool City Library: A large number of letters to James Hanley, notably a major collection from John Cowper Powys, as well as small collections from T E Lawrence, E M Forster and Storm Jameson. Also a selection of press cuttings and a number of Hanley's books.
- National Library of Wales: A good selection of Hanley books, and an important collections of manuscripts and letters.
- University of London (The Sterling Library): A small but important collection of Hanley books, letters and manuscripts, including one of the few available UK copies of the early novel Resurrexit Dominus.
- The Powys Society Collection (Exeter University): Inscribed books from Hanley to various members of the Powys family, together with a small number of letters and manuscripts.

=== United States ===
- Bryn Mawr College: An unrivalled Hanley collection of books, letters and manuscripts, including almost the full correspondence between Hanley and Frank Harrington from the 1970s until Hanley's death in 1985.
- Harry Ransom Center: A large collection of Hanley letters and manuscripts.
- Temple University, Philadelphia: An important collection of Hanley BBC Radio and TV scripts, together with all the later letters from John Cowper Powys to Hanley.
- University of New York at Buffalo: A good collection of Hanley material, including copies of all the later letters between Hanley and Harrington not at Bryn Mawr.
- University of Northern Illinois: An important collection of Hanley books and manuscripts, together with a large number of letters from Hanley.

=== Canada ===
- The University of Toronto, Thomas Fisher Rare Book Library: Mainly books, and short stories and essays published in journals.
