= James Quinn (film administrator) =

British film festival founder (1919–2008)

- Born: James Charles Frederick Quinn; 23 August 1919; UK
- Died: 11 February 2008 (aged 88); UK
- Occupation: Executive producer

James Charles Frederick Quinn (23 August 1919 – 11 February 2008), was a British film administrator, producer and exhibitor.

During World War II he was a Major in the Intelligence Unit of the Irish Guards in North Africa.

He was educated at Rockport School in Holywood, Co Down.

He was best known as one of the longest-serving Directors of the British Film Institute (1955–1964). Under his leadership, the BFI inaugurated the new National Film Theatre under Waterloo Bridge in London (1957), launched the London Film Festival (1957), added television to its official remit, and initiated the regional expansion of the BFI.

In 1961 he was head of the jury at the 11th Berlin International Film Festival.

After his departure from the BFI, he acquired the Paris Pullman cinema in collaboration with independent distributor Charles Cooper (1967). In the 1970s he also ran the Minema cinema, still in London. He also produced two feature films: Don Levy's Herostratus (1967), and Stuart Cooper's Overlord (1975).
