= Don Levy =

Levy in 1965

Don Levy (born Donald Anthony Levy; 1932 – January 1987) was an Australian-born artist and filmmaker.

Levy was born in Bathurst, New South Wales, Australia, the elder brother of the ceramicist Colin Levy. While studying theoretical chemistry at the University of Sydney, he founded the Sydney University Art Group in collaboration with Ruth Hansman, a student of Darius Milhaud; Paul Hockings, a documentary filmmaker and critic; and Robert Hughes, later to be the art editor at Time magazine. Levy was awarded a research scholarship to the University of Cambridge, and there he obtained a PhD in theoretical chemical physics in 1960. While at Cambridge, Levy became involved in the Film Society and made his first short films. After Cambridge, he was awarded the first-ever film scholarship in Britain to study in the newly created Film Department of the Slade School of Fine Art under the leadership of filmmaker-turned-lecturer Thorold Dickinson. He then made a number of short films for the Nuffield Foundation, including the experimental documentary Time Is (1964).

In 1962, he obtained a filmmaking grant from the British Film Institute Experimental Film Fund for the production of an experimental feature film, Herostratus. The film, made on a shoestring budget, took over five years to be completed. It was co-financed by the BFI, the BBC, and former BFI Director James Quinn. It was released in May 1968, opening at the ICA in London and subsequently being screened at film festivals.

In 1968, Levy took up a position at the Carpenter Center for the Visual Arts at Harvard University, where he stayed for two years. He then moved to Los Angeles to work at the California Institute of the Arts until his death in 1987 by committing suicide.
