= Incest: From a Journal of Love =

1992 non-fiction book by Anaïs Nin

Incest
- First edition
- Author: Anaïs Nin
- Language: English
- Genre: Memoir, Diary
- Publisher: Harcourt
- Publication date: October 1992
- Media type: Print (Hardcover and Paperback)
- ISBN: 0151443661
- OCLC: 25629084
- Dewey Decimal: 818/.5203 B 20
- LC Class: PS3527.I865 Z465 1992
- Preceded by: Henry and June: From the Unexpurgated Diary of Anaïs Nin
- Followed by: Fire: From a Journal of Love: The Unexpurgated Diary of Anaïs Nin, 1934–1937

Incest: From a Journal of Love: The Unexpurgated Diary of Anaïs Nin (1932–1934) is a 1992 non-fiction book by Anaïs Nin. It is a continuation of the diary entries first published in Henry and June: From the Unexpurgated Diary of Anaïs Nin. It features Nin's relationships with writer Henry Miller, his wife June Miller, the psychoanalyst Otto Rank, her father Joaquín Nin, and her husband Hugh Parker Guiler. She also copied some of her correspondence with these people into her diary. Much of this book was written in English, although those of her letters which were originally written in French and Spanish were translated. Most of this diary takes place in France, particularly Clichy, Paris and Louveciennes.

This book is followed by Fire: From a Journal of Love: The Unexpurgated Diary of Anaïs Nin, 1934–1937.

== Plot summary ==
The book covers the conclusion of her and Henry's relationship with June, as well as her relationships with her analysts. Among other events, she re-establishes contact and begins a sexual relationship with her absent father Joaquín Nin, becomes pregnant with Miller's child and eventually has an abortion in her sixth month of pregnancy. She examines all of these events with a sharp eye through the filters of psychoanalysis, and herself becomes an experiment for psychoanalysis by symbolically appointing her husband Hugh Guiler as her father, Henry Miller as her husband, and her father as her lover.

== Influences ==
Nin was in the midst of the surrealism movement, the psychoanalysis movement, and the expatriate community in Paris, and these intellectual influences upon her are evident in her diary entries. As well as providing a personal record of events, her diaries also chronicle the writing of various works including the novella Djuna from Winter of Artifice and Alraune which was later titled House of Incest. She edited Henry Miller's famous novel Tropic of Cancer, over which she wielded considerable influence.

== Editions ==
Anaïs Nin first began publishing expurgated versions of The Diary of Anaïs Nin in 1966, omitting many details of her personal and love life. In 1986, after virtually everybody mentioned in her diaries had died, Rupert Pole, Nin's widower, began to publish what are now termed the "unexpurgated" versions of the diary. The "unexpurgated" versions of the diaries are more sexually frank than the versions published in the 1960s and 1970s, and provide a fuller picture of her life. The new material casts her incestuous relationship with her father and her relationship with Henry Miller in new light.
