= Henry and June (disambiguation) =

Henry and June may refer to:

- Henry and June, the first volume of the unexpurgated Diary of Anaïs Nin
  - Henry & June, the 1990 film based upon the above novel
- Henry and June, characters from the 1996 cartoon KaBlam!
