= Winter of Artifice =

1939 book by Anaïs Nin

Winter of Artifice, published in 1939, is Anaïs Nin's second published book of fiction, initially consisting of three novellas. One story was dropped and later replaced and the other two were rewritten and in one case retitled in later editions.

== 1939 Edition ==
1939 edition (publ. Obelisk Press)

The original edition was published in Paris and identified as The Winter of Artifice, though originally titled "Alraune" in her manuscripts. She wrote this novel simultaneously as the book depicting her incestuous relationship with her father, called at the time "The Double". This Paris version contained three novelettes: "Djuna", a story that was never again reprinted; "Lilith", whose title was changed to "Winter of Artifice" in future editions; and "The Voice", whose title remained the same but whose content was heavily revised over future editions.

"Djuna" is said to be a fictionalized version (what she referred to as 'caricatured') of the story eventually told in the portion of Nin's diary later published as Henry and June.

Most copies of this edition were lost at the time of the death of its publisher and the beginning of World War II.

== 1942 Edition ==
500 copies, hand printed by Anais and her lover Gonzalo Moré (as Gemor Press), with engravings by her husband Ian Hugo (Hugh or Hugo Guiler). It contained two stories: "Lilith", retitled "Winter of Artifice" and "The Voice".

== 1945 Edition ==

The two "Father" sections, "Stella" and "Winter of Artifice" show how her own father, though successful as a musician, was "a failure as a human being" and the source of much of the chaos in Anaïs's life. She resented critics calling it autobiographical, but changing the names hardly helped. One has only one father. Most of it is taken from the Incest and Fire sections of her diaries and polished.

Stella's exterior resembles the description of Anaïs's friend Luise Rainer in the Published Diaries. The plot is that because she had lost trust in love when her father left her family and because echoes of her love for her father clung to her, she avoided pain by choosing a superficial relationship with a Don Juan like her father. The events of Stella's love life are not from the Diaries, but most of the father's effects on Stella's personality are.

The third section, “The Voice”, is written in the form of a Surrealistic caricature of a Psychoanalytic practice in New York City. Anaïs had been in psychoanalysis two or three times, had briefly studied and practiced psychoanalysis and had love affairs with two of her psychoanalysts, at the time this was published. In addition to the Voice (a psychoanalyst), the main characters are Djuna and Lilith.

The cover drawings and illustrations are engravings by Ian Hugo, the artist name of Anaïs's (first) husband Hugh Parker Guiler.
