= Little Birds (short story collection) =

Book by Anaïs Nin

- First edition
- Author: Anaïs Nin
- Language: English
- Publisher: Harcourt Brace Jovanovich
- Publication date: 1979
- Publication place: United States
- Media type: Print (paperback)
- ISBN: 0-15-152761-X

Little Birds is Anaïs Nin's second published work of erotica, which appeared in 1979 two years after her death, but was apparently written in the early 1940s when she was part of a group "writing pornography for a dollar a day".

The book is a collection of thirteen short stories. The sexual topics covered are quite varied, ranging from pedophilia to lesbianism, but linked by an interest in female subjectivity and in the dialectic of discourse and intercourse. Many of the same characters that appear in Delta of Venus, her first published book of erotica, reappear here.

== Title and themes ==
The "little birds" of the title story refer both to the actual birds used by its exhibitionist protagonist to attract young schoolgirls to his attic, and (metaphorically) to the girls' flight when he finally exposes himself.

In other stories, Nin calls into question the objectifying tendencies of the male gaze; both male and female complicity in masochism; and the pornographic genre itself through her subtle subversion.

The contents of the book include a "Preface" and the thirteen short stories: "Little Birds", "The Woman on the Dune", "Lina", "Two Sisters", "Sirocco", "The Maja", "A Model", "The Queen", "Hilda and Rango", "The Chanchiquito", "Saffron", "Mandra", and "Runaway".

== Conditions of writing ==
While writing her erotica, and organising that of her fellow writers such as George Barker, Nin referred to herself jokingly as the "madam of this snobbish literary house of prostitution" for a client who examined sexual activity "to the exclusion of aspects which are the fuel that ignites it. Intellectual, imaginative, romantic, emotional." In her 1976 preface to Delta of Venus she said "I had a feeling that Pandora's box contained the mysteries of woman's sensuality, so different from man's and for which man's language was inadequate.... Here in the erotica I was writing to entertain, under pressure from a client who wanted me to 'leave out the poetry.' I believed that my style was derived from a reading of men's works. For this reason I long felt that I had compromised my feminine self. I put the erotica aside. Rereading it these many years later, I see that my own voice was not completely suppressed. In numerous passages I was intuitively using a woman's language, seeing sexual experience from a woman's point of view. I finally decided to release the erotica for publication because it shows the beginning efforts of a woman in a world that had been the domain of men."

Susie Bright saw the results as forming part of a pioneering feminist erotica.

In 2021 Sky Atlantic released a six-part erotic drama based on Little Birds.

== See also ==
- D. H. Lawrence
- Émile Zola
- George Sand
- The Diary of Anaïs Nin
