= Henry & June =

1990 film by Philip Kaufman

- Theatrical release poster
- Directed by: Philip Kaufman
- Written by: Philip Kaufman; Rose Kaufman
- Produced by: Peter Kaufman
- Starring: Fred Ward; Uma Thurman; Maria de Medeiros; Richard E. Grant; Kevin Spacey
- Cinematography: Philippe Rousselot
- Edited by: Dede Allen; Vivien Hillgrove Gilliam; William S. Scharf
- Music by: Mark Adler
- Production companies: Walrus & Associates
- Distributed by: Universal Pictures
- Release dates: September 14, 1990 (Venice); October 5, 1990 (United States)
- Running time: 136 minutes
- Country: United States
- Language: English
- Box office: $11.5 million

Henry & June is a 1990 American biographical drama film directed by Philip Kaufman, and starring Fred Ward, Uma Thurman, and Maria de Medeiros. It is loosely based on the posthumously published 1986 Anaïs Nin book of the same name, and tells the story of Nin's relationship with Henry Miller and his wife, June.

The film was nominated for Best Cinematography at the 63rd Academy Awards.

It was the first film to be given an NC-17 rating by the MPAA.

== Plot ==
In 1931 in Paris, France, Anaïs Nin is in a stable relationship with her husband Ian Hugo, but longs for more out of life. When Nin first meets Henry Miller, he is working on his first novel. Nin is drawn to Miller and his wife June, as well as their bohemian lifestyle. Nin becomes involved in the couple's tormented relationship, having an affair with Miller and also pursuing June. Ultimately, Nin helps Miller to publish his novel Tropic of Cancer, but catalyzes the Millers' separation, while she returns to Hugo.

== Cast ==
- Fred Ward as Henry Miller
- Uma Thurman as June Miller
- Maria de Medeiros as Anaïs Nin
- Richard E. Grant as Ian Hugo (Hugo in credits)
- Kevin Spacey as Richard Osborn (Osborn in credits)
- Jean-Philippe Écoffey as Eduardo Sanchez (Eduardo in credits; Écoffey spelled as "Ecoffey")
- Gary Oldman as Pop (credited as "Maurice Escargot")
- Artus de Penguern as Brassaï
- Liz Hasse as Jean
- Brigitte Lahaie as Henry's prostitute
- Féodor Atkine as Francisco Miralles Arnau

== Soundtrack ==
The soundtrack was arranged by Mark Adler, consisting of period popular songs.

1. Jean Lenoir, "Parlez-moi d'amour" (Lucienne Boyer)
2. Claude Debussy, Six épigraphes antiques: Pour l'égyptienne (Ensemble Musical de Paris)
3. Francis Poulenc, "Les chemins de l'amour" (Ransom Wilson and Christopher O'Riley)
4. Debussy, Petite Suite: "Ballet" (Aloys and Alfons Kontarsky)
5. Harry Warren, "I Found a Million Dollar Baby" (Bing Crosby)
6. Erik Satie, "Gnossienne No. 3" (Pascal Rogé)
7. Satie, "Je te veux" (Jean-Pierre Armengaud)
8. Debussy, "Sonata for Violin and Piano" (first movement) (Kyung-wha Chung and Radu Lupu)
9. Frédéric Chopin, Nocturne No. 1 in C Major [sic] (Paul Crossley)
10. Georges Auric, "Sous les toits de Paris" (Rene Nazels)
11. Jacques Larmanjat, lyrics by Francis Carco, "Le doux caboulot" (Annie Fratellini)
12. Debussy, "La plus que lente" (Josef Suk)
13. "Je m'ennuie" (Mark Adler)
14. "Coralia" (Mark Adler)
15. Irving Mills, "St. James Infirmary Blues" (Mark Adler)
16. Francisco Tárrega, "Gran Vals" (Francisco Tárrega)
17. Joaquin Nin-Culmell, "Basque Song" (Joaquin Nin-Culmell)
18. Vincent Scotto, lyrics by George Koger and H. Vama, "J'ai deux amours" (Josephine Baker)

== Reception ==
=== Box office ===
Henry & June grossed $11,567,449 in the domestic market.

=== Critical reception ===
The film received mixed reviews from critics. Owen Gleiberman of Entertainment Weekly gave the film a B−, but felt that, "Kaufman, trying to deepen the erotic explorations of Unbearable Lightness, ends up with a triangle movie that's watchable but also arty and rather stilted. The biggest disappointment of the film is that, after all the ratings brouhaha, it’s not very sexy." Janet Maslin of the New York Times noted the film's efforts to present sex in a more artistic, highbrow manner, remarking, "The film's sex scenes, photographed delicately by Philippe Rousselot and directed with great intensity by Mr. Kaufman, are particularly lofty. These sequences, often tinged with symbolism (a hand playing a guitar juxtaposed with a hand on a woman's breast), tend to be self-consciously bold," but felt the film lacked daring.

The film has a 60% approval rating on review aggregate Rotten Tomatoes based on 25 reviews, with an average rating of 6.1/10. The site's consensus reads, "Henry & June celebrates sensuality and passion, though the portentous filmmaking drags it down by a large degree." Metacritic, which uses a weighted average, assigned the film a score of 62 out of 100, based on 24 critics, indicating "generally favorable" reviews.

== Rating ==
Henry & June was the first film to receive the MPAA's rating of NC-17, which was devised as a replacement for the X rating. NC-17 was intended to signify serious, non-pornographic films with more violence or (especially) sexual content than would qualify for an R rating. The inclusion of the postcard Nin views at the start of the film (which is of Hokusai's The Dream of the Fisherman's Wife), and some scenes of le Bal des Beaux Arts contributed to the NC-17 rating.

The film was given a more lenient M rating in Australia and an uncut 18 in the United Kingdom. Conversely, it was banned in South Africa. The ban has since been lifted. The film was given an R18 rating in New Zealand and was later lowered to M rating in late 2023.
