= Nearer the Moon =

Nearer the Moon: From a Journal of Love, the Unexpurgated Diary of Anaïs Nin
- Front cover
- Author: Anaïs Nin
- Language: English
- Genre: Memoir, Diary
- Publisher: Harcourt Brace & Company
- Publication date: 1996
- Media type: Print (Hardcover and Paperback)
- ISBN: 0-15-100089-1
- Dewey Decimal: 818.5203 DC 20
- LC Class: PS3527.I865 Z47 1996
- Preceded by: Fire: From A Journal of Love

Nearer the Moon: From a Journal of Love (full title Nearer the Moon: From a Journal of Love, the Unexpurgated Diary of Anaïs Nin (1937–1939)) is a 1996 book based upon material excerpted from the unpublished diaries of Anaïs Nin. It corresponds temporally to part of Nin's published diaries. It consists mainly of material that was left out of the published version because it would have hurt people involved or their relationships with Anaïs Nin had it been published at the time.

The book displays the range of Nin's moods and emotions. She avoided re-writing or writing long afterward, when possible, in order to preserve the truth about how she felt at the time of each entry. As the diaries go on, they become more poetical or stream of consciousness, as opposed to objective. She is sometimes very explicit about her sexual activity and how she feels about it. The sources of some of her erotic stories can be recognized here. Generally the bazaar Latin American settings for some of her stories were first written down here, as told her by Gonzalo Moré and his wife Helba. The contrasts between her various emotional and sexual relationships as well as the fluctuations in each are very striking and clear.

== Plot summary ==
Anaïs Nin continues her open marriage with Hugh Parker Guiler and her affairs with Henry Miller and Gonzalo Moré, under the shadow of the Spanish Revolution and the approach of World War II. She helps Gonzalo with his Communist and anti-Fascist activities, even though she believes more in literature and personal contact than in politics as a means of progress. Henry's work is already succeeding, and Anaïs's is starting to be published (of course, this will be interrupted by the war).

== Sequel ==
The Swallow Press/Ohio University Press continued the publication of Anaïs Nin's unexpurgated diaries. In 2013, they published Mirages, which includes Nin's diaries from 1939 to 1947 and in 2017, they published Trapeze, which tells about years 1947 to 1955.
