= Groupe d'études philosophiques et scientifiques pour l'examen des idées nouvelles =

French philosophical study group

The Groupe d'études philosophiques et scientifiques pour l'examen des idées nouvelles ("Philosophical and scientific society for the assessment of emerging ideas") was a French philosophical study group who met at the Sorbonne, Paris in the 1920s and early 1930s. It was established by René and Yvonne Allendy.

== History ==
The group was inaugurated on 7 December 1922 with a presentation by Paul Langevin. In 1925 René Allendy described the aims of the group in terms of bringing together artists, scientists and other intellectuals from the universities. The group continued until 1934.

Anaïs Nin described one of their events:

"In an amphitheatre at the Sorbonne. The chaste and serious atmosphere of the class room. Madame Allendy was there: white hair, blue eyes, maternal, solid. (...)"

== Selected speakers ==
- Alfred Adler
- Antonin Artaud
- Le Corbusier
- Sonia Delaunay
- Carl Einstein
- Waldemar George
- Juan Gris
- Marinetti
- Jacques Maritain
- Maurice Raynal
- Henri Sauguet
- Jean Tedesco
- Mary Wigman
