= Seduction of the Minotaur =

1958 novel by Anaïs Nin

First edition

Seduction of the Minotaur is an autobiographical novel by Anaïs Nin, the last part of her Cities of the Interior sequence. It is about a woman named Lillian, and her self-psychoanalysis. The setting is taken from Anaïs' diary account of her first trip to Acapulco in 1947, and the novel repeats much of the first part of The Diary of Anaïs Nin volume V. Since the author was concerned with psychology rather than physical adventure, there is actually less violence in the novel than in the diary account. The exception is that the doctor allows himself to be shot because he is loved only as a doctor and never as a man, perhaps patterned after her understanding of Otto Rank's death.

The title refers to the Freudian concept of a "monster" in the unconscious confined by a "labyrinth". Since one should not kill one's own mind, the repressed feelings must be "seduced" by developing conscious insight. An earlier version was published in 1958 with the title Solar Barque, after a ship found in an Egyptian pyramid.
