= Auletris =

2016 posthumous collection by Anaïs Nin

- Front cover
- Author: Anaïs Nin
- Language: English
- Genre: Short stories; erotic literature
- Publisher: Sky Blue Press
- Publication date: 2016
- Media type: Print
- Pages: 118 pages
- ISBN: 978-0-9889170-9-5

Auletris is a collection of erotic short stories by Anaïs Nin, published posthumously by Sky Blue Press in 2016. It features the short pieces "Life in Provincetown" and "Marcel," the latter of which appeared in a severely edited form in Delta of Venus (1977).
