= The Diary of Anaïs Nin =

Book by Anaïs Nin

- First editions
- Author: Anaïs Nin
- Language: English
- Genre: Diary
- Publication date: 1966

The Diary of Anaïs Nin is the published version of Anaïs Nin's own private manuscript diary, which she began at age 11 in 1914 during a trip from Europe to New York with her mother and two brothers. Nin would later say she had begun the diary as a letter to her father, Cuban composer Joaquín Nin, who had abandoned the family a few years earlier.

Over the years, the diary would become Nin's best friend and confidante. Despite the attempts of her mother, therapists Rene Allendy and Otto Rank, and writer Henry Miller, to break Nin of her dependence on the diary, she would continue to keep a diary up until her death in 1977.

As early as the 1930s Nin had sought to have the diary published. Due to its size (in 1966, the diary contained more than 15,000 typewritten pages in some 150 volumes) and literary style, she would not find a publisher until 1966, when the first volume of her diary would be published, covering the years 1931–1934 in her life. The published version of her diary would be very popular among young women, making Nin a feminist icon in the 1960s. Six more volumes of her diary would follow.

== Expurgated diaries ==
The series of published diaries that made their appearance starting in 1966 are now sometimes referred to as the "expurgated" editions. This is because in 1986, Rupert Pole, Nin's widower and literary executor, began to publish what are now termed the "unexpurgated" versions of the diary. The "unexpurgated" versions of the diaries are more sexually frank than the versions published in the 1960s and 1970s.

=== Volume I (1931–1934) ===
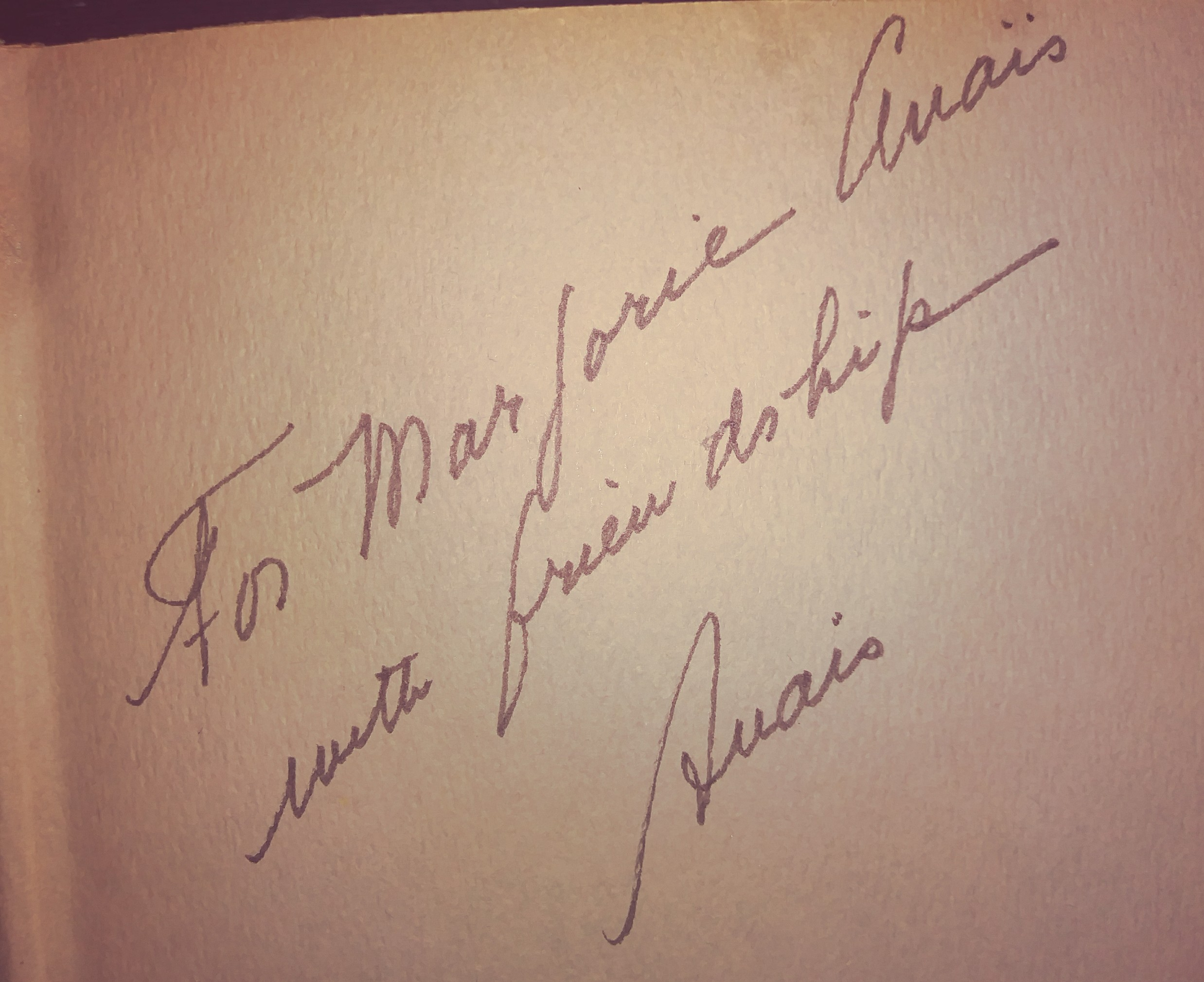
Inscription from Nin to Marjorie Anaïs Housepian Dobkin in a first edition of the original volume

First published in 1966, it depicts Nin living in Louveciennes, just outside Paris, with her husband, banker Hugh Parker Guiler. Guiler's name is not once mentioned in this volume. Volume One covers the most important years of her relationship with Henry Miller. Many of the early entries deal with Henry and his fascinating wife June. She discusses her psychoanalytic sessions with Rene Allendy and Otto Rank at length. During this period, her father re-enters her life. By the end of this volume, Henry has published Tropic of Cancer and she had completed House of Incest (published, 1936) and Winter of Artifice (published 1939). During his time, Henry Miller started to influence the writings published in Louveciennes in 1966. Nin's impression of Miller was rather startling, as she fell in contemplation of his literacy.

=== Volume V (1947–1955) ===
Volume V was published in 1974, describes her first trip to Acapulco, the beginning of her double life in Sierra Madre, California as well as in New York, the death of her mother and the progress of her feelings and career. Her love life, including the existence of both her husbands, is still deleted.

=== Volume VI (1955–1966) ===
Volume VI was published in 1976, and was edited by Gunther Stuhlmann. It was dedicated to the team of doctors who saved her life in January 1975. It opens with her description of the aftereffects of having taken LSD, and closes with her mentioning the publication of Volume I of her diaries and her belated recognition as a writer. Other subjects include a debate with Aldous Huxley over psychedelics, a visit to the Brussels World's Fair of 1958, and working as an editor for the magazine Eve. She was a witness to the Caresse Crosby incident at Delphi, when the Greek government arrested Crosby for trying to build a geopolitical community counter to established Greek sovereignty.

== Unexpurgated diaries ==
In 1986, Rupert Pole, Nin's surviving widower and literary executor, began to publish what are now termed the "unexpurgated" versions of the diary. The "unexpurgated" versions of the diaries are more sexually frank than the versions published in the 1960s and 1970s. The unexpurgated editions were published by Harcourt Brace Jovanovich and by Swallow Press, an imprint of Ohio University Press that was the original US publisher of Nin's work.

=== Henry and June: From "A Journal of Love" – The Unexpurgated Diary of Anais Nin (1931–1932) ===
Henry and June spans a single year in Nin's life when she discovers love and torment in one insatiable couple. From late 1931 to the end of 1932, Nin falls in love with Henry Miller's writing and his wife June's striking beauty. When June leaves Paris for New York, Henry and Nin begin a fiery affair that liberates her sexually and morally, but also undermines her marriage and eventually leads her into psychoanalysis. As she grapples with her own conscience, a single question dominates her thoughts: What will happen when June returns to Paris? An intimate account of one woman's sexual awakening, Henry and June exposes the pain and pleasure felt by a single person trapped between two loves.

=== Incest: From "A Journal of Love" – The Unexpurgated Diary of Anaïs Nin (1932–1934) ===
Published in 1993, This is the continuation of the story begun in Henry and June, exposing the shattering psychological drama that drove Nin to seek absolution from her psychoanalysts for the ultimate transgression. This portion of Nin's diary, which was cut from the expurgated editions published in her lifetime, records her steamy love affair with Henry Miller in Paris, but here her intense adoration gives way to disillusionment. She describes Miller as crude, egotistic, imitative, childishly irresponsible, "a madman." Her real focus, however, is her father, Joaquin Nin, a Spanish pianist and aristocratic Don Juan who seduced her after a 20-year absence. Her graphic account of their lovemaking and of her incestuous romantic feelings is fairly shocking. Nin sought absolution from her psychiatrist and lover, Otto Rank, who advised her to bed her father, then dump him as punishment for abandoning her when she was 10. Nin's ornate, hothouse prose is much rawer than the chiseled style of the expurgated diaries. She seethes with jealousy at Miller's wife June, swoons over poet and actor Antonin Artaud, neglects her protective husband, Hugh Guiler, and describes her traumatic delivery of a stillborn child. Her extraordinary, tangled self-analysis is a disarming record of her emotional and creative growth.

=== Fire: From "A Journal of Love" The Unexpurgated Diary of Anaïs Nin, 1934–1937 ===
Published in 1996, the third volume of Anaïs Nin's unexpurgated diaries covers a period during which she lived in New York and documented her relationships with her husband, Hugh Parker Guiler, writer Henry Miller, psychoanalyst Otto Rank, and Gonzalo More. The volume includes accounts of her personal relationships, emotional experiences, and reflections on sexuality, identity, and psychology. Compared with the earlier edited editions of her diaries, the unexpurgated version restores material that had previously been omitted, providing a more complete account of the period.

=== Nearer the Moon: From a Journal of Love : The Unexpurgated Diary of Anais Nin, 1937–1939 ===
Published in 1996, one would hardly know that in this part of her diaries Nin was living in a France on the brink of war. "I dream, I kiss, I have orgasms, I get exalted, I leave the world, I float, I cook, I sew, I have nightmares, I follow a gigantic creative plan," she claims. Her self-description says it all. Here Nin often pauses to improve upon life, which in the two years, spent mostly in Paris, covered in this volume, consisted largely of cadging from her complaisant banker husband, Hugh Guiler, to support her lovers. One was the gaunt, bald sexual athlete and expatriate novelist, Henry Miller, who by then had parted from his wife, June. Another was the swarthy Communist activist Gonzalo More, whose appetite for sex overwhelmed his passion for politics, and whose wife, Helba Huara encouraged his income-producing infidelity. Nin betrayed all three men, even on days (and nights) when she bedded them all. In her middle 30s, her erotomania left her little time for much else, but she managed to write pornographic (and then censorable) short fiction and reams of what later skeptics called a "liary." She was "a true Catholic," More told her. "You love the sin and absolution and regrets and sinning again." Yet she had few regrets but the unpublishability of her diaries. At the outbreak of World War II she leaves for America. She will never live in Paris again.

=== Mirages: The Unexpurgated Diary of Anais Nin, 1939–1947 ===
Mirages, published in 2013 by Swallow Press, opens at the dawn of World War II, when Nin fled Paris, where she had lived for fifteen years with her husband, banker Hugh Guiler, and ends in 1947 when she meets Rupert Pole, the man who would be “the One,” the lover who would satisfy her insatiable hunger for connection. In the middle looms a period Nin describes as “hell,” during which she experiences a kind of erotic madness, a delirium that fuels her search for love. At times desperate and suicidal, Nin finds life more fulfilling when it conforms to her dreams—a series of mirages she conjures to avoid reality, the horrors of war, and an America she finds abysmally immature. Often in a state of semi-delirium where she finds herself drowning in her unconscious, she writes that she needs love so abnormally that it all seems natural to keep several relationships going at once, all the one and the same love. Her lovers included Henry Miller, 17-year-old Bill Pinckard, Edmund Wilson, and dozens of others, including an emotionally charged, but physically unfulfilled, relationship with Gore Vidal. As a child suffering abandonment by her father, Nin wrote, “Close your eyes to the ugly things,” and, against a horrifying backdrop of war and death, Nin combats the world’s darkness with her own search for light. Mirages collects, for the first time, the story that was cut from all of Nin’s other published diaries, particularly volumes 3 and 4 of The Diary of Anaïs Nin, which cover the same time period. Mirages answers the questions Nin readers have been asking for decades: What led to the demise of Nin’s love affair with Henry Miller? Just how troubled was her marriage to Hugh Guiler? What is the story behind Nin’s “children,” the effeminate young men she seemed to collect at will? Mirages is a deeply personal story of heartbreak, despair, desperation, carnage, and deep mourning, but it is also one of courage, persistence, evolution, and redemption that reaches beyond the personal to the universal.

=== Trapeze: The Unexpurgated Diary of Anaïs Nin, 1947–1955 ===
Trapeze, (2017, Swallow Press), marks the start of what Nin came to call her “trapeze life,” swinging between her long-time husband, Hugh Guiler, in New York and her lover, Rupert Pole, in California, a lifestyle she continued until her death in 1977.

=== The Diary of Others: The Unexpurgated Diary of Anaïs Nin, 1955–1966 ===
The penultimate volume of a series of Anaïs Nin’s unexpurgated diaries. When The Diary of Others opens, Nin, at age fifty-two, has recently entered into a bigamous marriage with the handsome forest ranger Rupert Pole in California, while her legal husband of thirty years, the faithful banker Hugh (Hugo) Guiler is unaware in New York. The first part of the diary, which is called “The Trapeze Life,” details Nin’s complicated efforts to keep each husband unaware of the other as she jetted between them, a process she likened to a bicoastal “trapeze.” At the same time, few publishers were interested in her feminine and introspective fiction, and she considered herself a failed writer. However, she was keeping a diary she had begun at age eleven, and she began to realize that the diary itself was her most important work—but she wondered how she could publish it when it included numerous lovers, incest, and abortion without harming those she loved, which is the subject of the second portion of this volume, called “Others.” The Diary of Others ends with the publication of the first volume of The Diary of Anaïs Nin, which propelled Nin to critical and cultural fame at the age of sixty-three.

The final diary is published under the title of A Joyous Transformation: The Unexpurgated Diary of Anaïs Nin, 1966–1977.
