= Fire: From a Journal of Love =

1995 book

Fire: From : a Journal of Love – the Unexpurgated Diary of Anaïs Nin
- First edition
- Author: Anaïs Nin
- Language: English
- Genre: Memoir, diary
- Publisher: Harcourt Brace Jovanovich
- Publication date: 1995
- Media type: Print (hardback & paperback)
- Pages: 434
- ISBN: 0151000883
- OCLC: 13333571
- Dewey Decimal: 818'.5203–dc20
- LC Class: PS3527.I865 Z466 1995
- Preceded by: Incest: From a Journal of Love
- Followed by: Nearer the Moon: From A Journal of Love : The Unexpurgated Diary of Anaïs Nin, 1937–1939 (Vol 4)

Fire: From the Unexpurgated Diary of Anaïs Nin (full title Fire: From A Journal of Love: the Unexpurgated Diary of Anaïs Nin (1934–1937) is a 1995 book that is based on material excerpted from the unpublished diaries of Anaïs Nin. It corresponds temporally to part of Anaïs Nin's published diaries, but consists mostly of material about her love life that was too sensitive or secret to publish in her lifetime or in that of others involved.

This book is especially notable for her account and her understanding of female sexuality, as well as human nature in general.

== Plot summary ==
She continues her marriage with Hugh Parker Guiler and her literary and sexual relationship with Henry Miller. Both these men follow her to New York and win her back from Otto Rank. She returns to Paris and eventually gives up practicing psychoanalysis. She feels over dependent on Henry and continues to take love where she finds it. She begins a very passionate affair with the wildly romantic but irresponsible Peruvian, Gonzalo Moré.

== Reception ==
The book received mixed reviews; a review by Melissa Knox in the New Leader argued that "Still, her failures of insight, her lies, are integral to Fire's portrait of the confusions of female sexuality. Her dissimulations are clues to the abiding mysteries of women's emotional and erotic lives."
