= Anaïs Nin: A Biography =

Biography of Anaïs Nin by Deirdre Bair

- Author: Deirdre Bair
- Subject: Anaïs Nin
- Publication date: 1995
- ISBN: 9780399139888

Anaïs Nin: A Biography is Deirdre Bair's award-winning biography of writer Anaïs Nin. It is considered arguably by many to be the most comprehensive, well-researched, and scholarly biography available of Nin. Though the biography has received praise, it has also angered some fans of Anaïs Nin as well as some of her former associates, some of whom claim that Bair's critical and rigorous investigation of Anaïs Nin's life is unsympathetic.

Biographer Deirdre Bair has also gained notice for her biographies of Simone de Beauvoir, Samuel Beckett and Carl Jung.
