= The Early Diary of Anaïs Nin =

Diaries published between 1978 and 1985

Volume 1 (publ. Harcourt Brace Jovanovich)

The Early Diary of Anaïs Nin, in four volumes, is the portion of Anaïs Nin's lifelong personal journals and notebooks from the period before it had to be split because it became so personal that only portions could be published while any of the people involved were still living. The first volume appeared in 1978 and the fourth in 1985.

== Linotte (Volume 1) ==
Linotte, the early diary of Anaïs Nin; with a preface by Joaquin Nin-Culmell, (1914–1920), Translated from the French by Jean L. Sherman, ISBN 0151524882.

== Volume 2 ==
1920–1923: with a preface by Joaquin Nin-Culmell; New York; San Diego: Harcourt Brace & Co., 1983, ISBN 0156272482.

== Volume 3 ==
Journal of a Wife: the early diary of Anaïs Nin 1923–1927, edited by Rupert Pole, with a preface by Joaquin Nin-Culmell, 1983, Harcourt Brace Jovanovich, ISBN 0151271844 (v. 3) (also: London: Peter Owen, 1984 ISBN 0720606306)

In this period, she returns from New York to Paris, and she has difficulty adjusting, accepting and making the sort of artistic friends she is used to. Her discomfort with sexuality "sensuality" begins to be eroded, at least intellectually. She is uncomfortable with the more open sexuality of France.

== Volume 4 ==
1927–1931: London: Peter Owen, 1994, ISBN 0720609453.
