= In Favor of the Sensitive Man =

1976 collection of essays by Anaïs Nin

In Favor of the Sensitive Man: And Other Essays
- First-edition cover
- Author: Anaïs Nin
- Language: English
- Genre: Essays
- Publisher: Harcourt Brace Jovanovic
- Publication date: 1976
- Media type: Print
- Pages: 169
- ISBN: 978-0-156-44445-3

In Favor of the Sensitive Man: And Other Essays is a collection of essays published by Anaïs Nin in 1976.

== Content ==
Women and men

- Eroticism in Women
- The New Women
- Anais Nin Talks About Being a Woman:

(i) An Interview (ii) Notes on Feminism (iii) My Sister, My Spouse (iv) Between Me And Life (v) Women and Children in Japan (vi) In Favor of the Sensitive Man

Writing, Music and Films

- On Truth and Reality
- The Story of my Printing Press
- Novelist on Stage
- Out of the Labyrinth: An Interview
- The Suicide Academy
- Miss Macintosh, My Darling
- Angel in the Forest
- Edgar Varése
- At a Journal Workshop
- Henry Jaglom: Magician of the Film
- Un Chant de' Armour
- Ingmar Bergman

Enchanted Places

- The Labyrinthine City of Fez
- Morocco
- The Spirit of Bali
- Port Vila, New Hebrides
- The Swallow Never Leave Nouméa
- My Turkish Grandmother
