= Francisco Miralles Arnau =

Francisco Miralles
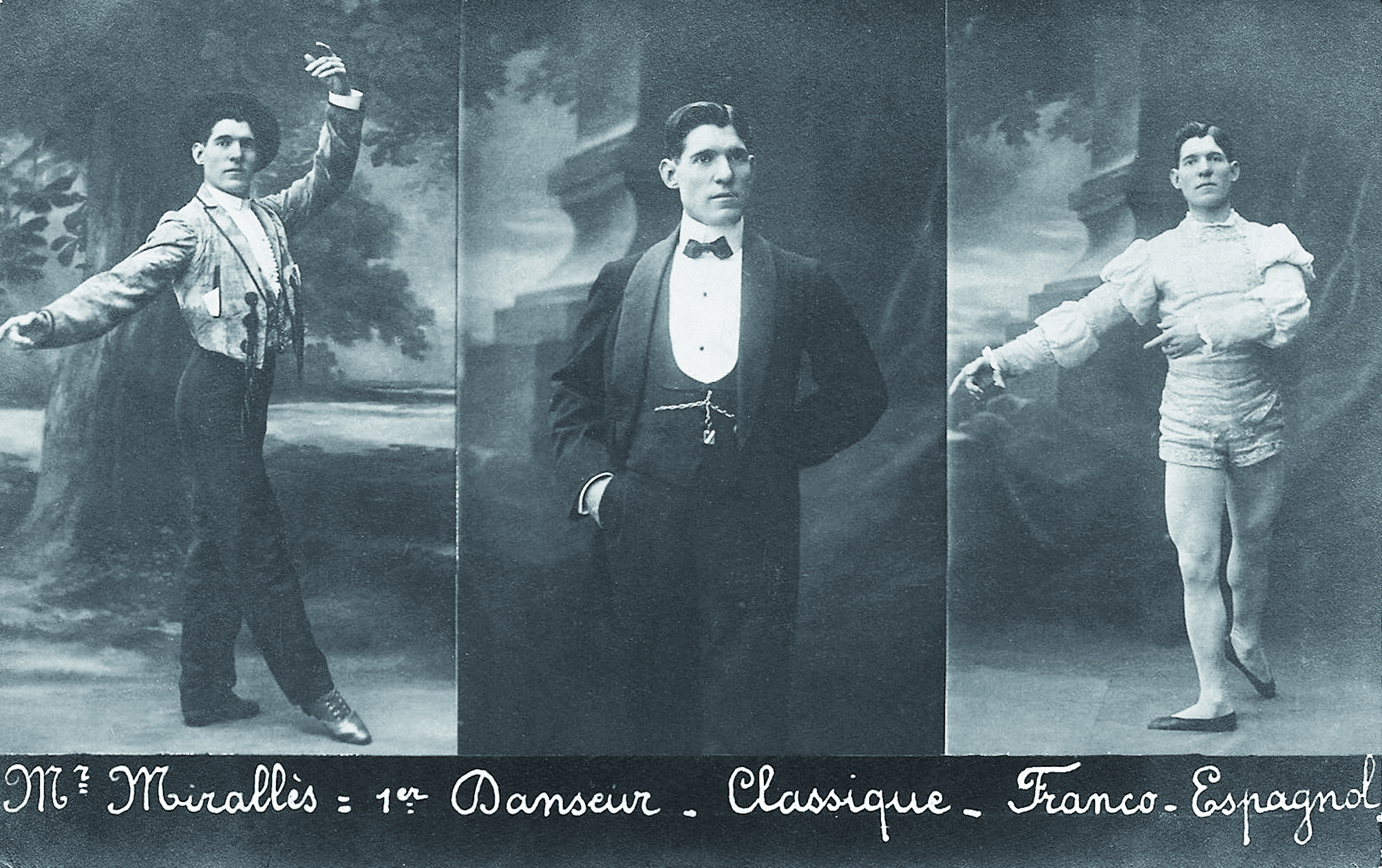
- Born: Francisco Miralles Arnau; August 2, 1871; Valencia, Comunidad Valenciana, Spain
- Died: May 9, 1932 (aged 60); Paris, France
- Other names: The dancer of the Russian Tsars
- Occupations: Dancer, choreographer y dance teacher
- Years active: End of 19th century and beginning of 20th century
- Spouse: Cándida Espinosa Conde

Notes
- Bibliography by Rodríguez Lloréns, R. (2015). Francisco Miralles. Pasos de baile para una leyenda. L'Eixam Edicions.

Francisco Miralles Arnau (Valencia, August 2, 1871 - Paris, May 9, 1932) was a dancer, choreographer and Spanish and classical dance teacher. His solid training allowed him to develop a successful international career in which he emphasized playing the Bolero.On July 29, 2022, the Consell de la Generalitat Valenciana approved the declaration of the day of his birth, August 2, as the Day of Traditional Valencian Dance in honor of the artist with an international career.

== Biography ==
=== Early years ===
Francisco Miralles was born on August 2, 1871, in a humble family. From a very young age, he showed interest in Spanish dance. He initially took lessons from Spanish dance maestro Ramón Porta Ricart in the field of traditional Valencian dance. Later on, he continued studying with maestro José Martí and, finally, with Vicente Moreno. Vicente Moreno was the opera ballet teacher at Teatro Principal, one of the main theaters in Valencia.

=== Career ===
After his debut in the Valencian theaters, Francisco Miralles traveled to Andalusia and settled in Málaga. In this city he danced in the Café de España with the dancer Cándida Espinosa Conde, and they got married in 1897. He traveled then to Barcelona, where he was discovered by French managers when he worked at the Granvía Theater. He left Spain in 1898 to work in Paris, and, after his international career began, he would only come back to his hometown for short visits or during the Great War.

He developed his artistic career mainly in Russia, where he was known as The dancer of the Russian Tsars, but also in France, America and Africa. He was the dance teacher of several artist from the Paris Opera, with whom he also performed many times. Also, famous writer Anaïs Nin learnt Spanish dance in Paris with Francisco Miralles from 1927 to 1930, as she recorded herself in her diaries.

He taught many Spanish dancers, to whom he transmitted more than two hundred and fifty choreographies, whose titles he collected in his teaching notebook, many with references to Valencian dances. Among all of them, his most notable student was Mariemma, who always remember her professor with admiration and appreciation.

== Discography ==
Francisco Miralles was also concertmaster of castanets and recorded several albums with the Aerophone label, where he performed his own compositions.
