= Mirages: The Unexpurgated Diary of Anaïs Nin, 1939–1947 =

- Front cover
- Author: Anaïs Nin
- Language: English
- Genre: Diary
- Publisher: Swallow Press
- Publication date: 2013
- Media type: Print
- Pages: 440
- ISBN: 978-0804011655

Mirages: The Unexpurgated Diary of Anaïs Nin, 1939–1947 is a volume of diary entries by Anaïs Nin from her life between 1939 and 1947, first published in 2013 by Swallow Press. It was edited by Paul Herron, and features an introduction by Kim Krizan.
