= D. H. Lawrence: An Unprofessional Study =

Anaïs Nin's first book

- First edition
- Author: Anaïs Nin
- Publisher: Edward W. Titus
- Publication date: 1932
- Publication place: France

D. H. Lawrence: An Unprofessional Study was Anaïs Nin's first book in print, published by Edward W. Titus in Paris, 1932. The original edition saw 550 copies, and was relatively well received in the literary community. It is a study of the works of her literary hero D. H. Lawrence. The book is notable because it was published at a time when many critics were turning their backs on Lawrence. At the time, it was virtually unheard of for a woman to praise Lawrence, a man whose works had been very controversial, and in several cases, banned for their sexual content.
