= Cities of the Interior =

Book by Anaïs Nin

First edition (publ. Alan Swallow Press) Illustrated by Ian Hugo

Cities of the Interior is a novel sequence published in one volume containing the five books of Anaïs Nin's "continuous novel": Ladders to Fire, Children of the Albatross, The Four-Chambered Heart, A Spy in the House of Love and Seduction of the Minotaur. This combined volume was first published, by the author, in 1959. Its central figures are three women resembling different aspects of the author, and in some superficial ways June Miller. In some of the books they interact with each other, with a painter resembling Henry Miller and with South Americans resembling her friend, the Peruvian radical Gonzalo Moré, and his wife Helba. Most of the content is taken from her diaries, polished and thinly disguised.

It was followed by her last novel, Collages.

Gore Vidal was impressed by both Ladders to Fire and Children of the Albatross, and played a role in their publication.
