= René Allendy =

René Félix Allendy (French: [alɑ̃di]; 19 February 1889, Paris – 12 July 1942, Montpellier) was a French psychoanalyst and homeopath.

== Life ==
Allendy contracted pneumonia at three years and was a sickly child, affected by diphtheria and other serious ailments. After successfully completing secondary school, he studied Russian and Swedish and obtained a medical degree from the School of Medicine in Paris in 1912. A few days later, he married Yvonne Nel-Dumouchel, who was his companion and assistant until her death in 1935. After the death of Yvonne, Allendy married her sister, Colette.

In 1914 he was mobilized for World War I, but after being diagnosed with tuberculosis, he returned to civilian life. He practiced medicine in the hospitals of Léopold-Bellan and Saint-Jacques. At the latter, between 1932 and 1939, he trialed a homeopathic treatment to prevent tuberculosis.

In 1922 he and his wife, Yvonne, established the Groupe d'études philosophiques et scientifiques pour l'examen des idées nouvelles at Sorbonne, dedicated to the promotion of humanistic and scientific novelties. It attracted a range of prominent artists to give talks. In 1924, he underwent psychoanalysis with René Laforgue and was trained to practice as an analyst himself. In 1926, Princess Marie Bonaparte, a protegée of Freud, helped found the Psychoanalytic Society of Paris, where Allendy worked as a secretary between 1928 and 1931.

In 1932, the writer Anaïs Nin was a patient and, later, a lover of Allendy. The story of the relationship is described in detail in Nin's diary, specifically in Henry and June. Allendy also analyzed Antonin Artaud.

== Works ==
- L'alchimie et la médecine : étude sur les théories hermétiques dans l'histoire de la médecine (1912)
- La psychanalyse et les névroses (1924), with René Laforgue
- Les rêves et leur interprétation psychanalytique (1926)
- Le problème de la Destinée (1927)
- Orientations des idées médicales (1928)
- La justice intérieure (1931)
- La psychanalyse : doctrines et applications (1931)
- Capitalisme et sexualité (1932), with Yvonne Allendy
- Essai sur la guérison (1934)
- Paracelse, le médecin maudit (1937)
- Rêves expliqués (1938)
- Aristote ou le complexe de trahison (1942)
- Journal d'un médecin malade (1944)
- Les constitutions psychiques (2002), Éditions L'Harmattan, ISBN 2-7475-2265-2
