= Waste of Timelessness =

First edition

Waste of Timelessness and Other Early Stories by Anaïs Nin, 1977, Magic Circle Press is a collection of short stories by Anaïs Nin, written before her more known publications. Her preface states that the book "[is] an example of the early work of a person who was (much) later a successful writer."

It contains the title story 'Waste of Timelessness' and fifteen others: 'The Song in the Garden', 'The Fear of Nice', 'The Gypsy Feeling', 'The Russian Who Did Not Believe in Miracles & Why', 'The Dance Which Could Not Be Danced', 'A Dangerous Perfume', 'Red Roses', 'Our Minds Are Engaged', 'Alchemy', 'Tishnar', 'The Idealist', 'The Peacock Feathers', 'Faithfulness', 'A Spoiled Party' and 'A Slippery Floor'.
