= The Four-Chambered Heart =

1950 novel by Anaïs Nin

- First US edition
- Author: Anaïs Nin
- Language: English
- Publisher: Duell, Sloan and Pearce
- Publication date: 1950
- Publication place: France

The Four-Chambered Heart is a 1950 autobiographical novel by French-born writer Anaïs Nin, part of her Cities of the Interior sequence. It is about a woman named Djuna, her love, her thoughts, her emotions, her doubts, her decisions, and her sacrifices. It is not considered one of Nin's most noteworthy novels, yet it continues to be referenced in various studies and discussions regarding Nin and her body of work.

== The story behind the story ==
The story is based on Nin's own experiences and destructive love relationship with Gonzalo Moré, Peruvian poet and bohemian. They met in 1936 and their relationship lasted for a decade. It is Nin's diaries during this time that have translated into this novel about her alter ego Djuna.

In the novel, the character Djuna falls in love with Rango and becomes entangled in his chaotic life. She is introduced to Zora, Rango's wife, a former dancer who has fallen into a morass of hypochondria and self-centered manipulation. These characters, of course, are modeled after Nin, Moré, and his wife Helba Huara.

When Nin met Moré in 1936 his wife was an invalid, after having been a widely renowned exotic dancer, both in Europe and on Broadway, and the couple were impoverished and living in a basement. Nin rented a house boat on the Seine, which was used for Nin's and Moré's amorous meetings. The house boat also appears in The Four-Chambered Heart.

Nin's relationship with Moré was full of passion, lust and sexual fury, which is reflected in the story of The Four-Chambered Heart. Nin's love for Moré made her try to rehabilitate him and get him to make something of his, in her eyes, huge talent. She failed in this attempt, being sucked into his and his wife's destructive lives. After three years of passionate struggle she fled Paris when World War II started, and returned to New York. She brought Moré with her and employed him in a printing press enterprise she started on her own, ultimately trying to rip apart the destructive cord to his wife and make him learn a craft of his own. Her efforts proved fruitless in the end, and Moré did poorly, leaving her to have to do most of the job herself. The relationship finally ended in 1948. Nin says in her 1948 diary: “The Gonzalo I loved is dead. The one I knew at the end, without illusion, I did not love. People create an illusion together and then it is disintegrated by reality.“

The remains of this destructive relationship is this novel, The Four-Chambered Heart, in which she tries to describe the anguish and the passion she felt in her decade-long relation with Moré.
