= Trapeze: The Unexpurgated Diary of Anaïs Nin, 1947–1955 =

- Front cover
- Author: Anaïs Nin
- Language: English
- Genre: Diary
- Publisher: Swallow Press
- Publication date: 2017
- Media type: Print
- Pages: 376
- ISBN: 978-0-8040-1181-5

Trapeze: The Unexpurgated Diary of Anaïs Nin, 1947–1955 is a volume of diary entries by Anaïs Nin from her life between 1947 and 1955, first published in 2017 by Swallow Press. It was edited by Paul Herron, and features an introduction by Benjamin Franklin V.
