= The Novel of the Future =

1968 non-fiction book by Anaïs Nin

- First-edition cover
- Author: Anaïs Nin
- Language: English
- Genre: Non-fiction
- Publisher: Macmillan
- Publication date: 1968
- Media type: Print
- Pages: 214

The Novel of the Future is a non-fiction book by Anaïs Nin, published in 1968. In it she explores the nature of the creative process in relation to novel-writing, including concepts such as defamiliarization.
