= Joaquín Nin-Culmell =

Cuban-Spanish composer, concert pianist and emeritus professor of music

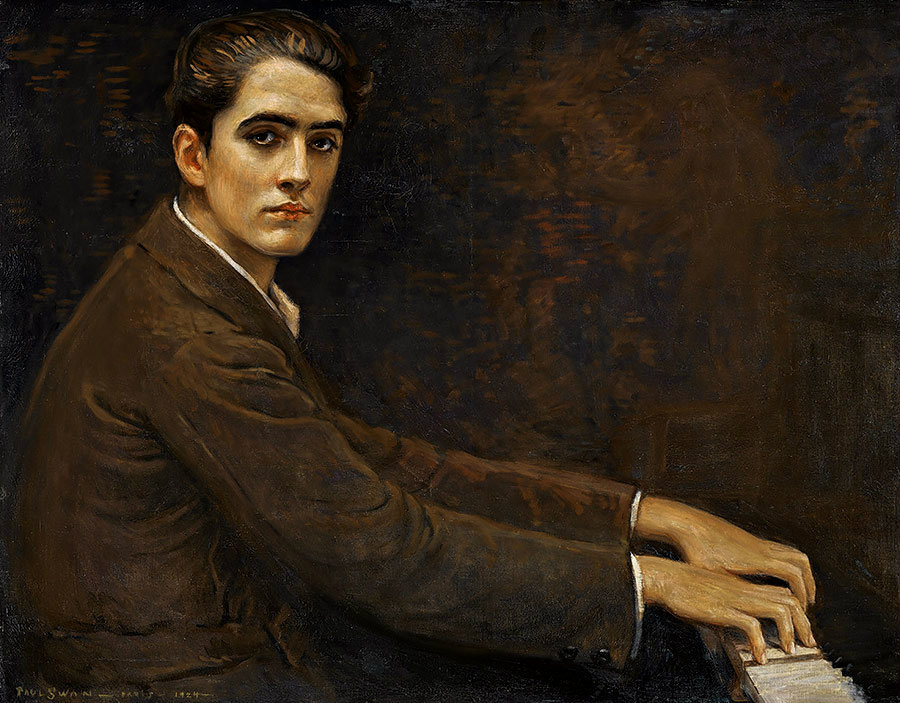

Background information
- Born: 5 September 1908; Berlin, Germany
- Died: 14 January 2004 (aged 95) Berkeley, California, United States
- Occupations: Musician, composer, and professor
- Instruments: Piano

Joaquín María Nin-Culmell (5 September 1908 – 14 January 2004) was a Cuban-Spanish composer, internationally known concert pianist, and emeritus professor of music at the University of California, Berkeley.

== Early life ==
Joaquín Nin-Culmell was born in Berlin, Germany, the youngest child of Joaquín Nin, a Cuban pianist and composer, and Rosa Culmell, a classically trained Cuban singer. After his parents separated, his mother moved Nin-Culmell, his sister Anaïs and brother Thorvald, to New York City, where they lived for nine years.

At age fifteen, Nin-Culmell and his family moved to Europe where he attended the Schola Cantorum and the Paris Conservatoire, receiving a first prize in music composition there in 1934. He was a student of Paul Dukas and also studied in the early 1930s with Manuel de Falla, Spain's foremost composer, focusing on harmony, counterpoint and fugue, as well as musical composition.

== Personal life ==
Nin-Culmell was a closet homosexual and lived with a male partner later in life.

== Career ==
In 1939, Nin-Culmell moved to the United States. He taught at Middlebury College in Vermont for two years before joining the music department of Williams College in Williamstown, Massachusetts (where Stephen Sondheim was one of his students). He stayed at Williams for a decade, before joining the faculty at UC Berkeley in 1950.

While at Berkeley, he conducted the University of California Symphony Orchestra and appeared as a pianist with numerous musical groups in the San Francisco Bay Area.

In 1952, he performed as soloist in his own Concerto in C major for piano and orchestra with the San Francisco Symphony, under the direction of Pierre Monteux, and was the symphony's guest conductor in March 1953.

His compositions include Cuban Folk Songs for mixed chorus, Catalonian Folk Songs for soprano and piano, and Eight Variations on a Theme by Gaspar Sanz for orchestra. Over time, his musical themes shifted from a regional sensibility to the religious. A commission from France resulted in the Symphony of Mysteries for organ and choir. In 1971, he composed a Mass for St. Mary's Cathedral in San Francisco.

Throughout his career, Nin-Culmell performed concerts in France, Italy, England, Switzerland, Cuba, Spain and Denmark, and was a member of many organizations: the International Society for Contemporary Music and the Composers' Forum, the Royal Academy of Fine Arts of San Fernando in Madrid (as was his pianist/composer father, Joaquin Nin), the Academy of Fine Arts of Sant Jordi in Barcelona, and the French Legion of Honor.

Aside from his musical activities, Nin-Culmell also found time to contribute prefaces to his sister Anaïs Nin's four-volume Early Diaries.

In 1974, Nin-Culmell retired from UC Berkeley. He continued to compose and perform, as well as mentoring many young artists and writers in the area, including the future publisher and managing editor of The Environmentalist, Janet Ritz, whose parents lived across the street from Nin-Culmell.

== Later years ==
Nin-Culmell continued composing into old age. In Spain, working with the cast for an opera he had written in 2001, he suffered a stroke. The event affected his eyesight and caused him to cut back on his composing and performing schedule.

On Christmas night, 2003, Nin-Culmell suffered a heart attack. He died twenty days later, on 14 January 2004, at the age of 95, in Berkeley, California. He died on the 27th anniversary of the death of his sister Anaïs.

His survivors include his niece, Gayle Nin Rosenkrantz of San Francisco, a nephew, Charles Thorvald Nin of Mexico City, their children and grandchildren, and the many musicians and composers Nin-Culmell mentored over the years. He was predeceased by his life partner, Theodore Reid.

The personal papers of Joaquín Nin-Culmell are preserved in the Biblioteca de Catalunya, the University of California Riverside and the University of California (Berkeley).
