= Delta of Venus =

1977 short story collection by Anaïs Nin

- First edition cover art
- Author: Anaïs Nin
- Cover artist: Milton Glaser; Richard Merkin (photo)
- Language: English
- Genre: Short stories, erotica
- Publisher: Harcourt Brace Jovanovich
- Publication date: 1977
- Publication place: United States
- Media type: Print (hardback & paperback)
- Pages: 250 pp (first edition)
- ISBN: 0-15-124656-4

Delta of Venus is a book of fifteen short stories that Anaïs Nin largely wrote in the 1940s as erotica for a private collector. It was published posthumously in 1977.

In 1994, a film inspired by the book was directed by Zalman King.

== Background ==
The short stories in this anthology were written during the 1940s for a private client known simply as "Collector". This "Collector" commissioned Nin, along with other now well-known writers (including Henry Miller and the poet George Barker), to produce erotic fiction for his private consumption. He has since been identified as Roy M. Johnson (1881–1960), a wealthy businessman from Ardmore, Oklahoma, who discovered the Healdton Oil Pool.

Despite being told to leave poetic language aside and concentrate on graphic, sexually-explicit scenarios, Nin gave the stories a literary flourish and a layer of images and ideas beyond the pornographic. In her diary, she jokingly called herself "the madam of this snobbish literary house of prostitution, from which vulgarity was excluded".

While using the Kama Sutra and other writings such as those of Krafft-Ebing as models, Nin was conscious that the languages of male and female sexuality were distinct. Although at times she scorned her erotica, and feared their effect on her literary reputation, they have been seen by sex-positive feminists as pioneering work.

== Short stories ==
The short stories that Delta of Venus anthologizes are:

1. The Hungarian Adventurer
2. Mathilde
3. The Boarding School
4. The Ring
5. Mallorca
6. Artists and Models
7. Lilith
8. Marianne
9. The Veiled Woman
10. Elena
11. The Basque and Bijou
12. Pierre
13. Manuel
14. Linda
15. Marcel

Its preface contains entries from Nin's Diary, which expressed her hope that its unexpurgated version would one day be published.

In 2021, the pornographic film studio Thousand Faces released a short film, Mathilde, based on Nin's story of the same name.

== See also ==
- D. H. Lawrence
- Émile Zola
- George Sand
- Mons pubis
