= Under a Glass Bell =

1944 book by Anaïs Nin

- First edition (1944)
- Author: Anaïs Nin
- Language: English
- Publication date: 1944

Under a Glass Bell, originally published in 1944 and subsequently published with several more editions, was the first book by Anaïs Nin to gain attention from the literary establishment. It was published by Nin's own printing press, which she named Gemor Press.

The book is a collection of short stories, with topics ranging from diary keeping ("The Labyrinth"), to life in Paris ("Houseboat"), to a late-term abortion ("The Birth").

== Publication history ==
The first edition of the book contained 8 short stories and a foreword, written in the late 1930s and early 1940s. As the book was republished, in 1947 Nin added two more novellas, a prose poem and another story. The 1948 edition removed the prose poem and foreword, but added four more short stories. The 1957 edition removed the two novellas; and that edition would remain in reprint until 1995 until Swallow Press/Ohio University Press republished it with a rearranged order of stories.

== Reception ==
Kirkus Reviews wrote that "Once again Miss Nin creates dream images, illusions of unreality and insanity with poetic if incomprehensible phrases, forming a montage of exotic impressions -- all nebulous."

In 2002 Alissa Levy Caiano produced a short film called 'The All-Seeing' based on Nin's short story of the same name Under a Glass Bell.
