= Mariemma =

Spanish dancer and choreographer

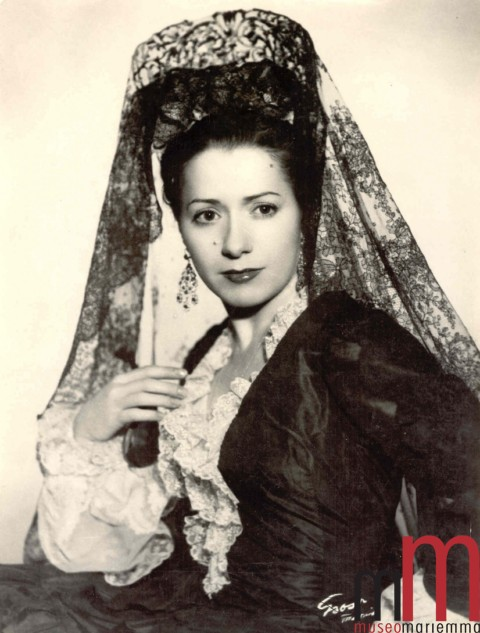
- Mariemma
- Born: Guillermina Teodosia Martínez Cabrejas; 10 January 1917; Íscar, Valladolid
- Died: 10 June 2008 (aged 91); Madrid
- Occupation(s): Dancer and choreographer
- Years active: 1926-2008

Guillermina Martínez Cabrejas (10 January 1917 – 10 June 2008), most known as Mariemma, was a Spanish dancer and choreographer. She died on 10 June 2008 at aged 91 in a nursing home from a cerebral hemorrhage.

Between 2008 and 2010 Daniel G. Cabrero wrote, produced and directed the biographical documentary film focussed on Mariemma's professional life and career and entitled My Paths through Dance. The film was premiered at the Semana Internacional de Cine de Valladolid on 30 October 2010.
