= Joaquín Nin =

Cuban pianist and composer (1879–1949)

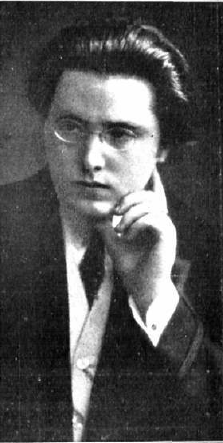
- Nin, c. 1912
- Born: Joaquín Nin y Castellanos; 29 September 1879; Havana, Captaincy General of Cuba, Spanish Empire
- Died: 24 October 1949 (aged 70); Havana, Republic of Cuba
- Spouse: Rosa Culmell
- Children: 3, including Anaïs Nin and Joaquín Nin-Culmell

Joaquín Nin y Castellanos (Note: In this Spanish name, the first or paternal surname is Nin and the second or maternal family name is Castellanos.) (29 September 1879 – 24 October 1949) was a Cuban pianist and composer. Nin was the father of Anaïs Nin.

== Biography ==
He was son of the Catalan writer Joaquim Nin Tudó and Ángela Castellanos Perdomo, a Cuban from Camagüey. Nin studied piano with Moritz Moszkowski and composition at the Schola Cantorum (where he taught from 1906 to 1908). He toured as a pianist and was known as a composer and arranger of popular Spanish folk music. Nin was a member of the Real Academia de Bellas Artes de San Fernando of Madrid and the French Legion of Honor.

Married since 1902 with the Cuban singer Rosa Culmell, they were the parents of writer Anaïs Nin, businessman Thorvald Nin, and composer Joaquín Nin-Culmell.

Joaquím Nin appears as one of the characters in the novel The Island of Eternal Love (Riverhead, 2008) by Cuban writer Daína Chaviano.

== Portrayal in Anaïs Nin's writings ==
In her memoirs and fiction, his daughter Anaïs Nin often attempts to consider aspects of her own nature by recalling how her father treated her as a child. Her "unexpurgated" diary volume Incest: From a Journal of Love describes an incestuous relationship with him in adulthood. She described him as an egotistical Don Juan and would often imitate him by affecting a "Doña Juana" persona.
