= Anaïs Nin =

French-born American author (1903–1977)

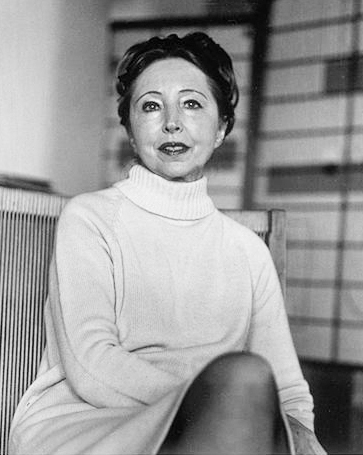
- Portrait in the 1970s by Elsa Dorfman
- Born: Angela Anaïs Juana Antolina Rosa Edelmira Nin y Culmell; 21 February 1903; Neuilly-sur-Seine, France
- Died: 14 January 1977 (aged 73); Los Angeles, California, U.S.
- Occupation: Author
- Spouses: Hugh Parker Guiler (m. 1923) Rupert Pole (m. 1955; ann. 1966) (bigamy)
- Father: Joaquín Nin
- Relatives: Joaquín Nin-Culmell (brother)

Angela Anaïs Juana Antolina Rosa Edelmira Nin y Culmell (Note: In this Spanish name, the first or paternal surname is Nin and the second or maternal family name is Culmell.) (/ˌænaɪˈiːs niːn/ AN-eye-EESS NEEN; French: [ana.is nin]; 21 February 1903 – 14 January 1977) was a French-born American diarist, essayist, novelist, and writer of short stories and erotica. Born to Cuban parents in France, Nin was the daughter of the composer Joaquín Nin and the classically trained singer Rosa Culmell. Nin spent her early years in Spain and Cuba, about sixteen years in Paris (1924–1940), and the remaining half of her life in the United States, where she became an established author.

Nin wrote journals prolifically from age eleven until her death. Her journals, many of which were published during her lifetime, detail her private thoughts and personal relationships. Her journals also describe her marriages to Hugh Parker Guiler and Rupert Pole, in addition to her numerous affairs with men and women, including the psychoanalyst Otto Rank and writer Henry Miller, both of whom profoundly influenced Nin and her writing.

In addition to her journals, Nin wrote several novels, critical studies, essays, short stories, and volumes of erotic literature. Much of her work, including the collections of erotica, was published posthumously amid renewed critical interest in her life and work. Nin spent her later life in Los Angeles, California, where she died of cervical cancer in 1977. She was a finalist for the Neustadt International Prize for Literature in 1976.

== Early life ==
Anaïs Nin was born in Neuilly, France, to Joaquín Nin, a Cuban pianist and composer, and Rosa Culmell, a classically trained Cuban singer. Her father's grandfather had fled France during the French Revolution, going first to Saint-Domingue, then New Orleans, and finally to Cuba, where he helped build the country's first railway.

Nin was raised a Roman Catholic but left the church when she was 16 years old. She spent her childhood and early life in Europe. Her parents separated when she was two; her mother then moved Nin and her two brothers, Thorvald Nin and Joaquín Nin-Culmell, to Barcelona, and then to New York City, where she attended high school. Nin dropped out of high school in 1919 at age sixteen, and according to her diaries, Volume One, 1931–1934, later began working as an artist's model. After being in the United States for several years, Nin had forgotten how to speak Spanish, but retained her French and became fluent in English.

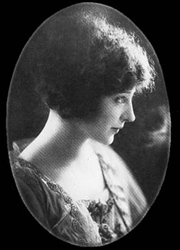
Anaïs Nin as a teenager, c. 1920

On 3 March 1923, in Havana, Cuba, Nin married her first husband, American Hugh Parker Guiler (1898–1985), a banker and artist from Boston, later known as "Ian Hugo", when he became an experimental filmmaker in the late 1940s. The couple moved to Paris the following year, where Guiler pursued his banking career and Nin began to pursue her interest in writing; in her diaries she also mentions having trained as a flamenco dancer in Paris in the mid-to-late 1920s with Francisco Miralles Arnau. Her first published work was a critical 1932 evaluation of D. H. Lawrence called D. H. Lawrence: An Unprofessional Study, which she wrote in sixteen days.

Nin became interested in psychoanalysis and studied extensively, first with René Allendy in 1932 and then with Otto Rank. Both men eventually became her lovers, as she recounts in her Journal. On her second visit to Rank, Nin reflects on her desire to be reborn as a woman and artist. Rank, she observes, helped her move between what she could verbalize in her journals and what remained unarticulated. She discovered the quality and depth of her feelings in the wordless transitions between what she could and could not say. "As he talked, I thought of my difficulties with writing, my struggles to articulate feelings not easily expressed. Of my struggles to find a language for intuition, feeling, instincts which are, in themselves, elusive, subtle, and wordless."

In late summer 1939, when residents from overseas were urged to leave France due to the approaching war, Nin left Paris and returned to New York City with her husband (Guiler was, according to his own wishes, edited out of the diaries published during Nin's lifetime; his role in her life is therefore difficult to evaluate). During the war, Nin sent her books to Frances Steloff of the Gotham Book Mart in New York for safekeeping.

In New York, Nin rejoined Otto Rank, who had previously moved there, and moved into his apartment. She actually began to act as a psychoanalyst herself, seeing patients in the room next to Rank's. She quit after several months, however, stating: "I found that I wasn't good because I wasn't objective. I was haunted by my patients. I wanted to intercede." It was in New York that she met the Japanese-American modernist photographer Soichi Sunami, who went on to photograph her for many of her books.

== Literary career ==
=== Journals ===
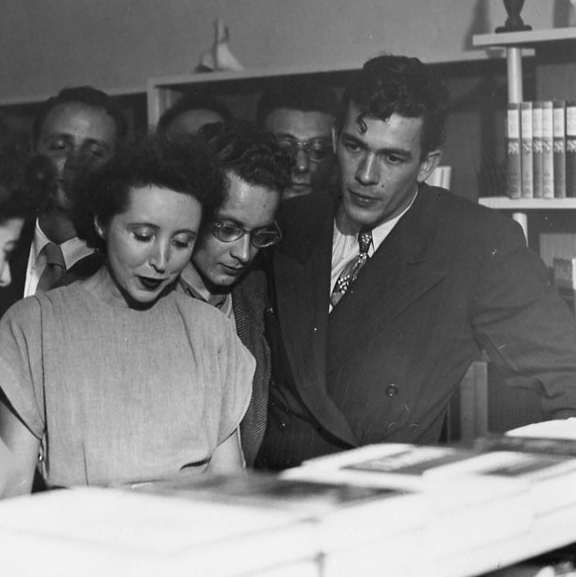
Nin at a book reading with George Leite in Berkeley, California, 1946

The spread of her fame grew in 1960 when she published her diaries, a work that is considered her first, given that she began keeping them at the age of 11. She published selections covering the years from 1931 to 1974. Nin's most studied works are her diaries or journals, which she began writing in her adolescence. The published journals, which span six decades, provide insight into her personal life and relationships. Nin was acquainted, often intimately, with a number of prominent authors, artists, psychoanalysts, and other figures, and wrote of them often, especially Otto Rank. She initially wrote in French and did not begin to write in English until she was 17. Nin felt that French was the language of her heart, Spanish was the language of her ancestors, and English was the language of her intellect. The writing in her diaries is explicitly trilingual; she uses whichever language best expresses her thought.

In the second volume of her unexpurgated journal, Incest, she wrote about her father candidly and graphically (207–15), detailing her incestuous adult sexual relationship with him.

Previously unpublished works were released in the two academic journals Anais: An International Journal and A Café in Space: The Anaïs Nin Literary Journal.

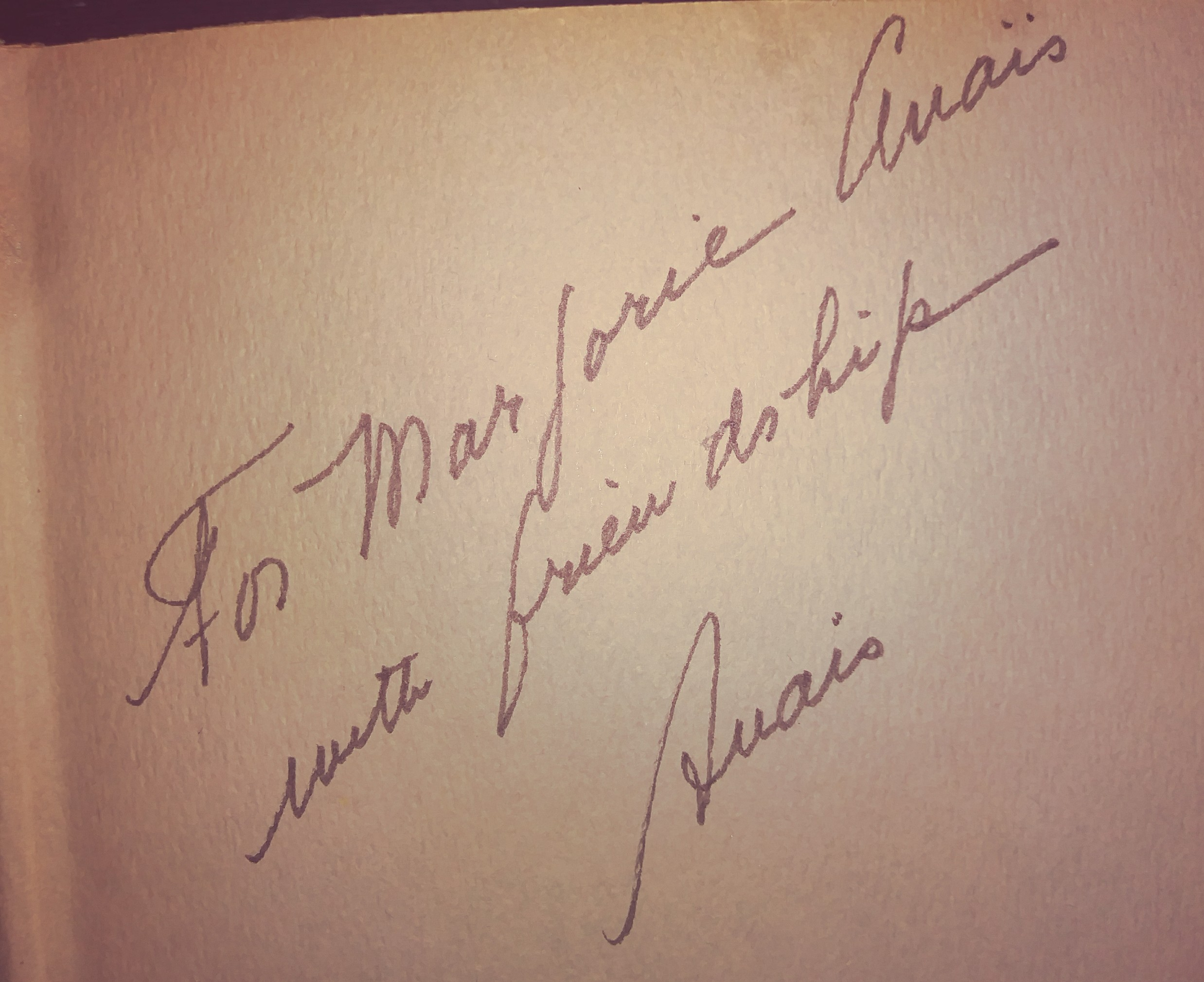
Anais Nin's handwritten inscription to Marjorie Anais Housepian Dobkin.

As of 2026, 19 volumes of her journals have been published.

=== Erotic writings ===
Nin is hailed by many critics as one of the finest writers of female erotica. She was one of the first women known to explore fully the realm of erotic writing, and certainly the first prominent woman in the modern West known to write erotica. Before her, erotica acknowledged to be written by women was rare, with a few notable exceptions, such as the work of Kate Chopin. Nin often cited authors Djuna Barnes and D. H. Lawrence as inspirations, and she states in Volume One of her diaries that she drew inspiration from Marcel Proust, André Gide, Jean Cocteau, Paul Valéry, and Arthur Rimbaud.

According to Volume One of her diaries, 1931–1934, published in 1966, Nin first came across erotica when she returned to Paris with her husband, mother and two brothers in her late teens. They rented the apartment of an American man who was away for the summer, and Nin came across a number of French paperbacks: "One by one, I read these books, which were completely new to me. I had never read erotic literature in America... They overwhelmed me. I was innocent before I read them, but by the time I had read them all, there was nothing I did not know about sexual exploits... I had my degree in erotic lore."

Faced with a desperate need for money, Nin, Henry Miller and some of their friends began in the 1940s to write erotic and pornographic narratives for an anonymous "collector" for a dollar a page, somewhat as a joke. (It is not clear whether Miller actually wrote these stories or merely allowed his name to be used.) Nin considered the characters in her erotica to be extreme caricatures and never intended the work to be published, but changed her mind in the early 1970s and allowed them to be published as Delta of Venus and Little Birds. In 2016, a previously undiscovered collection of Nin's erotica, Auletris, was published for the first time.

Nin was a friend, and in some cases lover, of many literary figures, including Miller, John Steinbeck, Antonin Artaud, Edmund Wilson, Gore Vidal, James Agee, James Leo Herlihy, and Lawrence Durrell. Her passionate love affair and friendship with Miller strongly influenced her both sexually and as an author. Claims that Nin was bisexual were given added circulation by the 1990 Philip Kaufman film Henry & June about Miller and his second wife June Miller. The first unexpurgated portion of Nin's journal to be published, Henry and June, makes clear that Nin was stirred by June to the point of saying (paraphrasing), "I have become June", though it is unclear to what extent she consummated her feelings sexually. To both Anaïs and Henry, June was a femme fatale – irresistible, cunning, and erotic. Nin gave June money, jewelry, and clothes, often leaving herself without money.

=== Novels and other publications ===
In addition to her journals and collections of erotica, Nin wrote several novels, which critics frequently associated with the surrealist movement. Her first book of fiction, House of Incest (1936), contains heavily veiled allusions to a brief sexual relationship Nin had with her father in 1933: while visiting her estranged father in France, the then-30-year-old Nin had a brief incestuous sexual relationship with him. In 1944, she published a collection of short stories, Under a Glass Bell, which was reviewed by Edmund Wilson.

Nin also wrote several works of nonfiction. Her first publication, written during her years studying psychoanalysis, was D. H. Lawrence: An Unprofessional Study (1932), an assessment of the works of D. H. Lawrence. In 1968, she published The Novel of the Future, which elaborated on her approach to writing and the writing process.

== Personal life ==
According to her diaries, Vol. 1, 1931–1934, Nin shared a bohemian lifestyle with Henry Miller during her time in Paris. Her husband Guiler is not mentioned in the published edition of the 1930s parts of her diary (Vol. 1–2), though the opening of Vol. 1 makes clear that she is married, and the introduction suggests her husband declined to be included in the published diaries. The diaries edited by her second husband, after her death, say that her relationship with Miller was very passionate and physical, and that she believed that it was a pregnancy by him that was stillborn in 1934.

In 1947, at age 44, Nin met former actor Rupert Pole in a Manhattan elevator on her way to a party. The two began a relationship and traveled to California together; Pole was 16 years her junior. On 17 March 1955, while still married to Guiler, she married Pole at Quartzsite, Arizona, returning with him to live in California. Guiler remained in New York City and was unaware of Nin's second marriage until after her death in 1977, though biographer Deirdre Bair alleges that Guiler knew what was happening while Nin was in California but consciously "chose not to know".

Nin called her simultaneous marriages her "bicoastal trapeze". According to Deidre Bair:

[Anaïs] would set up these elaborate façades in Los Angeles and in New York, but it became so complicated that she had to create something she called the lie box. She had this absolutely enormous purse and in the purse she had two sets of checkbooks. One said Anaïs Guiler for New York and another said Anaïs Pole for Los Angeles. She had prescription bottles from California doctors and New York doctors with the two different names. And she had a collection of file cards. And she said, "I tell so many lies I have to write them down and keep them in the lie box so I can keep them straight."

In 1966, Nin had her marriage with Pole annulled due to the legal issues arising from both Guiler and Pole trying to claim her as a dependent on their tax returns, but she and Pole continued to live together as if married until her death. According to Barbara Kraft, Nin wrote to Guiler asking for his forgiveness. He responded by saying how meaningful his life had been because of her.

After Guiler's death in 1985, Pole commissioned the unexpurgated versions of Nin's journals. Eight volumes have been published, covering the years 1931 through 1977: Henry and June, Incest, Fire, Nearer the Moon, Mirages, Trapeze, The Diary of Others: The Unexpurgated Diary of Anaïs Nin, 1955-1966, and A Joyous Transformation: The Unexpurgated Diary of Anaïs Nin, 1966-1977. Pole arranged for Guiler's ashes to be scattered in the same area where Nin's ashes were, Mermaid Cove in Santa Monica Bay. Pole died in 2006.

Nin once worked at Lawrence R. Maxwell Books, at 45 Christopher Street in New York City. In addition to her work as a writer, Nin appeared in the Kenneth Anger film Inauguration of the Pleasure Dome (1954) as Astarte; in the Maya Deren film Ritual in Transfigured Time (1946); and in Bells of Atlantis (1952), a film Guiler directed under the name "Ian Hugo" with a soundtrack of electronic music by Louis and Bebe Barron. In her later life, Nin worked as a tutor at the International College in Los Angeles.

== Death ==
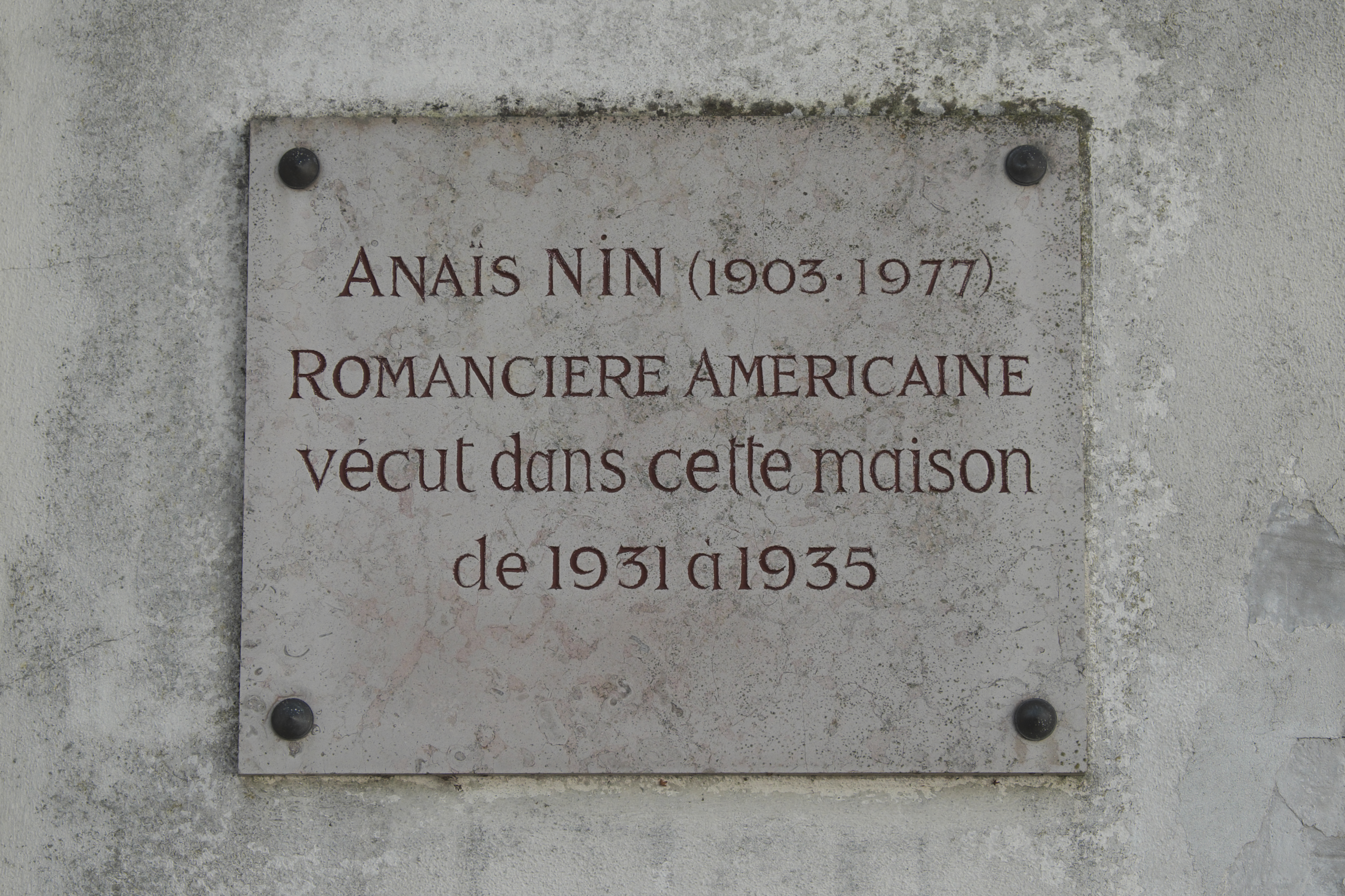
Plaque at Nin's Louveciennes home

Nin was diagnosed with cervical cancer in 1974. She had cancer for two years as it metastasized, and she underwent numerous surgical operations, radiation, and chemotherapy. Nin died of the cancer at Cedars-Sinai Medical Center in Los Angeles, California, on 14 January 1977.

Her body was cremated and her ashes scattered over Santa Monica Bay in Mermaid Cove. Her first husband, Hugh Guiler, died in 1985, and his ashes were scattered in the same cove. Rupert Pole was named Nin's literary executor, and he arranged to have new, unexpurgated editions of Nin's books and diaries published between 1985 and his death in 2006. Large portions of the diaries are still available only in expurgated form. The originals are in the UCLA Library.

== Legacy ==
The feminist movement in the 1960s gave feminist perspectives on Nin's writings of the past twenty years, which made Nin a popular lecturer at various universities; contrarily, Nin dissociated herself from the political activism of the movement.

In 1973, prior to her death, Nin received an honorary doctorate from the Philadelphia College of Art. She was also elected to the United States National Institute of Arts and Letters in 1974, and in 1976 was presented with a Los Angeles Times Woman of the Year award.

The newsletter,Under the Sign of Pisces: Anaïs Nin and Her Circle, edited by Richard Centing, was published by the Ohio State University Libraries from 1970– 1981.

Although she was described as a narcissist her feminist tendencies, along with her constant search for self-knowledge, made her an attractive speaker for lectures at American universities.

The Italian film La stanza delle parole (dubbed into English as The Room of Words) was released in 1989 based on the Henry and June diaries. Philip Kaufman directed the 1990 film Henry & June based on Nin's diaries published as Henry and June: From the Unexpurgated Diary of Anaïs Nin. She was portrayed in the film by actress Maria de Medeiros.

In February 2008, poet Steven Reigns organized Anaïs Nin at 105 at the Hammer Museum in Westwood, Los Angeles. Reigns said: "Nin bonded and formed very deep friendships with women and men decades younger than her. Some of them are still living in Los Angeles and I thought it'd be wonderful to have them share their experiences with [Nin]." Bebe Barron, an electronic music pioneer and longtime friend of Nin, made her last public appearance at this event. Reigns also published an essay refuting Bern Porter's claims of a sexual relationship with Nin in the 1930s. Reigns is the President of the Board of the non-profit organization devoted to Nin's legacy, the Anaïs Nin Foundation. In 2025, Reigns discovered and rescued an archive of Nin's papers and possessions. The items were stored in cardboard boxes in a metal container on a hillside vulnerable to fires and earthquakes. Shortly after he moved the materials to safe storage, the area was indeed ravaged by fire.

Cuban-American writer Daína Chaviano paid homage to Anaïs Nin and Henry Miller in her novel Gata encerrada (2001), where both characters are portrayed as disembodied spirits whose previous lives they shared with Melisa, the main character—and presumably Chaviano's alter ego—, a young Cuban obsessed with Anaïs Nin.

The Cuban poet and novelist Wendy Guerra, long fascinated with Nin's life and works, published a fictional diary in Nin's voice, Posar desnuda en la Habana (Posing Nude in Havana) in 2012. She explained that "[Nin's] Cuban Diary has very few pages and my delirium was always to write an apocryphal novel; literary conjecture about what might have happened".

On 27 September 2013, screenwriter and author Kim Krizan published an article in The Huffington Post revealing she had found a previously unpublished love letter written by Gore Vidal to Nin. This letter contradicts Gore Vidal's previous characterization of his relationship with Nin, showing that Vidal did have feelings for Nin that he later heavily disavowed in his autobiography, Palimpsest. Krizan did this research in the run up to the release of the fifth volume of Anaïs Nin's uncensored diary, Mirages, for which Krizan provided the foreword.

In 2015, a documentary film directed by Sarah Aspinall called The Erotic Adventures of Anais Nin was released, in which Lucy Cohu portrayed Nin's character.

In 2019, Kim Krizan published Spy in the House of Anaïs Nin, an examination of long-buried letters, papers, and original manuscripts Krizan found while doing archival work in Nin's Los Angeles home. Also that year, Routledge published the book Anaïs Nin: A Myth of Her Own by Clara Oropeza, that analyzes Nin's literature and literary theory through the perspective of mythological studies and depth psychology.

== Bibliography ==
=== Diaries ===
- The Diary of Anaïs Nin, in 7 volumes
- The Early Diary of Anaïs Nin (1914–1931) in 4 volumes
  - Linotte: 1914-20 (1987)
  - 1920-23 (1983)
  - The Journal of a Wife: 1923-27 (1984)
  - 1927-31 (1985)
- Henry and June: From a Journal of Love. The Unexpurgated Diary of Anaïs Nin (1931–1932) (1986), edited by Rupert Pole after her death
- Incest: From a Journal of Love (1992)
- Fire: From a Journal of Love (1995)
- Nearer the Moon: From a Journal of Love (1996)
- Mirages: The Unexpurgated Diary of Anaïs Nin, 1939–1947 (2013)
- Trapeze: The Unexpurgated Diary of Anaïs Nin, 1947–1955 (2017)
- The Diary of Others: The Unexpurgated Diary of Anaïs Nin, 1955–1966 (2021)
- A Joyous Transformation: The Unexpurgated Diary of Anaïs Nin, 1966–1977 (2023)

=== Correspondence ===
- A Literate Passion: Letters of Anaïs Nin & Henry Miller 1932–1953 (1988)
- Letters to a friend in Australia (1992)
- Arrows of Longing: Correspondence Between Anaïs Nin & Felix Pollack, 1952–1976 (1998)
- Morale des épicentres (2004)
- Anais Nin Letters: Her Correspondence With a Young Fan. Edited by Moira Collins (The Avalon Archives, 2018)
- Reunited: The Correspondence of Anaïs and Joaquin Nin, 1933–1940 (2020)
- Letters to Lawrence Durrell 1937–1977 (2020)

=== Novels ===
- House of Incest (1936)
- Winter of Artifice (1939)
- Cities of the Interior (1959), in five volumes:
  - Ladders to Fire
  - Children of the Albatross
  - The Four-Chambered Heart
  - A Spy in the House of Love
  - Seduction of the Minotaur, originally published as Solar Barque (1958).
- Collages (1964)

=== Short stories ===
- Under a Glass Bell and Other Stories (1944)

Published posthumously:

- Delta of Venus (1977) erotica from the 1940s
- Waste of Timelessness and Other Early Stories (1977) apprentice work written before 1932
- Little Birds (1979) erotica from the 1940s
- Auletris (2016) erotica from the 1940s

Nin agreed in principle to the publication of the first three before she died — reluctantly in the case of the erotica.

=== Non-fiction ===
- D. H. Lawrence: An Unprofessional Study (1932)
- The Novel of the Future (1968)
- A Woman Speaks (1975)
- In Favor of the Sensitive Man (1976)
- Conversations with Anaïs Nin (1994) edited by Wendy M. DuBow
- The Mystic of Sex: Uncollected Writings, 1930-1974 (1995)

== Filmography ==
- Ritual in Transfigured Time (1946): Short film, dir. Maya Deren
- Lascivious Folk Ballet (1946) - (Outtakes from Ritual in Transfigured Time).
- Bells of Atlantis (1952): Short film, dir. Ian Hugo
- Tropical Noah's Ark (1952).
- Inauguration of the Pleasure Dome (1954): Short film, dir. Kenneth Anger
- Jazz of Lights (1954)
- Melodic Inversion (1958)
- Lectures pour tous (1964)
- Anaïs Nin Her Diary (1966)
- Un moment avec une grande figure de la littérature, Anaïs Nin (3 May 1968)
- The Henry Miller Odyssey (1969).
- Through the Magiscope (1969).
- Apertura (1970).
- Anaïs Nin at the University of California, Berkeley (December 1971)
- Anaïs Nin at Hampshire College, (1972)
- Anaïs Nin Interview, (New York, 1972).
- 'Ouvrez les guillemets (11 November 1974)
- Journal de Paris (21 November 1974)
- Anais Nin Observed (1974): Documentary, dir. Robert Snyder

== See also ==
- List of Cuban American writers
- List of Cuban Americans

== Works cited ==
- Bair, Deirdre (1995). Anaïs Nin: A Biography. Putnam. ISBN 978-0399139888.
- Fitch, Noël Riley (1993). Anaïs: The Erotic Life of Anaïs Nin. Little, Brown and Company. ISBN 978-0316284288.
- Franklin, Benjamin V., ed. (1996). Recollections of Anaïs Nin. Ohio University Press. ISBN 978-0821411643.
- Nin, Anaïs (1966). The Diary of Anaïs Nin (1931–1934). Vol. 1. Harcourt, Brace & World. ISBN 978-0547538709.
- Nin, Anaïs (1967). The Diary of Anaïs Nin (1934–1939). Vol. 2. Harcourt, Brace & World. ISBN 978-0156260268.
- Nin, Anaïs; DuBow, Wendy M. (1994). Conversations with Anaïs Nin. University Press of Mississippi. ISBN 978-0878057191.
