= Rupert Pole =

Literary executor of Anaïs Nin

- Born: February 18, 1919; Los Angeles, California, United States
- Died: July 15, 2006 (aged 87); Los Angeles, California, United States
- Occupation: Actor
- Spouse: Anaïs Nin

Rupert Pole (February 18, 1919 – July 15, 2006) was an American actor and the husband of author Anaïs Nin, as well as her literary executor.

== Early life and education ==
Pole was born in Los Angeles. His father, Reginald, was a highly regarded Shakespearean actor. His parents divorced when he was a boy, and his mother, Helen Taggart, married Lloyd Wright, a son of noted architect Frank Lloyd Wright. Pole played both the guitar and viola, and received a degree in music from Harvard University in 1940. During World War II he performed in USO shows with Jane Lloyd-Jones, to whom he was briefly married.

== Anaïs Nin ==
The Broadway run of The Duchess of Malfi, in which Pole had a supporting role, had just ended in 1947 when he met Nin. They met in an elevator as both were en route to a party given by an heir to the Guggenheim fortune. He was 28 and she was 44 at the time. In her diary entry that evening, Nin noted his emotional sensitivity and knowledge of Eastern philosophies and concluded the entry with "Danger! He is probably homosexual."

Pole, who was under the impression that Nin had divorced her first husband Hugh Parker Guiler, asked Nin to accompany him to the West Coast. Nin agreed to do so, but told Guiler she was accompanying a friend on a drive to Las Vegas.

Pole received a degree in forestry from the University of California, Berkeley in 1950 and joined the U.S. Forest Service. He and Nin lived a rustic life in a cabin in the Sierra Madre, where Nin introduced herself as Mrs. Anaïs Pole even though she was still married to Guiler.

Nin and Pole were married by a justice of the peace in Quartzsite, Arizona, on March 17, 1955. She kept her marriage to Guiler secret from Pole for 11 years, but concern about the legal consequences of having two men claim her as a dependent on their tax returns led her to arranging the annulment in 1966 of the marriage with Pole.

Nin remained married to Guiler, citing his decades of financial support, but spent her final years with Pole. She and Pole lived in a small house in Los Angeles' Silver Lake neighborhood that Pole had built with money saved from his job as forest ranger and later as a science teacher at Thomas Starr King Junior High School in Los Angeles. The house was designed by Pole's half-brother and Frank Lloyd Wright's grandson, Eric Lloyd Wright.

== Nin's death ==
When Nin died in 1977, her obituary in the Los Angeles Times listed Pole as her husband, while The New York Times named Guiler as her spouse. Pole described his experience for the UK's Daily Telegraph in 1998, saying "I was jealous, yes. But I played the same games as Hugo, pretending to believe her. In a way, I did not care. My idea of marriage is different. We had a wonderful, deep relationship, and that is what counted. I was not interested in conventional women or in conventional marriage."

As Nin's literary executor, Pole was responsible for supervising the preparation of new posthumous editions of her works for publication from 1986 to 1996, restoring erotic content that had been made less explicit in the versions published while she lived. On Guiler's death in 1985, Pole scattered his ashes in the same place as Nin's, a cove on the coast at Santa Monica.

== Death ==
Pole suffered a stroke in 2006, and died in his sleep two weeks later, at his home in Los Angeles. For his obituary in The New York Times Nin's biographer, Deirdre Bair, told a reporter: "He was sort of a great cipher. He was stunningly handsome. Incredibly shy. And just very incredibly self-effacing. [Nin] was his star: everything radiated around her, and he loved being in her background."
