= Deirdre Bair =

American literary scholar and biographer (1935–2020)

- Born: Deirdre Bartolotta; June 21, 1935; Pittsburgh, Pennsylvania, US
- Died: April 17, 2020 (aged 84); New Haven, Connecticut, US
- Education: Columbia University (MA, PhD); University of Pennsylvania (BA)
- Occupation: Biographer
- Writing career
- Period: 1978–2019
- Notable awards: National Book Award (1981)

Deirdre Bair (June 21, 1935 – April 17, 2020) was an American literary scholar and biographer. She won a National Book Award for her biography of Samuel Beckett in 1981.

== Early life and education ==
Bair was born Deirdre Bartolotta on June 21, 1935 in Pittsburgh. She grew up in nearby Monongahela, Pennsylvania. Her father was a small-business owner, her mother a homemaker. She had one sister and one brother.

Bair earned a Bachelor of Arts degree in English from the University of Pennsylvania in 1957. She went on to earn her Master of Arts degree (1968) and Doctor of Philosophy degree (1972), both in comparative literature, at Columbia University. She worked as a stringer for Newsweek and a reporter for the New Haven Register before earning her doctorate.

== Academic career ==
Starting in 1976, Bair served as a professor of comparative literature at the University of Pennsylvania. She resigned in 1988 to write full-time.

At various times during her life, Bair served as a visiting professor, writer in residence, or distinguished scholar at Ohio State University, Bennington College, Macquarie University, Griffith University, and Australian National University. She was also a visiting lecturer at Paris VII, University of Kassel, Uppsala University, and University College Dublin.

Bair was awarded fellowships from the John Simon Guggenheim Memorial Foundation, the Rockefeller Foundation, the New York Institute for the Humanities, the Radcliffe Institute for Advanced Study (then the Bunting Institute), and the University of Connecticut Humanities Institute, among other institutions.

== Writings ==
Bair authored seven biographies and one autobiography during her lifetime. She received a 1981 National Book Award for Samuel Beckett: A Biography (1978). (Note: Samuel Beckett won the 1981 award for paperback "Autobiography/Biography". From 1980 to 1983 in National Book Award history there were dual hardcover and paperback awards in most categories, and several nonfiction subcategories including General Nonfiction. Most of the paperback award-winners were reprints, including this one.) Her biographies of Simone de Beauvoir and Carl Jung were finalists for the Los Angeles Times Book Prize in 1991 and 2004, respectively. Her biographies of Anaïs Nin (1996) and de Beauvoir (2001) were selected by The New York Times as Best Books of the Year. Her biography of Jung won the Gradiva Award from the National Association for the Advancement of Psychoanalysis in 2004.

Bair's Calling It Quits: Late-Life Divorce and Starting Over (2007) was profiled on CBS’s The Early Show, NBC's The Today Show, the Brian Lehrer radio show, and CBC Canada. She published a biography of cartoonist Saul Steinberg in 2012 (it was named a New York Times Notable Book) and a biography of Chicago mobster Al Capone in 2016, using previously unknown sources from his family. Her final book, Parisian Lives, related her experiences as Beckett's and de Beauvoir's biographer. Parisian Lives was a finalist for the 2020 Pulitzer Prize for Biography.

== Personal life ==
Bair married museum administrator Lavon Henry Bair in 1957. The couple had two children, Katney Bair and Vonn Scott Bair. She divorced her husband in 2007.

Bair died of a heart attack at home in New Haven, Connecticut, on April 17, 2020. She was survived by her children and other relatives. Her ex-husband predeceased her in 2012.

== Bibliography ==
- Deirdre Bair (1978). Samuel Beckett: A Biography. Simon and Schuster. ISBN 978-0-671-69173-8.
- Deirdre Bair (1990). Simone de Beauvoir: A Biography. Random House. ISBN 978-0-09-943347-7.
- Deirdre Bair (1996). Anais Nin. Bloomsbury. ISBN 978-0-7475-2542-4.
- Deirdre Bair (2007). Calling it Quits: Late-life Divorce and Starting Over. Random House. ISBN 978-1-4000-6448-9.
- Deirdre Bair (2008). Jung: A Biography. Paw Prints. ISBN 978-1-4352-9126-3.
- Deirdre Bair (2012). Saul Steinberg: A Biography. Knopf Doubleday. ISBN 978-0-385-53498-7.
- Deirdre Bair (2016). Al Capone: His Life, Legacy, and Legend. Knopf Doubleday. ISBN 978-0-385-53716-2.
- Deirdre Bair (2019). Parisian Lives: Samuel Beckett, Simone de Beauvoir, and Me. Nan A. Talese/Doubleday. ISBN 9780385542456.
