= House of Incest =

1936 book by Anaïs Nin

- First US edition (1947)
- Author: Anaïs Nin
- Publisher: Siana Editions (France self published), Gemor Press (US translation)
- Publication date: 1936 (US edition 1947)
- Publication place: France
- Media type: Print (Hardback & Paperback)
- Pages: 72 p. (reissue paperback edition)
- ISBN: 0-8040-0148-0 (reissue paperback edition)
- OCLC: 19921905
- Dewey Decimal: 811/.54 20
- LC Class: PS3527.I865 H6 1989

House of Incest is a 1936 prose poem written by Anaïs Nin.

== Plot introduction ==
Nin was a patient of Otto Rank while writing House of Incest. Rank was an early disciple of Freud, serving as his Vienna group's secretary and youngest member, but had long since dissented from Freudian orthodoxy and developed his own theoretical school.

Rank helped Anaïs edit House of Incest. He had experience with this topic, as Otto Rank's most famous book is The Trauma of Birth. Anaïs Nin describes the process as akin to being "[e]jected from a paradise of soundlessness.... thrown up on a rock, the skeleton of a ship choked in its own sails."

== Literary significance and criticism ==
In Anaïs Nin: An Introduction, authors Duane Schneider and Benjamin Franklin V both argue that the basic theme of House of Incest is that ultimately life in the real world, which contains both pleasure and pain, is preferable to any self-created world that attempts to include only pleasure. Franklin and Schneider argue that a world consisting only of pleasure is ultimately a sterile world where intellectual, emotional, and spiritual growth is not possible, and what results is stunted people. In this, they offer the passage from House of Incest wherein Anaïs Nin writes, "Worlds self-made and self-nourished are so full of ghosts and monsters."

=== The prose of House of Incest ===
The prose of House of Incest is considered by many to be one of the major challenges of the work. The prose and tone of the work is not linear and does not utilize everyday language. Rather, the book is written in prose that is often described as either surrealist or symbolist.

"My first vision of earth was water veiled. I am of the race of men and women who see all things through this curtain of sea and my eyes are the color of water. I looked with chameleon eyes upon the changing face of the world, looked with anonymous vision upon my uncompleted self." (p. 15)

Duane Schneider and Benjamin Franklin V write that the prose of House of Incest is so challenging that it requires the total attention of the reader.

== Allusions/references to actual history, geography and current science ==
=== Incest in the Nin family ===
As was eventually revealed in the 1990s when the unexpurgated versions of Anaïs Nin's diaries were published, Anaïs Nin claims to have had an incestuous relationship with her own father during her late 20s. It has been claimed that this incestuous relationship was encouraged by one of her therapists, who suggested that in retaliation for her father's abandonment of her during her childhood, Anaïs Nin should seduce her father in adulthood and then abandon him. In theory, this was supposed to leave Anaïs Nin feeling empowered.

It has been written that at the time of the publication of House of Incest, which took place at around the same time that Anaïs Nin was having an incestuous relationship with her father, some members of the Nin family who knew about the incestuous relationship were "horrified" to know that Anaïs Nin was writing a book with this title. They assumed that the book was going to be an exposé on the father/daughter incestuous relationship.

As has been discussed above, the "incest" referred to in the book is largely a metaphor for a type of self-love or obsession with what is the same or similar to oneself. However, Nin's relationship with her father is present in some instances, such as:

"Stumbling from room to room I came into the room of paintings, and there sat Lot with his hand upon his daughter's breast while the city burned behind them, cracking open and falling into the sea." (p. 52)

The book itself, and its meanings as well as subtleties, are derived directly from the experiences shared between herself and her father. The sameness and feeling of love for each other were in actuality the facades of a love which reflected only themselves and their similarities. Her use of the word "incest" is not only metaphorical in the sense that it describes such an inter-relationship between states, but between psychological aspects as well as the obviously physical interactions they may contain.

=== Love in Incest ===
Other sources claim Nin's writings in House of Incest are a symbolic representation of the passionate love affair between Nin and Henry Miller, a continuation of Henry and June:

"In her published fiction ... Anaïs Nin could disguise biographical facts, the truth told as a "fairy tale" – as she clued in readers of her first book of poetic prose, House of Incest"

== See also ==
- Nocturnal
