= Henry and June =

1986 book excerpted from diaries of Anaïs Nin

Henry and June: From the Unexpurgated Diary of Anaïs Nin
- First edition
- Author: Anaïs Nin
- Language: English
- Genre: Memoir, Diary
- Publisher: Harcourt Brace Jovanovich
- Publication date: 1986
- Media type: Print (Hardcover and Paperback)
- ISBN: 978-0-15-140003-4
- OCLC: 13333571
- Dewey Decimal: 818/.5203 B 19
- LC Class: PS3527.I865 Z4642 1986

Henry and June: From the Unexpurgated Diary of Anaïs Nin (full title Henry and June: From a Journal of Love: The Unexpurgated Diary of Anaïs Nin 1931–1932) is a 1986 book that is based upon material excerpted from the unpublished diaries of Anaïs Nin. It corresponds temporally to the first volume of Nin's published diaries, written between October 1931 and October 1932, yet is radically different, in that the book begins with a description of the landscape of and around her home and never mentions her husband, whereas Henry and June begins with discussion of Nin's sex life and is full of her struggles and passionate relationship with husband Hugo, and then, as the diary/memoir progresses, other lovers.

This, the first of the unexpurgated diaries, concentrates on her passionate involvement with the writer Henry Miller and his wife June Miller.

Nin's source material—her diaries—was able to spawn two dramatically different narratives about the same time period, both widely read and praised. The expurgated diary reveals Nin the philosopher and amateur but astute psychologist. The unexpurgated diary reveals a woman breaking out into wild sexual discovery. It is introduced by her second—bigamous—husband. A film based on the book was released in 1990.

== Plot ==
At the end of 1931, Nin finds herself dissatisfied with being a timid, faithful wife to her banker husband, Hugh Parker Guiler. Nin and her husband contemplate the possibility of opening their relationship, and determine that it would threaten their marriage. However, when Anais meets June Miller, she is magnetically drawn to her and perceives June to be the most beautiful and charismatic woman she has ever met. Nin pursues an extremely intense, ambiguous, sexually charged friendship with her. When June leaves, Nin becomes involved with Henry, and begins an uninhibited sexual and emotional affair with him, which prompts an intellectual and sensual awakening. A friendship is formed between the two that was maintained throughout both artists' lives.

== Adaptations ==
The book was later filmed as Henry & June directed by Philip Kaufman, with Fred Ward as Henry, Uma Thurman as June, and Maria de Medeiros as Anaïs Nin. The movie, released in 1990, was the first film to be released in the United States with an NC-17 rating.

The same year the book was also adapted into a film as The Room of Words (La stanza delle parole), a low-budget Italian production directed by Franco Molé.
