= Ian Hugo =

American printmaker and filmmaker (1898–1985)

- Born: Hugh Parker Guiler; February 15, 1898; Boston, Massachusetts, U.S.
- Died: January 7, 1985 (aged 86); New York City, U.S.
- Education: Columbia University
- Occupations: Engraver and filmmaker
- Spouse: Anaïs Nin (m. 1923; died 1977)

Hugh Parker Guiler (February 15, 1898 – January 7, 1985), also known as Ian Hugo, was Anaïs Nin's husband from 1923 until her death in 1977, and an engraver and filmmaker.

== Biography ==
Guiler was born in Boston, Massachusetts, to Hugh Cheyne Guiler and Meta Parker Guiler. He had a brother John and two sisters Edith and Ethel. He lived in Puerto Rico as a child, and went to school in Scotland. He graduated from Columbia University, where he studied economics and literature.

He was working at National City Bank when he met Anaïs Nin. They married in March 1923. In 1924, they moved to Paris, and in that city Nin wrote the best-known part of her famous diary. In 1939, shortly before World War II, Parker and Nin moved back to New York City. In 1940, he took up engraving and etching, studying under Stanley William Hayter of Atelier 17 in Paris, producing surreal images that often accompanied Nin's books. He also received instruction in filmmaking from Alexander Hammid, who told Guiler: "Use the camera yourself, make your own mistakes, make your own style". He used the name Ian Hugo in the 1940s when he began making experimental films, some starring Nin.

His successful banking career supported the artistic work of not only his wife but also her lover, Henry Miller, and to a lesser extent various others. Hugo's unusual tolerance and unconditional love, as well as his income, made Anaïs's work and life possible for many years. Then during the couple's old age, this economic relationship flipped. Starting in 1966, when the first of Anaïs's diaries was published, her late-life literary success provided crucial financial support for them both. None of Guiler's artistic endeavors were ever financially successful.

His film Bells of Atlantis (1952) features a soundtrack of electronic music by Louis and Bebe Barron, and stars Nin as a mythical queen of Atlantis. In Jazz of Lights (1954), also featuring a score by the Barrons, the street lights of Times Square become, in Nin's words, "an ephemeral flow of sensations".

Hugo lived the last two decades of his life in New York City, dictating his memoirs and continuing his engraving and filmmaking work. He briefly met Nin's other husband, Rupert Pole (Nin was a bigamist), after Nin's death in 1977. Even though Nin and Pole's 1955 marriage was annulled in 1966, Pole was Nin's literary executor after her death; after Guiler's death, Pole scattered his ashes at the same place as Nin's, a cove on the coast at Santa Monica.

== Selected filmography (as Ian Hugo) ==
- Ai-Ye (1950)
- Bells of Atlantis (1952)
- Jazz of Lights (1954)
- Melodic Inversion (1958)
- The Gondola Eye (1963–71)
- Through the Magiscope (1969)
- Apertura (1970)
- Aphrodisiac I (1971)
- Aphrodisiac II (1972)
- Ian Hugo: Engraver and Filmmaker (1972)
- Levitation (1972)
- Transmigration (1973)
- Transcending (1974)
- Luminiscence (1977) made with Arnold S. Eagle
- Reborn (1979)
