= 1958 in the United Kingdom =

Events from the year 1958 in the United Kingdom.

== Incumbents ==
- Monarch – Elizabeth II
- Prime Minister – Harold Macmillan (Conservative)

== Events ==
- 6 January – Chancellor of the Exchequer Peter Thorneycroft together with junior Treasury Ministers Enoch Powell and Nigel Birch resign over Cabinet opposition to spending cuts, an event dismissed to the Press the following day by the Prime Minister as "little local difficulties".
- 14 January – TWW, the ITV franchise for South Wales and the West of England goes on the air.
- 6 February – The Manchester United F.C. team plane flying back from a European Cup tie in Belgrade crashes on take-off after refuelling at Munich Airport in West Germany. 21 of the 44 people on board are killed. Seven of them are Manchester United players: captain and left-back Roger Byrne (aged 28), centre-half Mark Jones (aged 24), right-half Eddie Colman (aged 21), centre-forward Tommy Taylor (aged 26), full-back Geoff Bent (aged 25), left-winger David Pegg (aged 22), and inside-forward Billy Whelan (aged 22). Eight of the nine sports journalists travelling on the plane are also killed, including the former Manchester City and England national football team goalkeeper Frank Swift. Among the survivors are 10 United players and manager Matt Busby, who is reported to be seriously injured. Outside-right Johnny Berry and left-half Duncan Edwards are also reported to be in a serious condition.
- 20 February – The government announces plans to close the 300-year-old naval dockyards at Sheerness on the Isle of Sheppey which would result in more than 2,500 workers losing their jobs.
- 21 February – Duncan Edwards dies of his injuries in a Munich hospital fifteen days after the Munich air crash. Edwards, twenty-one years old and rated by many as the finest player in England, is the eighth Manchester United player to die.
- 25 February – Bertrand Russell launches the Campaign for Nuclear Disarmament, initiated at a meeting called by Canon John Collins on 15 January. The campaign peace symbol has been launched on 21 February by Gerald Holtom.
- 27 February – The final death toll of the Munich air disaster reaches 23 with the death of co-pilot Kenneth Rayment in hospital.
- 28 February – The Victorian Society, the pressure group for Victorian architecture, holds its first meeting.
- March – Removal of Derbyshire county administrative headquarters from Derby to Matlock begins.
- 2 March – The British Commonwealth Trans-Antarctic Expedition led by Sir Vivian Fuchs completes the first crossing of the Antarctic using Sno-Cat caterpillar tractors and dogsled teams in 99 days.
- 19 March – The official opening by Prince Philip, Duke of Edinburgh of the London Planetarium, the first of its kind in Britain. Public presentations commence on 20 March.
- 24 March – Work on the M1, Britain's first full-length motorway, begins. The first stretch of the motorway, due to open next year, will run from London to the Warwickshire-Northamptonshire border. During the 1960s, the remainder of the motorway will be built to give London an unbroken motorway link with Leeds some 200 miles away.
- 29 March – Mary Elizabeth Wilson of Windy Nook in County Durham is convicted as a serial mariticide.
- 1 April – The BBC Radiophonic Workshop is created.
- 4–7 April – The first protest march for the Campaign for Nuclear Disarmament from Trafalgar Square to the Atomic Weapons Research Establishment at Aldermaston, Berkshire, demanding a ban on nuclear weapons.
- 7 April – The Church of England gives its moral backing to family planning.
- 27 April – British Overseas Airways Corporation (BOAC)'s first de Havilland Comet 4 makes its maiden flight.
- 30 April
  - The Life Peerages Act receives Royal Assent, the Act allows the creation of life peers who can sit in the House of Lords. As life peerages could be bestowed on women, this Act allows them to sit in the House of Lords for the first time.
  - The musical My Fair Lady, starring Rex Harrison and Julie Andrews, opens in London's Drury Lane theatre.
- 3 May – Bolton Wanderers win the FA Cup for the fourth time in their history with a 2–0 win over Manchester United (depleted by the Munich air disaster) at Wembley Stadium. Both goals are scored by centre-forward Nat Lofthouse.
- 15 May – Hilda Harding is announced as Britain's first female bank manager, at Barclays, Hanover Street, London (opening December).
- 21 May – United Kingdom Postmaster General Ernest Marples announces that from December, Subscriber Trunk Dialling will be introduced in the Bristol area.
- 27 May – 19-year-old Shelagh Delaney's "kitchen sink drama" A Taste of Honey is staged by Joan Littlewood's Theatre Workshop at the Theatre Royal Stratford East.
- May – Nuclear development: Dounreay materials test reactor in Scotland achieves criticality.
- 4 June – The Duke of Edinburgh's Award is presented for the first time at Buckingham Palace.
- 7 June – Ian Donald publishes an article in The Lancet which describes the diagnostic use of ultrasound in obstetrics as pioneered in Glasgow.
- 9 June – The Queen officially reopens Gatwick Airport which has been expanded at a cost of more than £7,000,000.
- 18 June – Benjamin Britten's one-act children's opera Noye's Fludde premieres at the Aldeburgh Festival.
- 3 July
  - The US–UK Mutual Defence Agreement, chiefly concerning co-operation over nuclear weapons, is signed in Washington, D.C.
  - The last débutante is formally presented to the Queen, at Holyroodhouse in Edinburgh.
- 10 July – The UK's first parking meters are installed in the City of Westminster.
- 17 July – British paratroopers arrive in Jordan: King Hussein has asked for help against pressure from Iraq.
- 18–26 July – The British Empire and Commonwealth Games are held in Cardiff.
- 26 July
  - The Queen gives her son Charles (the later King Charles III) the heir apparent's customary title of Prince of Wales, announcing this at the Cardiff games.
  - Abolition of the presentation of débutantes to the royal court.
- 1 August
  - Blind politician Ian Fraser, Baron Fraser of Lonsdale, becomes the first life peer to obtain his letters patent.
  - Carry on Sergeant, the first Carry On film, is released.
- 8 August – Sociologist Barbara Wootton, Baroness Wootton of Abinger, becomes the first female peer in her own right to obtain letters patent.
- 28 August – The first Miss United Kingdom beauty pageant is held on Blackpool beach; Eileen Sheridan of Walton-on-Thames is the winner.
- 29 August
  - Project Emily: The first United States Thor missile is delivered to the UK, for operation by No. 77 Squadron RAF at RAF Feltwell.
  - Cliff Richard's debut single Move It is released, reaching #2 in the chart. It is credited with being one of the first authentic rock and roll songs produced outside the United States.
- 30 August
  - Notting Hill race riots in London.
  - Southern Television, the ITV franchise for the South of England goes on the air.
- 1 September – The first Cod War between the UK and Iceland breaks out.
- 5 September – A severe storm over the South-East of England seriously disrupts communications.
- 16 September – Relaxation of restrictions on hire purchase.
- 20 September – 1958 Syerston Avro Vulcan crash: During a high-speed flyby in an air show at RAF Syerston, Nottinghamshire, prototype Avro Vulcan bomber VX770 suffers total collapse of the starboard wing and crashes, killing all four crew and three people on the ground.
- 30 September – Britain's last flying boat is withdrawn from commercial service when Aquila Airways terminates its service on the Southampton–Funchal (Madeira) route, on which it has been using Short Solent planes.
- 1 October – The UK transfers sovereignty of Christmas Island from Singapore to Australia.
- 4 October – BOAC de Havilland Comet 4 G-APDB makes the first commercial transatlantic flight by a jet airliner, from London Heathrow Airport to New York International Airport, Anderson Field via Gander.
- 11 October – First broadcast of the long-running BBC Television sports programme Grandstand. It would run until 2007.
- 16 October – First broadcast of the long-running BBC Television children's programme Blue Peter.
- 19 October – By finishing second in the Moroccan Grand Prix, Mike Hawthorn becomes the first British racing driver to win the Formula One World Championship.
- 21 October – The first life peers, including the first female peers, enter the House of Lords. The Baronesses Swanborough (Stella Isaacs, Marchioness of Reading) and Wootton (Barbara Wootton) are the first women to take their seats as life peers, and Lord Parker of Waddington, the Lord Chief Justice of England, the first man to do so.
- 25 October – The Short SC.1 experimental VTOL aircraft makes its first free vertical flight.
- 28 October – The State Opening of Parliament is broadcast on television for the first time.
- 10 November – Donald Campbell sets the world water speed record at 248.62 mph (400.12 km/h) on Coniston Water.
- 24 November – An exhibition of computers held at Earl's Court, London, the first of its kind in the world.
- 25 November – The Austin FX4 London taxi goes on sale, it will remain in production until 1997.
- 30 November – During the live broadcast of the Armchair Theatre play Underground on the ITV network, actor Gareth Jones has a fatal heart attack between scenes.
- 5 December
  - The Preston Bypass, the UK's first motorway, is opened by Prime Minister Harold Macmillan.
  - Subscriber Trunk Dialling (STD) is inaugurated by The Queen when she dials a call from Bristol to Edinburgh and speaks to Lord Provost.
  - The first service by a Royal National Lifeboat Institution Oakley-class self-righting lifeboat, RNLB J.G. Graves of Sheffield (ON 942) at Scarborough.
- 10 December – English biochemist Frederick Sanger wins his first Nobel Prize in Chemistry "for his work on the structure of proteins, especially that of insulin" (his second comes in 1980).
- 24 December – 1958 Bristol Britannia 312 crash: a BOAC Bristol Britannia airliner crashes near Winkton in Hampshire on a routine test flight.
- 25 December – Christmas Day is a public holiday in Scotland for the first time.

=== Undated ===
- The first boutique, His Clothes, is opened in Carnaby Street, London, by John Stephen.
- British Nylon Spinners introduce the name Bri-Nylon.
- The first Little Chef diner is opened in Reading, Berkshire, by Sam Alper.
- German-born British mathematician Klaus Roth wins the Fields Medal for his work on the Thue–Siegel–Roth theorem.
- The British Rally Championship in motorsport begins its first year.

== Publications ==
- H. E. Bates' novel The Darling Buds of May, first in the Larkin family series.
- John Betjeman's Collected Poems.
- Michael Bond's children's story A Bear Called Paddington, introducing the character Paddington Bear (13 October).
- Agatha Christie's crime novel Ordeal by Innocence.
- Lawrence Durrell's novels Balthazar and Mountolive from The Alexandria Quartet.
- Ian Fleming's James Bond novel Dr. No.
- Graham Greene's black comedy novel Our Man in Havana.
- Dr D. G. Hessayon's guide Be Your Own Gardening Expert, first in the best selling gardening book series in history.
- Iris Murdoch's novel The Bell.
- Alan Sillitoe's first novel Saturday Night and Sunday Morning.
- T. H. White's Arthurian novel The Once and Future King (combined edition).
- Raymond Williams' study Culture and Society.
- Michael Young's satirical essay The Rise of the Meritocracy.
- Bunty girls' comic first published (18 January).

== Births ==
- 2 January – Helen Goodman, English lawyer and politician
- 4 January – Julian Sands, English actor (died 2023)
- 9 January
  - Steve Gibson, English businessman
  - Stephen Neale, English philosopher and academic
- 10 January – Caroline Langrishe, English actress
- 12 January – Christiane Amanpour, journalist
- 24 January – Jools Holland, British musician
- 27 January – Alan Milburn, British Labour politician and MP for Darlington
- 29 January – Linda Smith, comedian (died 2006)
- 1 February – Eleanor Laing, British Conservative politician, MP for Epping Forest, and Shadow Minister for Women
- 6 February – Tim Dakin, English bishop and missionary
- 7 February – Matt Ridley, English science writer
- 10 February – Billy Thomson, Scottish footballer (d. 2023)
- 11 February – Michael Jackson, British broadcast executive
- 12 February – Steve Grand, English computer scientist
- 17 February – Steve Fox, footballer and gardener (died 2012)
- 19 February
  - Helen Fielding, novelist and screenwriter
  - Steve Nieve, musician
- 20 February – James Wilby, actor
- 26 February – Paul Ackford, rugby player
- 28 February – Ian Burnett, Lord Chief Justice
- 1 March – Nik Kershaw, English pop singer-songwriter
- 3 March – Miranda Richardson, English actress
- 5 March – Andy Gibb, English-born pop singer-songwriter (died 1988)
- 7 March – Rik Mayall, comedian
- 8 March
  - Andy McDonald, politician
  - Gary Numan, English new wave singer
- 10 March – Garth Crooks, English football player and pundit
- 13 March
  - Caryl Phillips, Saint Kitts-born writer
  - Linda Robson, actress
- 16 March – Chris Mole, British Labour politician and MP for Ipswich
- 18 March – Neil Brand, British writer and composer
- 21 March
  - Richard Murphy, English tax campaigner
  - Gary Oldman, English actor
- 29 March – Fiona Reynolds, civil servant and academic administrator
- 6 April
  - Graeme Base, English-born Australian children's illustrator and author
  - Jackie Gallagher, English footballer
- 9 April – Nadey Hakim, British-Lebanese surgeon and sculptor
- 11 April – Stuart Adamson, Scottish rock singer and guitarist (Big Country) (d. 2001)
- 12 April – Will Sergeant, English rock guitarist (Echo & the Bunnymen)
- 14 April – Peter Capaldi, Scottish actor and director
- 15 April
  - Abu Hamza al-Masri, Egyptian-born Muslim cleric convicted of inciting racial hatred and murder
  - Sir Robert Smith, 3rd Baronet, British Liberal Democrat politician and MP for West Aberdeenshire and Kincardine
  - Benjamin Zephaniah, Black British poet and musician (died 2023)
- 18 April – Saviour Pirotta, British/Maltese children's author
- 22 April – Nick Danziger, British photo journalist
- 24 April – Brian Paddick, Baron Paddick, British police commander
- 25 April – Fish, Scottish rock singer
- 3 May – Sandi Toksvig, Danish-born comedian, author and broadcast presenter
- 4 May
  - Caroline Spelman, British Conservative politician, MP for Meriden, Shadow Secretary of State for Local and Devolved Government Affairs
  - Jane Kennedy, British Labour politician, MP for Liverpool Wavertree
- 8 May – Brooks Newmark, American-English businessman and politician, Lord of the Treasury
- 18 May – Toyah Willcox, actress and singer
- 20 May – Paul Whitehouse, Welsh comedian and actor
- 22 May – Denise Welch, English actress
- 25 May – Paul Weller, English singer-songwriter (The Jam, The Style Council)
- 26 May – Howard Goodall, English composer
- 3 June – Simon Fraser, diplomat
- 5 June – Graeme Crallan, heavy metal drummer (died 2008)
- 6 June – Paul Burrell, butler to Princess Diana
- 7 June – Ivan Henderson, British Labour politician and MP for Harwich
- 11 June – Barry Adamson, English singer and bass player
- 14 June – Nick Van Eede, pop rock singer-songwriter, frontman for Cutting Crew
- 18 June – Gary Martin, voice actor and actor
- 23 June – John Henry Hayes, British Conservative politician, MP for South Holland and The Deepings, and Chairman of the Cornerstone Group
- 29 June – Peter Scudamore, National Hunt jockey
- 30 June – Pam Royle, British television presenter, journalist and voice coach
- July – Huw Dixon, Welsh economist
- 1 July – Les Morton, English racewalker
- 4 July – Carl Valentine, footballer in Canada
- 5 July – Paul Daniel, English conductor
- 6 July – Jennifer Saunders, comedy actress
- 9 July – Robin Kermode, English actor, author and communications coach
- 11 July – Mark Lester, child actor
- 15 July - Monica Grady, space scientist
- 17 July
  - Suzanne Moore, English journalist
  - Nick Newman, English satirical cartoonist and scriptwriter
- 24 July – Joe McGann, English actor
- 27 July
  - Christopher Dean, ice dancer, Olympic gold medallist
  - Vincenzo Nicoli, actor
- 30 July
  - Kate Bush, art pop singer-songwriter
  - Daley Thompson, decathlete, Olympic gold medallist
- 1 August – Adrian Dunbar, actor, director and singer
- 3 August – Lindsey Hilsum, journalist
- 7 August – Bruce Dickinson, English heavy metal singer
- 10 August – Rosie Winterton, British Labour politician, MP for Doncaster Central and member of the Privy Council
- 13 August – Feargal Sharkey, Northern Irish punk rock lead singer of The Undertones
- 14 August – Philip Dunne, Conservative politician and MP for Ludlow
- 19 August – Gordon Brand Jnr, Scottish professional golfer (died 2019)
- 20 August – Nicholas Bell, English actor based in Australia
- 29 August – Lenny Henry, entertainer
- 30 August – Muriel Gray, Scottish author, broadcaster and journalist
- 31 August – Stephen Cottrell, English Anglican bishop
- 13 September – Bobby Davro, actor, comedian and impressionist
- 18 September – Linda Lusardi, model, actress and television presenter
- 21 September – Simon Mayo, radio presenter
- 23 September – Danielle Dax, British experimental musician
- 27 September – Irvine Welsh, Scottish novelist
- 1 October – Martin Cooper, musician (OMD)
- 4 October – Anneka Rice, Welsh-born television presenter
- 14 October – Thomas Dolby, English musician
- 17 October – Craig Murray, UK Ambassador to Uzbekistan
- 20 October
  - Dave Finlay, Northern Irish professional wrestler
  - Mark King, English jazz-funk singer and slap-style bass guitarist (Level 42)
- 25 October – Phil Daniels, English actor
- 26 October – Shaun Woodward, British Labour politician and MP for St Helens South
- 27 October – Simon Le Bon, English new wave singer-songwriter (Duran Duran)
- 29 October – Cherry Vann, archbishop
- 1 November – Mark Austin, English newsreader (ITN)
- 2 November – Mark Phillip Hendrick, British Labour Co-operative politician and MP for Preston
- 6 November – Cath Kidston, English fashion designer and businesswoman
- 19 November – Isabella Blow, British fashion journalist (died 2007)
- 22 November – Bruce Payne, English actor and producer
- 24 November
  - Gregory Doran, theatre director
  - Nick Knight, photographer
- 25 November – Kim Ashfield, model
- 1 December – Keith Chapman, English children's television programme creator
- 2 December – Andrew George, British Liberal Democrat politician and MP for St Ives
- 5 December – Dynamite Kid, English professional wrestler (died 2018)
- 6 December – Nick Park, filmmaker and animator
- 7 December – Tim Butler, musician (The Psychedelic Furs)
- 14 December
  - Mike Scott, Scottish folk rock singer-songwriter (The Waterboys)
  - Spider Stacy, English Celtic punk tin whistle player and singer-songwriter (The Pogues)
- 18 December
  - Joseph Comerford, hydraulic engineer (died 2000)
  - Geordie Walker, rock guitarist (Killing Joke) (died 2023)
- 19 December
  - Steven Isserlis, English cellist
  - Limahl, English pop singer
- 21 December – Kevin Blackwell, English football manager

=== Unknown date ===
- Adrian Bradshaw, army commander
- Omar Bakri Muhammad, Syrian-born Muslim cleric

== Deaths ==
- 4 January – John Anderson, 1st Viscount Waverley, civil servant and politician (born 1882)
- 16 January – Aubrey Mather, actor (born 1885)
- 6 February – Manchester United F.C. players and associates in Munich air disaster:
  - Roger Byrne, team captain (born 1929)
  - Geoff Bent (born 1932)
  - Eddie Colman (born 1936)
  - Mark Jones (born 1933)
  - David Pegg (born 1935)
  - Tommy Taylor (born 1932)
  - Billy Whelan (born 1935)
  - Frank Swift (born 1913), journalist and former Manchester City F.C. and England goalkeeper
- 7 February – Walter Kingsford, actor (born 1882)
- 11 February – Ernest Jones, Welsh psychoanalyst (born 1879)
- 13 February – Christabel Pankhurst, English suffragette (born 1880)
- 21 February – Duncan Edwards, Manchester United footballer, died in Munich air disaster (born 1936)
- 26 March – Phil Mead, English cricketer (born 1887)
- 16 April – Rosalind Franklin, British crystallographer (born 1920)
- 19 April – Billy Meredith, Welsh footballer (born 1874)
- 3 May – Frank Foster, English cricketer (born 1889)
- 19 May – Ronald Colman, English actor (born 1891)
- 22 May – Sir Richmond Palmer, lawyer and colonial administrator (born 1877)
- 9 June – Robert Donat, English film and stage actor (born 1905)
- 13 June – Edwin Keppel Bennett, British writer (born 1887)
- 28 June – Alfred Noyes, English poet (born 1880)
- 15 July – Julia Lennon, mother of John Lennon (born 1914)
- 20 July – Margaret Haig Thomas, 2nd Viscountess Rhondda, political campaigner and businesswoman (born 1883)
- 3 August – Peter Collins, British Formula 1 driver, died in German Grand Prix (born 1931)
- 26 August – Ralph Vaughan Williams, British composer (born 1872)
- 3 September – Sir Giffard Le Quesne Martel, British army general (born 1889)
- 23 September – Alfred Piccaver, British-born American operatic tenor (born 1884)
- 25 September – Henry Arthur Evans, Welsh Conservative politician (born 1898)
- 2 October – Marie Stopes, birth control advocate, suffragette and palaeontologist (born 1880)
- 17 October – Charlie Townsend, English cricketer (born 1876)
- 24 October – G. E. Moore, philosopher, author of Principia Ethica (born 1873)
- 28 October – Stephen Butterworth, physicist and engineer (born 1885)
- 30 October – Rose Macaulay, novelist (born 1881)
- 24 November – Lord Robert Cecil, English politician and diplomat, recipient of the Nobel Peace Prize (born 1864)
- 30 November – Gareth Jones, Welsh-born television actor (born 1925)
- 2 December – Alan McKibbin, Northern Irish politician (born 1892)
- 5 December – Willie Applegarth, Olympic sprinter, died in United States (born 1890)

== See also ==
- 1958 in British music
- 1958 in British television
- List of British films of 1958
