= Constantine P. Cavafy =

Greek poet and journalist (1863–1933)

- Κωνσταντίνος Καβάφης
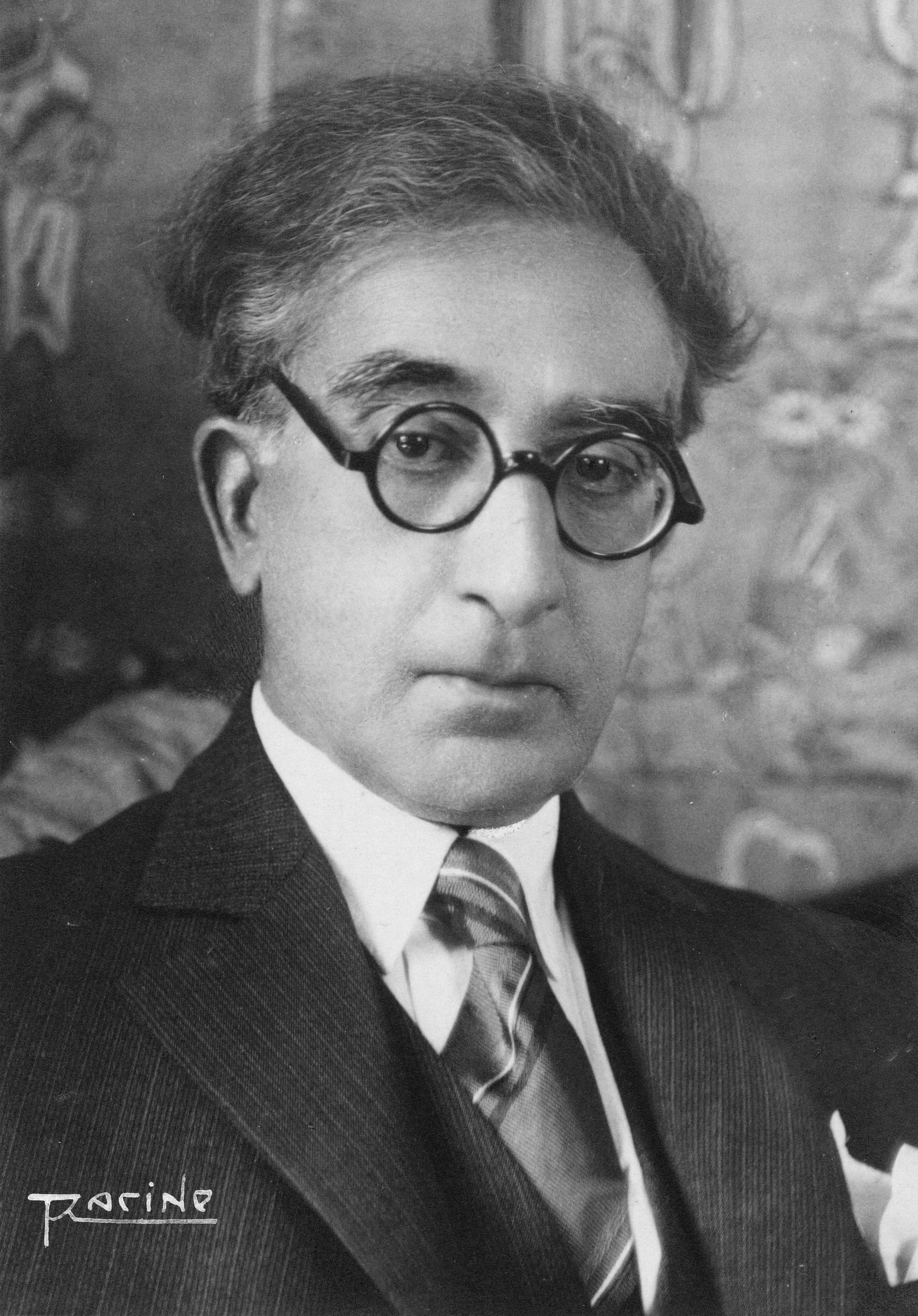
- Constantine Cavafy in 1929
- Born: 29 April 1863; Alexandria, Egypt Eyalet
- Died: 29 April 1933 (aged 70); Alexandria, Kingdom of Egypt
- Resting place: Greek Orthodox Cemetery, Alexandria, Egypt
- Occupations: Poet, journalist, civil servant
- Writing career
- Notable awards: Silver medal of the Order of the Phoenix

Konstantinos Petrou Kavafis (Greek: Κωνσταντίνος Πέτρου Καβάφης [ka'vafis]; 29 April (OS 17 April), 1863 – 29 April 1933), known, especially in English, as Constantine P. Cavafy and often published as C. P. Cavafy (/kɑːˈvɑːfi/), was a Greek poet, journalist, and civil servant from Alexandria. A major figure of modern Greek literature, he is sometimes considered the most distinguished Greek poet of the 20th century. His works and consciously individual style earned him a place among the most important contributors not only to Greek poetry, but to Western poetry as a whole.

Cavafy's poetic canon consists of 154 poems, with dozens more that remained incomplete or in sketch form were not published until much later. He consistently refused to publish his work in books, preferring to share it through local newspapers and magazines, or even print it himself on broadsheets and give it away to anyone who might be interested. His most important poems were written after his fortieth birthday and published two years after his death.

Cavafy's work has been translated numerous times into many languages. His friend E. M. Forster, the novelist and literary critic, first introduced his poems to the English-speaking world in 1923; he referred to him as "The Poet", famously describing him as "a Greek gentleman in a straw hat, standing absolutely motionless at a slight angle to the universe". His work, as one translator put it, "holds the historical and the erotic in a single embrace".

== Biography ==
Cavafy was born in 1863 in Alexandria (then Ottoman Egypt) where his Greek parents had settled in 1855; he was baptized into the Greek Orthodox Church and had six older brothers. (Note: Two more elder siblings, a sister and a brother, had died in infancy.) Originating from the Phanariot Greek community of Constantinople (now Istanbul), his father was named Petros Ioannis (Πέτρος Ἰωάννης)—hence the Petrou patronymic (GEN) in his name—and his mother Charicleia (Χαρίκλεια; née Georgaki Photiades, Γεωργάκη Φωτιάδη). His father was a prosperous merchant who had lived in England in earlier years and held both Greek and British citizenship. Two years after his father's sudden death in 1870, Cavafy and his family settled for a while in England, moving between Liverpool and London. In 1876, the family faced financial problems due to the Long Depression of 1873 and with their business now dissolved they moved back to Alexandria in 1877. Cavafy attended the Greek college "Hermes", where he made his first close friends and at the age of eighteen started drafting his own historical dictionary. (Note: The dictionary was compiled with the help of books that Cavafy borrowed from public libraries; it remained incomplete, stopping at the word "Alexandros".)

In 1882, disturbances in Alexandria caused the family to move, though again temporarily, to Constantinople, where they stayed at the house of his maternal grandfather, Georgakis Photiades. In that year a revolt broke out in Alexandria against the Anglo-French control of Egypt, precipitating the 1882 Anglo-Egyptian War. During these events, Alexandria was bombarded, and the family apartment at Ramleh was burned. Upon his arrival in Constantinople, the nineteen-year old Cavafy first came in contact with his many relatives and started researching his ancestry, trying to define himself in the wider Hellenic context. There he started preparing for a career in journalism and politics, and began his first systematic attempts to write poetry.

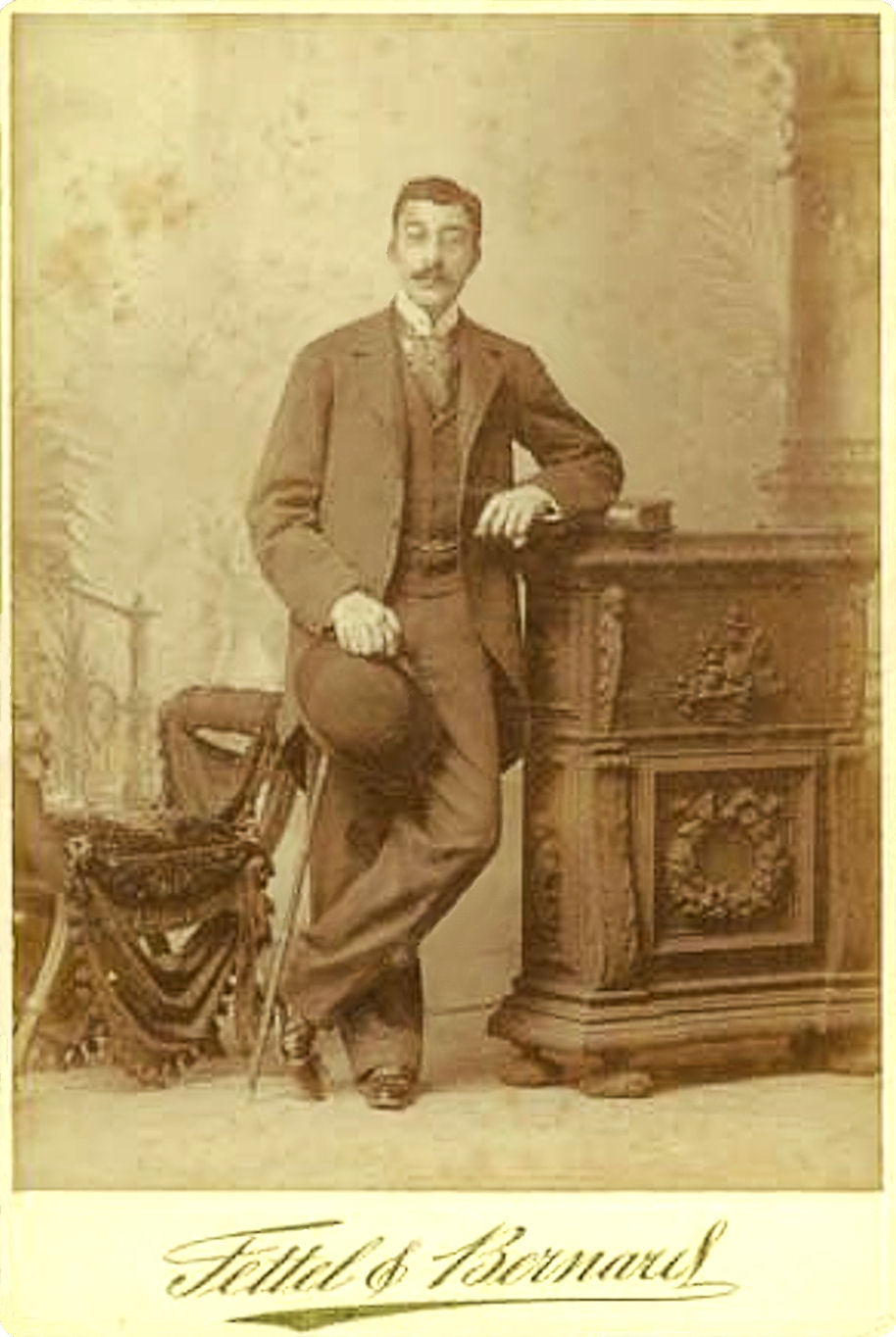
Cavafy in 1896

In 1885, Cavafy returned to Alexandria, where he lived for the rest of his life, leaving it only for excursions and travels abroad. After his arrival, he reacquired his Greek citizenship and abandoned the British citizenship his father had acquired in the late 1840s. He started working as a news correspondent at the journal Telegraphos (1886) and later worked at the stock exchange. He was eventually hired as a temporary, due to his foreign citizenship, clerk in the British-run Egyptian Ministry of Public Works. A conscientious worker, Cavafy held this position by renewing it annually for thirty years (Egypt remained a British protectorate until 1926). During these decades, a series of unexpected deaths of close friends and relatives left their mark on him. He published his poetry from 1891 to 1904 in the form of broadsheets, and only for his close friends. Any acclaim he received came mainly from within the Greek community of Alexandria. In 1903, he was introduced to mainland-Greek literary circles through a favourable review by Gregorios Xenopoulos. He received little recognition because his style differed markedly from mainstream Greek poetry of the period. Twenty years later, after the Greek defeat in the Greco-Turkish War (1919–1922), a new generation of almost nihilist poets (e.g. Karyotakis) found inspiration in Cavafy's work.

A biographical note written by Cavafy reads:

I am from Constantinople by descent, but I was born in Alexandria—at a house on Seriph Street; I left very young, and spent much of my childhood in England. Subsequently I visited this country as an adult, but for a short period of time. I have also lived in France. During my adolescence I lived over two years in Constantinople. It has been many years since I last visited Greece. My last employment was as a clerk at a government office under the Ministry of Public Works of Egypt. I know English, French, and a little Italian.

In 1922, Cavafy quit his high-ranking position at the department of Public Works, an act that he characterized as liberation, and devoted himself to the completion of his poetic work. In 1926, the Greek state honoured Cavafy for his contribution to Greek letters by awarding him the silver medal of the Order of Phoenix. He died of cancer of the larynx on 29 April 1933, his 70th birthday. Since his death, Cavafy's reputation has grown; his poetry is taught in school in Greece and Cyprus, and in universities around the world.

E. M. Forster knew him personally and wrote a memoir of him, contained in his book Alexandria. Forster, Arnold J. Toynbee, and T. S. Eliot were among the earliest promoters of Cavafy in the English-speaking world before the Second World War. In 1966, David Hockney made a series of prints to illustrate a selection of Cavafy's poems, including In the dull village.

== Work ==
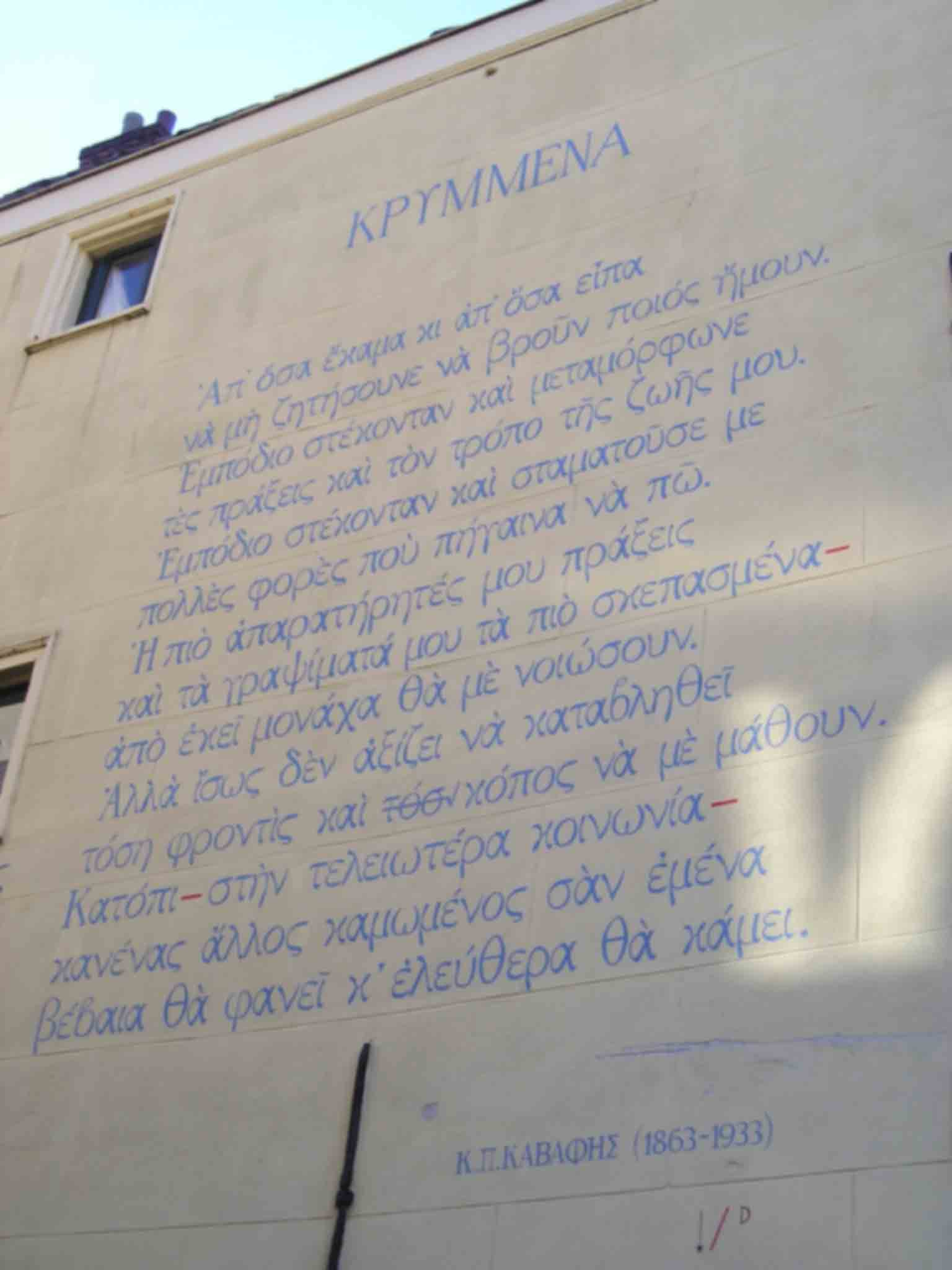
Cavafy's poem Hidden Things (Κρυμμένα) painted on a building in Leiden, Netherlands

Cavafy's complete literary corpus includes the 154 poems that constitute his poetic canon; his 75 unpublished or "hidden" poems, that were found completed in his archive or in the hands of friends, and weren't published until 1968; his 37 rejected poems, which he published but later renounced; his 30 incomplete poems that were found unfinished in his archive; as well as numerous other prose poems, essays, and letters. According to the poet's instructions, his poems are classified into three categories: historical, philosophical, and hedonistic or sensual.

Cavafy was instrumental in the revival and recognition of Greek poetry both at home and abroad. His poems are, typically, concise but intimate evocations of real or literary figures and milieux that have played roles in Greek culture. Some of the defining themes are uncertainty about the future, sensual pleasures, the moral character and psychology of individuals, homosexuality, and a fatalistic existential nostalgia. Besides his subjects, unconventional for the time, his poems also exhibit a skilled and versatile craftsmanship, which is extremely difficult to translate. Cavafy was a perfectionist, obsessively refining every single line of his poetry. His mature style was a free iambic form, free in the sense that verses rarely rhyme and are usually from 10 to 17 syllables. In his poems, the presence of rhyme usually implies irony.

Cavafy drew his themes from personal experience, along with a deep and wide knowledge of history, especially of the Hellenistic era. Many of his poems are pseudo-historical, or seemingly historical, or accurately but quirkily historical.

One of Cavafy's most important works is his 1904 poem "Waiting for the Barbarians". The poem begins by describing a city-state in decline, whose population and legislators are waiting for the arrival of the barbarians. When night falls, the barbarians have not arrived. The poem ends: "What is to become of us without barbarians? Those people were a solution of a sort." The poem influenced literary works such as The Tartar Steppe by Dino Buzzati (1940), The Opposing Shore (1951) by Julien Gracq, and Waiting for the Barbarians (1980) by J. M. Coetzee.

In 1911, Cavafy wrote "Ithaca", often considered his best-known poem, inspired by the Homeric return journey (nostos) of Odysseus to his home island, as depicted in the Odyssey. The poem's theme is the destination which produces the journey of life: "Keep Ithaca always in your mind. / Arriving there is what you're destined for". The traveller should set out with hope, and at the end you may find Ithaca has no more riches to give you, but "Ithaca gave you the marvelous journey".

Almost all of Cavafy's work was in Greek; yet, his poetry remained unrecognized and underestimated in Greece, until after the publication of the first anthology in 1935 by Heracles Apostolidis (father of Renos Apostolidis). His unique style and language (which was a mixture of Katharevousa and Demotic Greek) had attracted the criticism of Kostis Palamas, the greatest poet of his era in mainland Greece, and his followers, who were in favour of the simplest form of Demotic Greek.

He is known for his prosaic use of metaphors, his brilliant use of historical imagery, and his aesthetic perfectionism. These attributes, amongst others, have assured him an enduring place in the literary pantheon of the Western World.

=== Historical poems ===
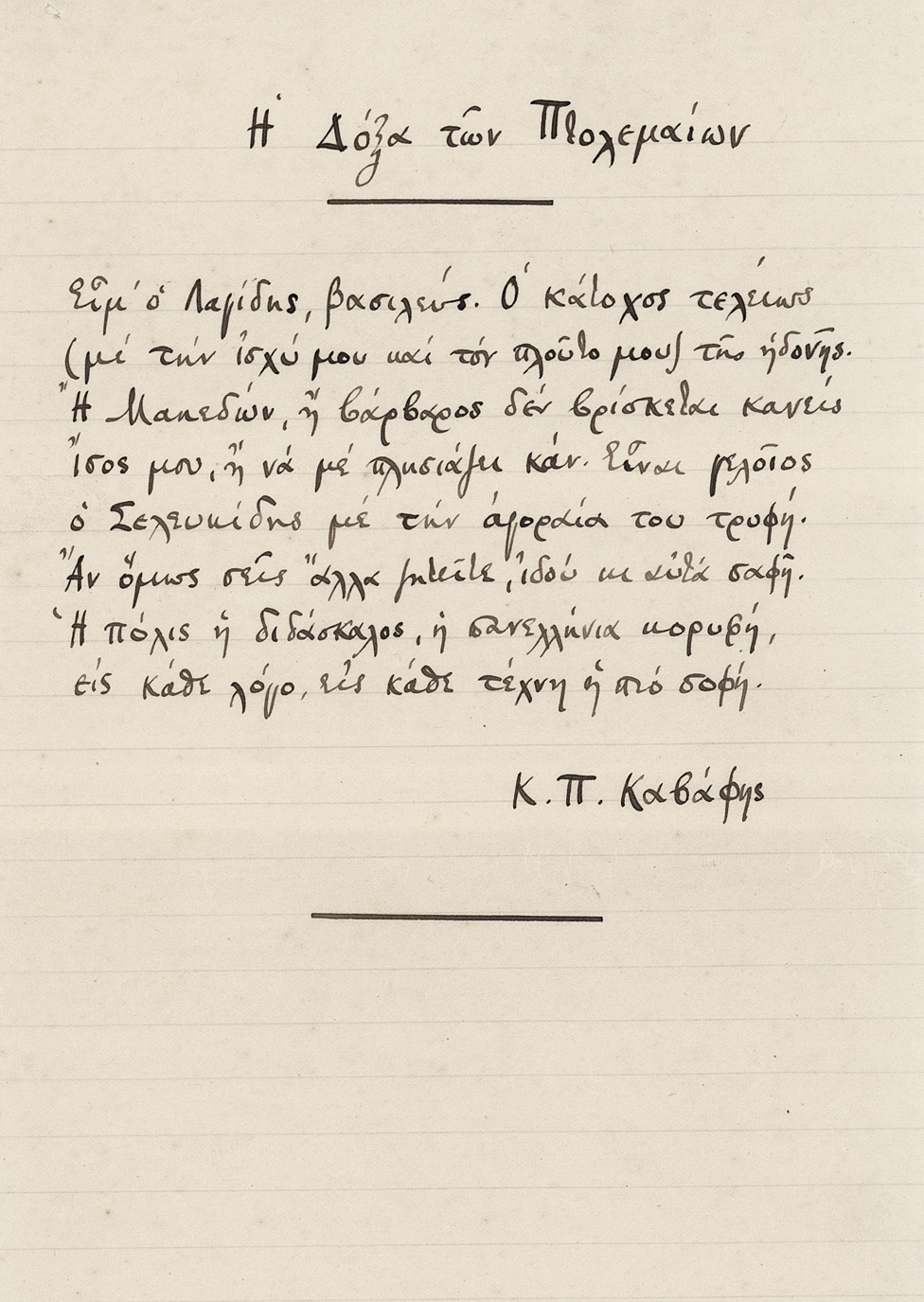
Manuscript of Cavafy's Ptolemaic glory (Η δόξα τῶν Πτολεμαίων).

Cavafy wrote over a dozen historical poems about famous historical figures and regular people. He was mainly inspired by the Hellenistic era with Alexandria at primary focus. Other poems originate from Helleno-Romanistic antiquity and the Byzantine era. Mythological references are also present. The periods chosen are mostly of decline and decadence (e.g. Trojans); his heroes facing the final end. His historical poems include: "The Glory of the Ptolemies", "In Sparta", "Come, O King of Lacedaemonians", "The First Step", "In the Year 200 B.C.", "If Only They Had Seen to It", "The Displeasure of Seleucid", "Theodotus", "Alexandrian Kings", "In Alexandria, 31 B.C.", "The God Forsakes Antony", "In a Township of Asia Minor", "Caesarion", "The Potentate from Western Libya", "Of the Hebrews (A.D. 50)", "Tomb of Eurion", "Tomb of Lanes", "Myres: Alexandrian A.D. 340", "Perilous Things", "From the School of the Renowned Philosopher", "A Priest of the Serapeum", "Kleitos' Illness", "If Dead Indeed", "In the Month of Athyr", "Tomb of Ignatius", "From Ammones Who Died Aged 29 in 610", "Aemilianus Monae", "Alexandrian, A.D. 628-655", "In Church", "Morning Sea" (a few poems about Alexandria were left unfinished at his death).

=== Homoerotic poems ===
Cavafy's sensual poems are filled with the lyricism and emotion of same-sex love, inspired by recollection and remembrance. The past and former actions, sometimes along with the vision for the future, underlie the muse of Cavafy in writing these poems. As poet George Kalogeris observes:

He is perhaps most popular today for his erotic verse, in which the Alexandrian youth[s] in his poems seem to have stepped right out of the Greek Anthology, and into a less accepting world that makes them vulnerable, and often keeps them in poverty, though the same Hellenic amber immures their beautiful bodies. The subjects of his poems often have a provocative glamour to them even in barest outline: the homoerotic one night stand that is remembered for a lifetime, the oracular pronouncement unheeded, the talented youth prone to self destruction, the offhand remark that indicates a crack in the imperial façade.

=== Philosophical poems ===
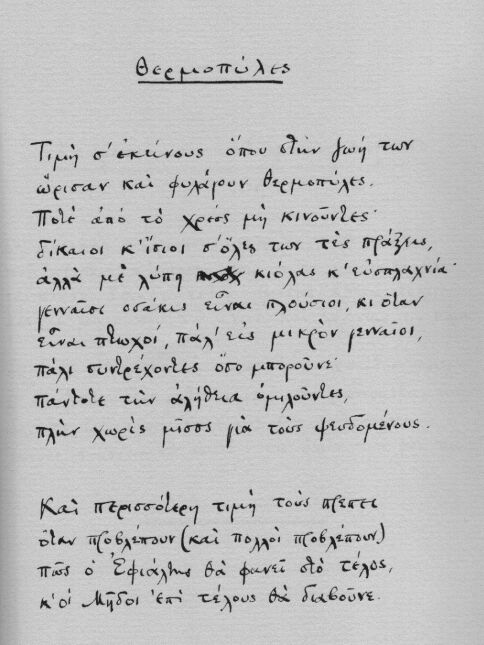
Manuscript of his poem Thermopylae (Θερμοπύλες).

Also called instructive poems, they are divided into poems with consultations to poets, and poems that deal with other situations such as isolation (for example, "The Walls"), duty (for example, "Thermopylae"), and human dignity (for example, "The God Abandons Antony").

The poem "Thermopylae" reminds us of the famous battle of Thermopylae where the 300 Spartans and their allies fought against the greater numbers of Persians, although they knew that they would be defeated. There are some principles in our lives that we should live by, and Thermopylae is the ground of duty. We stay there fighting although we know that there is the potential for failure. (At the end the traitor Ephialtes will appear, leading the Persians through the secret trail).

In another poem, "In the Year 200 B.C.", he comments on the historical epigram "Alexander, son of Philip, and the Greeks, except of Lacedaemonians,...", from the donation of Alexander to Athens after the Battle of the Granicus. Cavafy praises the Hellenistic era and idea, so condemning the closed-mind and localistic ideas about Hellenism. However, in other poems, his stance displays ambiguity between the Classical ideal and the Hellenistic era (which is sometimes described with a tone of decadence).

Another poem is the Epitaph of a Greek trader from Samos who was sold into slavery in India and dies on the shores of the Ganges: regretting the greed for riches which led him to sail so far away and end up "among utter barbarians", expressing his deep longing for his homeland and his wish to die as "In Hades I would be surrounded by Greeks".

== Museum ==
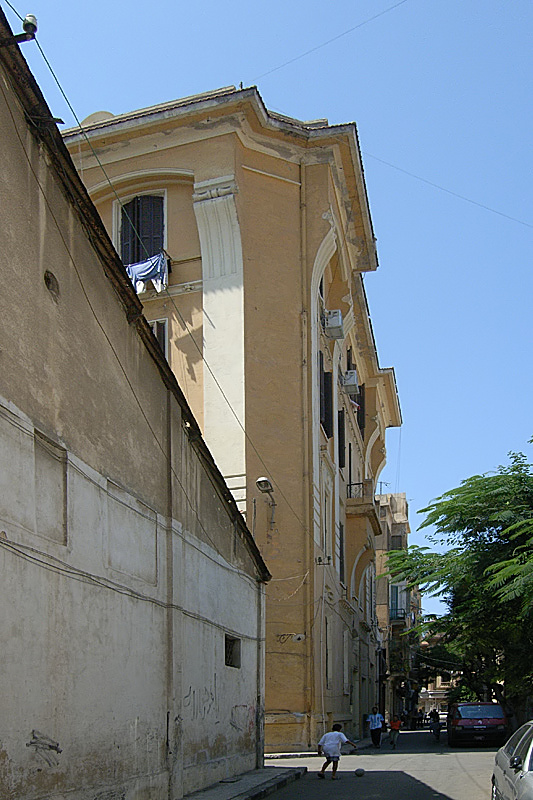
House-museum of Cavafy, Alexandria

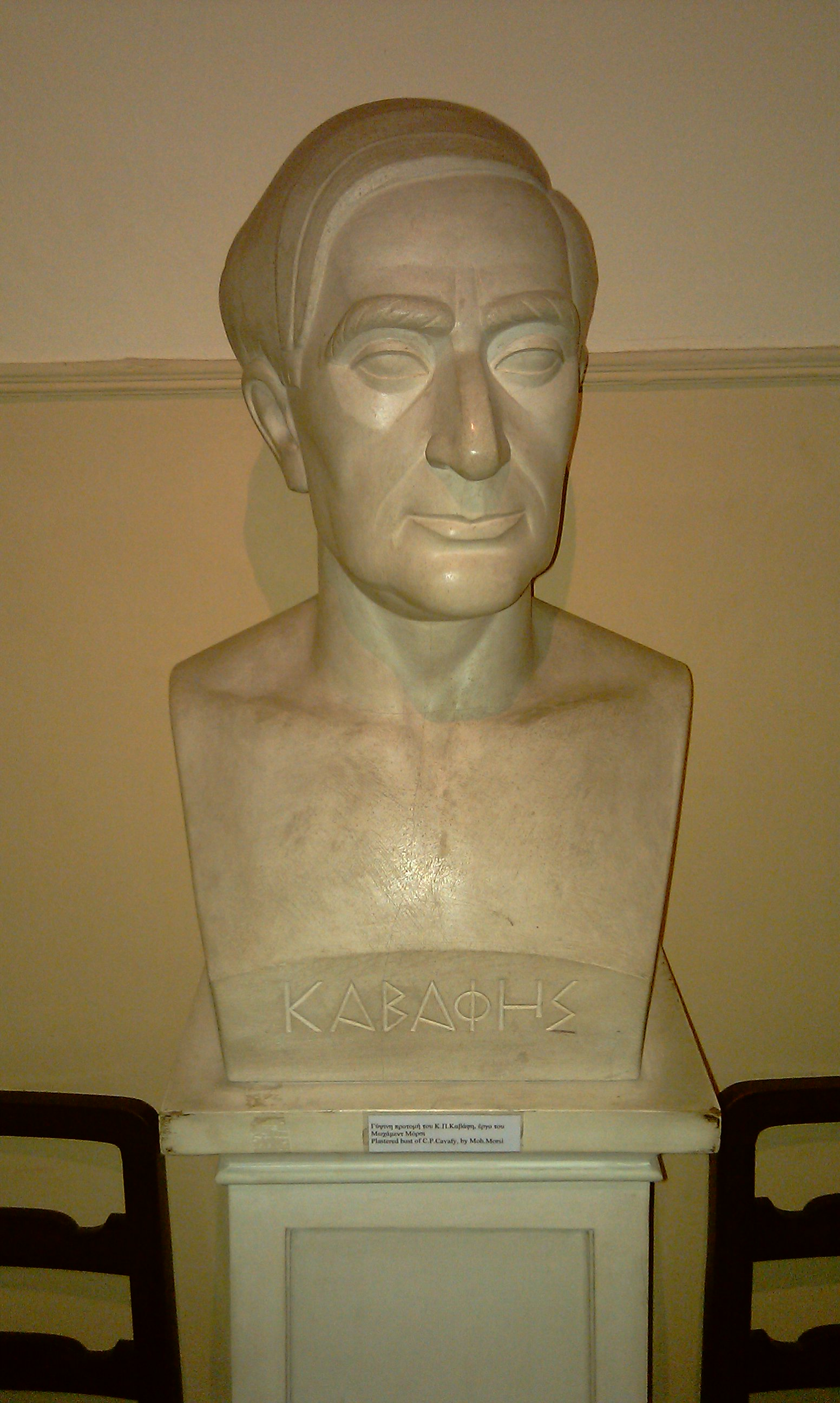
A bust of Cavafy located in his apartment

Cavafy's apartment in Alexandria is located on Lepsius street, which, after the apartment's conversion to a museum, was renamed to Cavafy street in honour of the poet. The museum was established in 1992 at the initiative of scholar Kostis Moskof, cultural attaché to the Greek Embassy in Cairo until 1998. After Cavafy's death in 1933, the apartment turned into a cheap hostel; it was later reconstructed with the help of photographs becoming reminiscent of Cavafy's time. The Cavafy Museum contains a wide range of bibliographical material; it is home to several of Cavafy's sketches and original manuscripts, as well as several pictures and portraits of and by Cavafy. It holds translations of Cavafy's poetry in 20 languages by 40 different scholars and most of the 3,000 articles and works written about his poetry.

== In popular culture ==
=== In film ===
- Scottish songwriter Donovan featured one of Cavafy's poems in his 1970 film There Is an Ocean.
- Cavafy, originally titled Kavafis, is a 1996 award-winning film directed by Yannis Smaragdis based on the life of the poet, starring Dimitris Katalifos and with music by Vangelis.
- Greek director Stelios Haralambopoulos's 2006 documentary The Night Fernando Pessoa Met Constantine Cavafy imagined Cavafy met with Portuguese poet Fernando Pessoa on a transatlantic ocean liner.

=== Literature ===
- C. P. Cavafy appears as a character in the Alexandria Quartet of Lawrence Durrell.
- The American poet Mark Doty's book My Alexandria uses the place and imagery of Cavafy to create a comparable contemporary landscape.
- The Nobel Prize–winning Turkish novelist Orhan Pamuk, in an extended essay published in The New York Times, writes about how Cavafy's poetry, particularly his poem "The City", has changed the way Pamuk looks at, and thinks about, the city of Istanbul, a city that remains central to Pamuk's own writing.
- Guy Gavriel Kay includes Cavafy's poem "Voices" in the Epigraph of his novel Written on the Dark.

=== Songs ===
- The Weddings Parties Anything song "The Afternoon Sun" is based on the Cavafy poem of the same title.
- The Canadian poet and singer-songwriter Leonard Cohen transformed Cavafy's poem "The God Abandons Antony", based on Mark Antony's loss of the city of Alexandria and his empire, into "Alexandra Leaving", a song around lost love.

=== Other references ===
- Frank H. T. Rhodes' last commencement speech given at Cornell University in 1995 was based on Cavafy's poem "Ithaca".

== Works ==
Selections of Cavafy's poems appeared only in pamphlets, privately printed booklets and broadsheets during his lifetime. The first publication in book form was "Ποιήματα" (Poiēmata, "Poems"), published posthumously in Alexandria, 1935.

Volumes with translations of Cavafy's poetry in English include:

- Poems by C. P. Cavafy, translated by John Mavrogordato (London: Chatto & Windus, 1978, first edition in 1951)
- The Complete Poems of Cavafy, translated by Rae Dalven, introduction by W. H. Auden (New York: Harcourt, Brace & World, 1961)
- The Greek Poems of C.P. Cavafy as Translated by Memas Kolaitis, two volumes (New York: Aristide D. Caratzas, Publisher, 1989)
- Complete Poems by C P Cavafy, translated by Daniel Mendelsohn, (Harper Press, 2013)
- Passions and Ancient Days - 21 New Poems, Selected and translated by Edmund Keeley and George Savidis (London: The Hogarth Press, 1972)
- Poems by Constantine Cavafy, translated by George Khairallah (Beirut: privately printed, 1979)
- C. P. Cavafy, Collected Poems, translated by Edmund Keeley and Philip Sherrard, edited by George Savidis, Revised edition (Princeton, NJ: Princeton University Press, 1992)
- Selected Poems of C. P. Cavafy, translated by Desmond O'Grady (Dublin: Dedalus, 1998)
- Before Time Could Change Them: The Complete Poems of Constantine P. Cavafy, translated by Theoharis C. Theoharis, foreword by Gore Vidal (New York: Harcourt, 2001)
- Poems by C. P. Cavafy, translated by J.C. Cavafy (Athens: Ikaros, 2003)
- I've Gazed So Much by C. P. Cavafy, translated by George Economou (London: Stop Press, 2003)
- C. P. Cavafy, The Canon, translated by Stratis Haviaras, foreword by Seamus Heaney (Athens: Hermes Publishing, 2004)
- The Collected Poems, translated by Evangelos Sachperoglou, edited by Anthony Hirst and with an introduction by Peter Mackridge (Oxford: Oxford University Press, ISBN 9608762707 2007)
- The Collected Poems of C. P. Cavafy: A New Translation, translated by Aliki Barnstone, Introduction by Gerald Stern (New York: W.W. Norton, 2007)
- C. P. Cavafy, Selected Poems, translated with an introduction by Avi Sharon (Harmondsworth: Penguin, 2008)
- Cavafy: 166 Poems, translated by Alan L Boegehold (Axios Press, ISBN 1604190051 2008)
- C. P. Cavafy, Collected Poems, translated by Daniel Mendelsohn (New York: Alfred A. Knopf, 2009)
- C. P. Cavafy, Poems: The Canon, translated by John Chioles, edited by Dimitrios Yatromanolakis (Cambridge, Massachusetts: Harvard Early Modern and Modern Greek Library, ISBN 9780674053267, 2011)
- "C.P. Cavafy, Selected Poems", translated by David Connolly, Aiora Press, Athens 2013
- Clearing the Ground: C.P. Cavafy, Poetry and Prose, 1902-1911, translations and essay by Martin McKinsey (Chapel Hill: Laertes, 2015)

Translations of Cavafy's poems are also included in:

- Lawrence Durrell, Justine (London, UK: Faber & Faber, 1957)
- Modern Greek Poetry, edited by Kimon Friar (New York: Simon and Schuster, 1973)
- Memas Kolaitis, Cavafy as I knew him (Santa Barbara, CA: Kolaitis Dictionaries, 1980)
- James Merrill, Collected Poems (New York: Alfred A. Knopf, 2002)
- David Ferry, Bewilderment (Chicago: University of Chicago Press, 2012)
- Don Paterson, Landing Light (London, UK: Faber & Faber, 2003)
- Derek Mahon, Adaptations (Loughcrew, Ireland: The Gallery Press, 2006)
- A.E. Stallings, Hapax (Evanston, Illinois: Triquarterly Books, 2006)
- Don Paterson, Rain (London, UK: Faber & Faber, 2009)
- John Ash, In the Wake of the Day (Manchester, UK: Carcanet Press, 2010)
- David Harsent, Night (London, UK: Faber & Faber, 2011)
- Selected Prose Works, C.P. Cavafy, edited and translated by Peter Jeffreys (Ann Arbor: University of Michigan Press, 2010)
