= Justine (1969 film) =

1969 film

- Theatrical release poster
- Directed by: George Cukor; Joseph Strick
- Written by: Lawrence B. Marcus; Lawrence Durrell (novel)
- Produced by: Pandro S. Berman
- Starring: Anouk Aimée; Dirk Bogarde; Robert Forster; Anna Karina; Philippe Noiret; Michael York; John Vernon; Jack Albertson; George Baker; Michael Dunn
- Cinematography: Leon Shamroy
- Edited by: Rita Roland
- Music by: Jerry Goldsmith
- Distributed by: Twentieth Century Fox
- Release date: August 6, 1969
- Running time: 116 minutes
- Country: United States
- Language: English
- Budget: $7,870,000
- Box office: $2.2 million (US/ Canada rentals)

Justine is a 1969 American drama film directed by George Cukor and Joseph Strick. It was written by Lawrence B. Marcus (with uncredited contributions from critic Andrew Sarris), based on the 1957 novel Justine by Lawrence Durrell, which was part of the series The Alexandria Quartet.

== Plot ==
Set in Alexandria in 1938, a young British schoolmaster named Darley meets Pursewarden, a British consular officer. Pursewarden introduces him to Justine, the wife of an Egyptian banker. Darley befriends her, and discovers she is involved in a plot against the British, the goal of which is to arm the Jewish underground movement in Palestine.

== Cast ==
- Anouk Aimée as Justine
- Dirk Bogarde as Pursewarden
- Michael York as Darley
- Robert Forster as Narouz
- Anna Karina as Melissa
- Philippe Noiret as Pombal
- John Vernon as Nessim
- Jack Albertson as Cohen
- Cliff Gorman as "Toto"
- George Baker as Mountolive
- Elaine Church as Liza
- Michael Constantine as Memlik Pasha
- Marcel Dalio as French Consul General
- Michael Dunn as Mnemjian
- Barry Morse as Maskelyne
- Danielle Roter as Drusilla

== Production ==
The film's pre-production was prepared by director Joseph Strick, who intended to shoot the movie in Morocco. He did some location filming there, but fought with the executives at Fox and with star Anouk Aimée. When he did not hire others for the film as instructed by the studio and slept on the set while working on one of Aimee's scenes, they fired him and George Cukor was brought in. He proceeded to bring the film to Hollywood where the remainder of the film was finished. It became a financial flop and received negative critical reviews.

Some scenes were shot at Ennejma Ezzahra, a palace at Sidi Bou Said, in northern Tunisia.

== Reception ==
According to Fox records the film required $12,775,000 in rentals to break even and by 11 December 1970 had made $2,775,000. In September 1970 the studio reported it had lost $6,602,000 on the film.

== See also ==
- List of American films of 1969
