= The City (poem) =

Greek philosophical poem by Constantine Cavafy

"The City" (Greek: Ἡ Πόλις) is a famous Greek philosophical poem by Constantine Cavafy. It was written in August 1894, originally entitled “Once More in the Same City.” It was then published in April 1910.

== Story ==
In this poem we witness the poet's futile attempt to leave his past, in which he is trapped, because everywhere he looks he sees "black ruins" of his life. He expresses the desire he had for a trip, which would make him escape from the trivial and bleak reality that is his life. It is not just a fleeting thought, as he emphasizes that he made many attempts to put into practice what he was feeling, however every effort proved useless and his desire ended up as a past reverie.

As this is a philosophical poem, Cavafy wants to educate as well as warn his readers about the values of life. The poet concludes his poem by commenting that if a person has ruined their life in one place, then they have ruined it all over the planet. He believed that, if a person does not try to change themselves, they will not succeed in changing anything around them. Happiness is something that comes from within us and remains constant no matter where we are.

=== Excerpt ===
Original Greek	Transliteration	English Translation
Καινούριους τόπους δεν θα βρεις, δεν θάβρεις άλλες θάλασσες. Η πόλις θα σε ακολουθεί. Στους δρόμους θα γυρνάς τους ίδιους. Και στες γειτονιές τες ίδιες θα γερνάς, και μες στα ίδια σπίτια αυτά θ’ασπρίζεις. Πάντα στην πόλι αυτή θα φθάνεις. Για τα αλλού - μη ελπίζεις - δεν έχει πλοίο για σε, δεν έχει οδό. Έτσι που τη ζωή σου ρημάξες εδώ στην κώχη τούτη την μικρή, σ’όλην την γή την χάλασες.	Kainoúrios tópous den tha vreis, den thávreis álles thálasses. I pólis tha se akoloutheí. Stous drómous tha gyrnás tous ídious. Kai stes geitoniés tes ídies tha gernás: kai mes sta ídia spítia aftá th’asprízeis. Pánta stin póli aftí tha ftháneis. Gia ta alloú - mi elpízeis - den échei ploío gia se, den échei odó. Étsi pou it zoí sou rímaxes edó; stin kóchi toúti tin mikrí, s’ólin tin gí tin chálases.	There are no new places you’ll find, you’ll catch no other tide. This city will always follow you. The streets you tread will be the same, it’s in these same houses your head will turn grey, in the same neighbourhoods that you’ll age. Always you’ll end up in this city. Don’t hope to turn the page to an Elsewhere for which there’s no ship for you, no road shows clear. Just as you destroyed your life back here in this tiny retreat, so you ruined it world-wide.

== Structure ==
The City features aspects predominantly focused on despair, pessimism and sadness.

Both stanzas have an almost identical metrical pattern: 16-14-14-11-15-12 or 10-12-16 syllables.

The rhymes, mostly homophonous, are abbccdda and effggdde (rhymes a and e are almost identical).

The poem is written in second person singular as the poet wants his readers to relate and empathise with his feelings.

The first stanza captures the feelings of a person with hopelessness who wants to improve as well as build new foundations for their life. Specifically, it refers to someone who wishes to leave their home but feel as though they cannot fix their life in the process, no matter how hard they try. In the quote, "through the heart buried as if he were dead" emphasises the depair and desperation one feels. Unfortunately, the poet sees that the years are passing by without him having achieved anything worthwhile and important in his life. He feels like his life is slipping right through his fingers.

In the second stanza of the poem, Cavafy mentions that "you will not find new places, you will not catch another tide." In this way, the poet wants to emphasize a person's inability to escape from themselves and their choices. The most notable line "the city will follow you" implies that the past can haunt a person as wherever they go they will not be able to escape from their own truth, their own reality and their own failures.

=== Symbolism ===
Alexandria plays a key role as a symbol in several of Cavafy's poems.

In this poem, Alexandria is the symbol of the past that follows the protagonist everywhere. It is presented as the sign of failures, troubles and mistakes that people experience in their lives, whether they brought upon themselves or not.

== Translations ==
There are several translations of the poem, the most popular one being Keeley and Sherrard (1992). However, several translators have noted that some nuances of Greek have been surrendered for the sake of a 'poetic' translation. Rae Dalven, best known for her translations of Cavafy, focused on the tone of voice and accuracy of language in her translation. John Mavrogordato, an Anglo-Greek academic, titled his translation "The Town". Diane L. Durante, a student of Greek and Latin has translated the poem more literally. André Aciman wrote a short article on the role of the translator through the comparison of different translations of "The City".

== Cultural impact ==
An English translation of the poem appears in the appendix of the Lawrence Durrell novel Justine; Cavafy is a character in the work. The narrator of Justine refers to his translation of this poem as "by no means literal".

The poem is also featured at the end of the 2007 film Japan Japan, as the protagonist Imri is coming to terms with his failure to leave Tel Aviv and emigrate to East Asia. The poem is interwoven with a sequence documenting the Israeli West Bank barrier and the Qalandia checkpoint.
