= Thomas Alan =

Given name

Thomas Alan may refer to:

- Thomas Alan Goldsborough (1877–1951), U.S. jurist and politician
- Thomas Alan Stephenson (1898–1961), British marine biologist
- Thomas Alan Abercrombie, writer and professor of anthropology
- Thomas Alan Waits, singer-songwriter

== See also ==
- Alan G. Thomas (1911–1992), British bibliophile and Lawrence Durrell scholar
- Allen Thomas (1830–1907), Confederate States Army brigadier general
- Thomas Allan (1777–1833), Scottish mineralogist
- Thomas Allen (disambiguation)
- Tom Alan Robbins, American actor
- Tom Allen (born 1945), former member of the United States House of Representatives
