= Balthazar (novel) =

1958 novel by Lawrence Durrell

- First UK edition
- Author: Lawrence Durrell
- Language: English
- Series: The Alexandria Quartet
- Publisher: Faber and Faber
- Publication date: 1958
- Publication place: United Kingdom
- Media type: Print (Paperback and Hardback)
- Preceded by: Justine
- Followed by: Mountolive

Balthazar, published in 1958, is the second volume in The Alexandria Quartet series by British author Lawrence Durrell. Set in Alexandria, Egypt, around World War II, the four novels tell essentially the same story from different points of view and come to a conclusion in Clea. Balthazar is the first novel in the series that presents a competing narrator, Balthazar, who writes back to the narrating Darley in his "great interlinear".

== Epigraphs and citations ==
Durrell initially titled the book Justine II in his drafts. The novel includes several last minute changes to the publisher's proofs, perhaps most significantly the replacement and expansion of the novel's introductory note. This begins: "The characters and situations in this novel, the second of a group – a sibling, not a sequel to Justine. ..." And later: "Three sides of space and one of time constitute the soup-mix recipe of a continuum. The four novels follow this pattern. The three first parts, however, are to be deployed spatially...and are not linked in a serial form. They interlap, interweave, in a purely spatial relation. Time is stayed. The fourth part alone will represent time and be a true sequel. ..." The corrected proofs are held in the McPherson Library at the University of Victoria.

Both the epigraphs are from de Sade's Justine; the second, longer one begins: "Yes, we insist upon these details, you veil them with a decency which removes all their edge of horror; there remains only what is useful to whoever wishes to become familiar with man;....Inhabited by absurd fears, they only discuss the puerilities with which every fool is familiar and dare not, by turning a bold hand to the human heart, offer its gigantic idiosyncrasies to our view."

The book is dedicated to Durrell's mother: "these memorials of an unforgotten city".

== Plot and characterisation ==
The book begins with the Narrator living on a remote Greek island with Nessim's illegitimate daughter from Melissa (now either four or six years old – marking the time that has elapsed since the events of Justine); however the tone is very dark and opposed to the light and airy reminiscence of Prospero's Cell, Durrell's travelogue-memoir of his life on Corfu. The prolonged nature-pieces, which are a highlight of Durrell's prose, still intervene between straight linear narrative – but are uniformly of askesis and alone-ness – and have a more pronounced "prose-painting" feel to them pre-figuring Clea.

=== Part One ===
This section is given over to the story of the Inter-Linear, and quickly and unceremoniously undermines all the "facts" of Justine.

Balthazar arrives on a passing steam-boat with the loose-leafed Inter-Linear – as the narrative manuscript that Darley, the Narrator had sent to Balthazar in Alexandria is now "seared and starred by a massive interlinear of sentences, paragraphs and question marks....It was cross-hatched, crabbed, starred with questions and answers in different coloured inks, in typescript." A few secrets are rapidly revealed with a minimum of ceremony. The Narrator's memory then proceeds to Alexandria, where Darley continues to reminisce lamentingly, and seeks and sometimes finds, the characters of the earlier book.

Profligacy and sentimentality...killing love by taking things easy...sleeping out a chagrin...This was Alexandria, the unconsciously poetical mother-city exemplified in the names and faces which made up her history. Listen. Tony Umbada, Baldassaro Trivizani, Claude Amaril, Paul Capodistria, Dmitri Randidi, Onouphrios Papas, Count Banubula, Jacques de Guery, Athena Trasha, Djamboulat Bey, Delphine de Francueil, General Cervoni, AhmedHassan Pacha, Pozzo di Borgo, Pierre Balbz, Gaston Phipps, Haddad Fahmy Amin, Mehmet Adm, Wilmot Pierrefeu, Toto de Brunel, Colonel Neguib, Dante Borromeo, Benedict Dangeau, Pia dei Tolomei, Gilda Ambron.

=== Part Two ===
This section is primarily related in Balthazar's voice, and is about the novelist Pursewarden, who is modelled on the British novelist Wyndham Lewis. There is also the story of Scobie's demise: he had gone in drag to the harbour and is beaten to death by sailors, whom he might have tried to pick up, in one of the first depictions of a hate crime against a homosexual in modern British literature. In the aftermath of his death the denizens of Scobie's quarter ransack his house, steal his meagre possessions and drink all the bootleg arak he has been distilling in his bathtub. This leads to two deaths and twenty-two severe poisonings, which Durrell calls "Scobie leaving a mark on the world".

=== Part Three ===
This section is about carnival time in Alexandria, and a murder that happened during the height of Darley's affair with Justine, although it is not mentioned in the earlier novel.

=== Part Four ===
This section is given over to reminiscences of Clea, in which Balthazar reveals to Darley that while he had shortsightedly been caught up in his intrigue with Justine, and finding solace from its emotional fall-out in the arms of Melissa, the person who "really loved" him was Clea.

== Meditation on "Modern Love" ==
Durrell writes in the Author's Note : "The central topic of the book is an investigation of modern love." He leaves the term undefined, but the subjects he covers include prolonged affairs between the protagonists, mutual synchronous polygamy, homoeroticism and transvestitism, and psychological and actual sadomasochism.

The book abounds in aphorisms. "When you pluck a flower the branch springs back into place. This is not true of the heart's affections." This is "what Clea once said to Balthazar".
