= The Revolt of Aphrodite =

Pair of novels by Lawrence Durrell

- First UK editions
- Author: Lawrence Durrell
- Original title: Tunc; Nunquam
- Language: English
- Series: The Revolt of Aphrodite
- Publisher: Faber and Faber (UK); Viking (US)
- Publication date: 1968, 1970, (1974 as a single volume)
- Publication place: United Kingdom
- Media type: Print (Hardback & Paperback)
- Preceded by: The Alexandria Quartet
- Followed by: Monsieur

The Revolt of Aphrodite consists of two dystopian novels by British writer Lawrence Durrell, published in 1968 and 1970. The individual volumes, Tunc and Nunquam, were less successful than his earlier The Alexandria Quartet, in part because they deviate significantly from his earlier style and because they approach more openly political and ideological problems.

In Tunc, the protagonist, Felix Charlock, finds himself increasingly tied to the multinational corporation Merlins, which is most often simply called The Firm. He is both contractually and maritally tied to the Firm. His rebellion and attempt to escape leads to the death of his son and his own incarceration in a mental asylum. His lover at the beginning of the novel, Iolanthe, is likewise captured by the Firm through its net of contracts and capitalist acquisitions, ultimately leading to her death. In the second novel, Nunquam, Iolanthe is resurrected as a robot, which ultimately destroys itself along with the director of the Firm, Julian. The novel ends with the burning of the Firm's contracts, but no one knows if this will cause any change.

The novels are densely allusive and reflect the political tensions of the May 1968 general strike in Paris. They also address the same theme of multiplicity and contingency Durrell developed in The Alexandria Quartet, often in a way that shows Durrell's interest in Nietzsche:

'Haven't you noticed Charlock that most things in life happen just outside one's range of vision? One has to see them out of the corner of one's eye. And any one thing could be the effect of any number of others? I mean there seem to be always a dozen perfectly appropriate explanations to every phenomenon. That is what makes our reasoning minds so unsatisfactory; and yet, they are all we've got, this shabby piece of equipment'.

A similar preoccupation with narrative and "cause and effect" is introduced early in the series, and this is made explicit by the character Hippolyta: "There seems to be a hundred reasons to account for every act. Finally one hesitates to ascribe any one of them to the act. Life gets more and more mysterious, not less."
