= Panic Spring =

1937 Lawrence Durrell novel

- First US edition
- Author: Lawrence Durrell
- Language: English
- Publisher: Faber and Faber (UK); Covici-Friede (US)
- Publication date: 1937
- Publication place: United Kingdom
- Media type: Print (hardcover)
- Preceded by: Pied Piper of Lovers
- Followed by: The Black Book

Panic Spring is a novel by Lawrence Durrell, published in 1937 by Faber and Faber in Britain and Covici-Friede in the United States under the pseudonym Charles Norden. It is set on a fictional Greek Island, Mavrodaphne, in the Ionian Sea somewhere between Patras, Kephalonia, and Ithaca. The island, however, resembles Corfu strongly, and in at least one inscribed copy of the novel, Durrell includes a map of Corfu identified as Mavrodaphne.

The novel progresses through multiple perspectives in the successive chapters, each focusing on a different character. As a whole, the novel shows Durrell's myriad influences of this period, ranging from Remy de Gourmont to Richard Aldington, D. H. Lawrence, and several Elizabethan writers.

== Plot summary ==
The character Marlowe is stranded in Brindisi during political strife in Greece, and he is eventually conveyed to Mavrodaphne by the boatman Christ who serves Rumanades, a highly successful businessman who owns Mavrodaphne. He is a disillusioned schoolteacher akin to Evelyn Waugh's Decline and Fall. Shortly after arriving on the island, he meets Gordon and Walsh, both characters from Durrell's Pied Piper of Lovers.

In the third chapter, Rumanades' personal history is narrated, leading up through his display of fireworks on Mavrodaphne. This includes his capitalist successes and his acquisition of his fortune, as well as his failed marriage that his wealth could not control.

The fourth and fifth chapters have Marlowe moving into one of Rumanades' villas on the island and meeting the remaining characters, Francis and Fonvisin. The narrative then turns to Marlowe's interests in Quietism.

The subsequent chapters focus heavily on the individual characters in their own narratives: Walsh, Fonvisin, and Francis.

Returning to the present moment on Mavrodaphne, the tenth chapter, "The Music," narrates a gramophone concert leading to an evening spent on a high cliff, with Francis, Marlowe, and Walsh in conversation.

Marlowe then begins to write his treatise on Quietism, and Francis is called away from the island back to London, for which she is given a farewell celebration. However, before she can leave, Rumanades dies of a fever brought on by an evening spent in poor weather thinking of his lost wife. One of the priests dies on the same night, and this throws the small community of expatriates into turmoil as they must vacate the island, putting an end to their escape from financial crises, revolution, and the impending World War.

== The Scene ==
The novel is set on a fictional Greek island named Mavrodaphne, after the black grapes and wine of Patras. On the island, a group of expatriates from primarily Britain and Russia are enjoying the titular spring, and each chapter is written from a different character's perspective, giving his or her history leading up to their arrival on the island. Other chapters, "The Music" in particular, are set in the present on the island. The narrative style and allusive references are unique to each chapter, giving each its own stylistic independence and demonstrating Durrell's exploration of a variety of modernist modes. The chapter "Walsh" continues from Durrell's previous novel Pied Piper of Lovers.

The novel frequently alludes to the political turmoil in Germany, with reference the Berlin Olympics, as well as financial crises in the world and Greek political unrest. The character Gordon, who is in Durrell's 1935 novel Pied Piper of Lovers, is echoed George Orwell's 1936 novel Keep the Aspidistra Flying, and both he and Francis in Panic Spring echo Orwell, rounding out the series of references.

The novel also emphasises the rural life of the village and a collaborative community of exiles who have no apparent need for money or government. This is set against remembrances of the city, London, financial dependency and despair, and political unrest.
