= Pied Piper of Lovers =

Lawrence Durrell's first novel

- First edition
- Author: Lawrence Durrell
- Cover artist: Nancy Myers
- Language: English
- Publisher: Cassell (UK)
- Publication date: 1935
- Publication place: United Kingdom
- Media type: Print (Hardback)
- Pages: 374 p. (paperback edition)
- Followed by: Panic Spring

Pied Piper of Lovers, published in 1935, is Lawrence Durrell's first novel. The novel is in large part autobiographical and focuses on the protagonist's childhood in India and maturation in London. It is followed by Panic Spring, which partly continues the actions of its characters.

== Plot summary ==
Walsh Clifton is an Anglo-Indian born of an interracial couple. His mother dies during childbirth in the opening scenes of the novel. He is raised in India by his father, John Clifton, and his Aunt Brenda. Walsh is torn between his strong ties to India and his position as a colonial. He appears most comfortable around Indian characters, though they are not thoroughly developed in the novel, and he is regularly discomfited by representatives of European culture and Christianity in particular. He develops a sense of superiority over several Indian characters, typically echoing other European characters, but these feelings are regularly thwarted, often in tandem with challenges to traditional European notions of masculinity. This is compounded by Walsh's increasing awareness of his mortality, symbolized by the human ankle bone he sees in a pyre and his grandmother's morbid fixation on death.

Walsh is sent "home" to England for his education by his father, where he is again caught in a conflict between being English or Indian. The former is often associated with paternal and masculine identity, while the latter is frequently tied to maternal and feminine identity. This portion of the novel is largely concerned with his schoolboy experiences, his developing sexuality, and the eventual death of his father, who has remained in India. The protagonist has homosexual experiences, significant dream sequences, and comments on his wide readings.

The final portion of the novel consists of a bohemian stage in Walsh's life, set in Soho and outside London. He earns his living on his inheritance and by composing jazz music. Walsh ultimately rejects this lifestyle and concludes the novel with his first love, Ruth, who is terminally ill. She is diagnosed by the same doctor who delivered him and witnessed his mother's death.

== The Scene ==
The novel is set in Burma, India, London, and non-specific rural locations in coastal England. The most significant set-pieces describe rural India, coastal England, and London at night.
