= Clea (novel) =

1960 novel by Lawrence Durrell

- First UK edition
- Author: Lawrence Durrell
- Language: English
- Series: The Alexandria Quartet
- Publisher: Faber
- Publication date: 1960
- Publication place: United Kingdom
- Media type: Print (Paperback and Hardback)
- Preceded by: Mountolive

Clea, published in 1960, is the fourth volume in The Alexandria Quartet of novels by the British author Lawrence Durrell. Set in Alexandria, Egypt, in the 1930s and 1940s, the first three volumes tell the same story from different points of view, and Clea relates subsequent events.

Durrell wrote the book in four weeks.

== Plot and characterization ==
The book begins with the Narrator (Darley) living on a remote Greek island with Nessim's illegitimate daughter from Melissa. The child is now six years old—marking the time that has elapsed since the events of Justine. Darley has been able to spend this period on the island—thinking, writing, maturing—due to the £500 left him in his will by the writer Pursewarden (who killed himself).

Mnemjian arrives (unexpectedly) to see Darley with a message from Nessim and news of events in Alexandria—notably the fall from prosperity of the Hosnani family (Nessim, his wife Justine, and brother Narouz—the latter dead). Mnemjian is a prosperous barber, and possibly brothel owner.

They proceed to Alexandria, now under nightly bombardment because of the War (WW2), Darley continues to reminisce, sometimes lamenting, and seeks and sometimes finds, the characters of the earlier book.

He runs into Clea in the street—and they effortlessly pick up an affaire de coeur—this time unencumbered by the interfering physical presences of Justine and Melissa.

== Reception ==
In The New York Times, Orville Prescott noted that the novel "contained fine passages of lushly beautiful descriptive writing and one marvelously grotesque and horrible disaster," but was "more passive, reflective and meandering" than its predecessors in the Quartet; Prescott also observed that the lengthy digression on the philosophy of literature, purportedly taken from Pursewarden's notebooks, "makes astonishingly little sense." Kirkus Reviews lauded Durrell's prose as "rich with implication, color, evocation, humor, wit and poetry," with "characters [...] as vivid as dreams."
