= Lawrence Durrell Collection =

Coordinates: 51.5304°N 0.1281°W

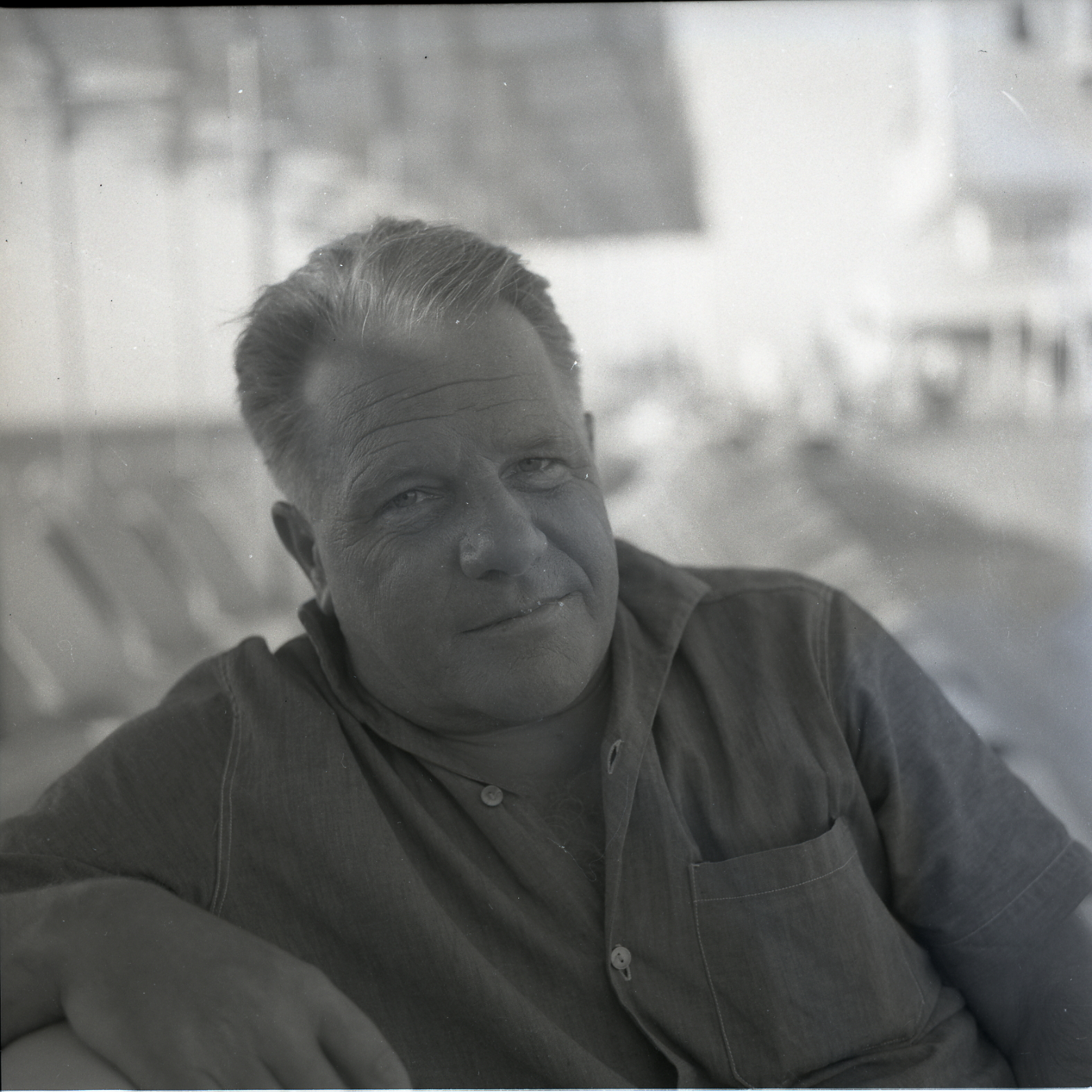
Lawrence Durrell

The Lawrence Durrell Collection is a special collection of books and periodicals by, about or associated with the novelist and poet Lawrence Durrell, donated to the British Library by Alan G. Thomas.
