= Myres: Alexandria 340 A.D =

Poem by Constantine Cavafy

"Myres Alexandria 340 A.D" (Greek: Μύρης· Αλεξάνδρεια του 340 μ.Χ.) is the longest of Constantine P. Cavafy's published poems. It was written in March 1929 and published a month later, on 19 April 1929. This poem touches upon various societal themes discussed by Cavafy, such as love, politics, and religion.

== Story ==
"Myres Alexandria: 340 A.D." follows the poet, Cavafy, adopting the persona of a young pagan. He mourns the death of the beautiful Myres and visits the Christian home of the deceased, where preparations are being made for Myres' funeral. At the same time, the poet commemorates on the hedonistic life of Alexandria, shortly before paganism and its believers were persecuted. Alexandria in 340 AD is in a transitional period as Christianity slowly begins to prevail, while paganism—with its freedom in erotic expression and the appreciation for beauty and love—now goes into a final period of decline.

=== Excerpt ===
Original Greek	Transliteration	English Translation
Στέκομουν κ’ έκλαια σε μια άκρη του διαδρόμου. Και σκέπτομουν που η συγκεντρώσεις μας κ’ η εκδρομές χωρίς τον Μύρη δεν θ' αξίζουν πια και σκέπτομουν που πια δεν θα τον δω στα ωραία κι άσεμνα ξενύχτια μας να χαίρεται, και να γελά, και ν’ απαγγέλλει στίχους με την τελεία του αίσθησι του ελληνικού ρυθμού και σκέπτομουν που έχασα για πάντα την εμορφιά του, που έχασα για πάντα τον νέον που λάτρευα παράφορα.	Stékomoun k’ éklaia se mia ákri tou diadrómou. Kai sképtomoun pou i synkentróseis mas k’ i ekdromés chorís ton Mýri den th' axízoun pia kai sképtomoun pou pia den tha ton do sta oraía ki ásemna xenýchtia mas na chaíretai, kai na gelá, kai n’ apangéllei stíchous me tin teleía tou aísthisi tou ellinikoú rythmoú kai sképtomoun pou échasa gia pánta tin emorfiá tou, pou échasa gia pánta ton néon pou látreva paráfora.	I stood at one end of the vestibule and wept. And I thought how our reunions and excursions would no longer be worth-while without Myres; and I thought how I would see him no more at our fine, immodest all-night revels enjoying himself, and laughing, and reciting verses with his perfect sense of Greek rhythm; and I thought how I had lost his beauty forever, how I had lost forever the youth whom I so madly adored.

== Techniques ==
Late Roman and Byzantine protagonists of Cavafy illustrate the religious fluidity of that era in the most consummate way. Nearly all cases show that the transition from paganism to Christianity was neither simple nor rapid. This can be seen in this poem, as Myres was a devout Christian but participated in actions deemed pagan.

Furthermore, the adoption of a pagan mask by Cavafy creates many questions about his religious position. He is known for changing his perspective on the subject of religion, sometimes writing nostalgically about paganism and at other times supporting Christianity. Ultimately, Cavafy enjoyed creating impressions about his beliefs, resulting in confusion among his scholars and readers.

This historical poem is endowed with many elements of theatricality, as the poet gives us great detailed direction of the space where the events of the poem take place and the movements of the characters.
