= Marie Aspioti =

Greek writer, poet, and playwright (1909-2000)

Maria-Aspasia (Marie) Aspioti
- Μαρία-Ασπασία Ασπιώτη
- Marie Aspioti at her desk
- Born: 29 September 1909
- Died: 25 May 2000 (aged 90)
- Occupations: Writer, playwright, poet, magazine publisher
- Writing career
- Notable works: Prosperos, Lear's Corfu
- Notable awards: MBE

Maria-Aspasia (Marie) Aspioti (Greek: Μαρία-Ασπασία Ασπιώτη; 29 September 1909 – 25 May 2000), was a distinguished Greek writer, playwright, poet, magazine publisher and cultural figure who influenced the literary and cultural life of post-war Corfu. She published the magazine Prosperos between the years 1949–1954, and Lear's Corfu in 1965. She was a close friend of Lawrence Durrell and had been awarded an MBE.

== Life ==
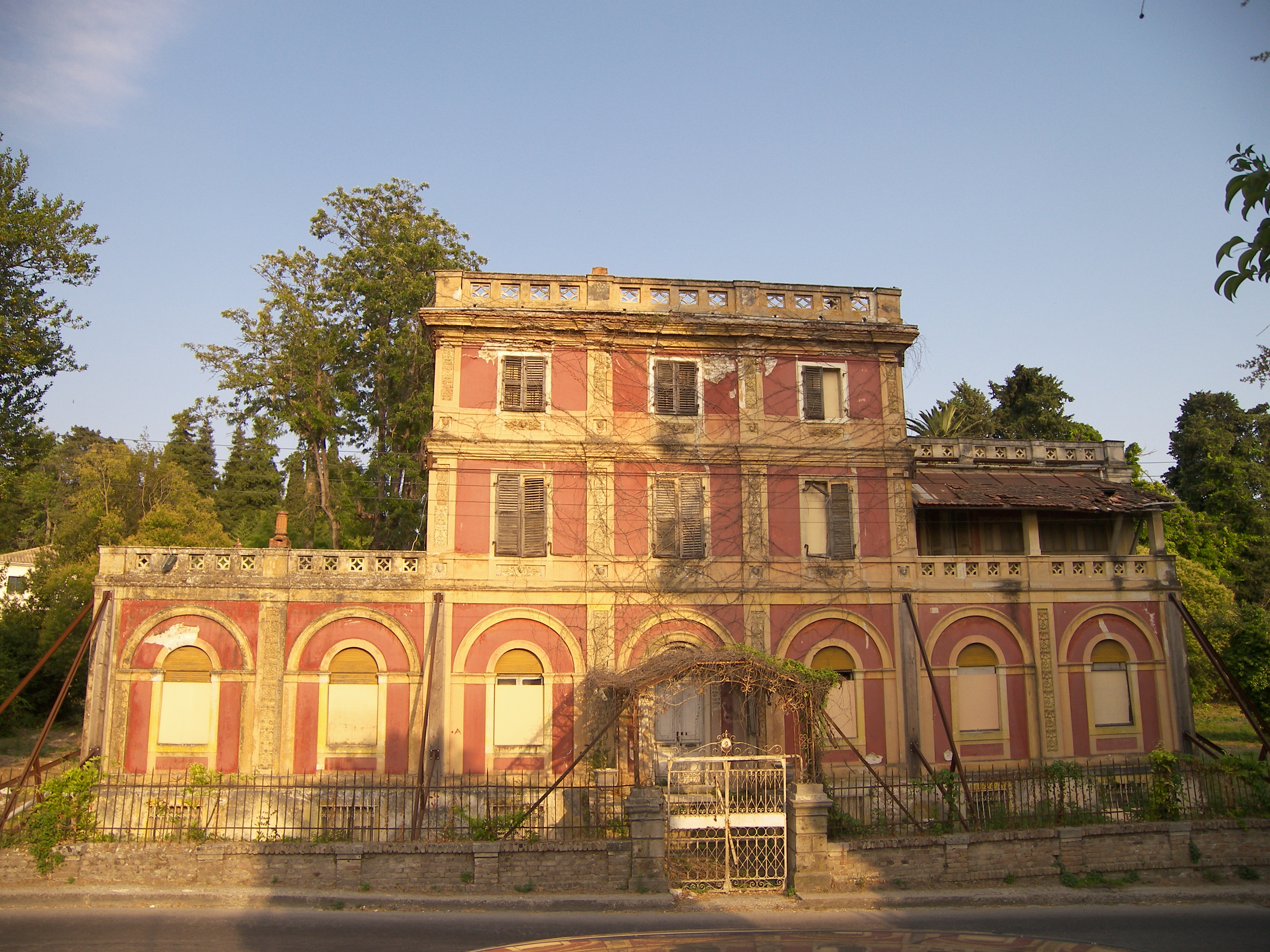
The Aspioti Mansion in Corfu

Aspioti was born into a wealthy family who lived in the Villa Rosa mansion in a suburb of the old town of Corfu. She was the daughter of Konstantinos Aspiotis, a man who became wealthy by mass-producing, in his printing shop, a kind of exclusive playing cards illustrated by his grandfather Nikolaos Aspiotis who was a painter. Eventually his company moved to Athens and became Aspioti-ELKA, a well-known printing and publishing company and one of the largest of its kind in Greece.

In 1930 Marie Aspioti published the book Corfu in French in co-operation with French writer René Puaux. Lawrence Durrell in the introduction of his publication Lear's Corfu in 1965 mentions:

She is, I think, the first Greek friend I made and as a girl in her twenties she wrote a book about Corfu in French which was the first study of the island to fall into my hands. Indeed her knowledge is as comprehensive as her scholarship is scrupulous and unobtrusive.

During World War II she became a volunteer nurse at the Corfu General Hospital. In January 1950 she published the magazine Prosperos, editions of Art and Literature of the British Council, inspired by Lawrence Durrell's work Prospero's Cell.

In Corfu she was the director of the Corfu Branch of the British Council from 1946 to 1955, and was a family friend of Prince Philip. In 1955 she resigned her position as the director of the British Council in protest against the British policies in Cyprus against enosis in trying to suppress Cypriot self-determination. At the same time she returned to the Queen the MBE she had received. She also accused Durrell of betraying his philhellenism for a few coins.

She also wrote poems and theatrical plays. In 1956 her first theatrical play O Κουρσεμένος Γάμος (The Pirated Wedding) was performed in Corfu. Her other literary works were published in Prosperos magazine and other publications in Corfu.

Later in life, Marie Aspiotis could no longer afford to maintain her Villa Rosa mansion and although the building became dilapidated she continued living there with her mother.

== Works ==
- Corfou, co-authored with René Puaux, Paris, 1930.
- O Κουρσεμένος Γάμος (The Pirated Wedding) performed in Corfu in 1956.
- So Gratious in the Time, one-act theatrical play, published in News Plays Quarterly, 1949.
- The two of Desfina (Οι δυο της Δεσφίνας) novel, published in 1959.
- The Palace of Saints Michael and George (Το ανάκτορο των Αγίων Μιχαήλ και Γεωργίου) 1964.

== References to her works ==
- Porfyras magazine no. 102 January–March 2002. Dedication to Marie Aspioti.
- Magazine Nea Estia vol. H No. 93 1 November 1930. Critique of her book Corfou.
- Magazine Nea Epohi. Spring 1960. Critique of her novel The two of Desfina.
- Newspaper Eleftheria 14 February 1960. Critique of her novel The two of Desfina.
- Newspaper To Vima 17 April 1960. Critique of her novel The two of Desfina.
