= Bitter Lemons =

1957 autobiographical work by writer Lawrence Durrell

Bitter Lemons of Cyprus
- First edition cover
- Author: Lawrence Durrell
- Original title: Bitter Lemons
- Language: English
- Subject: Autobiography
- Publisher: Faber & Faber
- Publication date: 1957
- Publication place: United Kingdom
- Media type: Print (Hardback and Paperback)
- Preceded by: Reflections on a Marine Venus (1953)
- Followed by: Blue Thirst (1975)

Bitter Lemons is an autobiographical work by writer Lawrence Durrell, describing the three years (1953–1956) he spent on the island of Cyprus. The book was awarded the Duff Cooper Prize for 1957, the second year the prize was awarded.

== Background ==
Durrell moved to Cyprus in 1953, following several years spent working for the British Council in Argentina and the Foreign Office in Yugoslavia. Having relinquished government employment, Durrell wanted to plunge himself once more into writing, and wanted to return to the Mediterranean world he had experienced in Corfu and Rhodes. He had hoped that he would be able to purchase a house in an affordable location and write. Although Durrell experienced personal difficulties—his wife, Eve, was undergoing treatment for mental illness and had left him in charge of his young daughter, Sappho (born 1951) — the book does not mention these people or incidents, aside from a few oblique references to his daughter.

In 1956, he abandoned his home on the island and left Cyprus very rapidly for a very brief residence in the UK, relocating to France for the remaining three decades of his life.

== Plot summary ==
The book is alternately comic and serious, charting Durrell's experiences on Cyprus and the people he met and befriended, as well as charting the progress of the Cypriot "Enosis" (union with Greece and freedom from British rule) movement, which plunged the island into chaos and violence. Comic moments include Durrell's successful house-buying adventure, and the visits of his mother and brother, naturalist Gerald Durrell. Durrell settled in the village of Bellapais (deliberately spelt "Bellapaix" by Durrell to evoke the old name Paix), which is now part of the mostly unrecognised Turkish Republic of Northern Cyprus.

During his stay, Durrell worked first as an English teacher at the Pancyprian Gymnasium, where several of his female students reportedly fell in love with him:

Invited to write an essay on her favourite historical character, [Electra] never failed to delight me with something like this: 'I have no historical character but in the real life there is one I love. He is writer. I dote him and he dotes me. How pleasure is the moment when I see him came at the door. My glad is very big.'

Eventually, however, "the vagaries of fortune and the demons of ill-luck dragged Cyprus into the stock-market of world affairs" and as Greek Cypriot armed groups emerged demanding an end to British rule in Cyprus. Inter communal violence between Greek Cypriots and Turkish Cypriots ensued, with Greek Cypriot nationalists wanting union with Greece. Durrell accepted a job as press advisor to the British governor. Durrell was not enamoured with the Greek Cypriot militants, however, and felt that they were dragging the island to a "feast of unreason" and that "embedded so deeply in the medieval compost of religious hatreds, the villagers floundered in the muddy stream of undifferentiated hate like drowning men." The account ends with him fleeing the island without saying goodbye to his friends, approaching the "heavily guarded airport" by taxi in conversation with the driver who tells him "Dighenis, though he fights the British, really loves them. But he will have to go on killing them—with regret, even with affection."
