= Joseph Comerford =

British irrigation engineer (1958-2000)

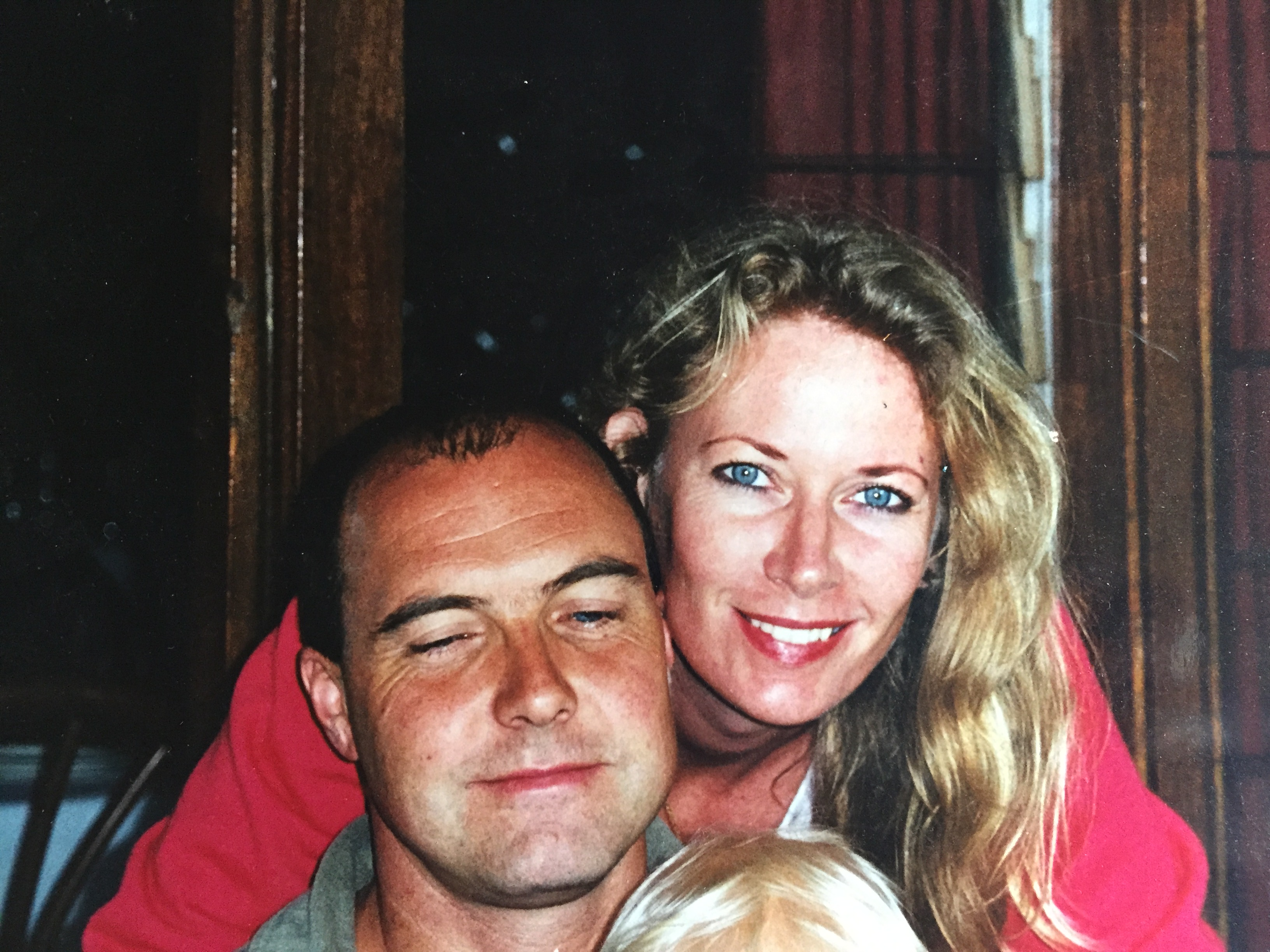
- Comerford with his wife Deborah in 1998
- Born: 18 December 1958; Liverpool, United Kingdom
- Died: 18 August 2000 (aged 41); Kisangani, Democratic Republic of the Congo
- Education: University of Cambridge (M.A.); University of Southampton (MSc); University of London; University of Bristol (PhD)
- Spouse: Deborah Verzuu
- Children: Nadia Comerford; Ragnor Comerford; Fynn Comerford

Dr. Joseph Bernard Comerford (18 December 1958 – 18 August 2000) was a British engineer and one of the UN's leading irrigation experts. He played a critical role in shaping the international humanitarian response to the Great Lakes Crisis at one of its most turbulent moments. He was responsible for providing clean water and sanitation to over a million people.

On 18 August 2000, Comerford was found dead in his hotel room while on a mission, having been sent to the Congo ahead of 5,000 UN peacekeeping troops to assess structural damage caused by an occupying force of soldiers backed by neighbouring Rwanda. His report could have led to sanctions against Rwanda.

== Early life and education ==
Comerford was born in Liverpool, the son of Bernard and Elizabeth Comerford. He grew up in Rossendale and later in Bury near Manchester with his two sisters Anne and Catherine and his brother Michael Comerford.

He studied engineering (M.A.) at the University of Cambridge, and later earned a second master in Irrigated Agriculture and Development from the University of Southampton and a certificate in development economics from the University of London. He completed his doctorate in disaster management at the University of Bristol before getting an MBA at INSEAD (Institut Européen d'Administration des Affaires) in Fontainebleau. He was described by members of the 1993 MBA class at INSEAD as "someone who used his MBA to dedicate his life, which he ultimately sacrificed, to humanitarian service. He exemplified the best ideals of vision, leadership and courage inherent in an INSEAD education." In 2010, Comerford was honoured in memoriam as one of "50 alumni who changed the world" at INSEAD's 50th anniversary celebration.

At INSEAD he was on the founding committee of INDEVOR, INSEAD's student club which serves as a forum for those interested in social, environmental, and ethical issues. His leadership led to one of INSEAD's first course offerings in ethical development, "Business and Development in the Third World."

== Career ==
After graduating from INSEAD, Comerford worked with NGOs and UN organisations such as Oxfam, UNDP and UNHCR in hazardous regions, including Sudan, Liberia, Zaire (now the Democratic Republic of the Congo), Rwanda and East Timor. Most of his assignments involved development, humanitarian assistance, disaster management and disaster risk reduction. During this time he raised three children with his wife, Deborah Verzuu.

== Death and campaign against the UN ==
In August 2000, Comerford was sent to the Congo to assess damage to sanitation caused by an occupying force of soldiers backed by Rwanda. The country was being robbed of diamonds, cobalt and ivory by troops who controlled the Kisangani mining region. The Palm Beach hotel, where he checked in on 16 August, was also used by the rebel troops for processing their illegal money and diamonds. The UN did not ensure any protection even though the area was ranked a high security risk.

On 18 August his body was found in his hotel room, suspended from the window bars by a belt. A Kenyan government pathologist concluded from broken bones in his neck that he must have been murdered, whereas a report commissioned by the UNDP under Mark Malloch Brown said it could also have been suicide.

His family was denied a proper payment by the UN's insurers. As a consequence, Comerford's wife, Deborah, began an eight-year campaign for justice with help from former friend of Comerford and lawyer Andrew Granger of Taylor Wessing, who took the case pro bono. "Because UN immunity deprives staff of access to local courts, she had no option but to tackle the organisation's internal justice system." The UN's administrative tribunal criticised the department responsible for its "reckless and callous" treatment of Joe's wife and made clear that the case was "seriously mishandled". The UN admitted as well, according to the independent Redesign Panel on the United Nations System of Administration of Justice, that the current internal justice system was "outmoded, dysfunctional, ineffective, and lacking independence". As a result of all this criticism, the General Assembly decided to introduce the new UN internal justice system.

== Publications ==
- Comerford, J.B., Martin, J, Blockley, D.I., & Davis, J.P. (1989). "On Aids to Interpretation in Monitoring Civil Engineering Systems," Proc. IABSE Colloquium on Expert Systems in Civil Eng., International Association for Bridge and Structural Engineering, Zürich, Switzerland, pp. 219–228.
- Comerford, J.B., Blockley, D.I., & Davis, J.P. (1989), A knowledge-based system to interpret results from pulse-echo pile integrity tests, Proceedings of the Institution of Civil Engineers, 90:1, pp. 189–204
- Comerford, J.B.Blockley, D.I., & Davis, J.P. (1991), 'The interpretation of pile integrity tests through intelligent knowledge based systems' ICE – Part 1, vol 90, pp. 189–204.
- Comerford, J.B., & Stone, J.R. (1992), 'AI in risk control'. in D.I. Blockley (ed.), Engineering Safety. McGraw-Hill, pp. 402–426.
- Comerford, J.B., Salvaneschi, P., Lazzari, M., Bonaldi, P., Ruggeri, G., Fanelli, M., Giuseppetti, G., & Mazzà, G. (1992). 'The role of AI technology in the management of dam safety': the DAMSAFE system. Dam Engineering, 3, 4, pp. 265–275.
- Comerford, J.B., Lazzari, M., Pina, D., & Salvaneschi, P. (1992). 'An AI approach to the integration of engineering knowledge: water resources case studies', Proceedings, AIENG 92: 7th International Conference on Applications of Artificial Intelligence in Engineering, Univ. of Waterloo, Ontario, July 1992.
- Cadei, M., Comerford, J.B., Lazzari, M., & Salvaneschi, P. (1992), Una famiglia di sistemi basati su conoscenza per la valutazione della sicurezza di opere diingegneria civile, 31° Congresso Annuale dell'Associazione Italiana per l'Informatica e il Calcolo Automatico, Torino, Italy, 21–23 October 1992, pp. 67–71
- Comerford, J.B., Lazzari, M., Ruggeri, G., Salvaneschi, P., Fanelli, M., Giuseppetti, G., & Mazzà, G. (1993). 'Causal models and knowledge integration in system monitoring'. IABSE REPORTS, pp. 331–331.
- Comerford, J.B. & Blockley, D.I. (1993). 'Managing safety and hazard through dependability' Int. J. Struct. Safety, 12, 1, pp. 21–33.
