= Mountolive =

1958 novel by Lawrence Durrell

- First UK edition
- Author: Lawrence Durrell
- Language: English
- Series: The Alexandria Quartet
- Publisher: Faber and Faber
- Publication date: 1958
- Publication place: United Kingdom
- Media type: Print (Paperback and Hardback)
- Preceded by: Balthazar
- Followed by: Clea

Mountolive, published in 1958, is the third volume in The Alexandria Quartet series by British author Lawrence Durrell. Set in Alexandria, Egypt, around World War II, the four novels tell essentially the same story from different points of view and come to a conclusion in Clea. Mountolive is the only third person narrative in the series, and it is also the most overtly political.

According to biographer Ian MacNiven, Lawrence Durrell regarded Mountolive as the clou, the nail holding together the entire structure of the Quartet. And Durrell gave to David Mountolive, his English ambassador, details from his own life: "Mountolive had been born in India, had left it at age eleven, had had an affair with a Yugoslav dancer. Mountolive had not seen his father again after leaving India, and this Larry joined to his own myth of abandonment, a myth he came absolutely to believe, that he had not seen his father after coming to England."

== Plot and characterization ==
The novel's tensions begin with young David Mountolive on the Hosnani estate, where he has begun an affair with Leila Hosnani, mother of Nessim and Narouz. This leads to a recollection of Mountolive's maturation and career as a diplomat, a career which in time returns him to Egypt, leading up to the present day of the novel series, at which point Mountolive recontextualizes the materials that appeared previously in Justine and Balthazar. Mountolive retains Pursewarden as his chief political adviser. Mountolive then introduces a Coptic gunrunning plot in support of Zionism. This plot development has been criticised as unrealistic, but more recently scholars have demonstrated the intensely political and well-informed background for Durrell's notions. Pursewarden kills himself; Nessim is warned to act to curb his brother Narouz, whose subversive rhetoric has become dangerously extravagant.

The novel ends with the Copt wake for Narouz. The Pasha has disingenuously pretended to believe he is the Hosnani in the incriminating papers so he can continue to receive bribes from Nessim. Mountolive, meanwhile prepares to turn his back on Egypt, totally disillusioned.

== Responses ==
Durrell had sent out proofs and carbons of Mountolive to a few people whose opinions he valued. Richard Aldington praised the long letter from Pursewarden to Mountolive (V), and the mourning of the Coptic women. Henry Miller admired the description of the slaughter of the camels (V). Gerald Sykes, the novelist and New York Times reviewer, found the fish drive (I) "in [Durrell's] best manner." Early reviews, following the publication date of 10 October 1958, contained contradictions. The TLS called it "possibly the most significant of the series". Pamela Hansford Johnson in the New Statesman praised the style but was critical of the absence of a "moral and intellectual centre." Time praised the imagery and "penetrant thought," but judged the novel the weakest of the series to date. In November 1958 Mountolive was named an American Book of the Month selection, which would guarantee Durrell $20,000.
