= Justine (Durrell novel) =

1957 novel by Lawrence Durrell

- First UK edition
- Author: Lawrence Durrell
- Language: English
- Series: The Alexandria Quartet
- Publisher: Faber and Faber (UK); E. P. Dutton (US)
- Publication date: 1957
- Publication place: Great Britain
- Media type: Print (hardback and paperback)
- Pages: 253 (paperback edition)
- OCLC: 257392229
- Followed by: Balthazar

Justine, published in 1957, is the first volume in Lawrence Durrell's literary tetralogy, The Alexandria Quartet. The tetralogy consists of four interlocking novels, each of which recounts various aspects of a complex story of passion and deception from differing points of view. The quartet is set in the Egyptian city of Alexandria in the 1930s and 1940s. The city itself is described by Durrell as becoming as much of a complex character as the human protagonists of the novels. Since first becoming available to the public and reviewers in 1957, Justine has inspired what has been called "an almost religious devotion among readers and critics alike." It was adapted into the film of the same name in 1969.

== Plot and narrator ==
Justine is narrated by an impoverished Irishman, not named in this novel, but who is referred to as "Darley" in the later novels of the quartet. He is a struggling writer and schoolmaster, with a background and a number of personal experiences similar autobiographically to those of the author himself. From a remote Greek island, he retells his time in Alexandria and his tragic romance with Justine – a beautiful, mysterious Jewish woman who was born poor and is now married to a wealthy Egyptian Copt, Nessim.

The scene for the story Durrell's narrator tells is the dusty, modern Alexandria of the 1930s, "an exotic city of constant interactions between cultures and religions", and with a cultural milieu that mixes exceptional sophistication with equally remarkable sordidness. Justine is portrayed by Durrell in a manner which 'mirrors' Alexandria in all of its complexities, with its mixture of elegance and extreme poverty, and its ancient Arab ways co-mingled with modern European mores. Durrell's Alexandria is a city where Europeans exist alongside Egyptians, and Jews and Christians exist alongside Muslims, and his characters, especially his lovely protagonist, she of the "sombre brow-dark gaze", mirror the city. For Durrell, his protagonist Justine is the essence of Alexandria, its "true child … neither Greek, Syrian, nor Egyptian, but a hybrid."

The character of Justine – who is portrayed by Durrell as alluring, seductive, mournful, and prone to dark, cryptic pronouncements – has been described as the centrifugal force of the novel. The narrator and Justine embark on a secretive, torrid love affair. As the adulterous lovers attempt to conceal their growing passions from Justine's husband Nessim, who is also a friend of the narrator, the resulting love triangle grows increasingly desperate and dangerous, with the narrator fearing at the book's climax that Nessim is trying to arrange to have him killed.

In the novel there are allusions to another, parallel and fictional novel by a former husband of Justine's, titled Moeurs ("Mores"), which the narrator reads obsessively in his search for clues about Justine's past life. In doing so, he learns of her propensity for many lovers, her complex sexuality, and her perpetual angst. He also discovers a diary that is kept by Justine, and quotes long passages from it in telling her story.

== Style and characters ==
The novel is an experimental work of fiction in terms of structure and style. There are no specific references to dates, although the reader may construct a rough chronology in retrospect. This can be problematic for the reader, however, for the narrative moves back and forth in time, often without explicit transitions, the narrator "letting his memory range freely over many people, many incidents, many years".

Durrell uses a highly poetic, allusive, and indirect prose style in Justine similar to the "epiphanies" of James Joyce, which places more emphasis on the lyrical dimension of the novel. Durrell's narrator explains that it is important to him to describe events not "in the order in which they took place – for that is history – but in the order in which they first became significant for me".

Although the reader initially assumes that the "chief protagonist" of the novel is the eponymous Justine, Durrell gradually builds the structure of the work around the conceit that the city of Alexandria is the most important player. Nevertheless, many colourful characters abound: the narrator's mistress, the tubercular Greek dancer Melissa; the French consular official Georges Pombal, with whom the narrator shares lodgings; the idealised but feared Doppelgänger novelist Pursewarden; the Greek broker Capodistria; and the cross-dressing bimbashi Scobie. Many of these characters practice, at least, one of the major religions of the region, but none are very religious in the more traditional sense of that notion, and Durrell describes them as "all hunting for rational reasons for believing in the absurd."

Though tragic love is the central concern of the novel, there are also hints at a deeper symbolic dimension in the form of the Kabbalah, which the main characters all devoutly study. Additionally, there are initial inklings of a socio-political narrative dealing with the workings of the British secret service, a story-line that becomes much more extended and eventually takes centre-stage in the next two books of the quartet, Balthazar and, especially, Mountolive.

== Cavafy ==
Durrell makes many references in Justine to the Greek Alexandrian poet Constantin Cavafy, and thus, the novel introduced Cavafy to a wide new audience in the English-speaking world. Two of Cavafy's poems, "The City" and "The God Abandons Antony", translated by Durrell, are included as "workpoints" in the Appendix, implying that the poems have something to say about the narrator and his plight.
