= Alan G. Thomas =

Alan Gradon Thomas (19 October 1911 – 3 August 1992) was an English bibliophile. He was both a friend of Lawrence Durrell and scholar of his works. After Durrell's death, Thomas donated a significant collection of books, journals and other materials of or pertaining to Durrell to the British Library. This is maintained as the Lawrence Durrell Collection.

Thomas was born in Hampstead, London.

== Career ==
In the 1930s, Thomas owned a Bournemouth-based antiquarian bookshop, Commin's Bookshop. He became friends with Lawrence Durrell and his younger brother Gerald soon after the Durrell family moved to Bournemouth in 1932. He became 'a kind of extra brother to the boys and a lifelong friend'. Thomas was a lifelong correspondent of Lawrence Durrell. In 1937 he visited the author on Corfu, recording his impressions of the trip in a private diary.

Thomas is the editor of Spirit of Place: Essays and Letters on Travel (1969), a compendium of letters and essays by Lawrence Durrell. Thomas wrote several other books on different topics, including Lawrence Durrell's life and works, and antiquarian book collecting, including:

- Spirit of Place: Essays and Letters on Travel (by Lawrence Durrell, edited by Alan G. Thomas) (1969)
- Fine Books: Pleasures and Treasures (1971)
- Fine Books and Book Collecting: books and manuscripts acquired from Alan G. Thomas and described by his customers on the occasion of his seventieth birthday (co-authors: Christopher De Hamel and Richard A. Linenthal) (1981)
- Great Books and Book Collectors (1983)
- Lawrence Durrell: An Illustrated Checklist (co-author James A. Brigham) (1983)

A collection of Thomas's letters to James A. Brigham is held at the University of Victoria.
