= The Alexandria Quartet =

1957-1960 Four books by Lawrence Durrell

- First UK editions
- Author: Lawrence Durrell
- Language: English
- Series: The Alexandria Quartet
- Publisher: Faber and Faber (UK) & Dutton (US)
- Publication date: 1962
- Publication place: Great Britain
- Media type: Print (hardback and paperback)
- Pages: 1110 (Faber hardback)
- ISBN: 0-571-08609-8 (paperback edition)
- OCLC: 17367466
- Preceded by: Bitter Lemons
- Followed by: The Revolt of Aphrodite

The Alexandria Quartet is a tetralogy of novels by British writer Lawrence Durrell, published between 1957 and 1960. A critical and commercial success, the first three books present three perspectives on a single set of events and characters in Alexandria, Egypt, before and during the Second World War. The fourth book is set six years later.

The work was reissued in one volume in 1962, and Durrell used the occasion to make "numerous" revisions. The 1962 edition represents his final thoughts.

As Durrell explains in his preface to Balthazar, the four novels are an exploration of relativity and the notions of continuum and subject–object relation, with modern love as the theme. The Quartet's first three books offer the same sequence of events through several points of view, allowing individual perspectives of a single set of events. The fourth book shows change over time.

The four novels are:

- Justine (1957)
- Balthazar (1958)
- Mountolive (1958)
- Clea (1960).

In a 1959 Paris Review interview, Durrell described the ideas behind the Quartet in terms of a convergence of Eastern and Western metaphysics, based on Einstein's overturning of the old view of the material universe, and Freud's doing the same for the concept of stable personalities, yielding a new concept of reality.

In 1998, the Modern Library ranked The Alexandria Quartet number 70 on its list of the 100 best English-language novels of the 20th century.
