= Zora Wolfová =

Czech translator and publishing editor

Zora Wolfová (20 February 1928 — 29 November 2012) was a Czech translator (from English) and publishing editor. Her early translations are credited under her maiden surname, Bartošová.

A native of the Czech capital, Prague, Wolfová translated more than 60 books into Czech, including Arthur Ransome's Swallows and Amazons series and Arthur Conan Doyle's Sherlock Holmes stories. She died in Prague at the age of 84.

== Translations from English into Czech ==
=== Books ===
- Allfrey, Phyllis Shand: Dům mezi orchidejemi. [The Orchid House.] Praha: Svoboda, 1986.
- Barnes, Julian: Arthur & George. [Arthur & George.] Praha: Odeon, 2007.
- Blainey, Geoffrey: Dějiny Austrálie. [A Shorter History of Australia.] Praha: Nakladatelství Lidové noviny, 1999.
- Bradbury, Ray: Smrt je vždycky osamělá. [Death Is a Lonely Business.] Praha: Práce, 1992.
- Clark, Carol Higgins: Mrtvá na pláži : detektivní příběh Regan Reillyové. [Burned.] Praha: BB art, 2006, 2009.
- Clark, Carol Higgins: Mrtvá na pláži; Případ pro dva; Krajka. [Burned. Hitched. Laced.] Praha: BB art, 2010. (+ Ivana Nuhlíčková) – collection
- Darwin, Charles: Cesta kolem světa : Přírodovědcova cesta kolem světa na lodi Beagle. [Journal of Researches : The Voyage of the Beagle.] Praha: Mladá fronta, 1955, 1959. (+ Josef Wolf)
- Darwin, Charles: O původu člověka. [The Descent of Man.] Praha: Academia, 1970, 2006. (+ Josef Wolf)
- Doyle, Arthur Conan: Příběhy Sherlocka Holmese. [The Sign of Four. The Adventures of Sherlock Holmes.] Praha: Mladá fronta, 1971. (+ Jan Zábrana, Vladimír Henzl)
- Doyle, Arthur Conan: Dobrodružství Sherlocka Holmese. [The Adventures of Sherlock Holmes. The Memoirs of Sherlock Holmes.] Praha: Mladá fronta, 1982. (+ Jan Zábrana)
- Doyle, Arthur Conan: Sherlock Holmes a doktor Watson. Praha: Ivo Železný, 1992. (+ František Jungwirth, Eva Kondrysová) – selection
- Doyle, Arthur Conan: Sherlock Holmes a ženy. Praha: Ivo Železný, 1992. (+ Eva Kondrysová) – selection
- Doyle, Arthur Conan: Sherlock Holmes : To nejlepší. Praha: Imago, 1996. (+ František Jungwirth, Eva Kondrysová, Jan Zábrana) – selection
- Doyle, Arthur Conan: Dobrodružství Sherlocka Holmese. [The Adventures of Sherlock Holmes.] Brno: Jota, 1997.
- Doyle, Arthur Conan: A Scandal in Bohemia and Other Cases of Sherlock Holmes = Skandál v Čechách a jiné případy Sherlocka Holmese. Praha: Garamond, 2007.
- Doyle, Arthur Conan: The Cases of Sherlock Holmes. The Adventure of the Speckled Band = Případy Sherlocka Holmese. Strakatý pás. Praha: Garamond, 2008.
- Doyle, Arthur Conan: The Cases of Sherlock Holmes. The Red-Headed League = Případy Sherlocka Holmese. Spolek ryšavců. Praha: Garamond, 2008.
- Doyle, Arthur Conan: The Cases of Sherlock Holmes. The Adventure of the Blue Carbuncle = Případy Sherlocka Holmese. Modrá karbunkule. Praha: Garamond, 2008.
- Doyle, Arthur Conan: Případy Sherlocka Holmese : Dobrodružství Sherlocka Holmese [The Adventures of Sherlock Holmes]; Návrat Sherlocka Holmese; Poslední poklona Sherlocka Holmese; Z archivu Sherlocka Holmese. Praha: Československý spisovatel, 2010. (+ František Jungwirth, Eva Kondrysová) – collection
- Durrell, Gerald: Chytněte mi guerézu. [Catch Me a Colobus.] Praha: Mladá fronta, 1977; Praha: BB art, 2000, 2009.
- Durrell, Gerald: Opilý prales. [The Drunken Forest.] Praha: Práce, 1982; Praha: BB art, 1999, 2009.
- Durrell, Gerald: Ostrov v nebezpečí. [The Mockery Bird.] Praha: Svoboda, 1988; Praha: BB art, 2000.
- Durrell, Gerald: Ptáci, zvířata a moji příbuzní. [Birds, Beasts, and Relatives.] Praha: Mladá fronta, 1974, 1979; Plzeň: Beta-Dobrovský, 1994, 1998; Praha: BB art, 2001, 2008, 2009.
- Durrell, Gerald: Šeptající země. [The Whispering Land.] Praha: Svoboda 1977; Praha: BB art, 2000.
- Ephron, Nora: Není recept na lásku. [Heartburn.] Praha: Aurora, 1998.
- Fast, Howard: Tony a zázračná dvířka. [Tony and the Wonderful Door.] Praha: Mladá fronta, 1957.
- Forsyth, Frederick: Žádné stopy. [No Comebacks.] Praha: Mladá fronta, 1988; Praha: Knižní klub, 2004, 2010.
- Frayn, Michael: Po hlavě. [Headlong.] Praha; Litomyšl: Paseka, 2009.
- Gilbert, Michael: Poslední kapka. [Flash Point.] Praha: Svoboda, 1982.
- Grimes, Martha: 3× Richard Jury ze Scotland Yardu. [The Man With a Load of Mischief.] Praha: Odeon, 1992. (+ Zuzana Ceplová, Jana Koubová)
- Humphrey, William: Zpátky domů. [Home from the Hill.] Praha: Český spisovatel, 1996.
- Keating, H. R. F. (ed.): Vlny zločinu. [Crime Waves 1.] Praha: Vyšehrad, 1993. (+ Eva Kondrysová, Kateřina Brabcová)
- Klíma, Ivan: Rozhovor v Praze. (Interview in Prague, conducted by Philip Roth.) Praha: Evropský kulturní klub, 1990.
- Lessing, Doris: Mraveniště. [Five Short Tales. The Habit of Loving.] Praha: Mladá fronta, 1961. (+ Olga Fialová, Wanda Zámecká)
- Lessing, Doris: Muž a dvě ženy. [A Man and Two Women.] Praha: Mladá fronta, 1970; Praha: Odeon, 2008.
- Levin, Ira: Stepfordské paničky. [The Stepford Wives.] Praha: Odeon, 1975, 1982, 1989; Praha, Ivo Železný 1999; Praha: Knižní klub, 2004, 2010.
- Lodge, David: Prázdniny v Heidelbergu. [Out of the Shelter.] Plzeň: Mustang, 1996.
- Marshall, Alan: Lidé pradávných časů. [People of the Dreamtime.] Praha: Odeon, 1966.
- Marshall, Alan: Už zase skáču přes kaluže. [I Can Jump Puddles.] Praha: Mladá fronta, 1962, 1963, 1972, 1976, 1986; Voznice: Leda/Praha: Rozmluvy, 2008.
- McBain, Ed: Dům, co postavil Jack. [The House that Jack Built.] Praha: Český spisovatel, 1993.
- McBain, Ed: Kočka v botách; Dům, co postavil Jack; Tři slepé myšky : Ed McBain omnibus : v hlavní roli Matthew Hope. [Puss in Boots. The House that Jack Built. Three Blind Mice.] Praha: BB art, 2012. (+ Miroslav Košťál)
- Mikes, George: Jak být cizincem. [How to be an Alien. How to Be Inimitable.] Praha: Mladá fronta, 1970; Praha: Ivo Železný, 1994.
- Morrison, John: Přístav naděje. [Port of Call.] Praha: Svoboda, 1976.
- Pargeter, Edith (pen name: Peters, Ellis): Megotina svatba. [The Marriage of Meggotta.] Praha: Mladá fronta, 2000.
- Parker, Robert B.: Nevěrné milenky. [Perish Twice.] Praha: BB art, 2002, 2004.
- Parkinson, C. Northcote: Nové zákony profesora Parkinsona. Praha: Mladá fronta, 1984. – selection
- Parkinson, C. Northcote: Zákon paní Parkinsonové a jiné úvahy o domácnosti. [Mrs. Parkinson's Law and Other Studies in Domestic Science.] Praha: Svoboda, 1996.
- Parkinson, C. Northcote: Zákony profesora Parkinsona. [Parkinson's Law & Other Selected Writings on Management.] Praha: Svoboda, 1967, 1995; Praha: Eminent, 2003.
- Peters, Ellis: Jeden mrtvý navíc. [One Corpse Too Many.] Praha: Mladá fronta, 1993, 2005.
- Petersová, Ellis: Malomocný u svatého Jiljí. [The Leper of Saint Giles.] Praha: Český spisovatel, 1994; Praha: Mladá fronta, 2006.
- Peters, Ellis: Osudové tajemství. [The Knocker on Death's Door.] Praha: Vyšehrad, 2001.
- Peters, Ellis: Panna v ledu. [The Virgin in the Ice.] Praha: Mladá fronta, 1996, 2007.
- Peters, Ellis: Smrt starožitníka. [Rainbow's End.] Praha: Vyšehrad, 2002.
- Peters, Ellis: Záhada staré hrobky. [A Nice Derangement of Epitaphs.] Praha: Vyšehrad, 2001.
- Peyton, Richard (ed.): Vražedné šance : detektivní a dobrodružné příběhy z dostihového prostředí. [Deadly Odds.] Praha: Olympia, 1990. (+ Jaroslava Moserová-Davidová, Jan Zábrana)
- Povídky o čínské mládeži. [True Stories of Chinese Youth.] Praha: Mladá fronta, 1950. (as Zorka Bartošová)
- Prichard, Katharine Susannah: Cirkus Haxby. [Haxby's Circus.] Praha: Odeon, 1969.
- Ransome, Arthur: Boj o ostrov. [Swallows and Amazons.] Praha: Státní nakladatelství dětské knihy, 1959; Praha: Albatros, 1971, 1982, 1998; Praha: Toužimský a Moravec, 2004, 2011.
- Ransome, Arthur: Holubí pošta. [Pigeon Post.] Praha: Státní nakladatelství dětské knihy, 1964; Praha: Albatros, 1977; Praha: Toužimský a Moravec, 1998.
- Ransome, Arthur: Klub Lysek. [Coot Club.] Praha: Státní nakladatelství dětské knihy, 1963; Praha: Albatros, 1992; Praha: Toužimský a Moravec, 1999.
- Ransome, Arthur: Lysky na severu a jiné příběhy. [Coots in the North and Other Stories.] Praha: Toužimský a Moravec, 2005.
- Ransome, Arthur: Nechtěli jsme na moře. [We Didn't Mean to Go to Sea.] Praha: Albatros, 1976, 1999; Praha: Toužimský a Moravec, 2004.
- Ransome, Arthur: Petr Kachna. [Peter Duck.] Praha: Státní nakladatelství dětské knihy, 1961; Praha: Toužimský a Moravec, 1998, 2001.
- Ransome, Arthur: Piktové a mučedníci aneb Naprosto nevítaná návštěva. [The Picts and the Martyrs.] Praha: Albatros, 1987; Praha: Toužimský a Moravec, 2003.
- Ransome, Arthur: Slečna Lee. [Missee Lee.] Praha: Toužimský a Moravec, 2000.
- Ransome, Arthur: Trosečníci z Vlaštovky. [Swallowdale.] Praha: Státní nakladatelství dětské knihy, 1960; Praha: Albatros, 1972, 1988; Praha: Toužimský a Moravec, 2002.
- Ransome, Arthur: Velká severní? [Great Northern?] Praha: Albatros, 1974, 2001; Praha: Toužimský a Moravec, 2007.
- Ransome, Arthur: Velká šestka. [The Big Six.] Praha: Státní nakladatelství dětské knihy, 1967; Praha: Albatros, 2002; Praha: Toužimský a Moravec, 2006.
- Ransome, Arthur: Záhadné vody. [Secret Water.] Praha: Albatros, 1980, 2000; Praha: Toužimský a Moravec, 2005.
- Ransome, Arthur: Zamrzlá loď kapitána Flinta. [Winter Holiday.] Praha: Albatros, 1973, 1991; Praha: Toužimský a Moravec, 2001; Praha: Albatros, 2011.
- Snow, Charles Percy: Krycí barva. [A Coat of Varnish.] Praha: Odeon, 1986.
- Stewart, Margaret: Pán v béžové limusině. [Voices of America.] Praha: Naše vojsko, 1957. (+ Zdeněk Lahoda, Jaromír Němec)
- Stout, Rex: Osudné šampaňské. [Champagne for One.] Plzeň: Mustang, 1997; Praha: BB art, 2001.
- Tey, Josephine: Skandál v Milfordu. [The Franchise Affair.] Praha: Odeon, 1979.
- Thomson, George Derwent: O staré řecké společnosti. Egejská oblast v pravěku. [Studies in Ancient Greek Society. The Prehistoric Aegean.] Praha: Rovnost, 1952. (as Zora Bartošová; + Olga Fialová, Soňa Nová)
- Thomson, George Derwent: O staré řecké společnost. První filosofové. [Studies in Ancient Greek Society. The First Philosophers.] Praha: Státní nakladatelství politické literatury, 1958. (+ Soňa Nová)
- West, Morris: Léto Ryšavého vlka. [Summer of the Red Wolf.] Praha: Odeon, 1978.
- Wodehouse, Pelham Grenville: Hry ve třech. [The Golf Omnibus.] Praha: Paralela 50, 1995; Brno: Jota, 2000.
- Yorke, Margaret: Časně zrána. [Early in the Morning.] Praha: Odeon, 1998.
- Yorke, Margaret: Kdo za to může. [A Case to Answer.] Praha: Motto, 2005.
- Yorke, Margaret: Pod falešnou záminkou. [False Pretenses.] Praha: Motto, 2004.
- Yorke, Margaret: Probuzení do krutého dne. [Safely to the Grave.] Praha: Vyšehrad, 1992.
- Yorke, Margaret: Zcela soukromá vražda. [Intimate Kill.] In: 3× ve vážném podezření. Praha: Odeon, 1992.
- Yorke, Margaret: Vražda na Akropoli. [Grave Matters.] Praha: Vyšehrad, 2003.

=== Stories ===
Her translations of individual stories by Edith Pargeter, Henry Lawson, Alan Marshall, Vance Palmer, Doris Lessing, Wyatt Rainey Blassingame, Hal Porter, and the story "Dead Roses" from the book The Burnt Ones by Patrick White have been published in Czech literary magazine Světová literatura [World Literature].

== Literature ==
- T&M (2005). "Arthur Ransome v překladech Zory Wolfové" [Arthur Ransome in translations by Zora Wolfová]. In Ransome, Arthur (ed.). Lysky na severu a jiné příběhy [Coots in the North] (in Czech). Praha: Toužimský a Moravec. pp. 152–155. ISBN 80-7264-076-3.
