= List of awards and honours received by Gerald Durrell =

This is a list of honours and awards received by Gerald Durrell.

== Honours and legacy ==
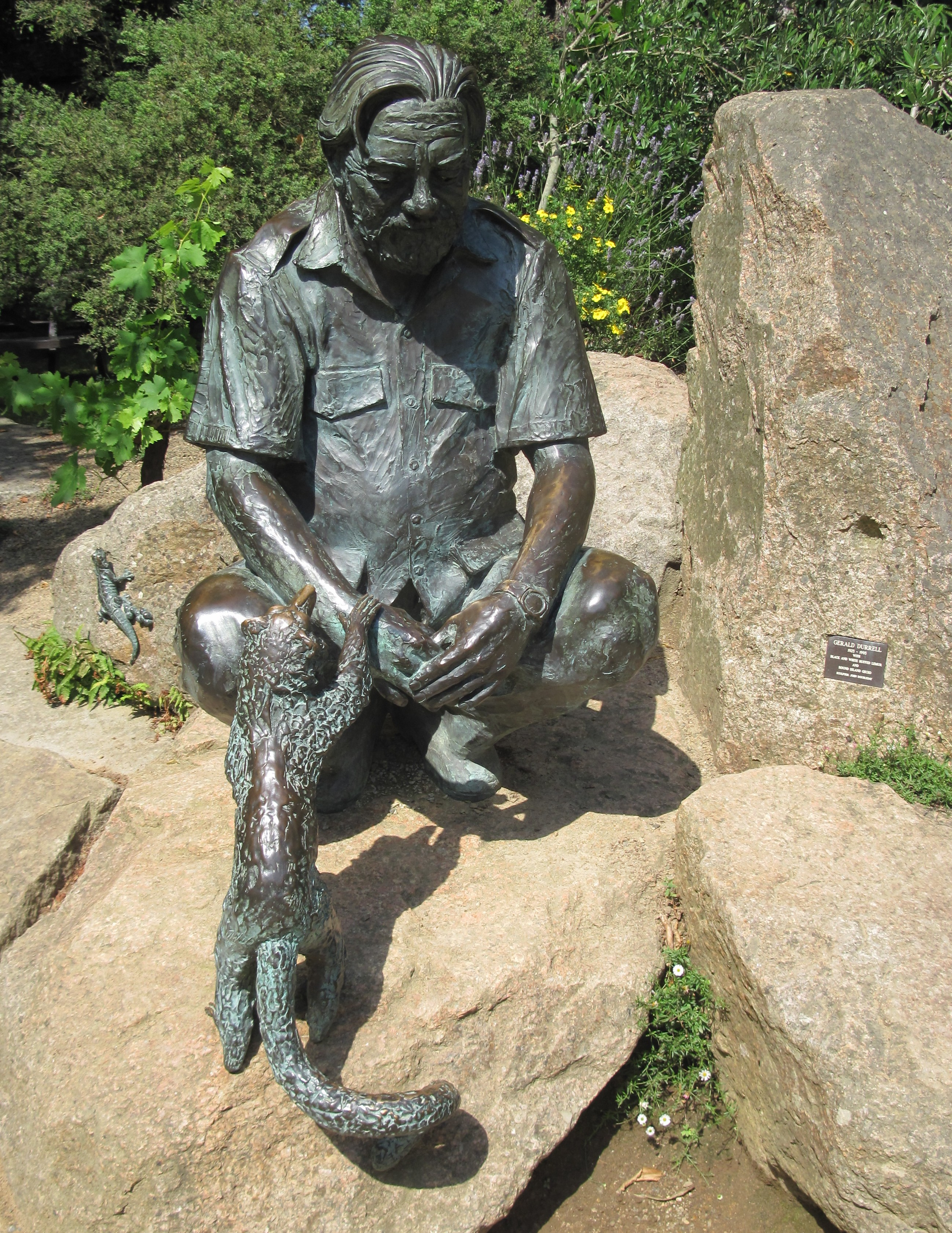
Statue of Gerald Durrell at Jersey Zoo, sculpted by John Doubleday

- Durrell was awarded the Order of the Golden Ark by Prince Bernhard of the Netherlands in 1981.
- In 1981, Durrell became a founding member of the World Cultural Council.
- Durrell received the OBE in 1982.
- The National Youth Music Theatre performed the musical theatre The Carnival of the Animals at Fort Regent, Jersey as a tribute to Gerald Durrell in 1984.
- Durrell featured in the United Nations' Roll of Honour for Environmental Achievement in 1988, becoming part of 500 people ("Global 500") to be given this honour in the period 1987–92.
- The University of Kent started the Durrell Institute of Conservation and Ecology (DICE) in 1989, the first graduate school in the United Kingdom to offer degrees and diplomas in conservation and biodiversity.
- The journal Biodiversity and Conservation brought out a special volume of the journal in tribute to Gerald Durrell, on the theme of "The Role of Zoos" in 1995, following his death.
- The Gerald Durrell Memorial Funds, launched in 1996, are granted in the field of conservation by the Wildlife Trust every year.
- The statue park in Miskolc Zoo, created a bust of Gerald Durrell in 1998. Whipsnade Zoo also unveiled a new island for housing primates dedicated to Durrell in 1998.
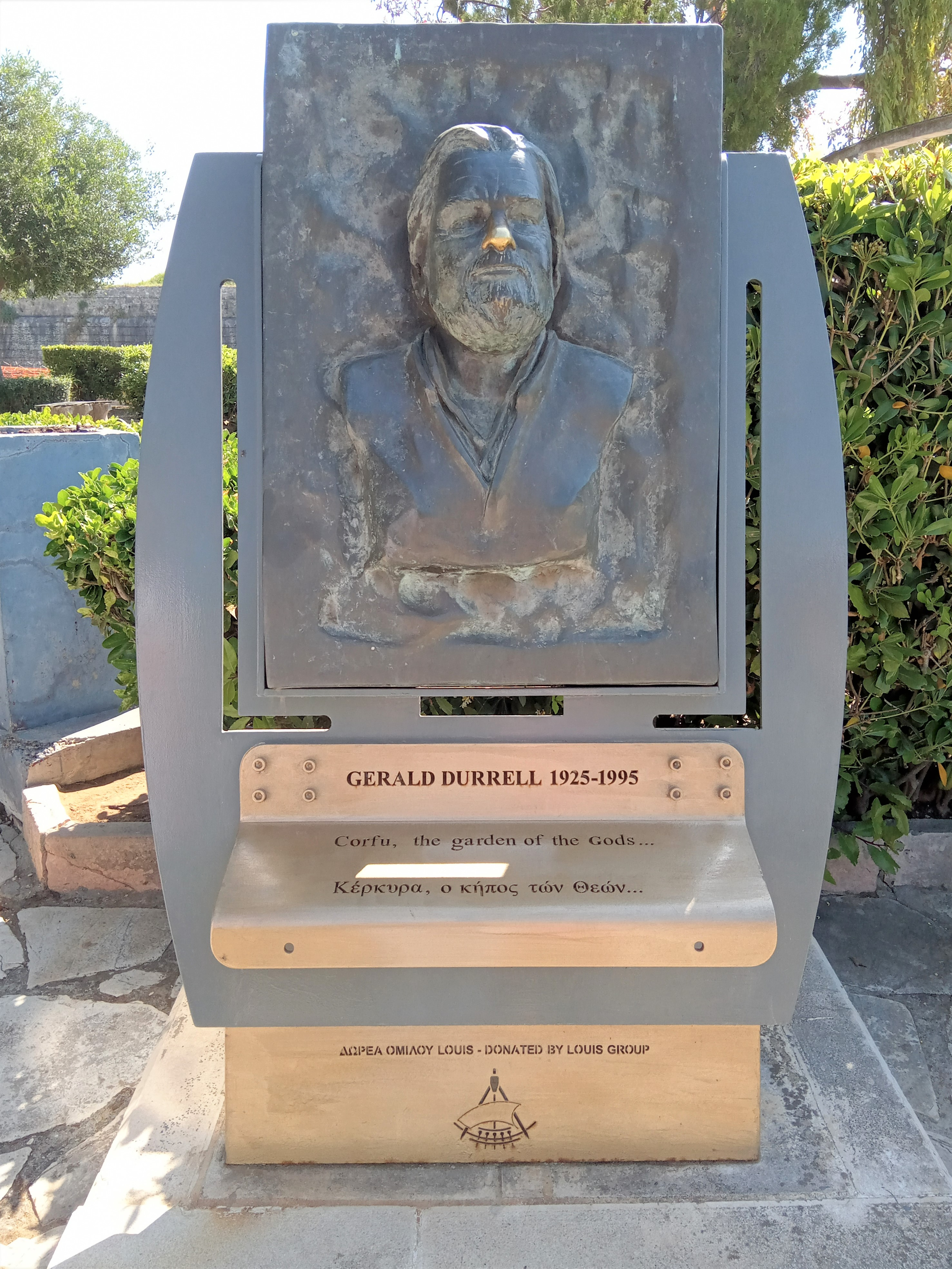
- Monument of Gerald Durrell in the Durrells' Park in Corfu town
  The Wildlife Photographer of the Year competition, owned by the Natural History Museum and BBC Wildlife, gives the Gerald Durrell Award for the best photograph of an endangered species, starting from 2001.
- The Durrell School in Corfu, established in 2002, offers an academic course and tours in the footsteps of the Durrells in Corfu. Botanist David Bellamy conducted field trips in Corfu for the school.
- The town hall of Corfu announced in 2006 that it would rename Corfu Bosketto (a park in the city of Corfu) Bosketto Durrell, after Gerald and Lawrence Durrell as a mark of respect.
- Wildlife Preservation Canada established the Gerald Durrell Society in 2006 as recognition for individuals who have made legacy gifts.
- The Gerald Durrell Endemic Wildlife Sanctuary in the Black River Valley in Mauritius, is the home of the Mauritius Wildlife Appeal Fund's immensely successful captive breeding programme for the Mauritius kestrel, pink pigeon and echo parakeet.
- The Durrell Wildlife Park has a bronze statue of Gerald Durrell by John Doubleday, cast along with a ruffed lemur at his knee and a Round Island gecko at his feet.
- Jersey brought out stamps honouring the Jersey Wildlife Preservation Trust and Mauritius brought out a stamp based on a race of a rare gecko named after Durrell.
- The de-rodentification of Rat Island in Saint Lucia by the Durrell Wildlife Conservation Trust to create a sanctuary for the Saint Lucia whiptail lizard on the lines of Praslin Island has caused an official change in name for Rat Island. It is in the process of being renamed Durrell Island.
- The Visitors' Centre at the Belize Zoo is named the Gerald Durrell Visitors' Centre in honour of Durrell.
- Cornwall college Newquay's centre for applied zoology has two buildings, one the Durrell Building, opened by his wife Lee Durrell in 2007.

=== Species and homages ===
- Salanoia durrelli: a carnivoran species related to the brown-tailed mongoose, from Lake Alaotra, Madagascar. (2010)
- Centrolene durrellorum: A glassfrog of the family Centrolenidae from the eastern Andean foothills of Ecuador, discovered in 2002 and described in 2005. This frog was named in honour of Gerald Durrell and his wife Lee Durrell "for their contributions to the conservation of global biodiversity".
- Clarkeia durrelli: A fossil brachiopod of the order Atrypida, from the Upper Silurian age, discovered 1982
- Nactus serpensinsula durrellorum: The Round Island race of the Serpent Island gecko is a distinct subspecies and was named after both Gerald and Lee Durrell for their contribution to saving the gecko and Round Island fauna in general. Mauritius released a stamp depicting the race.
- Ceylonthelphusa durrelli: Durrell's freshwater crab: A critically rare new species of Sri Lankan freshwater crab.
- Benthophilus durrelli: Don tadpole-goby: A new species of tadpole goby discovered in 2004
- Kotchevnik durrelli Yakovlev: A new species of moth of the superfamily Cossoidea from Russia
- Mahea durrelli Kment 2005: A new species of shield bug of the family Acanthosomatidae from Madagascar
