= List of expeditions by Gerald Durrell =

This is a list of animal collecting and conservation expeditions led by Gerald Durrell.

== Major expeditions ==
Year	Place	Primary purpose	Book	Film	Species in focus
1947 / 1948	Mamfe, British Cameroons (now Cameroon)	Independent animal collecting mission for British zoos	The Overloaded Ark	—	Angwantibo, giant otter shrew
1949	Mamfe and Bafut, British Cameroons (now Cameroon)	Independent animal collecting mission for British zoos	The Bafut Beagles	—	Galago, hairy frog, African golden cat, flying mouse
1950	British Guiana (now Guyana)	Independent animal collecting mission for British zoos	Three Singles to Adventure	—	Giant otter, poison arrow frogs, Surinam toad, capybara, Brazilian porcupine, curassow
1953 / 1954	Argentina and Paraguay	Partially sponsored animal collecting mission	The Drunken Forest	—	Burrowing owl, hornero, anaconda, rhea, giant anteater
1956	Bafut, British Cameroons (now Cameroon)	Animal collecting mission for his own to-be zoo	A Zoo in My Luggage	To Bafut With Beagles	Patas, galago, grey-necked rockfowl
1958	Patagonia, Argentina	Animal collecting mission for his own Jersey Zoo	The Whispering Land	Look (Argentinian Expedition)	South American fur seal, Patagonian hare, vampire bat, Magellanic penguin
1962	Malaysia, and Australia and New Zealand	Shooting of the BBC Nature series Two in the Bush	Two in the Bush	Two in the Bush	kākāpō, kākā, kea, takahē, tuatara, Sumatran rhinoceros, Leadbeater's possum
1965	Sierra Leone	Animal collecting mission for Jersey Zoo to be made into a TV series by BBC	Section of Catch Me a Colobus	Catch Me a Colobus	Colobus, African leopard, red river hog, potto
1968	Mexico	Animal collecting mission for Jersey Zoo	Section of Catch Me a Colobus	—	Volcano rabbit, thick-billed parrot
1969	Great Barrier Reef, Northern Territory and Queensland, Australia	Conservation fact-finding mission, with possible material for book never written	—	—	Great Barrier Reef species
1976, 1977	Mauritius and other Mascarene Islands	Two back-to-back conservation missions and animal collecting expeditions for local breeding and the Jersey Zoo	Golden Bats and Pink Pigeons	The Mauritius Conservation Mission, The Round Island Project	Pink pigeon, Rodrigues fruit bat, Round Island boa, Telfair's skink, Gunther's gecko, Mauritius kestrel
1978	Assam, India and Bhutan	Conservation mission and filming for an episode in a BBC series	—	"Animals Are My Life" episode in The World About Us series	Pigmy hog
1982	Mauritius and other Mascarene Islands and Madagascar	Conservation mission and animal collecting expedition for local breeding and Jersey Zoo to be filmed for a BBC TV series about the Trust's role in other countries	Ark on the Move	Ark on the Move	Pink pigeon, Rodrigues fruit bat, Round Island boa, Telfair's skink, Gunther's gecko, Mauritius kestrel, indri, Madagascan boa
1984	Soviet Union	Shooting of the Channel 4 TV series Durrell in Russia	Durrell in Russia	Durrell in Russia	Przewalski's horse, saiga, cranes, Russian desman
1989	Belize	As part of Programme for Belize — a conservation project which aimed to conserve 250,000 acres (1000 km^{2}) of tropical rain forest	—	—	Belizean rain forest species
1990	Madagascar	Conservation mission and animal collecting expedition for local breeding and Jersey Zoo	The Aye-Aye and I	To the Island of Aye-Aye	Aye-aye, indri, ring-tailed lemur, Alaotran lemur, tenrec
