= Jeremy Mallinson =

English conservationist (1937–2021)

Jeremy John Crosby Mallinson OBE FIBiol FRGS
- Born: 16 March 1937; Ilkley, Yorkshire, England
- Died: 2 February 2021 (aged 83)
- Occupations: Zookeeper; Conservationist

Academic background
- Education: The King's School, Canterbury
- Influences: Gerald Durrell

Jeremy John Crosby Mallinson OBE FIBiol FRGS (16 March 1937 – 2 February 2021) was an English conservationist and author associated with Jersey Zoo and the Durrell Wildlife Conservation Trust, where he was director.

== Biography ==
Born in Ilkley, Yorkshire, Jeremy John Crosby Mallinson was educated at the King's School, Canterbury, which he left at the age of 17 to join the Rhodesia and Nyasaland Staff Corps for two years as a means to discover wildlife in Africa. Upon returning to Jersey he joined the recently opened Jersey Zoo (now Durrell Wildlife Conservation Trust) in 1959; he became Head of Mammals, and soon after the director of the Trust. He held the latter position until he retired in 2002.

Mallinson was a close personal friend of Gerald Durrell, the founder of the Durrell Wildlife Park and Durrell Wildlife Conservation Trust. Mallinson was the best man at Durrell's wedding to his second wife, Lee .

During Mallinson's early days at Jersey Zoo he was charged with trapping and bringing back endangered species from often hardly explored parts of the world. In 1965 he spent two months in the Bolivian jungle attempting to find the elusive Mitla (a legendary half-cat, half-dog animal) described by Colonel Percy Fawcett (who had disappeared in the Mato Grosso in 1925). He was particularly interested in primates, from lion tamarins to gorillas, and his first love at the zoo was N'Pongo (a female gorilla) who he used to take out in Jersey to raise money to find her a mate.

Mallinson published over 210 articles for some 50 publications, and also authored books about his animal experiences at the zoo, and on animal collecting or conservation missions for the Trust. He also published a book on book frontispieces and cover pages dedicated to him by personal friends Gerald Durrell and Lawrence Durrell. He also brought out a novel in 2004, titled The Count's Cats.

Mallinson travelled extensively in Africa, Asia and South America. In the course of his work he reared a lioness and a cheetah outside the auspices of the Durrell Wildlife Park. He served on various national and international committees of governmental and non-governmental organisations as well as having been on a number of editorial boards. He presented papers at conferences in 20 different countries.

Mallinson was awarded the OBE in 1997 for services to conservation. In 1998 he received The World Zoo Organisation's Heini Hediger Award. He was also awarded the 'Wildlife Conservation Award' from the Zoological Society of San Diego and an honorary degree of Doctor of Science (DSc) from the University of Kent in Canterbury upon retirement in 2000. In 2002 he received an Outstanding Achievement Award from the Federation of Zoological Gardens of Great Britain and Ireland, as well as being the recipient of the Zoological Society of San Diego's "Wildlife Conservation Award" (gold medal).

Mallinson died on 2 February 2021, aged 83.

== Bibliography ==
- Okavango Adventure: In Search of Animals in Southern Africa, David and Charles Group, (1973), ISBN 0-7153-6259-3
- Earning Your Living with Animals, David and Charles Group, (1975) ISBN 0-7153-6760-9
- The Shadow of Extinction: Europe's Threatened Wild Mammals (illustrated by Don Cordery), Macmillan, (1978) ISBN 0-333-19214-1
- The Facts About a Zoo: Featuring the Jersey Wildlife Preservation Trust (photographs by Al Vandenburg), Carlton Books, (1980), ISBN 0-233-97239-0
- Travels in Search of Endangered Species, David and Charles Group, (1989), ISBN 0-7153-9346-4
- The Count's Cats, Llumina Press, (2004), ISBN 1-932560-81-5
- The Touch of Durrell, Book Guild Publishing, (2009), ISBN 978-1-84624-370-7 Updated paperback edition (2018), ISBN 978-1912575-435
- Les Minquiers~Jersey's Southern Outpost, Seaflower Books, (2011), ISBN 978-1-906641-33-7
- Someone Wishes To Speak To You, Book Guild Publishing, (2014), ISBN 978-1-909984-39-4

=== Edited ===
- Such Agreeable Friends: Adventures with Animals, Universe Books, (1977), ISBN 0-87663-302-5
- Modern Classic Animal Stories, David and Charles Group, (1977), ISBN 0-7153-7433-8
- "Durrelliania": An Illustrated Checklist of Inscribed Books of Lawrence Durrell and Gerald Durrell and Associated Publications, Letters and Notes in the Library of Jeremy J. C. Mallinson, Privately printed first edition, (1999), other edition ISBN 1-900375-04-4
