= Durrell in Russia =

Durrell in Russia may refer to:

- Durrell in Russia (TV series), a TV series hosted by Gerald Durrell and Lee Durrell
- Durrell in Russia (book), a book written by Gerald Durrell and Lee Durrell, based on the TV series
