= Ark on the Move =

Ark on the Move may refer to:

- Ark on the Move (book), a 1982 book by Gerald Durrell about an expedition
- Ark on the Move (TV series), 1982 Canadian TV series narrated by and starring Gerald Durrell
