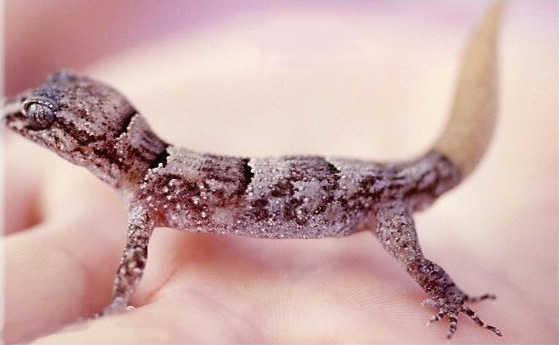

Conservation status
- Vulnerable (IUCN 3.1)

Scientific classification
- Kingdom: Animalia
- Phylum: Chordata
- Class: Reptilia
- Order: Squamata
- Suborder: Gekkota
- Family: Gekkonidae
- Genus: Nactus
- Species: N. durrellorum

Binomial name
- Nactus durrellorum Arnold & Jones, 1994

Synonyms
- Nactus serpensinsula durrellorum Arnold & Jones, 1994; Nactus durrelli Arnold & Jones, 1994; Nactus serpensinsula durrelli Arnold & Jones, 1994

= Durrell's night gecko =

Species of lizard

The Durrell's night gecko (Nactus durrellorum) is a species of lizard in the family Gekkonidae. The species is endemic to the Round Island of Mauritius.

== Etymology ==
The specific name, durrellorum, is in honor of English zookeeper Gerald Durrell and his second wife, American-born zookeeper Lee McGeorge Durrell.

== Taxonomy ==
The Durrell's night gecko was described as a subspecies of the Serpent Island gecko, and further erected as a new species in 2000.

When naming it as a new subspecies in 1994, Arnold and Jones used durrelli, which is genitive singular, as the subspecific name. In 2004 Michels and Bauer pointed out that because the subspecies is named in honor of two people, the subspecific name should be in the genitive plural. Accordingly, they changed durrelli to durrellorum.
