= The Overloaded Ark =

1953 book by Gerald Durrell

- First edition
- Author: Gerald Durrell
- Illustrator: Sabine Baur
- Language: English
- Genre: Biographical novel
- Publisher: Faber & Faber
- Publication date: 1953
- Media type: Print
- Pages: 238
- ISBN: 0-571-05371-8

The Overloaded Ark, first published in 1953, is the debut book by British naturalist Gerald Durrell. It is the chronicle of a six-month collecting trip, from December 1947 to August 1948, to the West African colony of British Cameroon – now split between Cameroon and Nigeria – that Durrell made with aviculturist and ornithologist John Yealland.

Their reasons for going on the trip, he wrote in the book, were twofold: "to collect and bring back alive some of the fascinating animals, birds, and reptiles that inhabit the region", and secondly, for both men to realise a long cherished dream to see Africa.

Its combination of comic exaggeration and environmental accuracy, portrayed in Durrell's light, clever prose, made it a great success. It launched Durrell's career as a writer of both non-fiction and fiction, which in turn financed his work as a zookeeper and conservationist.

The Bafut Beagles and A Zoo in My Luggage are sequels of sorts, telling of his later returns to the region.

== History ==
Durrell had married Jacqueline Sonia Wolfenden (Jacquie Durrell), 21, a music student, on 26 February 1951. She knew that he could keep a company spellbound with his talk, and wondered why he could not present stories of his animal collecting to a wider audience. Durrell, having criticized a BBC radio talk about life in West Africa, sent in a fifteen-minute radio script about his trials attempting to catch a hairy frog in the Cameroons. It was his first piece of professional writing.

The BBC accepted the script, which he read, live, on the BBC Home Service the morning of Sunday 9 December 1951. The Overloaded Ark appeared in 1953.
