= Three Singles to Adventure =

1954 book by Gerald Durrell

- 1965 edition
- Author: Gerald Durrell
- Illustrator: Sabine Baur
- Language: English
- Genre: Biographical novel
- Publisher: Faber & Faber
- Publication date: 1954
- Media type: Print

Three Singles to Adventure (American title: Three Tickets to Adventure) is the second book by British naturalist Gerald Durrell about trips collecting animals for zoos. It is the chronicle of a six-month collecting trip in 1950 to the South American country of British Guyana, now Guyana. Adventure was the name of a town.

Animals captured by Durrell in the book include iguanas, anacondas, squirrel monkeys, sloths and an anteater.

Durrell wrote books to pay for his expeditions and, later, his conservation efforts. His first book The Overloaded Ark was a huge success, with its mix of comic exaggeration and serious natural observations, leading him to follow up with other accounts.
