= The Stationary Ark =

- Starring: Gerald Durrell
- Narrated by: Gerald Durrell
- Country of origin: Canada
- Original language: English
- No. of episodes: 13

Production
- Running time: 30 minutes

Original release
- Release: 16 September – 9 December 1975

The Stationary Ark is a documentary television miniseries hosted by zoologist Gerald Durrell on location at his Jersey Zoological Park. It was based on his 1976 book of the same name. The series was produced by Canadian company Nielsen-Ferns and aired from September to December 1975 on CBC Television and TVOntario. Ark on the Move, a follow-up TV series, was also hosted by Gerald Durrell.

== Theme song ==
The theme to Stationary Ark, originally composed by John Mills-Cockell, became popularized in the mid-1980s with a cover version (only very loosely based on the original theme) released by Georg Feil for the Commodore 64 and its SID chip.
