= Jacquie Durrell =

British author (born 1929)

Jacqueline Sonia Durrell (née Wolfenden; born 17 November 1929) is a British author. Once married to naturalist Gerald Durrell, she worked alongside him for many years. She assisted him on several of his animal collecting expeditions and at Jersey Zoo, which he founded. The Durrells divorced in 1979.

== Marriage to Gerald Durrell ==
Jacqueline Sonia Wolfenden was born in Manchester on 17 November 1929. When she was 19, she met Gerald Durrell, during his first stay in her father's hotel in Manchester after an animal-collecting expedition. The two began dating, although initially Jacquie claimed that she was very reluctant to become Durrell's girlfriend. Jacquie's father did not approve of her relationship with Durrell, and was completely antipathetic towards the idea of the couple's marriage, chiefly because he considered that Durrell had no money and apparently no career prospects. Jacquie could not marry without her parents' permission until she was 21, so after her 21st birthday, she and Durrell eloped and married in Bournemouth on 26 February 1951. Gerald Durrell's mother, sister Margaret Durrell and brother Leslie Durrell helped to organise and attended the wedding and subsequent party. In marrying Durrell, Jacquie gave up her potential career as an opera singer for which she had been in training since the age of 17. She also gave up her relationship with her father – after her elopement, she never spoke to any of her relatives again.

After their marriage, lack of money prevented Jacquie and Gerald from renting a place of their own, and so they lived in a cramped bedsitter in the Bournemouth guest house owned and run by Durrell's sister Margaret Durrell, who offered them the place rent-free. Despite her initial trepidation, Jacquie was completely accepted by and liked all members of the Durrell family, including famous author Lawrence Durrell, a meeting with whom she describes in Beasts in My Bed.

Jacquie, together with Lawrence Durrell, encouraged Gerald to write books about his animal-collecting expeditions, in order to make money to fund both their everyday lives and new expeditions. In Gerald Durrell's autobiographical books, Jacquie is typically portrayed as a supportive spouse, who is not squeamish with or perturbed by animals.

She also helped run Jersey Zoo and found the Jersey Wildlife Preservation Trust (now the Durrell Wildlife Conservation Trust), though she never held any official post. She was also the central figure in organising one of the expeditions to Argentina, her role in which is described in Gerald Durrell's The Whispering Land. Jacquie was popular with the Jersey Zoo staff and affectionately known as "Mrs. D". Despite her support for her husband's work, she was occasionally overwhelmed by Durrell's total devotion to it, and felt that the zoo took over their lives and left them with no free space to develop their own relationship.

Jacquie featured in three TV series presented by Gerald Durrell: To Bafut With Beagles, BBC (1958), Look (Argentinian Expedition), single episode of series, BBC (1961) and Two in the Bush, BBC (1963).

She separated from and divorced Gerald Durrell in 1979, citing his increasing work pressure, and associated alcoholism.

== Books ==
Jacquie Durrell is the author of two autobiographical accounts concerning her life with Gerald Durrell, Beasts in My Bed (footnotes by Gerald Durrell) (Collins, 1967), and Intimate Relations (Collins, 1976). Both of her books are written in the same humorous, light-hearted tone as her husband's own accounts. They have a dry wit and humour, and Beasts in My Bed also features (often deliberately contradictory) footnotes by Gerald Durrell. Her books have been translated into several languages, including Russian, Dutch, Hungarian and Latvian.

Jacquie Durrell went on a number of animal collecting expeditions with Gerald Durrell and, in addition to describing these in her own books, her participation is featured in a number of Durrell's books, including:

- Argentina (1954, 1958) (The Drunken Forest, The Whispering Land)
- Cameroon (1957) (A Zoo in My Luggage – an account of her meeting with the Fon of Bafut Achirimbi II is described here)
- New Zealand-Australia-Malaysia (1961) (Two in the Bush)
- Mexico (1966) (Catch Me a Colobus)
