= Ark on the Move (TV series) =

Canadian television documentary series

- Starring: Gerald Durrell
- Narrated by: Gerald Durrell
- Country of origin: Canada
- Original language: English
- No. of episodes: 13

Production
- Producer: Paula Quigley
- Running time: 30 minutes

Original release
- Release: 4 January – 29 March 1982

Ark on the Move is a documentary television miniseries hosted by zoologist Gerald Durrell on location in Madagascar and Mauritius. The series was produced by Canadian company Nielsen-Ferns and aired from January to March 1982 on CBC Television. It was directed by Alastair Brown and produced by Paula Quigley for Nielsen-Ferns, and was a follow-up to the earlier successful series The Stationary Ark. It was a documentary illustrating the work of the Jersey Wildlife Preservation Trust (now Durrell Wildlife Conservation Trust) overseas and in the field. It illustrated the ideas of captive breeding and the professional life of a naturalist. The primary target audience was children.
