= World Conference on Breeding Endangered Species in Captivity as an Aid to their Survival =

The World Conference on Breeding Endangered Species in Captivity as an Aid to their Survival (WCBESCAS) is the world's first conference on captive breeding. Started by the Fauna and Flora Preservation Society, due to efforts by the famous naturalist and pioneer of captive breeding Gerald Durrell, the first conference was held in 1972 at Jersey (the location of Durrell's Jersey Zoo, one of the few zoos of the world to practise captive breeding at that time). The conference provided a common scientific meeting ground for captive breeding issues for the first time. The conference has been held at:

- 1st WCBESCAS; Jersey, 1972
- 2nd WCBESCAS; London, 1976
- 3rd WCBESCAS; San Diego, 1979
- 4th WCBESCAS; Harderwijk, 1984
- 5th WCBESCAS; Cincinnati, 1988
- 6th WCBESCAS; Jersey, 1992, 'The Roles of Zoos in Global Conservation'
- 7th WCBESCAS; Cincinnati, 1999, 'Linking Zoos and Field Research to Advance Conservation'

== Proceedings of the Conference ==
- Robert D. Martin (ed.): Breeding Endangered Species in Captivity. Academic Press, London 1975, ISBN 0-12-474850-3
- Peter J.S. Olney (ed.): International Zoo Yearbook 1977, Vol 17, London 1977, ISSN 0074-9664 (Section I: Proceedings of the Second World Conference of Breeding Endangered Species in Captivity)
- Peter J.S. Olney (ed.): International Zoo Yearbook 1980, Vol 20, London 1980, ISSN 0074-9664 (Section I: Proceedings of the Third World Conference of Breeding Endangered Species in Captivity)
- Peter J.S. Olney (ed.): International Zoo Yearbook 1984/85, Vol 24/25, London 1986, ISSN 0074-9664 (Section I: Proceedings of the Fourth World Conference of Breeding Endangered Species in Captivity)
- Betsy Lynne Dresser, R.W. Reece & Edward J. Maruska (eds.), Proceedings, 5th World Conference on Breeding Endangered Species in Captivity, October 9–12, 1988, Cincinnati, Ohio. Cincinnati Zoo and Botanical Garden, Cincinnati, Ohio, 1988, 723 p.
- Peter J.S. Olney, Georgina M. Mace & Anna T.C. Feistner (eds.): Creative Conservation. Interactive management of wild and captive animals. Chapman & Hall, London 1994, ISBN 0-412-49570-8 (This book is the result of the deliberations of the Sixth World Conference on Breeding Endangered Species, held in Jersey 1992. Editors and contributors have further developed the key issues tackled at the conference and the resulting chapters represent a kind of updated conference proceedings.)
- Terri L. Roth, W.F. Swanson & L.K. Blattman (eds.), Proceedings of Seventh World Conference on Breeding Endangered Species: Linking Zoos and Field Research to Advance Conservation, Cincinnati, Ohio, May 22–26, 1999. Cincinnati Zoo and Botanic Garden, Cincinnati, Ohio, 1999, 349 p.

== See also ==
- Ex-situ conservation

=== References ===
- Jeremy J.C. Mallinson; The Evolution of the World Conference Series on Breeding Endangered Species, 1972-1999; International Zoo News, Vol. 46/5 (No. 294); July/August 1999
