= Ralph Thompson (illustrator) =

British artist and book illustrator

Ralph Shillito Thompson MBE (Thorner, 3 June 1913 – 3 May 2009) was a British artist and book illustrator, who specialized in pen and ink sketches of animal subjects. His most noteworthy works are his series of book illustrations for the famous naturalist and author Gerald Durrell in the period 1954 to 1964 when Durrell was associated with the publishing firm of Rupert Hart-Davis. During this period of time, he visited Gerald Durrell's Jersey Zoo numerous times to sketch his subjects, especially when working on the illustrations of Menagerie Manor.

He has illustration credits for numerous other animal books and stories mostly for children and young adults, as well as commissioned animal posters and drawings.

Thompson also illustrated picture books like Chess Dream in a Garden by Rosemary Sutcliff.

He was the author of three books on animal illustration.

- A Brush with Animals, Rupert Hart-Davis 1963
- An Artist's Safari, Collins 1970

Reader's Digest issued a sketchbook of Thompson in 1970 titled Animals Through the Eyes of an Artist.

An exhibition of his works was part of the 2009 Cookham Festival.
