= The Drunken Forest =

1956 book by Gerald Durrell

- First edition
- Author: Gerald Durrell
- Illustrator: Ralph Thompson
- Language: English
- Genre: Natural science
- Publisher: Rupert Hart-Davis
- Publication date: 1956
- Publication place: UK
- Media type: Print (hardback)
- Pages: 238 pp (1st edition hardback)
- OCLC: 752649018
- Preceded by: The New Noah (1955)
- Followed by: My Family and Other Animals (1956)

First published in 1956, The Drunken Forest is an account of a six-month trip Gerald Durrell made with his wife Jacquie to South America (Argentina and Paraguay) in 1954. The work was published in Latvian in 1980 by the Liesma publishing house together with Durrell's other book "The Land of Mysterious Noises".
