= Catch Me a Colobus =

British children's television series

Catch Me a Colobus is a television series narrated by Gerald Durrell, the well-known British naturalist and writer, which was shown on BBC children's television in 1966.

It described an expedition to Sierra Leone to catch colobus monkeys for Durrell's zoo in Jersey.

Durrell also wrote a 1972 book of the same name.
