= John Yealland =

British aviculturist and ornithologist (1904–1983)

- Born: 1904
- Died: 1983
- Occupations: Ornithologist, aviculturist

John James Yealland (1904 – 1983) was a noted British aviculturist and ornithologist. He is best remembered for helping Sir Peter Scott found the Wildfowl Trust at Slimbridge, Gloucestershire. He accompanied Gerald Durrell on his first animal collecting expedition to the British Cameroon in 1947 - 1948. He went on to become the Curator of Birds, London Zoo.
