= The New Noah =

1955 book by Gerald Durrell

- First edition
- Author: Gerald Durrell
- Publisher: Collins
- Publication date: 1955

The New Noah is a book written by British naturalist and writer Gerald Durrell. It was first published by Collins in 1955.

The book is an account for older children of his various expeditions to collect animals for zoos, to some extent an anthology of the best bits from various previous accounts.
