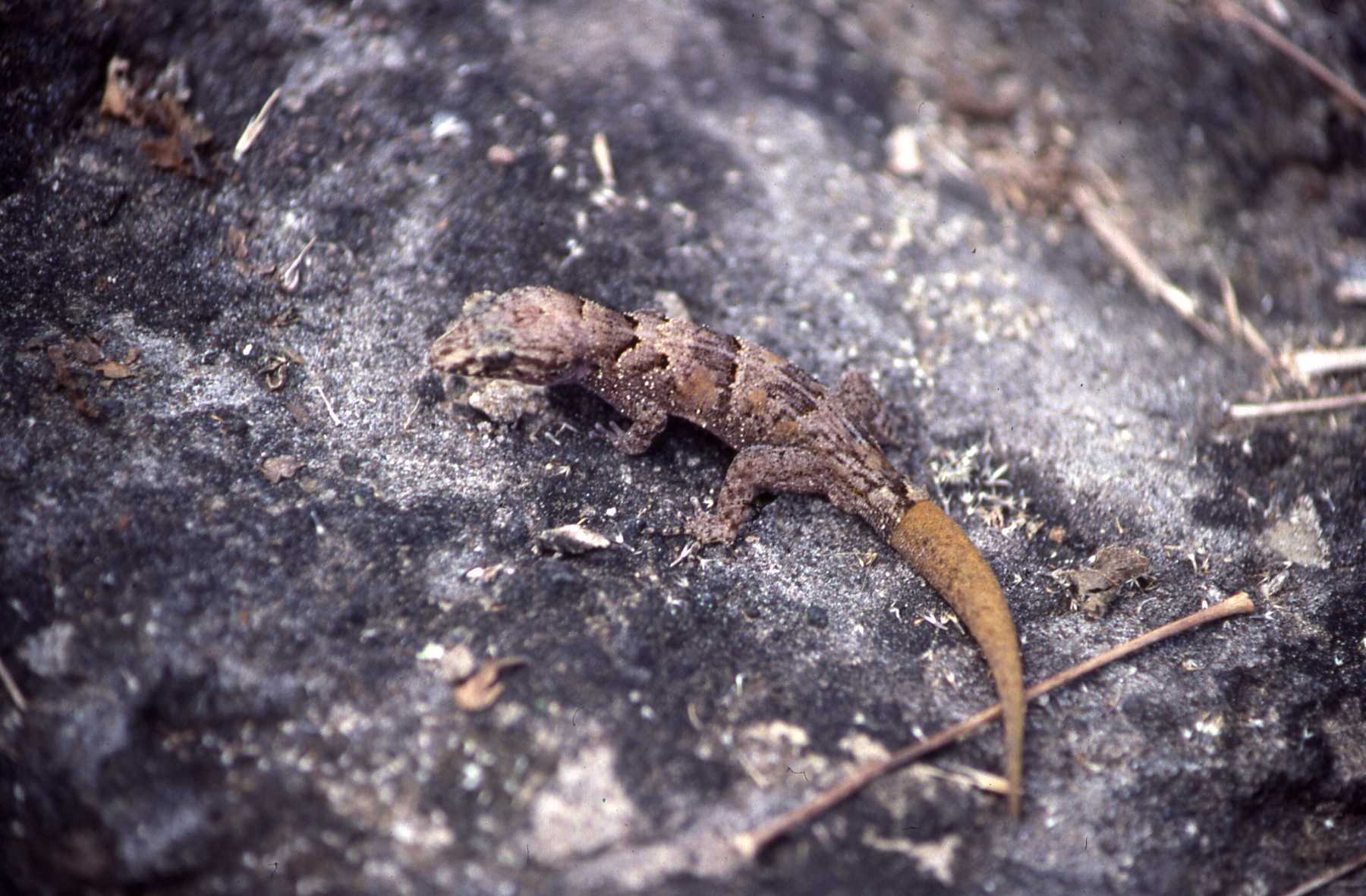
- Round Island Night Gecko (Nactus serpensinsula ssp. durrellorum), August 1989, Mauritius

Conservation status
- Vulnerable (IUCN 3.1)
- CITES Appendix II

Scientific classification
- Kingdom: Animalia
- Phylum: Chordata
- Class: Reptilia
- Order: Squamata
- Suborder: Gekkota
- Family: Gekkonidae
- Genus: Nactus
- Species: N. serpensinsula

Binomial name
- Nactus serpensinsula (Loveridge, 1951)

Synonyms
- Gymnodactylus serpensinsula Loveridge, 1951; Cyrtodatylus serpeninsula [sic] — Underwood, 1954; Cyrtodatylus serpensinsula; Nactus serpensinsula — Kluge, 1983

= Serpent Island gecko =

Species of lizard

The Serpent Island gecko (Nactus serpensinsula) is a species of lizard in the family Gekkonidae. The species is endemic to Serpent Island in Mauritius (an island country in the Indian Ocean).

The Serpent Island gecko is a monotypic species. The Durrell's night gecko, endemic to the Round Island of Mauritius, was previously treated as a subspecies of Serpent Island gecko.

On Mauritius itself, it is only known from fossils.
