= The Whispering Land =

1961 book by Gerald Durrell

- First edition (publ. Rupert Hart-Davis)
- Author: Gerald Durell
- Illustrator: Ralph Thompson
- Publication date: 1961
- ISBN: 9780143037088

The Whispering Land is an autobiographical account of the 8 months Gerald Durrell spent travelling in Argentina during the late 1950s, collecting animals for his then recently founded Jersey Zoo. The book is divided into two parts. In the first, Durrell travels south from Buenos Aires to the arid scrublands of Patagonia; in the second he is based at a small town in the north western province of Jujuy.

== Plot summary ==
In the first part he travels south with his wife Jacquie Durrell and two other female companions to the town of Puerto Deseado in the Santa Cruz province; from here they travel to the outskirts of a remote local ranch where they then spend time filming penguins. After this, they then move north to Peninsula Valdes where they spend several weeks filming a South American fur seal colony as well as southern elephant seals. Other animals observed on the peninsula include guanacos.

In the second part, his wife Jacquie having fallen ill and returned to England, Durrell travels alone to the tropical province of Jujuy where he stays on a ranch with a couple, making friends with other locals who help him with his collecting work. He collects animals by purchasing pets from locals in the town he is based near initially, including a red-fronted Tucuman amazon named Blanco, yellow-fronted amazon parrots, grey-necked guans an armadillo and a Geoffroy's cat kitten. Later travels to a larger nearby town yield up, amongst other things an ocelot and a yellow naped macaw. Durrell gets the chance to travel into some nearby forested mountains for three days before returning to Buenos Aires with his collection; during this period he fails to capture some vampire bats, even though he offers his own toes as bait, but he succeeds in procuring a pygmy owl.

The book ends as he leaves his friends and Argentina with his collection of animals to return to the Channel Islands via ship.

== Critical reception ==
Will Cohu of The Telegraph said that while The Whispering Land wasn't Durrell's "most entertaining book", it contained "the reassuring message that life was a kind of theatre that could be played for its comedy". The Australia Women's Weekly praised Durrell, saying he had "the ability to deal as sympathetically and amusingly with humans as with animals".
