= Lee McGeorge Durrell =

American naturalist (born 1949)

Lee McGeorge Durrell MBE
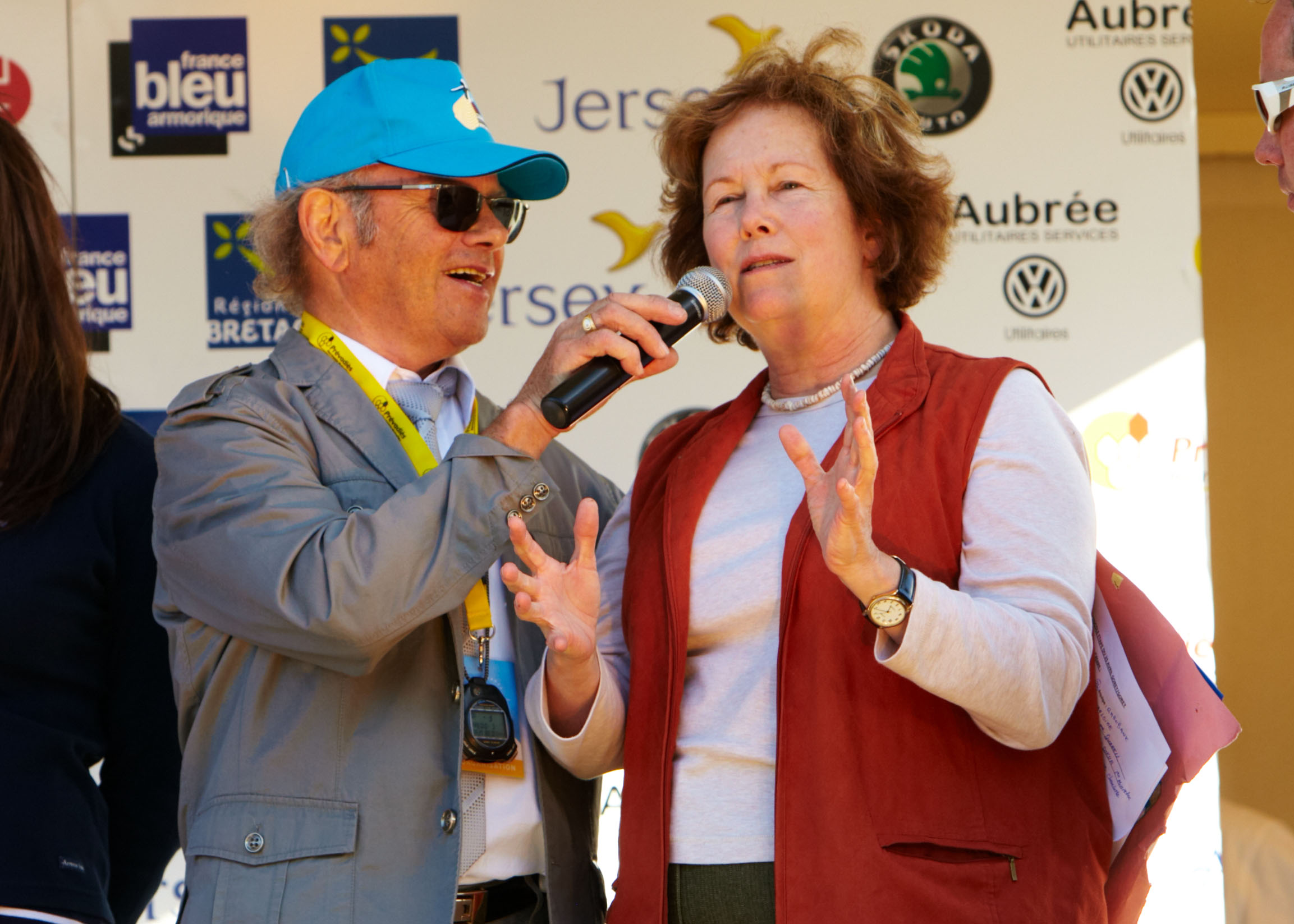
- Lee Durrell presented a gorilla mascot Gorille D'Argent to the winner of the stage of the Tour de Bretagne cycliste held in Jersey on April 25, 2010
- Born: Lee Wilson McGeorge; September 7, 1949 (age 76); Memphis, Tennessee, U.S.
- Education: Bryn Mawr College; Duke University
- Occupations: Naturalist; author; zookeeper; television presenter
- Spouse: Gerald Durrell (m. 1979; died 1995)

Lee McGeorge Durrell MBE (née McGeorge; born September 7, 1949) is an American naturalist, author, zookeeper, and television presenter. She is best known for her work at the Jersey Zoological Park in the British Channel Island of Jersey with her late husband, Gerald Durrell, and for co-authoring books with him.

== Biography ==
Lee was born in Memphis, Tennessee, and showed an interest in wildlife as a child. She studied philosophy at Bryn Mawr College near Philadelphia before enrolling in 1971 for a graduate programme at Duke University, to study animal behaviour. She conducted research for her PhD on the calls of mammals and birds in Madagascar. She met Gerald Durrell when he gave a lecture at Duke University in 1977, and married him in 1979.

Lee Durrell moved to Jersey and became involved with the Durrell Wildlife Conservation Trust (then the Jersey Wildlife Preservation Trust). She accompanied Durrell on his last three conservation missions:

- Mauritius, other Mascarene Islands and Madagascar (1982) (account in Gerald Durrell's Ark on the Move)
- Russia (1986) (account in Durrell in Russia, co-authored with Gerald Durrell)
- Madagascar (1990) (account in Gerald Durrell's The Aye-Aye and I)

She became the honorary director of the Durrell Wildlife Conservation Trust after the death of her husband in 1995. She was instrumental in getting the Jersey Wildlife Preservation Trust renamed after Gerald Durrell, on the occasion of the 40th anniversary of the Jersey Zoo. She is also a member of various expert groups on conservation, and is fondly called "Mother Tortoise" in certain areas of Madagascar due to her work with the ploughshare tortoise.

In December 2005, Lee Durrell handed over a large collection of dead animals (which had originally been collected and bred by her husband Gerald Durrell) to the National Museums of Scotland to aid genetic research of the critically rare species.

Lee acted as consultant for The Durrells, a 2016 ITV six-part dramatisation of My Family and Other Animals.

== Bibliography ==
Durrell is the author of three books:

- A Practical Guide for the Amateur Naturalist (with Gerald Durrell) (Hamish Hamilton (UK) / Alfred A. Knopf (USA), 1982) ISBN 0-241-10841-1
- Durrell in Russia (with Gerald Durrell) (MacDonald (UK) / Simon & Schuster (USA), 1986)
- State of the Ark – an atlas of conservation in action (Bodley Head, 1986) ISBN 0-370-30754-2
  - Foreword by Gerald Durrell
  - Dedicated "To GMD for his contribution to conservation, which is greater than most, because he shares his delight in the natural world so well"

She is also the editor of:

- The Best of Gerald Durrell (HarperCollins, 1996)

The companion book of a TV series documents the series where she was co-presenter:

- Ourselves and Other Animals – from the TV series with Gerald and Lee Durrell, Peter Evans (1987)

== Honours ==
Nactus serpeninsula durrelli, or Durrell's night gecko, is the Round Island race of the Serpent Island gecko, named after Gerald and Lee Durrell for their contribution to saving the gecko and Round Island fauna in general. Mauritius released a stamp depicting Durrell's night gecko.

Lee Durrell was made a Member of the Order of the British Empire by Queen Elizabeth II in the 2011 Birthday Honours.

== Filmography ==
- The Amateur Naturalist, TV series, CBC (Canada) / Channel 4 (UK) (1982)
- Ourselves & Other Animals, TV series, Primetime Television (1987)
- Durrell in Russia, TV series, Channel 4 (UK) (1986)
