= Durrell Wildlife Conservation Trust =

International conservation organization

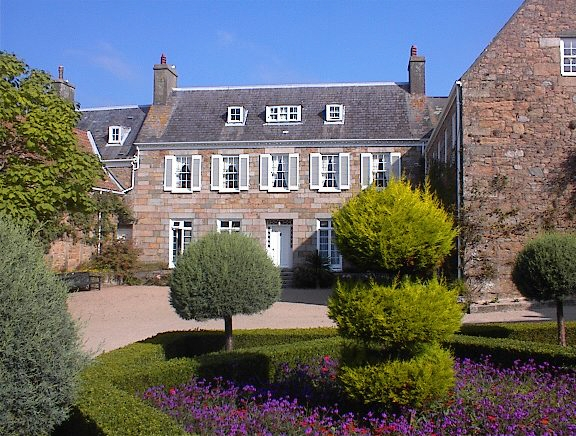
- Les Augrès Manor, Jersey – headquarters of the Durrell Wildlife Conservation Trust
- Formation: 1963; 63 years ago
- Founder: Gerald Durrell
- Founded at: Les Augrès Manor, Jersey
- Type: Conservation organization
- Patron: Princess Anne, the Princess Royal
- Honorary Director: Lee Durrell
- Website: www.durrell.org/wildlife/

Durrell Wildlife Conservation Trust is a conservation organization with a mission to save species from extinction. Gerald Durrell founded the Jersey Wildlife Preservation Trust as a charitable institution in 1963 with the dodo as its symbol. The trust was renamed Durrell Wildlife Conservation Trust in its founder's honor on 26 March 1999. Its patron is Princess Anne, the Princess Royal.

Its headquarters are at Les Augrès Manor on the isle of Jersey in the English Channel. The grounds of Les Augrès Manor form the Durrell Wildlife Park, which was originally established by Gerald Durrell in 1959 as a sanctuary and breeding center for endangered species. The zoological park was known as the Jersey Zoo at that time.

As of 2016, the zoo was home to more than one hundred species of reptiles, birds and mammals, many of which are designated as endangered in the wild.

Despite strong resistance to his ideas from much of the zoological community, in 1959 Gerald Durrell succeeded in creating his own zoo in Jersey, dedicating it to saving endangered animals from extinction. Gerald Durrell died aged 70, in January 1995. His wife Lee McGeorge Durrell succeeded him as Honorary Director of the Durrell Wildlife Conservation Trust and maintains an intense involvement in the Trust's work both in Jersey and overseas.

== Jersey ==
Durrell provides intensive hands-on management of endangered species at its Jersey headquarters and through 50 conservation programmes in 18 countries worldwide.

Durrell's headquarters in Jersey is a safe-haven for endangered animals. Here they breed and recover in numbers while keeper-conservationists observe and study them to learn more about what they will need to thrive once again in the wild.

== Durrell Wildlife Camp ==
Work began on the Durrell Wildlife Camp in early 2012. The wooded copse to the west of Les Augres Manor, bordering on the 'Lemur Lake' enclosure housing a mixed population of ring-tailed lemurs, black and white ruffed lemurs and red-fronted brown lemurs to the southwest. The lodging was named among the best overnight lodging at a zoo in the UK.

== Organic farm ==
The Trust established its own organic farm before any establishment of its kind in the UK. The Durrell Organic Farm was created in 1976 to provide the animal collection with non-chemically treated foods such as sunflowers and maize. It provides 70% of the animals' fruit, vegetable and forage needs over the year – produce which would otherwise cost the Trust well in excess of £20,000 to buy in commercially.

== Dodo Club ==
The Dodo Club was the children's wing of the Durrell Wildlife Conservation Trust. The main focus of the club was environmental awareness and citizen science projects among younger members of the Trust. The Dodo Club was so named because the logo of the trust is a dodo, chosen by the founder Gerald Durrell as a reminder of man's wanton environmental destruction.
