= Azéma =

Azéma (and variations like: Azema, Azem, Azemar) is a French surname. It derives from the pre 7th Century personal name "Aethelmaer", a compound of the elements "aethel", meaning noble, and "maer", which means famous. Notable people with the surname include:

- Agénor Azéma de Montgravier (1805–1863), French archaeologist
- Anne Azéma (born 1957), French-born soprano and artistic director
- Claude Azéma (1943–2021), French auxiliary bishop of Montpellier
- David Azéma (born 1960), French businessman
- Étienne Azéma (1776–1851), French poet, playwright, and writer of fables
- Franck Azéma (born 1971), French rugby player
- Georges Azéma (1821–1864), French historian from Réunion
- Henri Azéma (1861–1932), physician, journalist, and author from Réunion
- Jean-Baptiste Azéma (died 1745), colonial governor of Réunion
- Jean-Henri Azéma (1913–2000), French poet, father of Jean-Pierre
- Jean-Pierre Azéma (1937–2025), French historian
- Léon Azéma (1888–1978), French architect, employed as "Architect of the City of Paris"
- Lucie Azema (born 1989), French journalist, long-distance traveller, and feminist
- Manon Azem (born 1990), French actress
- Mazaé Azéma (1823–1886), French politician and doctor
- Sabine Azéma (born 1949), French film actress and director

== See also ==
- Azem (disambiguation)
