= Literature of Réunion =

Literature of Réunion is the literature of persons linked to the island of Réunion, a French overseas department in the Indian Ocean east of Madagascar. It is written in French and in Réunionnais creole as well as other languages.

== History ==
The origins of Réunionnais literature are in Réunionnais short stories and poetry, which flourished beginning in the mid-18th century. Évariste de Parny and Antoine Bertin were writers born in the island in the 18th century, but who spent most of their lives away from their birthplace. For them Réunion was a subject that represented beauty and youthful memories. This theme of exoticism was one that predominated in literature written by French-language writers from Réunion writing for a readership in France. Réunion was recounted as a lost paradise inhabited by happy natives, as in the 1924 novel Ulysse, Cafre ou L'Histoire dorée d'un Noir by Prix Goncourt winning Réunionnais authors Marius-Ary Leblond.

In the 19th century, the novel became more important; Les Marrons by Louis Timagène Houat was a major work. In French poetry, Leconte de Lisle and Léon Dierx were leading Parnassians.

A movement away from representing Réunion as a picturesque and Romantic generalised tropical paradise for the entertainment of foreign readers and towards a literature with a distinct cultural identity can be seen in the poetry of Pierre-Claude Georges-François (1869 - 1933), which moves away from classical forms of French poetry. His 1931 collection Poèmes d'Outre-Mer contained the first free verse in Réunionnais literature, daringly mixed with classical alexandrines.

Jean Albany's 1951 Zamal turns the tables on the colonial literary tradition by representing France as the "other", and introduces Creole. Slavery and the specifics of Réunionnais history, geography, fauna and flora are explored.

Boris Gamaley's Vali pour une reine morte (1973) is written in a variety of languages: French, Creole, Malagasy and other African and Indian languages to represent the linguistic and cultural influences of the island, using the languages of indigenous people, colonisers, slaves and indentured labourers.

Réunionnais literature has experienced a revival since Réunion became a departement. Créolie is a movement in Réunionnais literature.

== Major authors ==
- Gilbert Aubry
- Étienne Azéma
- Georges Azéma
- Jean-Henri Azéma
- Joseph Bédier
- Gaëlle Bélem
- Anne Cheynet
- Léon Dierx
- Joëlle Écormier
- Boris Gamaleya
- Marius-Ary Leblond
- Leconte de Lisle
- Jean Lods
- Marguerite-Hélène Mahé
- Yves Manglou
- Évariste de Parny
- Julienne Salvat
- Auguste Vinson
