= Azem (given name) =

Azem is a given name. Notable people with the name include:

- Azem Galica (1889–1924), Albanian soldier
- Azem Hajdari (1963–1998), Albanian politician
- Azem Hajdini (1924–2010), Albanian writer from Kosovo
- Azem Maksutaj (born 1975), Albanian kickboxer
- Azem Mullaliu, Albanian footballer
- Azem Shkreli (1938–1997), Albanian writer, poet, director and producer
- Azem Vllasi (born 1948), Kosovo Albanian politician

== See also ==
- Azem (disambiguation)
- Azéma
- Azeem
- Asem (given name)
