= Jean-Baptiste Azéma =

French colonial governor of Réunion (1696–1745)

Jean-Baptiste Azéma was a French administrator; he served as the governor of Réunion from May 15 to October 31, 1745. His son was the writer Étienne Azéma; other descendants have included Georges Azéma, a historian; Mazaé Azéma, a doctor; Henri Azéma, a doctor; poet Jean-Henri Azéma; and historian Jean-Pierre Azéma.
