= Manglou =

Manglou is a surname. Notable people with the surname include:

- Joël Manglou (1958–2026), Réunionese musician
- Yves Manglou (born 1943), Réunionese writer
