= Hajdini =

Hajdini is an Albanian surname. Notable people with the surname include:

- Azem Hajdini (1924–2010), Albanian writer from Kosovo
- Bledar Hajdini (born 1995), Albanian footballer from Kosovo
- Hafize Hajdini (born 1972), Albanian deputy from Kosovo
- Zenel Hajdini (1910–1942), Albanian partisan
- Lorna Hajdini, Albanian-American investment banker at JPMorgan Chase
