= Étienne Azéma =

French poet and playwright (1778–1851)

François Paul Étienne Azéma (15 January 1778 – 28 August 1851 in Saint-Denis, Réunion, on the island of Réunion) was a French poet, playwright, and writer of fables. He was a magistrate, delegated to the island by the Ministre de la Marine, and as a writer was well known for his play Médée. He was a descendant of Jean-Baptiste Azéma, a former governor of the island; he was the father of Georges Azéma, a historian, and Mazaé Azéma, a doctor. His grandson was the doctor Henri Azéma; other descendants include the poet Jean-Henri Azéma and the historian Jean-Pierre Azéma. He was made Chevalier of the Legion of Honour in 1850.

== Biography ==
A failed Magistrate before being appointed deputy attorney general and Bourbon delegate to the List of naval ministers of France, he is best known as a man of letters for his play Medea. He also produced several translations, including Virgil's Eclogues, Tibullus' Elegies, and the Song of Songs.

Grandson of Jean-Baptiste Azéma, governor of Bourbon in the mid-18th century, he was also the father of historian Georges Azéma and physician Mazaé Azéma, grandfather of physician Henri Azéma, great-grandfather of poet Jean-Henri Azéma, and great-great-grandfather of historian Jean-Pierre Azéma. He was awarded the Legion of Honour in 1850.

== Bibliography ==
- Digitized version of his work
