= Georges Azéma =

French historian

Georges Azéma (died May 9, 1864) was a French historian from Réunion. Son of the writer Étienne Azéma and brother to the doctor Mazaé Azéma, his son Henri was also a doctor; his grandfather Jean-Baptiste Azéma had briefly served as governor of Réunion; other relatives include the poet Jean-Henri Azéma and the historian Jean-Pierre Azéma.

== Biography ==
Originally from Réunion, he has mainly worked on the history of Réunion and is also the author of a famous History of Bourbon Island from 1643 to December 20, 1848. Son of Étienne Azéma, advisor to the Royal Court, then Bourbon delegate to the Minister of the Navy in April 1831, he was the father of Henri Azéma, a famous doctor from Réunion. He was clerk of the Justice of the Peace, Local government, and member of the consultative chamber of agriculture.

He is Editor-in-chief of the newspapers L'Hebdomadaire and then Le Nouveau Colon.

== Bibliography ==
- Le dictionnaire biographique de La Réunion, Sabine Deglise, Brigitte Hock-Koon, Raymonde Kissel, Michel Verguin et Mario Serviable, 1998.
