= Azem =

Azem or variation, may refer to:

== Places ==
- Ezem (Hebrew: עצם; also "Azem"), an unidentified site in the Negev of Judah toward the Edomite border, in the King James Bible spelled as "Azem" in Joshua and "Ezem" in Chronicles (4:29)
- Azem Palace (Arabic: قصر العظم), Damascus, Syria
- Azem Palace (Hama), Hama, Syria
- Azem, Andek, village in the commune of Andek of Cameroon's North-West region.
- Azem, Lomié, village in the commune of Lomié, Upper Lyong of Cameroon's East region.

== People ==
- Azem (given name)
- As'ad Pasha al-'Azem (1706–1758), Ottoman governor of Damascus
- Khaled al-Azem (1903–1965), Syrian prime minister
- Sadeq Jalal Al Azem (1934–2016), Syrian professor
- Manon Azem (born 1990), French actress
- Slimane Azem (1918–1983), Algerian singer

== Other uses ==
- Azem Alliance, an Iraqi political party

== See also ==
- Azéma
- Azeem
- Azm (disambiguation)
- Azim (disambiguation)
- Asem (disambiguation)
- Aseem
