= Jean Baptiste Gustave Planche =

French art and literary critic (1808–1857)

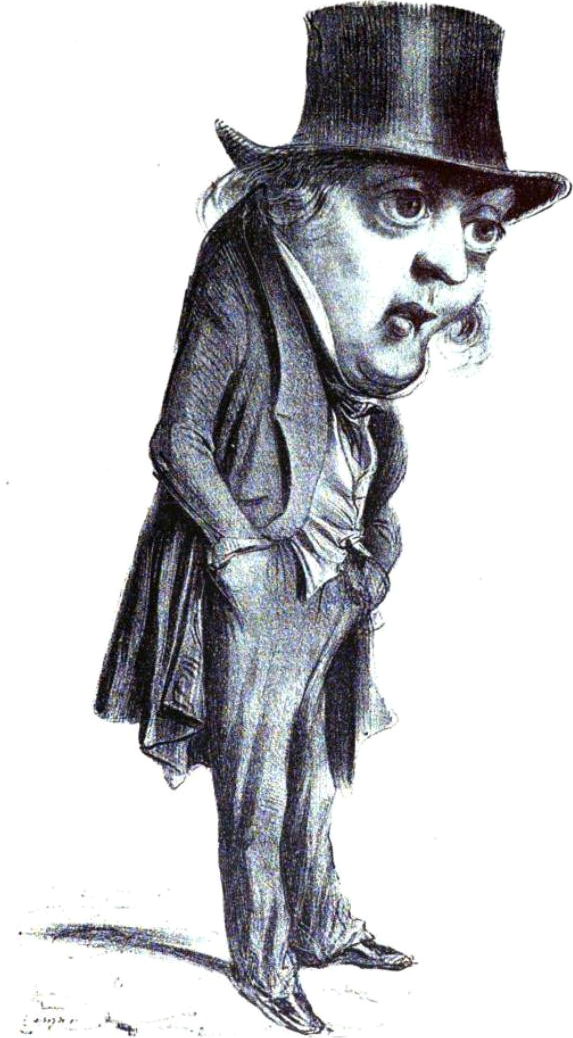
Caricature of Gustave Planche bv Benjamin.

Jean Baptiste Gustave Planche (16 February 1808 – 18 September 1857) was a French art and literary critic.

== Life and career ==
Already in his time as a medical student, Planche frequented artistic circles. This did nothing to promote the success of his studies. Around 1830, Planche was introduced by the famous writer Alfred de Vigny to François Buloz, director of the Revue des deux mondes, and contributed to this journal until 1840. In that year, his father, a rich apothecary, died, and over the few years, Planche dedicated himself to spending his 80,000 franc inheritance in Italy, his Salon reviews at the Revue des Deux Mondes taken over by Louis Peisse from 1841. He resumed his connection with the journal in 1846, a collaboration which was only terminated by his death in 1857, at the age of 49.

Planche was an honest critic and refused to accept a position from Napoleon III for fear of compromising his freedom. A fervent admirer of George Sand and Alfred de Vigny, he was contemptuous of Victor Hugo as a playwright. He characterized Hugo's earlier dramas as odes (in allusion to Hugo's book of poetry 'Odes et Ballades'), those following the drama Le Roi s'amuse as antitheses (because their characters were torn apart by conflicting tendencies), and the later ones as nothing but spectacle. His critical papers were collected under the titles: Portraits littéraires (1836-1849); Nouveaux portraits littéraires (1854); and his art criticisms in Études sur l'école française (1855).

In his writings, Planche made an attempt to reconcile modern and classical art and literature by highlighting their common preoccupation in depicting human passions. Planche liked to formulate his opinions in a sharp and precise manner. His style is witty.
