= Cheynet =

Cheynet is a French surname. Notable people with the surname include:

- Anne Cheynet (1938–2025), French poet and writer in Réunion
- Jean-Claude Cheynet (born 1947), French Byzantinist
- Jerry Cheynet, American soccer and wrestling coach
