= Kira Salak =

American writer, adventurer and journalist

- Born: September 4, 1971 (age 55); Westmont, Illinois, United States
- Writing career
- Genres: Travel writing, adventure, creative nonfiction, literary fiction, freelance magazine writing
- Subjects: Travel, political troublespots
- Notable works: White Mary, Four Corners
- Notable awards: PEN Literary Award, 2004

Kira Salak (born September 4, 1971) is an American writer, adventurer, and journalist known for her travels in Mali and Papua New Guinea. She has written two books of nonfiction and a book of fiction based on her travels and is a contributing editor at National Geographic magazine.

== Biography ==
=== Early life ===
Kira Salak was born on September 4, 1971, in Westmont, a western suburb of Chicago, Illinois. Her mother was a waitress and her father repaired mainframe computers. When Salak was 13, her parents sent her to Wayland Academy, a boarding school in Beaver Dam, Wisconsin, where she participated in cross-country activities and set a state level track record when she was 14. Though she began training for National and Olympic trials, she dropped out of the sport and decided to travel instead. Kira Salak received her B.F.A. in writing, literature and publishing from Emerson College. She received her M.F.A. in creative writing (fiction) from the University of Arizona. In 2004, she graduated from the University of Missouri, with a PhD in English; her two areas of specialization were 20th century American prose literature and travel literature.

=== Career ===
At the age of 24, Salak took a year off from graduate school to backpack around Papua New Guinea, the Pacific Island nation, and became the first American woman to cross the country. Her first book, Four Corners: One Woman's Journey into the Heart of Papua New Guinea, describes that journey. After the book was published, an editor of National Geographic Adventure magazine asked her to write for the magazine and Salak's career as a freelance writer began. Salak gained a reputation for being a tough adventurer, surviving war zones, coup attempts, and life-threatening bouts with malaria and cholera (the New York Times described her as a "tough, real life Lara Croft" and Book Magazine described her as "the gutsiest – and some say, craziest – woman adventurer of our day.")

Several of Salak's short stories have been published in journals such as Prairie Schooner, The Massachusetts Review, Quarterly West and Witness. One story, "Beheadings", about a war correspondent's search for her lost brother, is published in the anthology Best New American Voices.

According to Salak, she started writing at the age of six. Salak took a year break from writing for magazines following the passing of her brother Marc in 2005 to finish writing The White Mary, her debut novel. In an interview, she described the experience:

"I wrote the entire book not long after my brother died. It was like an obsession. I lived in a tiny basement apartment in Columbia, Missouri, unemployed for a year. I didn't tell anyone what I was doing. It was a very private experience. I almost feel that the book wasn't so much written by me, but channeled through me."

Salak now writes regularly for National Geographic Adventure, National Geographic, and other magazines about her travels to places which include Iran, Rwanda, Libya, Burma, Borneo, Uganda and Peru. In 2003, she convinced some Ukrainian gun-runners to fly her to the Democratic Republic of the Congo so she could report on the war. Salak stayed in the Congolese town of Bunia, which was taken over by child soldiers, an experience she described as "an endless stream of the worst, most inconceivable acts of inhumanity". She received a PEN literary award for her article about that experience. Her articles have also appeared in publications that include the New York Times Magazine, Travel & Leisure, The Washington Post, and Backpacker, and her work has appeared five times in Best American Travel Writing. Her fiction was selected for Best New American Voices (judged by Charles Baxter). Her fiction and nonfiction have appeared in various anthologies, including Adrenaline 2002: The Year's Best Stories of Adventure and Survival, The Best Women's Travel Writing, and Nixon Under the Bodhi Tree and Other Works of Buddhist Fiction.

== Awards ==
- Salak received the PEN Award for journalism in 2004 and has appeared five times in Best American Travel Writing.
- In 2005, the National Geographic Society awarded Salak with an Emerging Explorer Award.
- She has been awarded two Lowell Thomas Gold Awards for Best Foreign Article and Environmental Reporting.
- She has been awarded the AWP/ Prague Fellowship Award in creative nonfiction.

== Accomplishments ==
- Kira Salak is described by the National Geographic Society's website as being the "first documented person to kayak solo 966 kilometres (600 mi) down the Niger river" and by the New York Times as "a real-life Lara Croft".
- Salak has been selected by the Library of Congress for its "Women Who Dare" publications, which highlight the world's top women explorers and leaders.
- She was the first woman to cross Papua New Guinea, following the route taken by Australian patrol officer Ivan Champion in 1927.
- First person to kayak up the Niger River

== Media ==
Salak was profiled on the CBS Evening News. She has appeared on the CBC's prime-time news show, The Hour with George Stroumboulopoulos. She has been profiled in: The New York Times Book Review, Glamour, Vogue, The Observer, The Times, NY Post, Travel & Leisure, National Geographic, Book Magazine, National Geographic Adventure.

== Books ==
- Four Corners: A Journey into the Heart of Papua New Guinea, National Geographic Books, 2004: an account of her journey across Papua New Guinea, retracing the 1927 route of explorer Ivan Champion.
- The Cruelest Journey: Six Hundred miles to Timbuktu, National Geographic Books, 2004: an account of her 600-mile journey down the Niger River from Old Segou, Mali, to Timbuktu, following the route taken by the explorer Mungo Park.
- The White Mary, Henry Holt & Co., 2008: a novel concerning a traumatised war reporter, Marika Vecera, who embarks on a journey into Papua New Guinea to investigate a mysterious letter claiming that a Pulitzer-winning journalist, generally reported as having committed suicide, has been seen alive in a remote jungle there.

== See also ==
- List of female adventurers
