= Institut d'histoire du temps présent =

One of the Research units of the French CNRS

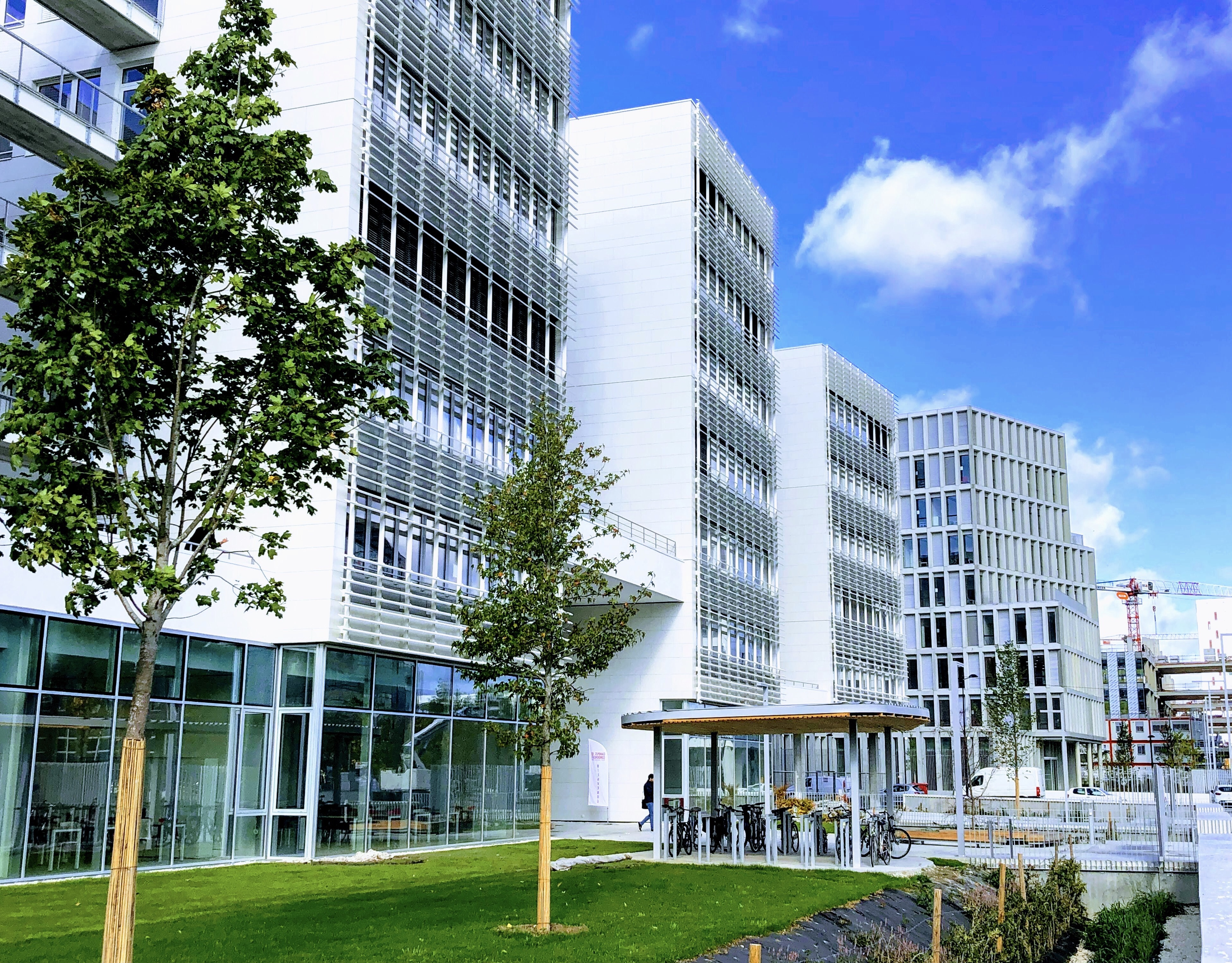
- Condorcet campus, research building South where the IHTP is centred
- Abbreviation: IHTP
- Formation: 1978
- Type: Research unit within French National Centre for Scientific Research
- Purpose: to research Contemporary history, authoritarianism, totalitarianism and colonialism and to teach
- Headquarters: UMR 8244 CNRS/PARIS 8, Campus Condorcet 14, cours des Humanités, 93322 Aubervilliers cedex Greater Paris
- Region served: France and international fora
- Members: research academics
- Director: Christian Delage
- Main organ: CNRS and University of Paris 8
- Parent organization: French National Centre for Scientific Research
- Website: http://www.ihtp.cnrs.fr

The Institut d’histoire du temps présent, also known as IHTP (English: Institute of the history of the current age), is a French research unit within the CNRS. Since September 2019 IHTP has been located on the Condorcet campus of the Paris 8 University Vincennes-Saint-Denis at Aubervilliers. IHTP focuses on the phenomenon of war in the 20th-century and on systems of political domination such as authoritarianism, totalitarianism and colonialism. It also examines the cultural history of contemporary societies and the epistemology of present-day history in terms of its relationship to the past through the specific medium of memory, witness and the role of historians amidst population centres.

== History ==
It owes its foundation in 1978 to historian François Bédarida and was formally inaugurated in 1980. In 2016 it was constituted as a UMR and was attached to Paris 8 University Vincennes-Saint-Denis when it absorbed the former Comité d'histoire de la Seconde Guerre mondiale (CHSGM), dating back to 1951. Its membership consists of specialist researchers into World War II and those analysing particular themes of contemporary history. It is headed as of 2014 by the historian Christian Delage.

== Research areas ==
Aside from conducting direct projects into recent and current history, it serves as a hub for several national and international research networks. Its laboratory holds a library comprising monographs, periodicals, oral and written archives, devoted to the Second world war, to decolonization and to spoken history. In 2019 the IHTP collections were integrated with the major documentary holdings of the Condorcet campus.

== Staffing ==
IHTP teams are led by CNRS researchers who include Christian Ingrao, Malika Rahal, Henry Rousso, Peter Schöttler and Nicolas Werth.

=== Directors ===
- 1978-1990 : François Bédarida
- 1990-1994 : Robert Frank
- 1994-2005 : Henry Rousso
- 2006-2008 : Fabrice d'Almeida
- 2008-2013 : Christian Ingrao
- Depuis 2014 : Christian Delage

== See also ==
- British Library Sound Archive
- Department of War Studies, King's College London
- Economic and Social Research Council
- Institut für Zeitgeschichte
- National Child Development Study
- NIOD Institute for War, Holocaust and Genocide Studies
