= Valerie Toranian =

French journalist

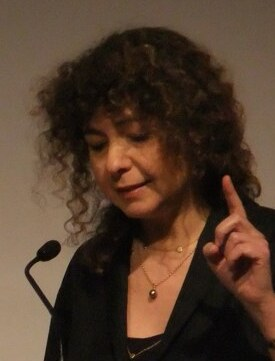
- Born: 1962 (age 63–64); Suresnes, France
- Occupation: Journalist
- Known for: Editor-in-chief of French-language Elle

Valerie Toranian (born 1962) is a French journalist and the editor-in-chief of the fashion magazine Elle in France. She is also the founder of Nouvelles d'Arménie, a French-Armenian journal. She is the head of the Elle Foundation in France and the general manager of the Revue des deux Mondes.

== Life and career ==
Toranian was born in Suresnes, Paris, to a French mother from Normandy and an Armenian father. Her father's family fled the Armenian genocide and settled in Marseille. Valerie's mother was a teacher who taught Latin, French, and Greek.

In 1983, Toranian started her career as a freelance writer and ultimately acquiring a position as a freelance writer for Elle's beauty department. She officially began working for Elle in 1994 and was promoted to deputy editor of the fashion department in 1996. Toranian eventually became managing editor and then vice-president of Elle until 2002, when she became editor-in-chief.

In 1991, Valerie Toranian, along with her husband Ara Toranian, co-founded an Armenian journal called Nouvelles d'Arménie.

In 2004, she became the vice-president of the Elle Foundation, which supports and sponsors women around the world. She was named president of the foundation in June 2010. In the same year, she released a novel titled Pour en Finir avec la Femme (English: To Do Away with the Woman), which explores issues concerning feminism. An advocate for women's rights, Toranian has hosted several conferences and events, including a Women's Forum held annually in Deauville, France.

In December 2014, Toranian became the general director of the Revue des deux Mondes, a French-language monthly literary magazine. In 2015, she released a novel about the Armenian Genocide, titled L'Etrangère (English: The Stranger).

== Personal life ==
Valerie Toranian met her first husband, Ara Toranian, at a local Armenian school. They have two sons. After their divorce, she married Franz-Olivier Giesbert, a journalist and television host.
