= Claude Azéma =

French priest (1943–2021)

- Auxiliary Bishop of Montpellier
- Church: Catholic Church
- Diocese: Archdiocese of Montpellier
- Installed: 22 March 2003
- Term ended: 5 July 2018

Orders
- Ordination: 29 June 1969
- Consecration: 31 August 2003 by Guy Thomazeau

Personal details
- Born: 5 July 1943; Vailhauquès, France
- Died: 6 September 2021 (aged 78); Montpellier, France

Claude Azéma (5 July 1943 – 6 September 2021) was a French Roman Catholic prelate. He was auxiliary bishop of Montpellier from 2003 to 2018. He was born in Vailhauquès.
