= Francis Charmes =

French journalist, diplomat, civil servant, politician and academician

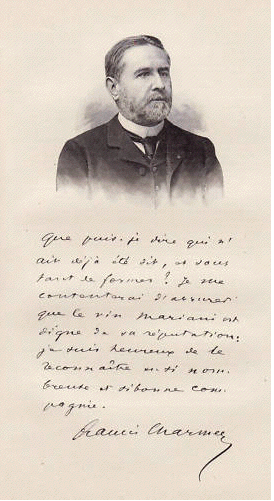

Marie François, known as Francis Charmes (21 April 1848, château de Baradel, Aurillac, Cantal – 4 January 1916, Paris) was a French journalist, diplomat, civil servant, politician and academician.

== Biography ==
Charmes was educated at Aurillac, and afterwards at the lycées of Clermont-Ferrand and Poitiers, subsequently entering journalism. He rapidly made a mark as a writer, and in 1872 became editor of the Journal des Débats, where he remained until 1880, returning to it from 1889 to 1907. His political writings created much interest, and in 1880 the French government appointed him to the post of assistant director of the political department of the Foreign Office. In 1885 he became head of the department, and remained in the Foreign Office until 1889.

From 1881 to 1885 and again from 1889 to 1898 he represented Cantal in the Chamber of Deputies, and in 1900 he became a senator. Charmes is, however, best known for his connexion with the Revue des Deux Mondes. In 1893 he began his political writings in the Revue, and in 1907 became its editor. He takes a high place among the journalists of the Third Republic, and his articles and studies, both literary and political, in the Journal des Débats and Revue des Deux Mondes were one of the features of French literary history during the last years of the 19th century.

He was an Officer of the Légion d'honneur.

== Selected bibliography ==
- Études historiques et diplomatiques (1893)
- Les Questions actuelles de politique étrangère en Europe (1907)
- L'Allemagne contre l'Europe, la guerre (1914-1915) (1915)
