= The White Mary =

The White Mary, published in 2008, is travel writer Kira Salak's third book and her first novel.

== Plot ==
For years, war reporter Marika Vecera has risked her life, traveling to the world’s most dangerous places to offer a voice for the oppressed and suffering. But one day her luck nearly runs out: while covering the genocide in war-ravaged Congo. Rebel soldiers kidnapped her, and she barely escaped with her life. Marika makes it home to Boston, where she left behind a burgeoning relationship with Seb, a psychologist who has offered her glimpses of a better world. However, her chance for a loving, stable relationship with him is put to the test as she vows to continue her risky work at any cost.

It isn’t long before Marika receives devastating news: Robert Lewis, a famous, Pulitzer-winning journalist has committed suicide. She always deeply admired Lewis for his courageous reporting on behalf of the world’s forgotten. Wanting to understand what could have caused him to take his own life, she stops her magazine work to write his biography. In the course of her research, a curious letter arrives from a missionary who claims to have seen Lewis alive in a remote jungle in Papua New Guinea. The information shocks Marika. She wonders if Lewis is really dead.

Marika is determined to find out if the letter is true. She leaves Seb to embark on her hardest journey yet, through one of the most exotic and unknown places on earth. She must rely on the skills and wisdom of a mysterious witchdoctor Tobo, who introduces her to a magical world ruled by demons and spirits, and governed by strict taboos. Marika’s quest for Robert Lewis carries her not only into the heart of New Guinea but into the depths of the human soul. What she learns about herself and life will change her forever.
