= Nicolas Bouvier =

Swiss writer, artist and traveller

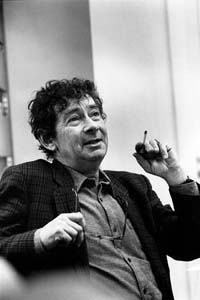
- Nicolas Bouvier
- Born: 6 March 1929; Grand-Lancy
- Died: 17 February 1998 (aged 68)
- Occupations: Writer, picture editor and photographer

Nicolas Bouvier (6 March 1929 in Grand-Lancy – 17 February 1998) was a 20th-century Swiss traveller, writer, picture editor and photographer. He studied in Geneva in the 1950s and lived there later between his travels.

== Life ==
Bouvier was born at Grand-Lancy near Geneva, the youngest of three children. He grew up in "a Huguenot milieu, rigorous and enlightened at the same time, intellectually very open, but where the entire emotional aspect of existence was strictly monitored." He passed his childhood in a house where, in his words, "the paper-cutter counted for more than the bread-knife", a double reference to his librarian father ("one of the most amiable beings I should ever have met") and his mother, "the most mediocre cook west of Suez". He grew up indifferent to gastronomy and a hardy traveller as well as an avid reader. Between the ages of six and seven, he devoured Jules Verne, Curwood, Stevenson, Jack London and Fenimore Cooper. "At eight years, I traced with my thumbnail the course of the Yukon in the butter of my toast. Already waiting for the world: to grow up and clear off."

From 1946, various escapades (Bourgogne, Tuscany, Provence, Flanders, the Sahara, Lapland, Anatolia) got him started on the path of the voyager. Nevertheless, he enrolled at the University of Geneva in the faculty of Letters and Law, indulged an interest in Sanskrit and medieval history, and thought about pursuing a doctorate (which he did not in the end take up) doing a comparative study of Manon Lescaut and Moll Flanders.

His travels all over the world incited him to recount his experiences and adventures, the most famous works being L'Usage du monde and Le Poisson-scorpion. His work is marked by a commitment to report what he sees and feels, shorn of any pretence of omniscience, leading often to an intimacy bordering on the mystical. His journey from Geneva to Japan was in many ways prescient of the great eastward wave of hippies that occurred in the sixties and seventies - slow, meandering progress in a small, iconic car, carefully guarded idiosyncrasy, a rite of passage. Yet, it differs in that the travelogues this journey inspired contain deep reflections on man's intimate nature, written in a style very much aware and appreciative of the traditions and possibilities of the language he uses. (He wrote mainly in French, though he does mention writing a series of travel articles in English for a local journal during his stay in Ceylon.)

"To reach the heart of this man, one must return to the slim volume that contains all his poems," wrote Bertial Galand, Bouvier's editor. The work in question is Le dehors et le dedans, a collection of texts written for the most part on the road and published for the first time in 1982. This is the only book of poetry by Bouvier, who nevertheless said in an interview, "Poetry is more necessary to me than prose because it is extremely direct, brutal - full-contact!"

At the end of the 1950s, the World Health Organization asked him to find images on the eye and its diseases. Thus Bouvier discovered, "through the chances of life", his profession of "image searcher," which perhaps appealed to him because "images, like music, speak a universal language," as suggested by Pierre Starobinski in his preface to Le Corps, miroir du Monde - voyage dans le musée imaginaire de Nicolas Bouvier. Another posthumous work, Entre errance et éternité, offers a poetic look at the mountains of the world. The iconographer commented on some of his finds in a series of articles for Le Temps stratégique, collected together as Histoires d'une image.

That Nicolas Bouvier lived in movement does not mean that he did not enjoy himself in Switzerland. Quite the contrary: he was involved in various activities, creating the progressive Gruppe Olten with Frisch and Dürrenmatt, after having left the Swiss Writers Society, which he found too conservative. In L'Echappée Belle, éloge de quelques pérégrins he celebrates a Switzerland "rarely spoken of: a Switzerland in movement, a nomadic Switzerland." The Swiss, sedentary? "You must be joking! In fact, the Swiss are the most nomadic people in Europe. Every sixth Swiss has chosen to live his life abroad." Reasonable? "It remains to be seen! Under the ordered surface, the varnish of the Helvetic 'as it should be,' I sense the passage of great strata of the irrational, a deaf fermentation, so present in the first thrillers of Dürrenmatt, in Fritz Zorn's Mars, a latent violence that, to me, renders this country bizarre and engaging." The traveller-writer, a close friend of Ella Maillart, thus sees in the history of his country "a constant of nomadism, of exile, of quest, of anxiety, a manner of not staying in place that have profoundly marked our mentality and, therefore, our literature. There has been, for two thousand years, a Switzerland, vagabond, pilgrim, often forced on to the road by poverty, and of which we speak all too rarely."

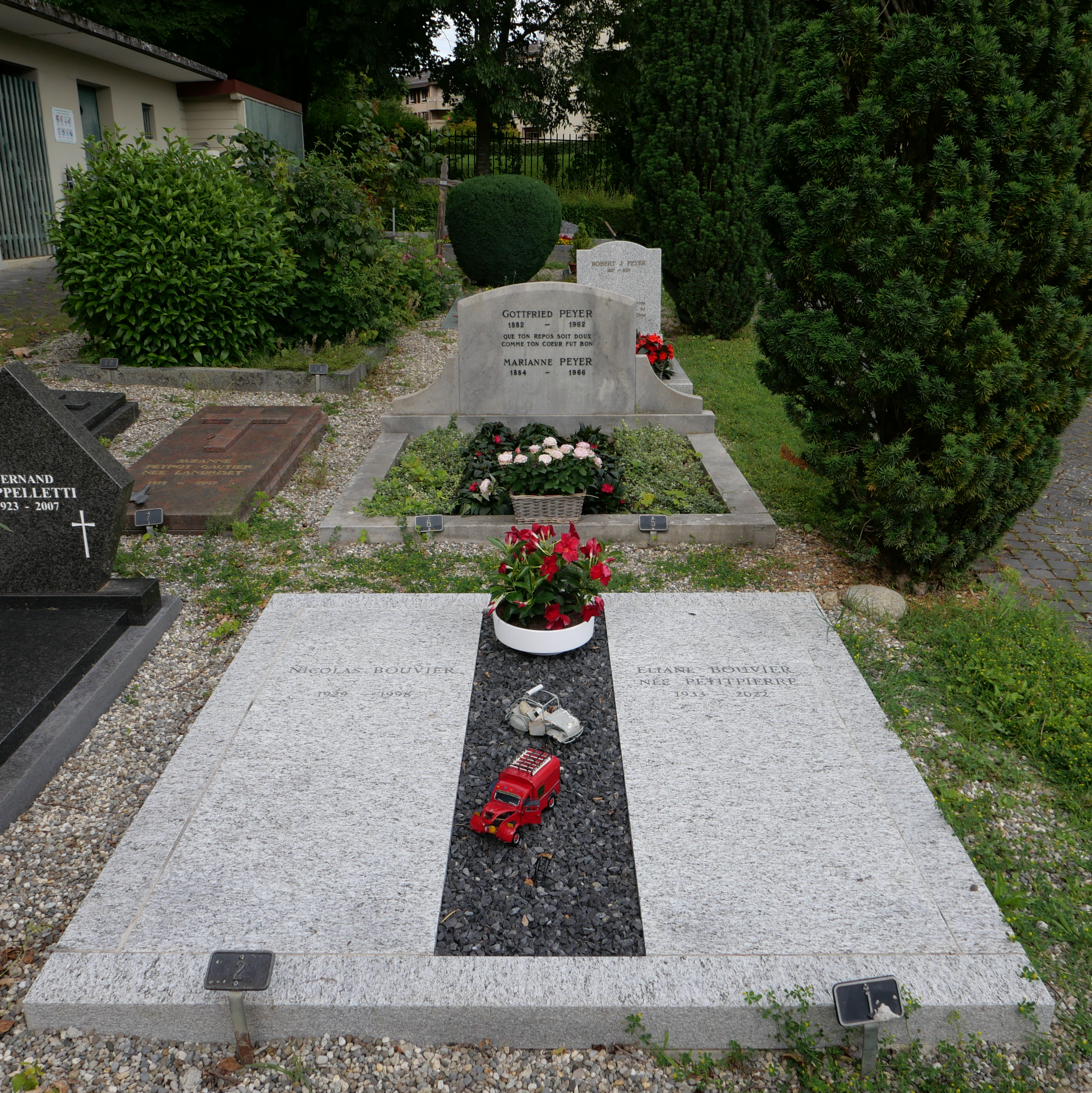
The grave in 2024.

Bouvier received the Prix de la Critique (1982), the Prix des Belles Lettres (1986), and in 1995 the Grand Prix Ramuz for the entirety of his work. On 17 February 1998, suffering from cancer, Nicolas Bouvier died, in the words of his wife Eliane (1933–2022), "in complete serenity." A few months earlier, he had written these words:

"Henceforth it is in another elsewhere / that reveals not its name / in other whispers and other plains / that you must / lighter than thistle / disappear in silence / returning thus to the winds of the road" (Le dehors et le dedans, "Morte saison'").

Bouvier found his final resting place at the New Cemetery of Cologny. His wife Eliane, who was a daughter of top-politician Max Petitpierre and a niece of philosopher Denis de Rougemont, was buried at his site. The grave features two model cars of the legendary Citroën 2CV, which represent his travels around the world.

== Major voyages ==
=== Yougoslavia to Khyber Pass (1953–1954) ===
Without even waiting for the results of his exams (he would learn in Bombay that he had obtained his Licence in Letters and Law), he left Switzerland in June 1953 with his friend Thierry Vernet in a Fiat Topolino. First destination: Yugoslavia. The voyage lasted till December 1954. The voyage led the two men to Turkey, to Iran and to Pakistan, Thierry Vernet leaving his friend at the Khyber Pass. Bouvier continued alone. Bouvier recounted the journey in L'Usage du monde, published in English translation as "The Way of the World". The pilgrim finds the words to express himself, and his feet follow them faithfully: "A journey does not need reasons. Before long, it proves to be reason enough in itself. One thinks that one is going to make a journey, yet soon it is the journey that makes or unmakes you." The book was described as a voyage of self-discovery '"on the order of Robert M. Pirsig’s Zen and the Art of Motorcycle Maintenance".

=== Sri Lanka/Ceylon (1955) ===
With intermittent company, Bouvier crossed Afghanistan, Pakistan and India before reaching Ceylon. Here he lost his footing: the solitude and the heat floored him. It took him seven months to leave the island and almost thirty years to free himself of the weight of this adventure with the writing of Le Poisson-scorpion (published 1981, translated into English as The Scorpion-Fish). It ends on a quote from Louis-Ferdinand Céline: "The worst defeat of all is to forget and especially the thing that has defeated you."

=== Japan (1955–1956) ===
After Ceylon, he left for another island: Japan. He found a country in the throes of change and he continued to visit Japan over the subsequent decades. These experiences led to Japon, which would become Chroniques Japonaises after a third sojourn in 1970 and a complete re-edition. It was published in English in 1992 as The Japanese Chronicles. In this book, he blended his personal experiences of Japan with Japanese history and rewrote a Japanese history from a Western perspectives. "Japan," he says, "is a lesson in economy. It is not considered good form to take up too much space."

=== Ireland (1985) ===
Building on a report for a journal in the Aran Islands, Bouvier wrote Journal d'Aran et d'autres lieux, a tale of travel that slips at times into the supernatural, the voyager suffering from typhoid. His appreciation of the air of the Irish islands is described as that which "dilates, tonifies, intoxicates, lightens, frees up animal spirits in the head who give themselves over to unknown but amusing games. It brings together the virtues of champagne, cocaine, caffeine, amorous rapture and the tourism office makes a big mistake in forgetting it in its prospectuses."

== Works ==
- L'Usage du monde, 1963, translated as The Way of the World, Eland 2007
- Japon, éditions Rencontre, Lausanne, 1967
- Chronique japonaise, 1975, éditions Payot, 1989, translated as The Japanese Chronicles, Mercury 1992, Eland 2008
- Vingt-cinq ans ensemble, histoire de la télévision Suisse Romande, éditions SSR, 1975
- Le Poisson-scorpion, 1982, éditions Gallimard, Folio, 1996, translated as The Scorpion-Fish, Carcanet 1987, Eland 2014
- Les Boissonas, une dynastie de photographes, éditions Payot, Lausanne, 1983
- Journal d'Aran et d'autres lieux, éditions Payot, 1990
- L'Art populaire en Suisse, 1991
- Le Hibou et la baleine, éditions Zoé, Genève, 1993
- Les Chemins du Halla-San, éditions Zoé, Genève, 1994
- Comment va l'écriture ce matin?, éditions Slatkine, Genève, 1996
- La Chambre rouge et autres textes, éditions Métropolis, 1998
- Le Dehors et le dedans, éditions Zoe, Genève, 1998
- Entre errance et éternité, éditions Zoé, Genève, 1998
- Une Orchidée qu'on appela vanille, éditions Métropolis, Genève, 1998
- La Guerre à huit ans, éditions Mini Zoé, Genève, 1999
- L'Échappée belle, éloge de quelques pérégrins, éditions Métropolis, Genève, 2000
- Histoires d'une image, éditions Zoé, Genève, 2001
- L'Œil du voyageur, éditions Hoëbeke, 2001
- Charles-Albert Cingria en roue libre, éditions Zoé, Genève, 2005

== See also ==
- Travel writing
