= L'Usage du monde =

The Way of the World
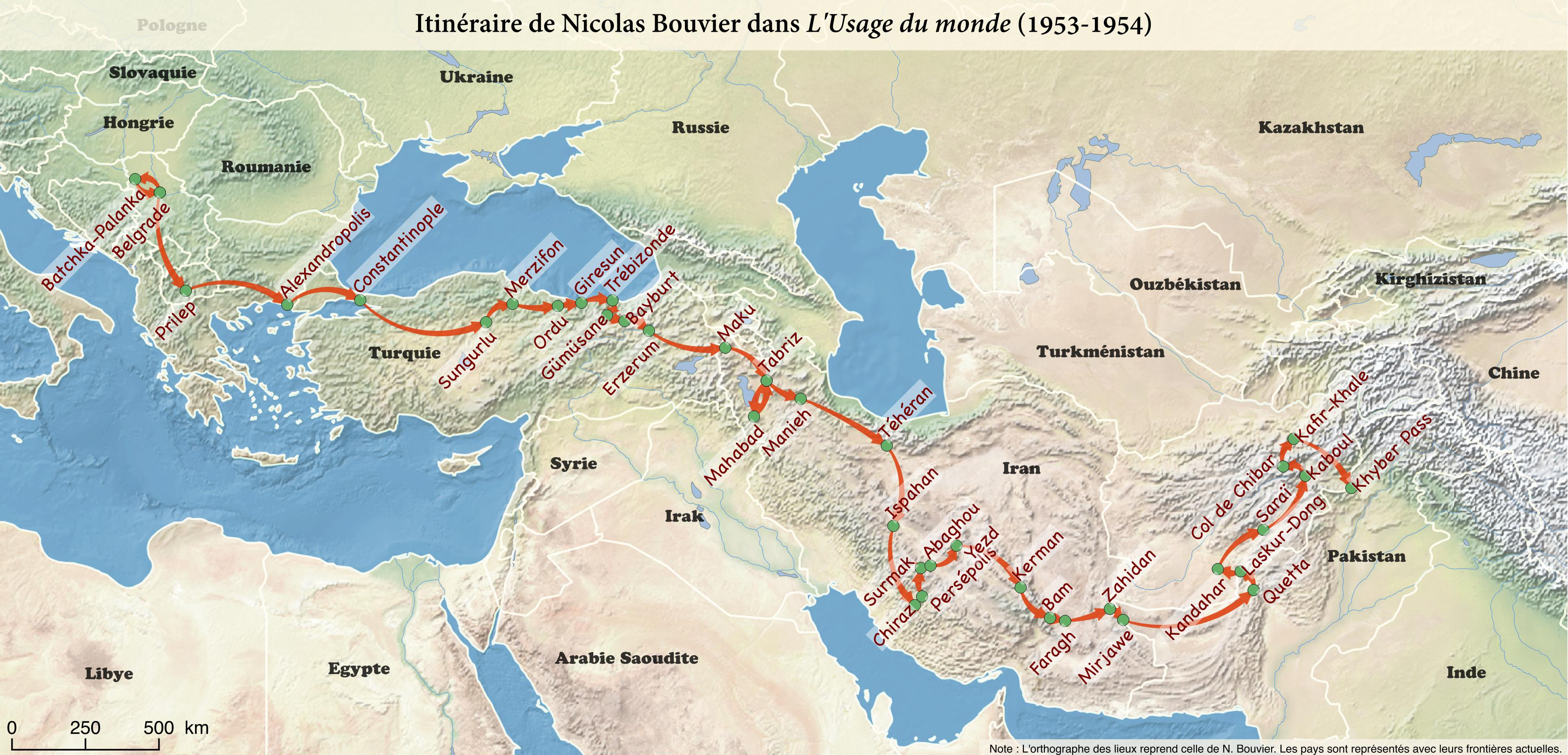
- Itinerary of the journey as told in the book
- Author: Nicolas Bouvier
- Original title: L'Usage du monde
- Translator: Robyn Marsack
- Illustrator: Thierry Vernet
- Subject: travel report
- Genre: travel literature
- Publisher: Librairie Droz - Geneva - Switzerland, Northwestern University
- Publication date: 1963
- Publication place: Switzerland
- English publication date: 1994
- Pages: 309
- ISBN: 0-910395-86-1

L'Usage du monde (English translation by Robyn Marsack as The Way of the World) is a travel literature book written by the Swiss writer Nicolas Bouvier illustrated by Thierry Vernet and first self-published in 1963 − a decade after the event − at the Librairie Droz. This work tells the story of Bouvier and Vernet's journey from Geneva to the Khyber Pass from June 1953 to December 1954, aboard a small Fiat 500 "Topolino" (the story actually begins in Travnik in July 1953). Over the years and re-editions, the book became in the last decade of 1900 a «masterpiece of French travel literature». In addition to the precise description of his journey, the author places great emphasis on the people he meets and invites the reader to marvel at the world as he strolls and to let himself be “reshaped” by the journey. These same themes will come up in several other works by Bouvier such as Chronique japonaise (Japanese chronicle), Le poisson-scorpion (The scorpion fish) or Journal d'Aran et d'autres lieux (Aran's diary and other places). In 2006, Éditions L'Âge d'Homme published, under the title Peindre, écrire chemin faisant (Painting, writing on the way)”, the correspondence that Thierry Vernet sent almost daily to his family along this journey.

== Plot ==
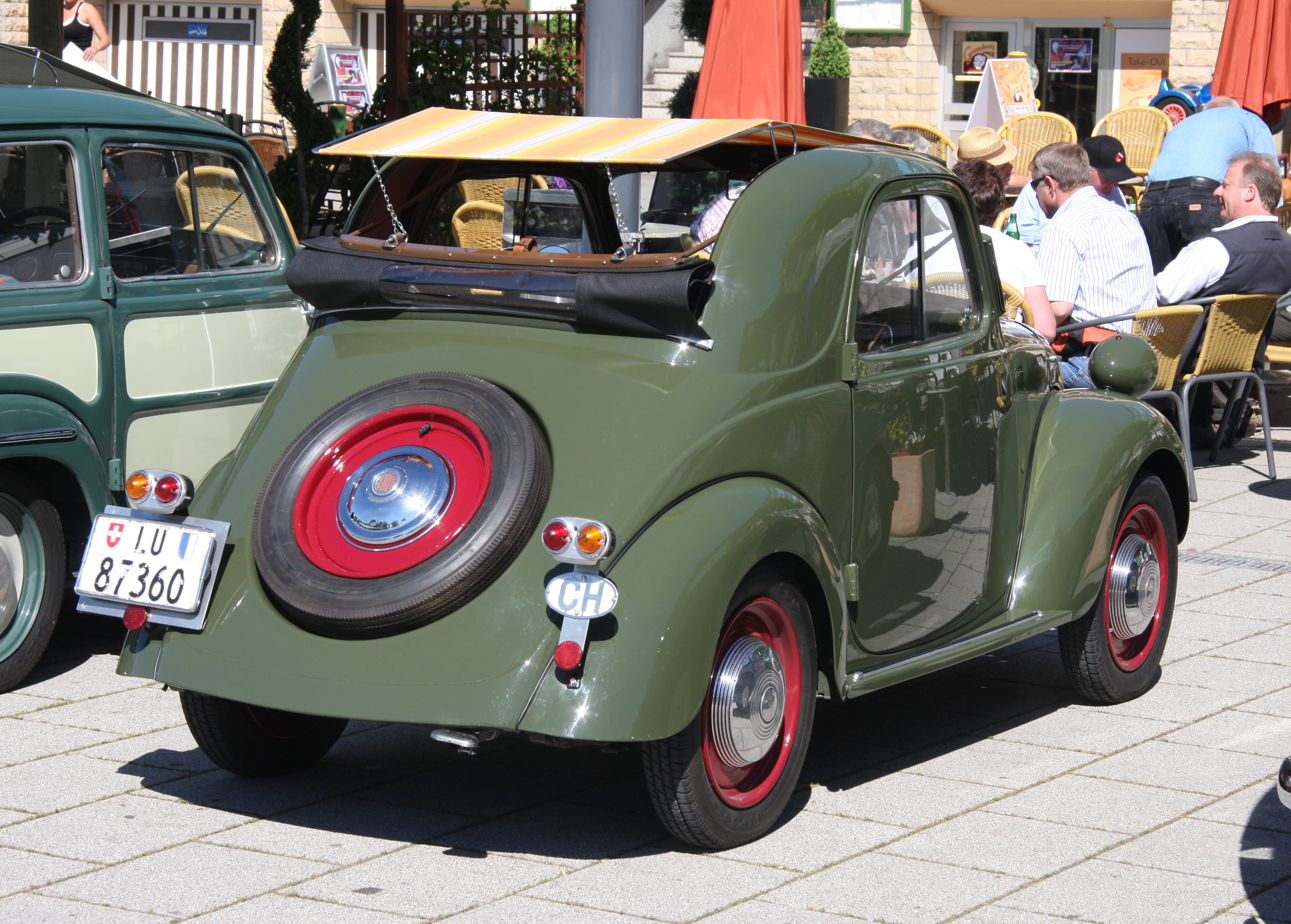
A Fiat 500 "Topolino" identical to the one used by Nicolas Bouvier and Thierry Vernet during their journey in 1953–1954, photo shot in 2009.

The book is an account of the journey made by the two friends from Yugoslavia to Afghanistan, between June 1953 and December 1954 after having received the blessing of Ella Maillart, the Swiss adventurer and travel writer. The route, made in a Fiat 500 Topolino, takes them from Belgrade to Turkey, Iran (where they spend the winter 1953–1954 in Tabriz), Pakistan (including a long stopover in Quetta), and Afghanistan. Here, in Kabul, the two friends split up: Nicolas Bouvier's story continues until Khyber Pass, while Vernet travels to Sri Lanka to meet his girlfriend Floristella. The choice of the small Topolino despite being less romantic than going on foot gives L'usage du monde its poetry and a very peculiar rithm. To earn the little money needed during the trip, Thierry Vernet sells paintings and Nicolas Bouvier writes articles for Swiss and other newspapers, gives lectures and French lessons.

== Critical reception ==
For the essayist Mona Chollet, Nicolas Bouvier shows «in this legendary book an astounding erudition for a young man of twenty-five» and «never separates the sublime from the trivial, the poetic from the pragmatic, the intellectual life from life itself.»

The academic Rachel Bouvet believes that «what catches the attention is the countless number of encounters, portraits, descriptions of manners and customs. Human disparity is undoubtedly one of the key elements of the story». According to Bouvet the posture of Nicolas Bouvier traveler is part of geopoetics, «the field of research and creation founded by the Scottish writer Kenneth White».

James Owen on the Telegraph states: «The Way of the World is a masterpiece which elevates the mundane to the memorable and captures the thrill of two passionate and curious young men discovering both the world and themselves.» While Rory MacLean on The Guardian states that «On every page a gem or two glitters, and the accumulation of colour, detail and inspired metaphor produce an intensely hypnotic effect.»

== Editions ==
=== in French ===
- L’usage du monde (1963). 376 pages, 48 drawings by Thierry Vernet, introduction Alain Dufour; choix de lettres de Nicolas Bouvier, 1951–1963, Droz, edition 1999
- L'usage du monde (1963). 364 pages, Payot (pocket), 1992
- L'usage du monde (1963). 418 pages, illustrations by Thierry Vernet, Petite Bibliothèque Payot/Voyageurs, 2001 - ISBN 978-2-228-89401-2
- Œuvres, (2004). 1428 pages, 252 illustrations, Gallimard, collection Quarto
- L'usage du monde (1963)- Paris, La Découverte, 1985, 2014.

=== in English ===
- "The Way of the World" (1994) 309 pages - illustrations by Thierry Vernet - Robyn Marsack (Translator), Patrick Leigh Fermor (Introduction) - ISBN 978-0-910395-87-8
- "The Way of the World: Two men in a car from Geneva to the Khyber Pass" (2007) 309 pages - illustrations by Thierry Vernet - Robyn Marsack (Translator) - ISBN 978-0-907871-53-8 - Eland Publishing
- "The Way of the World" (2009) 336 pages - illustrations by Thierry Vernet - Robyn Marsack (Translator), Patrick Leigh Fermor (Introduction) - ISBN 978-1-59017-322-0 New York Review Books -

== Bibliography ==
- Salazar-Ferrer, Olivier (2015). L'Usage du monde de Nicolas Bouvier L'Usage du monde de Nicolas Bouvier, ACEL – Le cippe, 2015, 128 p. In French
- Baudelle, Yves; Morzewski, Christian (2018). Nicolas Bouvier - L'usage du monde, revue Roman 20-50, hors série n°8, - Presses universitaires du Septentrion - ISBN 978-2-908481-93-8. In French.
