= Azm =

Azm, AZM or variants may refer to:

== People ==
- Al-Azm family, prominent Syrian family
  - As'ad Pasha al-Azm (c. 1706 – 1758), governor of Damascus
  - Sulayman Pasha al-Azm (died 1743), governor of Damascus
  - Ibrahim Pasha al-Azm (died 1746), governor of Tripoli and Sidon
  - Haqqi al-Azm (1864–1955), former prime minister of Syria
  - Khalid al-Azm (1903–1965), five times prime minister of Syria
  - Sadiq Jalal al-Azm (1934–2016), Syrian philosophy professor
- AZM (wrestler) (born 2002), Japanese professional wrestler

== Places ==
- Azm Palace, Damascus, Syria
- Azm Palace (Hama), Syria

== Other uses ==
- Project Azm, a cancelled Pakistani aircraft project
- Old Azerbaijani manat, a former currency of Azerbaijan
- Ipalapa Amuzgo, ISO 639 language code azm, a dialect of Amuzgo
- Azinphos-methyl, an organophosphate insecticide
- American Zionist Movement, the American federation of Zionist groups

== See also ==
- Azem (disambiguation)
- Azim (disambiguation)
