= The Eye of Vichy =

- DVD cover
- Directed by: Claude Chabrol
- Written by: Jean-Pierre Azéma; Robert Paxton
- Produced by: Jean-Pierre Ramsay-Levi
- Narrated by: Michel Bouquet; Brian Cox
- Edited by: Frédéric Lossignol; Stéphanie Louis
- Production companies: Canal+ Centre National de la Cinématographie (CNC); Délégation à la Mémoire et à l'Information Historique; FIT Productions; Institut National de l'Audiovisuel (INA); La Sofica Bymages; Ministre de la Culture et de l'Éducation Nationale; Secrétariat d'État aux Anciens Combattants et Victimes de Guerre; Sylicone; TF1 Films Production
- Distributed by: BAC Films
- Release date: 10 March 1993
- Running time: 110 minutes
- Country: France

The Eye of Vichy (French: "L'Œil de Vichy") is a 1993 French documentary film directed by Claude Chabrol. It consists of a selection in chronological order of authentic footage, mostly newsreels and documentaries, shown on cinema screens in France between 1940 and 1944. Intertitles or a narrator occasionally add linking or supplementary information. The bulk of the material was produced under the Vichy régime and the aim of the film is to show the worldview which the collaborationist government of Pétain promoted to its population.

== Themes ==
The main messages conveyed by this Vichy propaganda were:

- That the elderly Pétain was a father to his people, incarnating the true France and heading its legitimate government. The unnamed de Gaulle was therefore a traitor and his pretensions to lead an alternative government false.
- That the destiny of France lay in co-operation with the German occupiers to build a new Europe which excluded Britain and the US to the west and the USSR to the east.
- That collaboration with Nazi Germany included supplying workers of both sexes to its factories and sending soldiers to fight communism on the Eastern Front.
- That the German armed forces were France's protectors against the Western Allies, who only brought destruction by bombing and invasion. Coverage of Anglo-American attacks emphasised the civilians killed and dwellings demolished.
- That after resounding victories at El Alamein and Stalingrad, the invincible German forces made strategic withdrawals from North Africa and Russia.
- That those who actively resisted the security forces of Vichy and the German occupiers were terrorists to be exterminated and that for every German killed innocent hostages would be shot.
- That Jews were aliens and enemies, to be rounded up and deported. Their grim fate once transported east was not explained.

== Critical reception ==
From Vincent Canby of The New York Times:

The Chabrol film is something else: a documentary composed almost entirely of cheery newsreels and propaganda films turned out in France during the occupation. The film has been criticized for not showing what was really going on at the time the newsreels and propaganda films were made, though Mr. Chabrol's own voice-over narration bridges most of those gaps.

From TV Guide:

This documentary from director Claude Chabrol demonstrates how the old-fashioned compilation can still have a dramatic impact when skillfully edited with a carefully crafted narration. Using Vichy's own newsreels and songs, The Eye of Vichy shows the blend of opportunism and native fascism that made up the collaborationist government, undercut by brief references to the items not caught by official cameramen at staged events.

== See also ==
- Vichy France
