= Créolie =

Literary movement in Réunion

Créolie is a musical and literary movement in Réunion. The term was first used in 1970, and was adapted by Catholic bishop Gilbert Aubry in 1978. It is a traditional movement which seeks to place Réunionese identity within a larger, integrated French identity. In contrast to the créolité movement, it places more focus on French folklore, and less on the history of French slavery.

== History ==
The term créolie was coined in 1970 by the poet Jean Albany, which was later adapted by Gilbert Aubry in his conference text Hymne a la Créolie (1978), given in Saint Denis; Aubry, a Catholic bishop, later wrote that his text was the "trigger" for the movement. Other prominent writers include Jean-Henri Azéma and Jean-François Samlong. Works by créolie practitioners include the poetry collection Zamal (Albany, 1951), (Note: Réunion Creole for cannabis.) the text Vavangue (Albany, 1972), (Note: The text in which he introduced the term créolie.) the music recording Chante Albany (Albany and others, 1979; English: Sing Albany), and the poetry collection Olographe (Azéma, 1978; English: Holograph). (Note: During World War II, Azéma collaborated with Vichy France after a history of supporting nationalist ideologies. He fled to Argentina in the postwar years, and later reconnected with his Réunionese identity through créolie.)

== Analysis ==
In contrast to the créolité movement, which developed some ten years after créolie was developed, créolie is a traditional, conservative, and apolitical movement. It does not seek to place Réunion Creole as the sole emancipatory language of the island or its people. The movement, through writing and song, seeks to recuperate a regional identity of France, where the individual identities of its possessions—including Réunion and its historical associations with Portugal, Spain, Madagascar, and the Indian subcontinent—are brought to the fore and integrated with a French identity into a cohesive and unitary national one. The conformist agenda of créolie is seen in the movement's combination of creole cultural traditions and French folklore, while créolité activists use the history of French slavery and traditional music. The movement, however, disavows any hereditary links between France and Réunion, instead taking an integrative approach. Its perspective of history is similar to négritude, in that créolie seeks to challenge history and come up with pride.

According to the literary scholar Françoise Lionnet, the movement ignores the value of Réunion Creole as a language, and its move toward integration is ultimately a nationalist reaction. Similarly, the French scholar Valérie Magdelaine-Andrianjafitrimo writes that the movement is a theoretical one of redemption for the Réunionese as members of a French nation-state, where creole "is no longer a patois but not yet a language".

== Notes and references ==
=== Bibliography ===
- Aubrey, Gilbert (2000). "Poésie en Créolie" [Poetry in créolie]. Pierre d'Angle (in French). 6: 123–133. doi:10.5840/pda2000610.
- Hawkins, Peter (2007). The other hybrid archipelago: Introduction to the literatures and cultures of the francophone Indian Ocean. Lanham: Lexington Books. ISBN 9780739116760.
- Jack, Belinda Elizabeth (1996). Francophone literatures: An introductory survey. Oxford University Press. ISBN 9780198715061.
- Lionnet, Françoise (1993). "Créolité in the Indian Ocean: Two models of cultural diversity". Yale French Studies (82): 101–112. doi:10.2307/2930213. ISSN 0044-0078. JSTOR 2930213.
- Magdelaine-Andrianjafitrimo, Valérie (2008). "Les littératures réunionnaises: Entre francophonie et outre-mer" [Réunionese literature: Between francophonie and overseas]. Nouvelles Études Francophones (in French). 23 (1): 52–66. ISSN 1552-3152. JSTOR 25702104.
- Prabhu, Anjali (2007). Hybridity: Limits, transformations, prospects. Albany: State University of New York Press. ISBN 9780791470428.
- Samson, Guillaume; Pitre, Shawn (2007). "Music, poetry, and the politics of identity in Réunion Island: An historical overview". Popular Music History. 2 (1): 25–48. doi:10.1558/pomh.v2i1.25. ISSN 1740-7133.
