= Marguerite-Hélène Mahé =

French novelist (1903–1996)

Marguerite-Hélène Mahé (1903–1996) was a French writer from Réunion, who is best known for her work Sortilèges créoles: Eudora ou l'île enchantée (fr), published first in 1952, serialised into three issues of Revue des Deux Mondes. It was subsequently reissued whole, twice, in 1955 and 1985. It is a pivotal work in Reunionnais literature, due to its descriptions of the lives of those enslaved on the island. It was also the first novel by a Réunionese writer to use modernism and fantasy. She also wrote an autobiography, which is as yet unpublished.
