= Lucie Azema =

French feminist travel writer

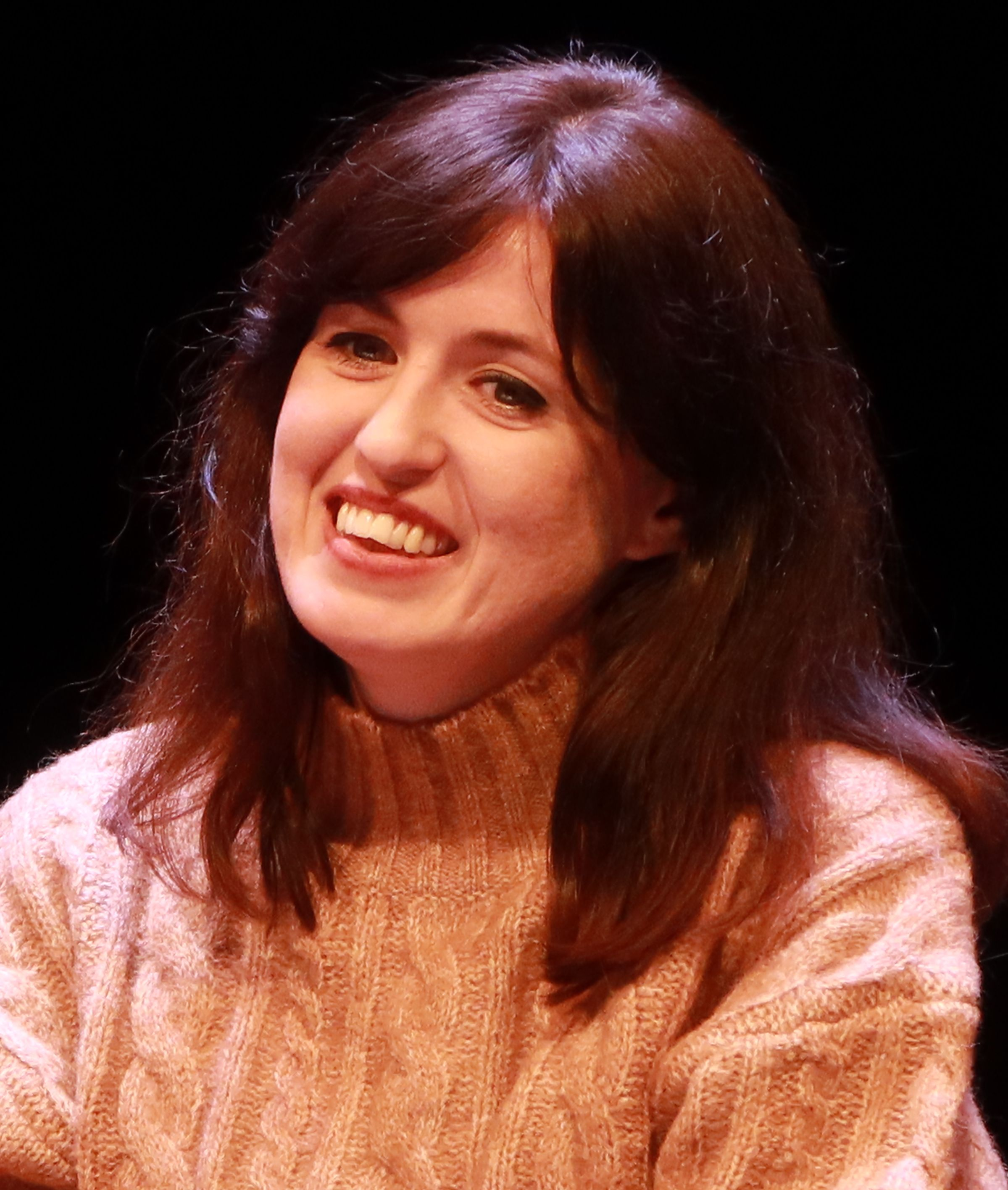
- Born: 1989 (age 36–37); France
- Occupation: Writer • journalist
- Notable work: Les femmes aussi sont du voyage

Lucie Azema (born 1989), is a French journalist, long-distance traveller, and feminist. She questions the masculine vision of adventure and travel writing.

== Early life ==
Azema was born in 1989 into a family that was not particularly well-travelled. However, she became an assiduous reader of travel writers, such as Jules Verne and Alexandra David-Néel. In 2011, she left France to study in Beirut, Lebanon. Later, she lived in India where she wrote a blog for Courrier expat, in Lebanon, and in Turkey. She moved to Iran in 2017 and as of 2023 was dividing her time between Turkey and France.

== Career ==
In 2021, Azema published Les femmes aussi sont du voyage (Women are also travellers), which has been described as a feminist manifesto to cast off. In this book she argues that while the man leaves, the woman waits for his return. Much of the time, women do not dare to travel out of fear although, statistically, the most dangerous place for women is at home. Women's travels have always been opposed, made invisible, ridiculed, or prohibited. With women having been historically confined in convents, asylums or the home, travel becomes one of the most symbolic means for them to free themselves from their captive condition. Inspired by true stories from travel literature and her personal experiences, Azema uses the book to denounce the male vision of adventure, which often sexualises places such as Thailand and Polynesia in a misogynistic way, and to emphasise the stories of famous female explorers. Azema stresses that the history of the world has been written by men, most of the time Westerners, which makes travel writing unequal, dominant and colonialist. She argues that long-distance women travellers, such as David-Néel, Ella Maillart, Annemarie Schwarzenbach, and Isabelle Eberhardt have also travelled the world and recounted their adventures, but have been subsequently made invisible.

Azema's second book L'usage du thé (The use of tea) was published in 2022. With the subtitle a sensitive story from the end of the world, the book helps the reader discover the tea plant and its usage. She argues that tea is a symbol of travel and she takes the reader through the history of this thousand-year-old drink, from the first caravans that spread its use up to the era of colonisation. From its origins in China to its exploitation by British tea companies, the drink is a paradoxically a symbol of both travel and a sedentary lifestyle. It provides social rituals. The book's title was inspired by L'Usage du monde by Nicolas Bouvier.

Azema has been a jury member for What a Trip, a festival of film of travel and adventure, held in Montpellier, France.

== Publications ==
- Les femmes aussi sont du voyage: L'émancipation par le départ (Women are also travellers. Emancipation through departure). Paris, Flammarion, 2021, 286 p. ISBN 9782080208613. Translated into Italian (Donne in Viaggio) and Spanish (Mujeres en ruta)
- L'usage du thé: Une histoire sensible du bout du monde. Flammarion, 2022, 240 p. ISBN 9782080264565. Translated into Italian (Le strade del tè. Sorseggiare il tempo)
