= Revue des deux Mondes =

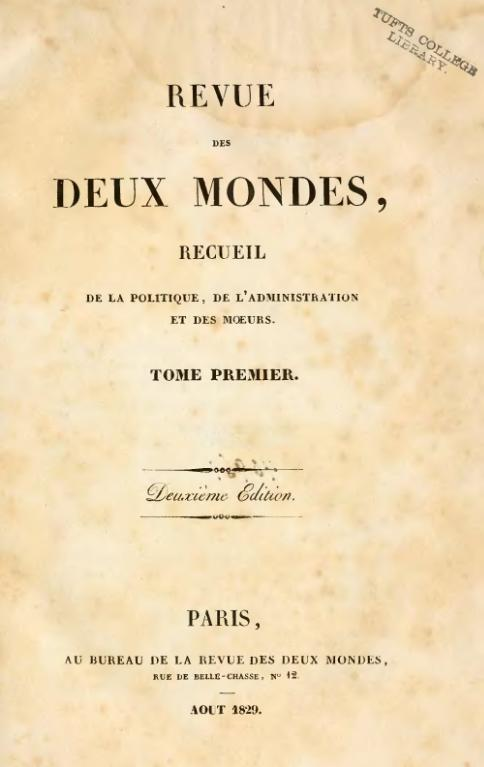
- Discipline: Literature, history, art and science
- Language: French
- Edited by: Société de la Revue des Deux Mondes

Publication details
- History: 1829–present
- Frequency: Monthly

Standard abbreviations
- ISO 4: Rev. Deux Mondes

Indexing
- ISSN: 0035-1962
- OCLC no.: 476419311

Links
- Journal homepage

The Revue des deux Mondes (French: [ʁəvy de dø mɔ̃d], Review of the Two Worlds) is a monthly French-language literary, cultural and current affairs magazine that has been published in Paris since 1829.

According to its website, "it is today the place for debates and dialogues between nations, disciplines and cultures, about the major subjects of our societies". The main shareholder is Marc Ladreit de Lacharrière's FIMALAC Group.

== History ==
The Revue des deux Mondes was founded by Prosper Mauroy and Pierre de Ségur-Dupeyron, first appearing on 1 August 1829. It began when an anodyne periodical, Journal des voyages, was purchased by the young printer Auguste-Jean Auffray, who convinced his college roommate François Buloz to edit it. Its original emphasis on travel and foreign affairs soon shifted; according to its website, it was created to "establish a cultural, economic and political bridge between France and the United States", the Old World and the New. (Note: This bridge may explain Wallace Stevens's reference to the Revue in his poem "Colloquy with a Polish Aunt".) It was purchased in 1831 by François Buloz, who was its editor until 1877, when Charles Buloz took over direction. Another influential editor was Ferdinand Brunetière (after 1893).

Among the early regular contributors who established the review's reputation as an elite liberal vehicle of haute culture were Albert, 4th duc de Broglie, François Guizot, Jacques Nicolas Augustin Thierry, Ludovic Vitet, Paul-François Dubois, the literary critics Eugène-Melchior de Vogüé, Charles Augustin Sainte-Beuve, Gustave Planche and Jean-Jacques Ampère.

Heinrich Heine first published an essay in three parts in 1834, De l'Allemagne depuis Luther, a history of emancipation in Germany beginning with the Reformation. Stendhal published his novella Mina de Wangel in the magazine. George Sand also serialised her novel Mauprat in the magazine in 1837. Marguerite-Hélène Mahé serialised her novel Sortilèges créoles: Eudora ou l'île enchantée (fr), describing slavery in Réunion. A later contributor was Hippolyte Taine.

In the late 19th century, the Revue was regarded as a prestigious gateway to literary and academic recognition; Léon Daudet wrote that "In practice, the Revue des Deux Mondes was like the antechamber to the Académie française".

== Chief editors ==
- François Buloz, 1831–1877;
- Charles Buloz, 1877–1893;
- Ferdinand Brunetière, 1893–1906;
- Francis Charmes, 1907–1915;
- René Doumic, 1916–1937;
- André Chaumeix, 1937–1955;
- Claude-Joseph Gignoux, 1955–1966;
- Jean Vigneau, 1966–1970;
- Jean Jaudel, 1970–1991;
- Jean Bothorel, 1991–1995;
- Bruno de Cessole, 1995–1999;
- Nathalie de Baudry d’Asson, 1999–2002;
- Michel Crépu, 2002–2014;
- Valerie Toranian, 2014–2022;
- Aurélie Julia, 2022–present.
