= François Bédarida =

French 20th-century historian

- Born: 14 March 1926; Lyon, France
- Died: 16 September 2001 (aged 75); Fontaine-le-Port, France
- Known for: Historian of England and France
- Spouse: Renėe Bédarida
- Children: 3
- Awards: Prix Mémoire de la Shoah 1992, Chevalier de la Légion d'honneur, Officier de l'ordre national du Mérite 1999

Academic background
- Education: École normale supérieure (Paris)

Academic work
- Discipline: history
- Sub-discipline: Victorian England, WWII, Vichy France, Antisemitism
- Institutions: French National Centre for Scientific Research, Institut de France, Sorbonne University, University of Oxford

François Bédarida (14 March 1926 – 16 September 2001) was a French academic historian. His work centred on Victorian England and France during World War II. He made significant research contributions to the study of The Holocaust. He was a director of the Maison française in Oxford among other leadership roles.

== Life ==
François Bédarida was born on 14 March 1926 in Lyon, into a family of Catholic intellectuals. His father, Henri Bédarida, was a specialist in Italian studies and professor at the Sorbonne. François attended the Lycée Montaigne (Paris), the Lycée Louis-le-Grand and the Lycée Henri-IV where he was deemed a brilliant student.

He died on 16 September 2001 in Fontaine-le-Port.

=== French Resistance ===
During the Occupation of France, his father gave sanctuary to the Catholic priest, Pierre Chaillet SJ. The youthful Bédarida was actively involved in the French Resistance and joined the Christian Témoignage chrétien movement where he met his future wife, Renée Bédarida.

=== Academic career ===
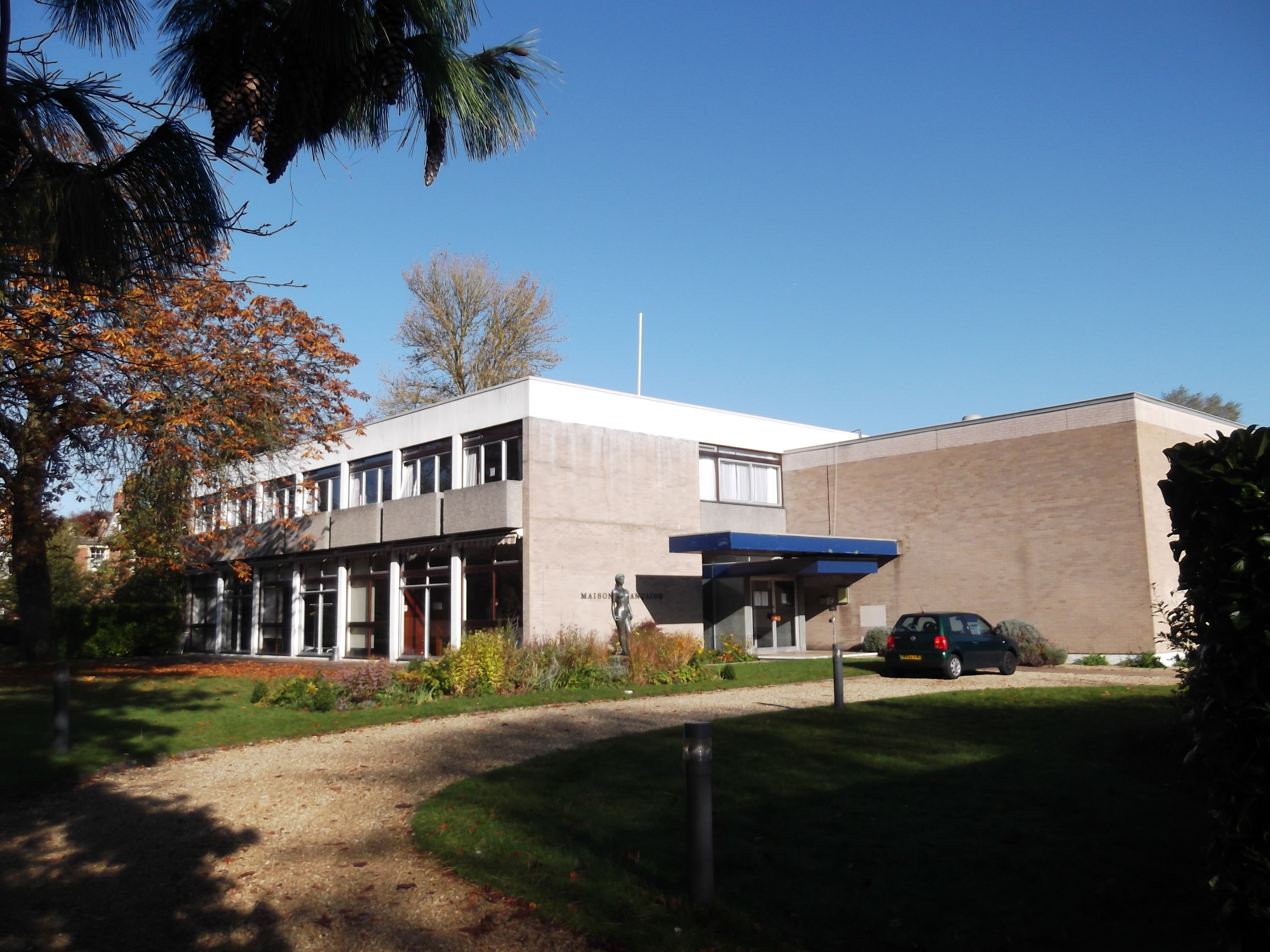
Maison Française, Oxford where Bédarida was an early director

In 1946 he resumed his education and entered the École normale supérieure in Paris and in 1949 graduated in History after a brief stint teaching at the Lycée Thiers in Marseille. His doctoral thesis was on the Catholic population in London at the end of the 19th-century. François Bédarida then left for London to teach and carry out research at the French Institute during 1950-1956. In 1956 on his return to France, he became an associate of the CNRS (1956-1959). Then followed a period of five years as assistant professor in modern and contemporary history at the Sorbonne. In 1966 he was appointed head of the Maison Française in Oxford, whose first permanent home he launched and opened in the presence of French Culture Minister, André Malraux. Between 1971 and 1978 he was master of conferences at the Institut d'etudes politiques de Paris. He became Director of research at the CNRS in 1979. He was a founder and first director of the Institut d'histoire du temps présent, from 1978 to 1990, and between 1990 and 2000 he held the post of General Secretary of the International Committee of Historical Sciences (ICHS/CIHS).

== Historian of Victorian England and France under Vichy ==
François Bédarida's first studies were into Victorian England. Notable among his work was a study of Will Thorne. In the 1970s he changed tack and researched Vichy France and its antidemocratic political philosophy. Beside the work of the American historian, Robert Paxton among a few others, he exposed the nature and ideology of the régime of Pétain. Prior to that, for thirty years the Vichy administration was seen merely as an adjunct of the Third Reich. He thereby locked into the two responsibilities of the historian in relation to that particular period, to perpetuate the role of the Resistance movement, and to establish scientifically the truth about events in order to avoid the creation of myths about that time. He collaborated with several authors in a number of publications on The Holocaust, notably with Jean-Pierre Azéma and his own wife, Renée Bédarida.

== Selected works ==
in French:

- La Grande-Bretagne - L'Angleterre triomphante (1832-1914), Hatier, coll. « Histoire Contemporaine », Paris, 1974
- La stratégie secrète de la "drôle de guerre": le Conseil suprême interallié de 1939- avril 1940. Paris: Presses de la Fondation nationale des sciences politiques / Éditions du CNRS. 1979. p. 573. ISBN 2-7246-0428-8.
- Syndicats et patrons en Grande-Bretagne (with Éric Giuily and Gérard Rameix). Éditions de l'Atelier, 1980
- Bédarida, François, ed. (1987). Normandie 44, du débarquement à la libération [Normandy 44: Landing to the Liberation] (in French). Paris: Albin Michel.
- La Politique nazie d'extermination, Albin Michel, Paris, 1989
- La Société anglaise du milieu du 19è siècle à nos jours (1851-1975), Seuil, Paris, 1990
- Le Nazisme et le génocide – Histoire et enjeux, Nathan, Paris, 1991
- Le Nazisme et le génocide – Histoire et témoignage, Pocket, Paris, 1992
- Le régime de Vichy et les Français, 1992 (with Jean-Pierre Azéma)
- La France des années noires, Azéma, Jean-Pierre and Bédarida, François (eds.) 2 vol., Paris, Seuil, 1993 [rééd. Seuil, 2000 (Points Histoire)]
- Bédarida, François; Bédarida, Renée (1993). "La Persécution des Juifs". In Azéma, Jean-Pierre; Bédarida, François (eds.). La France des années noires: De l'Occupation à la Libération (in French). Vol. 2. Paris: Seuil. pp. 149–182. ISBN 9782020183048. OCLC 474077715.
- L'Histoire et le métier d'historien en France 1945-1995, Éditions de la Maison des sciences de l'homme, Paris, 1995
- Churchill, Fayard, Paris, 1999,
- Histoire, critique et responsabilité, IHTP-CNRS/Complexe, coll. « Histoire du temps présent », Paris/Bruxelles, 2003
- Preface to Les Témoins de Jéhovah face à Hitler by Guy Canonici Éditions Albin Michel S.A. 1998

in English:

- Bédarida, François (1979). A social history of England, 1851–1975. Cambridge University Press. ISBN 978-0-416-85920-1.
- A social history of England, 1851–1990, Routledge, 1991, ISBN 0-415-01614-2, ISBN 978-0-415-01614-8

in Spanish:

- Bédarida, François (1998). "Definición, método y práctica de la Historia del Tiempo Presente", Cuadernos de Historia Contemporánea 20:19-27.

== Awards ==
- Honorary MA from the University of Oxford 1966
- Prix Mémoire de la Shoah 1992
- Chevalier de la Legion d'honneur
- Officier du Mérite (1999)
- Prix de la Fondation Pierre-Lafue, 2000

== Legacy ==
The collected papers of François Bédarida are stored at the Archives nationales, on the site of Pierrefitte-sur-Seine, under code 673AP

== See also ==
- List of contemporary French historians
