= Anne Cheynet =

French writer (1938–2025)

- Born: 23 August 1938; Saint-Denis, Réunion
- Died: 23 May 2025 (aged 86)
- Occupation: Author

Anne-Marie Thérèse Fontaine (23 August 1938 – 23 May 2025), known by her pen name Anne Cheynet, was a French author in Réunion. Her 1977 work Les Muselés is considered a significant contribution to Réunionnais literature, as the first novel to be formally labeled as "Réunionnais."

== Life and career ==
Anne-Marie Thérèse Fontaine was born in Saint-Denis, Réunion, in 1938, and spent her childhood in the city's Saint-François neighborhood. She traveled to Aix-en-Provence to study in 1956, remaining abroad until 1963.

Back on the island, she worked as a secondary school teacher before getting involved in politics. She later returned to the classroom as a preschool teacher.

She published her first book, the poetry collection Matanans et Langoutis, in 1972, followed by her best-known work, the novel Les Muselés, which is considered the first work billed as a "Réunionnais novel." The novel, which has an activist slant, focuses on the lives of the poor in Réunion. Cheynet, who was from a poor white family, drew on her experiences of discrimination during the island's colonial era.

Anne Cheynet subsequently published several other books, including the poetry collection Ter tout' kouler and the short story collection Rivages maouls. In 2022, she released a bilingual story collection illustrated by Claire Ruiz, La clé dans zot poche: Histoires semées depuis le Grand Sentier.

Between 2001 and 2004, she produced three CDs of oral storytelling.

She wrote in both French and Creole.

Cheynet died on 23 May 2025, at the age of 86.

== Selected works ==
- Matanans et Langoutis (poetry), 1972
- Les Muselés (novel), L'Harmattan, 1977
- Ter tout' kouler : Poème pour la terre multicolore (poetry), vol. 1, Ravine des Sables, ADMV, 1992
- Rivages maouls : histoires d'Annabelle (autobiographical), vol. 1, Océan, 1994
- La clé dans zot poche: Histoires semées depuis le Grand Sentier (stories), Éditions Poisson Rouge, 2022
