= Christian Ingrao =

French War historian (born 1970)

Christian Ingrao (born 13 June 1970) is a French war historian. He is a research director at CNRS within the Raymond Aron Center for Sociological and Political Studies (CESPRA) of the École des Hautes Etudes en Sciences Sociales in Paris. A specialist in the history of Nazism and the violence of war, he dedicates himself to the cultural history of Nazi German militancy and practices of violence, particularly on World War II's Eastern Front especially the 36th Waffen Grenadier Division of the German SS. He was director of the Institute for the History of the Present Time from 2008 to 2013.
