= Vailhauquès =

- Commune
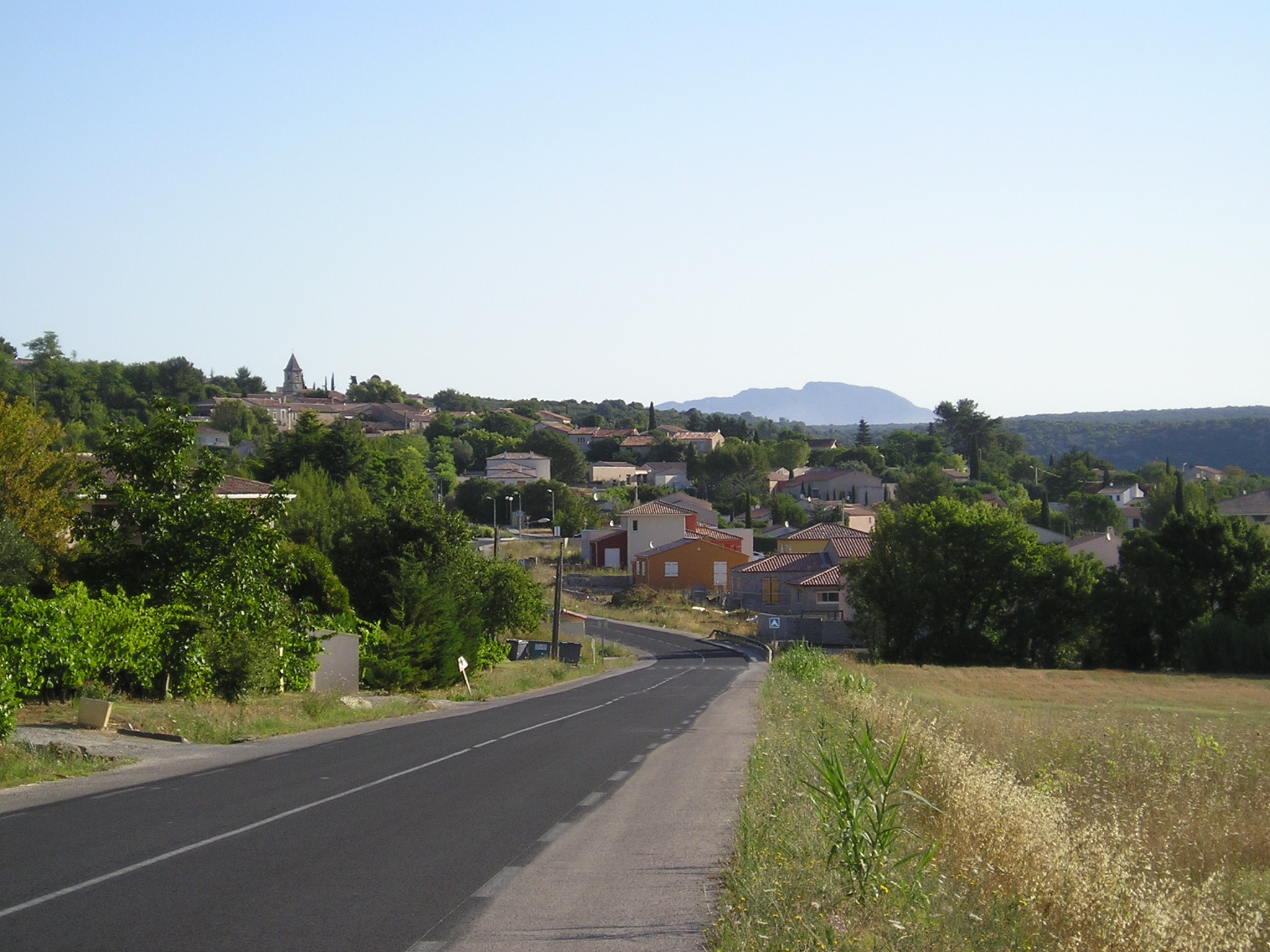
- A general view of Vailhauquès

- Coat of arms
- Location of Vailhauquès
- Location within France Location within Occitanie
- Coordinates: 43°40′24″N 3°43′07″E
- Country: France
- Region: Occitania
- Department: Hérault
- Arrondissement: Lodève
- Canton: Saint-Gély-du-Fesc

Government
  - Mayor (2020–2026): Hussam Almallak
- Area^{1}: 16.12 km^{2} (6.22 sq mi)
- Highest elevation: 298 m (978 ft)
- Lowest elevation: 76 m (249 ft)
- Population (2023): 2,722
  - Density: 168.9/km^{2} (437.3/sq mi)
- Time zone: UTC+01:00 (CET)
  - Summer (DST): UTC+02:00 (CEST)
- INSEE/Postal code: 34320 /34570
- ^{1} French Land Register data, which excludes lakes, ponds, glaciers > 1 km^{2} (0.386 sq mi or 247 acres) and river estuaries.

Vailhauquès (French pronunciation: [vajokɛs]; Occitan: Valhauqués) is a commune in the Hérault department in the Occitanie region in southern France.

== Population ==
Historical population
Year	Pop.	±% p.a.
1968	235	—
1975	315	+4.27%
1982	772	+13.66%
1990	1,317	+6.90%
1999	1,899	+4.15%
2007	2,082	+1.16%
2012	2,573	+4.33%
2017	2,553	−0.16%
2023	2,722	+1.07%
Source: INSEE

== See also ==
- Communes of the Hérault department
