= Letters from several parts of Europe and the East =

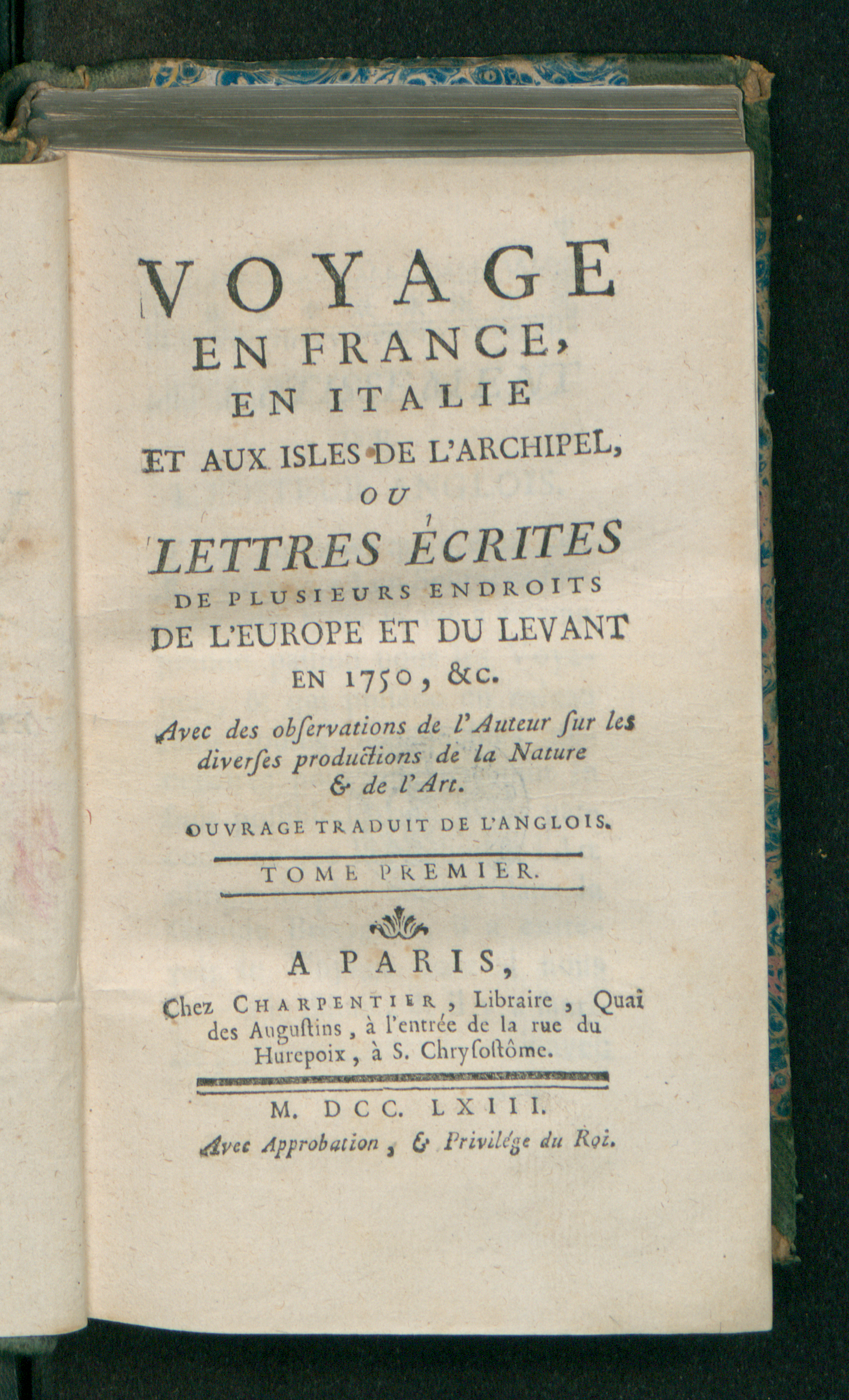
- Author: Dr. Maihows
- Language: English
- Genre: travel literature
- Published: 1750
- Publisher: Charpentier
- Publication place: France

Letters from several parts of Europe and the East (full title Letters from several parts of Europe and the East. Written in the Years 1750, ... in there are contained the Writer' s Observation on the Productions of Nature, the Monuments of Art, and the Manners of the Inhabitants) is a 1750 epistolary reportage (a collection of his letters) written by the British doctor Maihows; the Letters remained anonymous for over a century until 1881, when the work was published in French.

The travel takes place for the most part in Italy. Unlike most travelers who did the Grand Tour, Maihows' intent was not to expand his own and others' artistic knowledge, but to enrich the scientific-technological ones.

Letters from several parts of Europe is one of the accounts that helped to outline the image of Italy at that time and of Tuscany in particular.

== Publishing history ==
The book had a very troubled publishing story. Published anonymously in 1750, the "Letters" were republished in London in 1760 in two volumes with the title A tour through several parts of Europe and the East. They were translated into French and published in four volumes in 1763 under the title Voyage en France, en Italie et aux isles de l'archipel, by Philippe-Florent Puisieux. They were published again in French in 1783. The 1881 French edition as a summary preparation in mind of Hippolyte Bonnardot is the first to bear the name of the author, the dr. Maihows.

== Content ==
Most of the report focused on the trip to Italy. Dr. Maihows visits numerous cities including Genova, Milan, Venice, Brescia, Verona, Vicenza, Padua, Ferrara, Ravenna, Rimini, Pesaro, Recanati, Spoleto, Terni, Narni, Rome, going to the South to Naples and Ercolano; returning to the North, the traveler went to Siena, Livorno, Pisa, Florence and Bologna; the city of Emilia is particularly relevant for scientific reasons.
