= Hafize Hajdini =

Kosovo-Albanian deputy

Member of the Assembly of Kosovo
- In office 17 February 2008 – 2008

Personal details
- Born: October 1, 1972 (age 53) Ferizaj, SR Serbia, SFR Yugoslavia (now Kosovo)
- Party: SLS
- Known for: Member of the Assembly of Kosovo

Hafize Hajdini (born October 1, 1972) is a former Kosovo-Albanian politician.

== Biography ==
He was a member of the Assembly of Kosovo from the SLS Parliamentary Group in the period of Kosovo's declaration of independence, on February 17, 2008. Hajdini graduated from the High School in Ferizaj in Economics. Hajdini was the Director of the NGO Center, SHG. A.K “Edona”.
