= Azem Mullaliu =

Albanian footballer

Personal information
- Place of birth: Kavajë, Albania
- Position: Defender

Senior career*
Years	Team	Apps	(Gls)
- Besa Kavajë

Managerial career
- 1995–1996: Besa Kavajë
- * Club domestic league appearances and goals

Azem Mullaliu (born in Kavajë) is a retired Albanian footballer who played as a defender for Besa Kavajë in the Albanian Superliga during the 1970s. He was called up and played in several unofficial matches for the Albania national football team.
