= Joël Manglou =

French musician (1958–2026)

- Born: 14 June 1958; Sainte-Suzanne, Réunion, France
- Died: 3 October 2026 (aged 68)
- Occupation: Musician

Joël Manglou (French: [ʒɔˈɛl mɑ̃ɡlˈu]; 14 June 1958 – 3 October 2026) was a French musician.

Manglou grew up in a family of nine children and initially worked in agro-tourism. In his early career, he was a member of bands such as Kalou Pilé and Mascareignas. After his retirement, he became an innkeeper and returned to the agro-tourism industry.

Manglou died on 3 October 2026, at the age of 68.

== Discography ==
- Ravages (1996)
- A cause (2000)
- 'Magine (2003)
- Le Meilleur de Joël Manglou (2010)
