= François Buloz =

French writer (1803–1877)

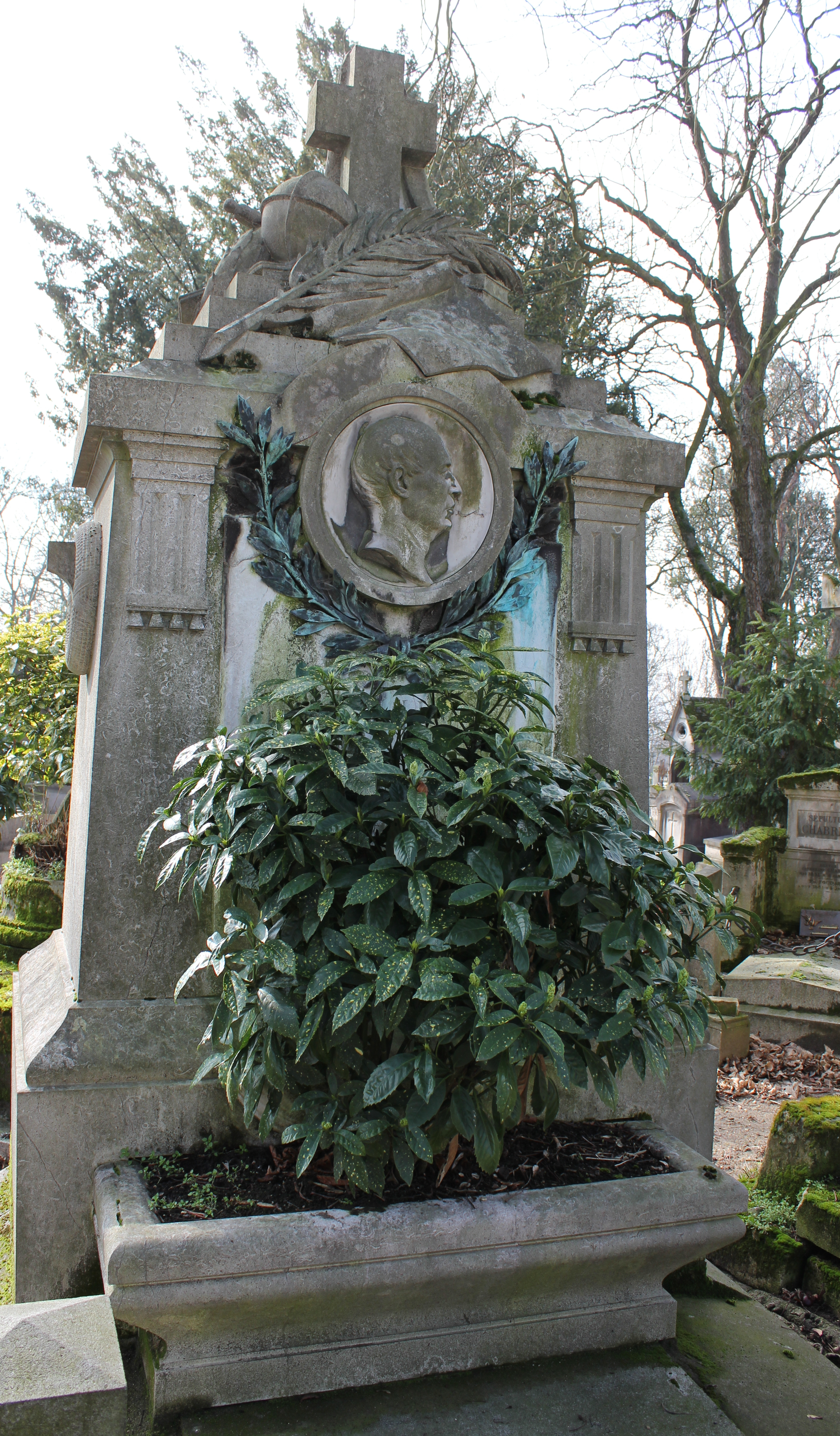
tomb of François Buloz, Père-Lachaise Cemetery, Paris

François Buloz (20 September 1803 – 12 January 1877) was a French littérateur, magazine editor, and theater administrator.

He was born in Vulbens, Haute-Savoie, near Geneva, and died in Paris.

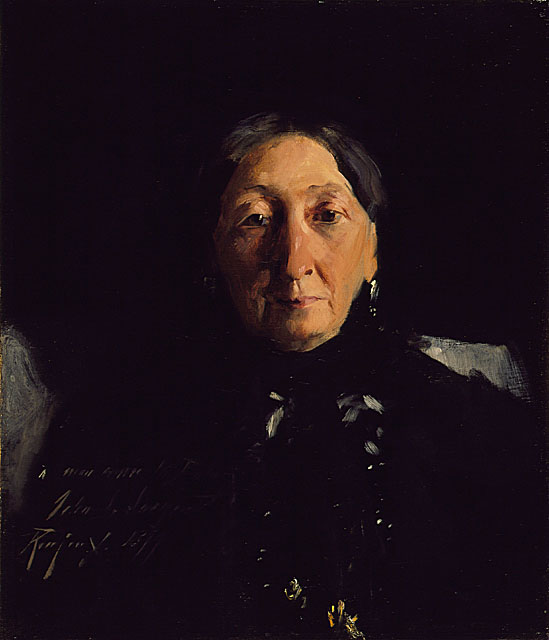
Mme. François Buloz (Christine Blaze), John Singer Sargent, 1879

Originally employed as a chemist, and then as a printer and proofreader, he became the editor of the Revue des deux Mondes in 1831. Making an audacious change in its direction, Buloz took the magazine to the pinnacle of French publishing by bringing in some of France's most celebrated literary talent: Sainte-Beuve, Victor Hugo, Alfred de Vigny, Alfred de Musset, George Sand, Balzac, Dumas père and eventually Octave Feuillet, Hippolyte Taine and Ernest Renan.

From 17 October 1838 to 2 March 1848, Buloz was chief administrator of the Comédie-Française.

== See also ==
- List of works by Eugène Guillaume
