= Azem Hajdini =

Albanian writer (1924–2010)

- Born: 15 July 1924; Dashec, Drenica, Kingdom of Yugoslavia (present day Kosovo
- Died: 20 September 2010 (aged 86); Pristina, Kosovo
- Education: University of Pristina
- Occupations: Writer, lawyer
- Writing career
- Period: 1945-2010
- Genre: History
- Subjects: Albanian history, communism

Azem Hajdini was an Albanian writer and lawyer from Kosovo. He was one of the surviving witnesses from the Bar massacre.
