= Azeem =

Azeem (Arabic: "Great") is both a given name and a surname. Notable people with the name include:

== As a given name ==
- Azeem (rapper), American hip hop musician born Azeem Ismail
- Azeem Ghumman, Pakistani cricketer
- Azeem Hafeez, Pakistani cricketer
- Azeem Pitcher, Bermudian cricketer
- Azeem Rafiq, English cricketer
- Azeem Ahmed Tariq, Pakistani politician
- Azeem Victor, American football player

== As a surname ==
- Abida Azeem, Pakistani politician
- Neelima Azeem, Indian actor
