= Yves Manglou =

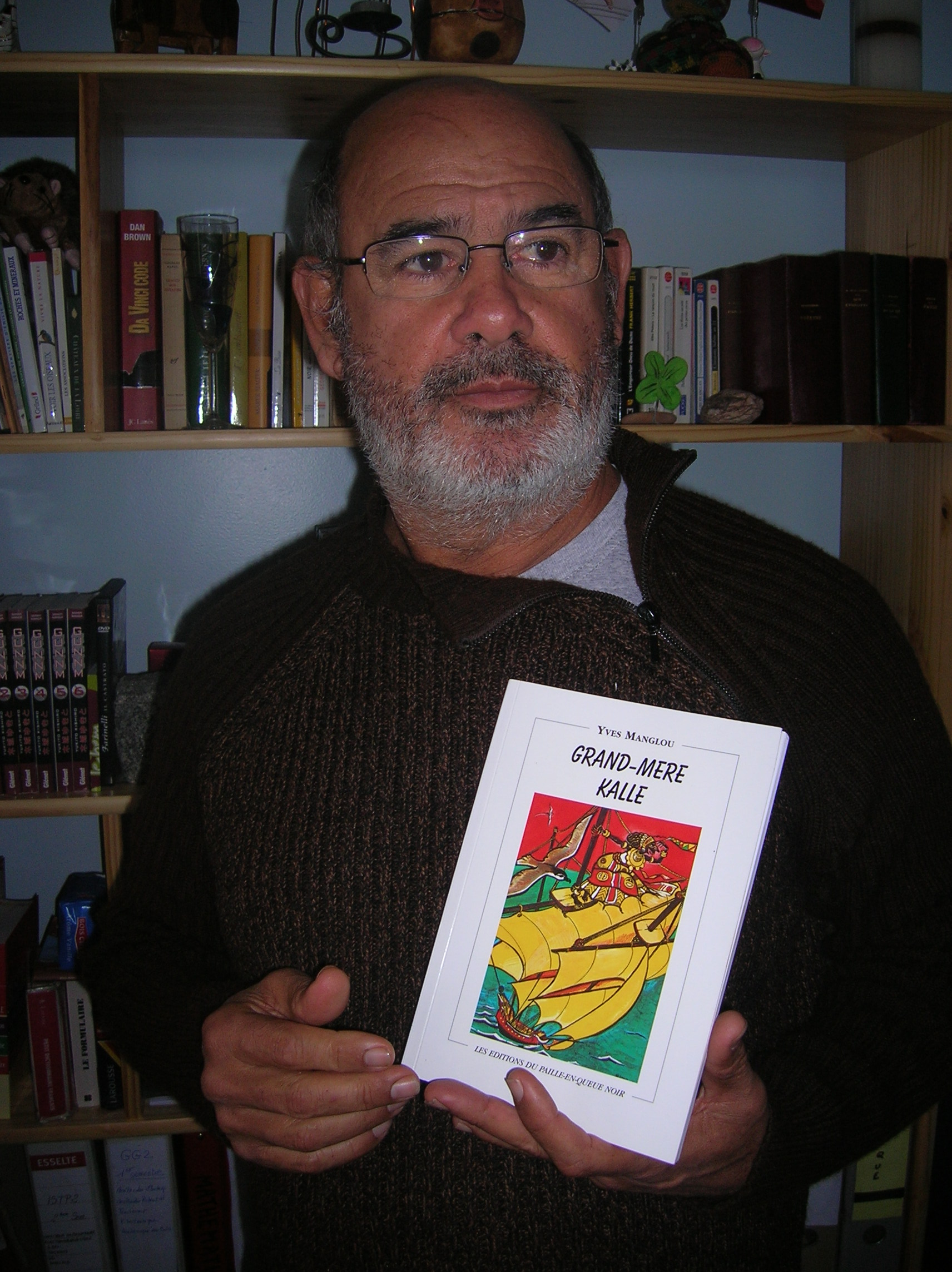
Yves Manglou, Paris 2006.

Yves Manglou (born 20 August 1943) is a Réunionese writer who writes in both French and Réunion Creole.

== Biography ==
Yves Manglou grew up on the French island of Réunion, at a time when traditional storytelling was still very popular. Réunion was still a French colony and the abolition of slavery had occurred less than a century before.

Brought up as one of nine children under the watchful eye of his school teacher father and stay-at-home mother, Manglou enjoyed much freedom exploring the banks of the Saint-Jean river, often going barefoot and shirtless.

From the end of 1960 to 1975, Manglou successively held the position of Director of Social & Cultural Institutions in Sainte-Suzanne, Soisy-sous-Montmorency and Boulogne-Billancourt.

In 1971 he devoted a year of advanced study at the French National Institute of Popular Education at Marly-le-Roi to the study of the development of inter-disciplinary scholarship in rural areas. Manglou's study culminated "Animation and Development," a dissertation that was written in collaboration with Jean Schüler and is considered authoritative in the field.

In 1974–1975, as Director of the Youth Center of Boulogne-Billancourt, Manglou began to coordinate various volunteer organizations in a city of 120,000. The exhibition "Associations in the City", unique for its time, received 10,000 visitors.

During this same period Manglou also obtained a maîtrise in Human Sciences at the University of Paris, Val-de-Marne – a foreshadowing of experienced-based learning, which was later formalized in France as Validation des Acquis de l'Experience.

These various sociological approaches and a thirst for getting to know people and their cultures naturally led Yves Manglou to make his native island the focus of his literary journey.

Manglou is currently Series Editor at Éditions Orphie.

== Bibliography ==
Orphie Editions

- Grand-mère Kalle
- Noir mais Marron (Black but Brown, in reference to the name wearing by the free slaves)
- Kaloubadia Madam Debassayns (in Créole Réunionnais)

Black Phaeton Editions

- Le mystère du Piton de La Fournaise (The Fournaise mystery)
- Zépingue le Petit Tangue (in collaboration with Josette Manglou and Yves Llopiz)
- La naissance de Ticlou (in collaboration with Josette Manglou and Yves Llopiz)
