= Jean-Pierre Azéma =

French historian (1937–2025)

- Born: 30 September 1937; Paris, France
- Died: 14 July 2025 (aged 87); Paris, France
- Education: Lycée Lakanal
- Occupation: Historian
- Father: Jean-Henri Azéma

Jean-Pierre Azéma (French: [ʒɑ̃pjɛʁ azema]; 30 September 1937 – 14 July 2025) was a French historian.

== Life and career ==
Azéma was a member of the scientific counsel for the Institut François Mitterrand, an organisation founded by François Mitterrand with the goal of "contributing to the propagation of knowledge on the political and social history of modern France". He supported Ségolène Royal in the 2007 French presidential election.

Azéma was the author of several prominent historical works, which made him something of an authority amongst France's historians.

A specialist on World War II, more specifically of the Vichy Regime and the French Resistance, Azéma was a university lecturer and taught history at the Institut d'études politiques de Paris. He was also one of the historians called as witness for the trial of Maurice Papon, (alongside Marc-Olivier Baruch, Robert O. Paxton and Philippe Burrin). He was also one of the authors of the film The Eye of Vichy (L’Œil de Vichy) by Claude Chabrol. He attended the conference organised on the 60th anniversary of the death of Jean Moulin.

Azéma died on 14 July 2025, at the age of 87. He was the father of the Vichy historian Arianne Azéma.

== Select works ==
- 6 juin 44, 2004 (with Robert O. Paxton, Philippe Burrin)
- Jean Moulin : le politique, le rebelle, le résistant, 2003
- Jean Cavaillès résistant ou La pensée en actes, 2002 (written under his direction)
- De Munich à la Libération: 1938–1944, Cambridge University Press, 1990, new edition, 2002
- Vichy : 1940–1944, 2000 (with Olivier Wieviorka)
- 1938–1948 : les années de tourmente : de Munich à Prague : dictionnaire critique, 1995 (with François Bédarida)
- Histoire de l'extrême droite en France, 1994 (under the direction of Michel Winock) Seuil, ISBN 978-2-02-018896-8
- Jean Moulin et la Résistance en 1943, Jean-Pierre Azéma (ed), Institut d'histoire du temps présent, 1994
- Les libérations de la France, 1993 (with Olivier Wieviorka)
- La France des années noires, 1993 (with François Bédarida)
- Le régime de Vichy et les Français, 1992 (with François Bédarida)
- La III^{e} République : 1870–1940, (with Michel Winock) Calmann-Lévy, 1970, new edition, 1991
- 1940, l'année terrible, Seuil, 1990, ISBN 978-2-02-012131-6
- Paris Under the Occupation, Gilles Perrault, Jean-Pierre Azéma, Deutsch, 1989, ISBN 978-0-233-98511-4
- Les communistes français de Munich à Châteaubriand : 1938–1941, 1987 (with Antoine Prost and Jean-Pierre Rioux)
- Histoire générale politique et sociale : la France des années sombres, les années 40, 1987
- La collaboration : 1940–1944, 1975
- Les Communards, 1964 (with Michel Winock) Éditions du seuil, 1970
