= Henri Azéma =

French doctor

Joseph Jean Stéphen Henri Azéma (18 October 1861 in Saint-Denis – ?) was a medical doctor from Réunion. He was the son of historian Georges Azéma, and also served as a local councillor on Réunion. His maternal uncle was the journalist Louis Brunet. He was a doctor of the colonial Hospital of La Réunion, the General Council and deputy mayor of Saint-Denis and was made Chevalier of the Légion d'honneur in 1905.

== Bibliography ==
- Biography
