= Mazaé Azéma =

French politician and doctor (1823–1886)

François Jean-Pierre Henri Azéma, called Mazaé Azéma, was a French politician and doctor of Réunionnais birth. Born in Saint-Denis on 17 July 1823, he died on 28 July 1886. He was a surgeon who had studied urology.

From 1862 till 1870, he was a vice-president of the Society of the sciences and the arts of La Réunion. In 1864, he became member corresponding of the Society of surgery of Paris and the Society of Anthropology of Paris, and corresponding member of the Royal Society of the arts and the sciences of the island Mauriceen on 1865. He served on the General Council of Réunion from 1867, and received the Légion d'honneur in 1877.

== Bibliography ==
- Biographical information
