= Jean-Henri Azéma =

French poet

- Born: 28 December 1913; Saint-Denis, Réunion
- Died: 13 October 2000 (aged 86); Buenos Aires, Argentina
- Occupation: Poet

Jean-Henri Azéma, called Jean Azéma (28 December 1913 – 13 October 2000) was a French poet of Réunionnais origin. Born in Saint-Denis, he died in Buenos Aires, where he had fled after collaborating with the Nazis during World War II. His son was the historian Jean-Pierre Azéma.

== Bibliography ==
- Brief biographical sketch on answers.com
