= List of works by Gerald Durrell =

This is a list of works by Gerald Durrell.

== Bibliography ==
=== Autobiographical ===
- The Overloaded Ark (Faber and Faber, 1953)
- Three Singles to Adventure (Three Tickets to Adventure) (Rupert Hart-Davis, 1954)
- The Bafut Beagles (Rupert Hart-Davis, 1954)
- The New Noah (Rupert Hart-Davis, 1955)
- The Drunken Forest (Rupert Hart-Davis, 1956)
- My Family and Other Animals (Rupert Hart-Davis, 1956) – first in the Corfu trilogy
- Encounters with Animals (Rupert Hart-Davis, 1958)
- A Zoo in My Luggage (Rupert Hart-Davis, 1960)
- The Whispering Land (Rupert Hart-Davis, 1961)
- Menagerie Manor (Rupert Hart-Davis, 1964)
- Two in the Bush (Collins, 1966)
- Birds, Beasts, and Relatives (Collins, 1969) - second in the Corfu trilogy
- Fillets of Plaice (Collins, 1971)
- Catch Me a Colobus (Collins, 1972)
- Beasts in My Belfry (A Bevy of Beasts) (Collins, 1973)
- The Stationary Ark (Collins, 1976) (mainly non-fictional content)
- Golden Bats And Pink Pigeons: A Journey to the Flora and Fauna of a Unique Island (Collins, 1977)
- The Garden of the Gods (Fauna and Family) (Collins, 1978) - third in the Corfu trilogy
- The Picnic And Suchlike Pandemonium (The Picnic and Other Inimitable Stories) (Collins, 1979) (also containing short fiction)
- Ark on the Move (Coward McCann, 1982)
- How to Shoot an Amateur Naturalist (Collins, 1984)
- Durrell in Russia (with Lee Durrell) (MacDonald (Publisher) (UK) / Simon & Schuster (U.S.), 1986)
- The Ark's Anniversary (Collins, 1990)
- Marrying Off Mother and Other Stories (Harper-Collins, 1991) (with some fictional short stories)
- The Aye-Aye And I: A Rescue Journey to Save One of the World's Most Intriguing Creatures from Extinction (Harper-Collins, 1992)

=== Non-fiction ===
- Island Zoo: The Animals a Famous Collector Couldn't Part with (photographs by W. Suschitzky) (Collins, 1961)
- Look at Zoos (Hamish Hamilton, 1961)
- A Practical Guide for the Amateur Naturalist (with Lee Durrell) (Hamish Hamilton (UK) / Alfred A. Knopf (U.S.), 1982)

=== Fiction ===
- The Donkey Rustlers (Collins, 1968)
- Rosy Is My Relative (Collins, 1968)
- The Talking Parcel (Battle for Castle Cockatrice) (Collins, 1974)
- The Mockery Bird (Collins, 1981)
- The Fantastic Flying Journey: An Adventure in Natural History (Conran Octopus, 1987)
- The Fantastic Dinosaur Adventure: A New Adventure in Natural History (Conran Octopus, 1989)
- Keeper (Michael O'Mara Books, 1990)
- Toby the Tortoise (Michael O'Mara Books, 1991)
- Puppy's Wild Time ('Puppy Tales' No. 1) (Scott Ltd, 1993)
- Puppy's Beach Adventure ('Puppy Tales' No. 2) (Scott Ltd, 1993)
- Puppy's Pet Pals ('Puppy Tales' No. 3) (Scott Ltd, 1993)
- Puppy's Field Day ('Puppy Tales' No. 4) (Scott Ltd, 1993)

=== Compilations ===
- The Best of Gerald Durrell (edited by Lee Durrell) (Harper-Collins, 1996)

=== Unpublished ===
- Animal Pie, an unpublished book of lighthearted animal poems and caricatures, written in the 1950s [referenced in the official Douglas Botting biography]

=== Contributions ===
- Durrell, Lee (1986). State of the Ark: An atlas of conservation in action. Bodley Head. ISBN 978-0-370-30754-1. (Foreword; the book is also dedicated to him.)
- Wilkinson, Peter; Helen Gilks (1993). Wildlife Photographer of the Year. Portfolio 2. Fountain. ISBN 978-0-86343-306-1. (Foreword)

=== Books edited by Durrell ===
- My Favourite Animal Stories (Arrow Books, 1962)

==== Selected articles ====
- "I am sort of caged in my own zoo"

In case of simultaneous releases in many countries, the UK edition is referred to, except for companion books to TV series where both the UK and US editions are referred to.

=== Reference books ===
==== Biographies and other references ====
- Himself and Other Animals: A Portrait of Gerald Durrell, David Hughes (1976)
- In The Footsteps of Lawrence Durrell and Gerald Durrell in Corfu (1935–39), Hilary Whitton Paipeti (1998)
- Gerald Durrell: The Authorized Biography, Douglas Botting (1999)
- "Durrelliania": An Illustrated Checklist of Inscribed Books of Lawrence Durrell and Gerald Durrell and Associated Publications, Letters and Notes in the Library of Jeremy J. C. Mallinson, edited by Jeremy Mallinson (1999)
- Amateurs in Eden: The Story of a Bohemian Marriage: Nancy and Lawrence Durrell, Joanna Hodgkin (2012)
- The Durrells of Corfu, Michael Haag (2017)
- Dining with the Durrells: Stories and Recipes from the Cookery Archive of Mrs Louisa Durrell, David Shimwell (2019)

==== Jersey Zoo and Durrell Wildlife Preservation Trust books ====
- A Brush with Animals, Ralph Thompson (illustrations by author) (1963)
- Okavango Adventure: In Search of Animals in Southern Africa, Jeremy Mallinson (1973)
- Earning Your Living with Animals, Jeremy Mallinson (1975)
- The Facts About a Zoo: Featuring the Jersey Wildlife Preservation Trust, Jeremy Mallinson (1980)
- State of the Ark: An Atlas of Conservation in Action, Lee Durrell (1986)
- Travels in Search of Endangered Species, Jeremy Mallinson (1989)
- Gerald Durrell's Army, Edward Whitley (1992)
- Jambo: A Gorilla's Story, Richard Johnstone-Scott (1995)
- The Touch of Durrell: A Passion for Animals, Jeremy Mallinson (2009)

==== Companion books to TV series not co-authored by Durrell ====
- Ourselves and Other Animals: From the TV Series with Gerald and Lee Durrell, Peter Evans (1987)

==== Books and letters by family and friends ====
- Prospero's Cell: A Guide to the Landscape and Manners of the Island of Corcyra, Lawrence Durrell (1945)
- Beasts in My Bed, Jacquie Durrell (1967)
- Spirit of Place: Essays and Letters on Travel, Lawrence Durrell (1969)
- Island Trails, Theodore Stephanides (1973)
- Intimate Relations, Jacquie Durrell (1976)
- Whatever Happened to Margo, Margaret Durrell (1995) (written in the 1960s)
- The Durrell-Miller Letters: 1935-1980, Lawrence Durrell and Henry Miller (1998)
- Autumn Gleanings: Corfu Memoirs and Poems, Theodore Stephanides (2011) (apparently written in the 1970s)

== Radio and filmography ==
=== Featuring the subject ===
- Encounters With Animals, Radio series, BBC (1957)
- To Bafut With Beagles, TV series, BBC (1958)
- Look (Argentinian Expedition), Single episode in TV series, BBC (1961)
- Zoo Packet, TV series, BBC (1961)
- Animal Magic, early episodes in TV series, BBC (1962–1983)
- Two in the Bush, TV series, BBC (1963)
- Catch Me a Colobus, TV series, BBC (1966)
- The Garden of the Gods, TV series, BBC (1967)
- The Stationary Ark, TV series, Primedia (Canada) / Channel 4 (UK) (1975)
- Animals Are My Life, episode in the TV series The World About Us, BBC (1978)
- Ark on the Move, TV series, Primedia (Canada) / Channel 4 (UK) (1982)
- The Amateur Naturalist, TV series, CBC / Channel 4 (UK) (1983)
- Ourselves & Other Animals, TV series, Primetime Television and Harcourt Films (1987).
- Durrell in Russia, TV series, Channel 4 (UK) (1986)
- Durrell's Ark, documentary, BBC (1988)
- A Day at the Zoo with Phillip Schofield, one-hour episode featuring Durrell and Jersey Zoo (1989)
- Durrell and Other Animals, TV documentary with David Attenborough, BBC (UK) (1995)
- Gerald Durrell – Himself and Other Animals, documentary, Green Umbrella Productions (1999)
- Gerald Durrell – Jambo the Gentle Giant, documentary, Green Umbrella Productions (1999)
- Gerald Durrell – To the Island of the Aye-Aye, documentary, Green Umbrella Productions (1999)
- Safe Hands in a Wild World, documentary, Green Umbrella Productions (1999)
- Inside Jersey Zoo, re-release, UK PC Advisor magazine (2001)
- The Round Island Project, re-release, UK PC Advisor magazine (2001)
- The Mauritius Conservation Mission, re-release, UK PC Advisor magazine (2001)
- My Family and Other Animals (Radio Play), BBC Radio 4 (2010)

=== On the subject ===
- A Memorial Celebration for the Life of Gerald Durrell (1995)
- World of Animals episode on Gerald Durrell and Jersey Zoo, Channel One, Moscow (2004)
- The Wild Life of Gerald Durrell, BBC Four (December 2005)
- Wildlife in a War Zone, using archival Durrell footage and examining the changes brought about by war in Sierra Leone, Animal Planet, May 2006
- Archive Hour with Bridget Nicholls: Discover Your Inner Durrell, BBC Radio 4 (September 2006)
- Fierce Creatures, a 1997 comedic film about a zoo in peril of being closed written by John Cleese, starring Cleese, Jamie Lee Curtis, Kevin Kline, and Michael Palin, is dedicated to Gerald Durrell and British humorist Peter Cook in the closing credits, with their photographs and dates of birth and death.

=== Movies ===
- The Talking Parcel, Animated movie, directed by Brian Cosgrove, Cosgrove Hall (1979)
- My Family and Other Animals, 10-episode TV series, BBC (1987)
- My Family and Other Animals, Radio drama, BBC Radio 4 (2001)
- The Fantastic Flying Journey, Animated TV series, directed by Catherine Robbins and John Coates, Two Sides TV / TV Loonland (2001)
- My Family And Other Animals, the film version of his autobiography as a child (2005)
- The Durrells, 4-season TV series (26 episodes), inspired by Durrell's three autobiographical books about his family's time on Corfu, ITV (2016–2019)

=== Screenplays ===
- Tarka the Otter, movie, directed by David Cobham (1979)

=== Time capsule ===
A time capsule buried at Jersey Zoo in 1988 contains the following popular quote by Durrell, often used in conservation awareness campaigns:

We hope that there will be fireflies and glow-worms at night to guide you and butterflies in hedges and forests to greet you.
We hope that your dawns will have an orchestra of bird song and that the sound of their wings and the opalescence of their colouring will dazzle you.
We hope that there will still be the extraordinary varieties of creatures sharing the land of the planet with you to enchant you and enrich your lives as they have done for us.
We hope that you will be grateful for having been born into such a magical world.
