= The Durrells =

British comedy-drama series

- Series 1 title card
- Also known as: The Durrells in Corfu
- Genre: Comedy drama
- Based on: Corfu trilogy by Gerald Durrell
- Written by: Simon Nye
- Theme music composer: Ruth Barrett
- Country of origin: United Kingdom
- Original language: English
- No. of series: 4
- No. of episodes: 26

Production
- Executive producers: Lee Morris; Sally Woodward Gentle; Simon Nye
- Producer: Christopher Hall
- Cinematography: Julian Court, James Aspinall
- Running time: 47 minutes
- Production companies: Sid Gentle Films; Masterpiece co-production

Original release
- Network: ITV
- Release: 3 April 2016 – 12 May 2019

Related
- My Family and Other Animals (1987); My Family and Other Animals (2005)

The Durrells (known in North America as The Durrells in Corfu) is a British comedy-drama television series loosely based on Gerald Durrell's trilogy of memoirs about his family's four years (1935–1939) on the Greek island of Corfu. It aired on ITV from 3 April 2016 to 12 May 2019. The series is written by Simon Nye, directed by Steve Barron and Roger Goldby, and produced by Christopher Hall. Lee Durrell, Gerald Durrell's widow and director of the Durrell Wildlife Conservation Trust, acted as consultant. The series was partly filmed on location in Corfu, as well as at Ealing Studios and Twickenham Studios in London.

== Premise ==
The series begins in 1935, when Louisa Durrell suddenly announces that she and her four children will move from Bournemouth to the Greek island of Corfu. Her husband died some years earlier and the family is experiencing financial problems. A struggle ensues as the family adapts to life on the island and a shortage of money. Despite a lack of electricity and of modern sewage systems, Corfu proves to be a cheap and earthly paradise.

== Cast and characters ==
Character	Portrayed by	Series 1	Series 2	Series 3	Series 4	Duration	# appearances
Louisa Durrell	Keeley Hawes	Main	Main	Main	Main	2016–2019	26
Gerry Durrell	Milo Parker	Main	Main	Main	Main	2016–2019	26
Larry Durrell	Josh O'Connor	Main	Main	Main	Main	2016–2019	26
Margo Durrell	Daisy Waterstone	Main	Main	Main	Main	2016–2019	26
Leslie Durrell	Callum Woodhouse	Main	Main	Main	Main	2016–2019	26
Spiros Halikiopoulos	Alexis Georgoulis	Main	Main	Main	Main	2016–2019	26
Lugaretzia	Anna Savva	Main	Main	Main	Main	2016–2019	26
Theo Stephanides	Yorgos Karamihos	Main	Main	Main	Main	2016–2019	26
Florence Petrides	Lucy Black	Recurring	Recurring	Recurring	Recurring	2016–2019	21
Dr. Petrides	Alexis Conran	Recurring	Recurring	Recurring	Recurring	2016–2019	9
Sven Lundblad	Ulric von der Esch	Recurring	Recurring	Recurring	Recurring	2016–2019	11
Pavlos	Nikos Orestis Chaniotakis	Guest	Recurring	Guest	Guest	2016–2019	6
Countess Mavrodaki	Leslie Caron	Recurring	Guest	Guest		2016–2019	6
Aunt Hermione	Barbara Flynn	Guest	Guest	Recurring	Guest	2016–2018	5
Max	Maximilian Befort	Recurring	Recurring			2016–2017	3
Donald	Ben Hall	Recurring	Recurring			2016–2017	7
Captain Creech	James Cosmo	Recurring		Guest	Guest	2016–2019	4
Prudence	Felicity Montagu	Guest		Guest	Recurring	2016–2019	4
Geoffrey	Jeff Rawle	Guest		Guest	Recurring	2016–2019	4
Nancy	Lizzy Watts	Recurring				2016	3
Alexia	Hara-Joy Ermidi	Recurring				2016	3
Dennis	Jeremy Swift	Recurring				2016	4
Angel	Jamie Ward	Recurring				2016	3
Hugh Jarvis	Daniel Lapaine		Recurring			2017	6
Vasilia Prifona	Errika Bigiou		Recurring			2017	5
Zoltan	Merch Husey		Guest	Recurring	Guest	2017–2019	7
Henry Miller	Trevor White			Recurring		2018	2
Daphne Likourgou	Elli Tringou			Recurring	Recurring	2018–2019	8
Galini	Olivia Lebedeva-Alexopoulou			Recurring	Recurring	2018–2019	6
Basil	Miles Jupp			Recurring	Main	2018–2019	8
Countess De Torro	Sarah Crowden				Recurring	2019	2
Lazaros Vangelatos	Constantin Symsiris				Recurring	2019	1

== Episodes ==
Series	Episodes	Originally released		Average viewership (in millions)
Series	Episodes	First released	Last released	Average viewership (in millions)
1	6	3 April 2016	8 May 2016	7.28
2	6	23 April 2017	28 May 2017	6.21
3	8	18 March 2018	6 May 2018	5.70
4	6	7 April 2019	12 May 2019	4.75

=== Series 1 (2016) ===
1935

No. overall	No. in series	Title	Directed by	Written by	Original release date	UK viewers (millions)
1	1	"Episode 1"	Steve Barron	Simon Nye	3 April 2016	8.81 (Note: 28-day data: 7,247,000 on ITV, 1,218,000 on ITV HD and 343,000 on ITV +1)
Drawn by the island of Corfu's distinct contrast with Britain, Bournemouth widow Louisa Durrell uproots her aimless and dysfunctional family. Upon arrival, welcoming local, Spiros, helps them rent a house and hire a maid, Lugaretzia. The family adapts to the austere living conditions and Louisa fears she has failed as a mother due to her children's selfish and unruly behaviour. Gerry befriends Theo, a fellow animal lover, and the duo gather an ever-growing menagerie. Leslie has a penchant for firearms, but his enthusiasm wanes when he falls for a girl. Margo discovers the local community's less-than-favourable attitudes toward women. Larry's attempt at matchmaking for his mother ends poorly. Little by little, the family settles into their new home.
2	2	"Episode 2"	Steve Barron	Simon Nye	10 April 2016	7.69 (Note: 28-day data: 6,076,000 on ITV, 1,241,000 on ITV HD and 372,000 on ITV +1)
The house is in disrepair and the family struggles to eat, so Louisa sends her children out foraging. A despondent Margo suffers from unrequited love and middling advice from her brothers. Gerry continues to disregard education and acquires a litter of puppies to save them from being killed. Larry disappears for days while partying with his friends, Max and Donald. While hungover, Larry tries to go hunting and is injured. Theo, Florence (the wife of a doctor), and Swedish ex-pat Sven work together to perform an emergency appendectomy on Larry. Spiros hounds the bank into giving Louisa money. Sven refuses payment from Louisa for the surgery.
3	3	"Episode 3"	Steve Barron	Simon Nye	17 April 2016	7.58 (Note: 28-day data: 5,954,000 on ITV, 1,304,000 on ITV HD and 330,000 on ITV +1)
Louisa worries about Gerry's new friendship with a convict named Kosti. Attempting to investigate the cause of his imprisonment, Louisa finds the two stealing Countess Mavrodaki's goldfish and Kosti is arrested. Margo learns she is not cut out for working at the Petrides' surgery. Leslie's girlfriend leaves him for another man, and he gets into a bar fight with his romantic rival while drunk. Louisa goes to fetch Leslie from jail, and Spiros helps her get the charges of theft against Kosti dropped. When Louisa, Gerry, and Margo return the goldfish, the elderly Countess hires Margo to be her lady's companion and allows Gerry to keep the fish as a gift. Louisa learns Kosti's imprisonment is due to accidentally killing his wife.
4	4	"Episode 4"	Roger Goldby	Simon Nye	24 April 2016	7.14 (Note: 28-day data: 5,438,000 on ITV, 1,370,000 on ITV HD and 326,000 on ITV +1)
Louisa finds herself torn between two men, and uses a supposedly rejuvenated Captain Creech to make Sven jealous. Leslie is thrown out, which leads to a life of crime after being taken in by two local thugs (Manolis Emmanouel and Vangelis Diamantis). He ends up in court following accusations from a turkey farmer, culminating in an additional armed robbery charge. Margo is caught trying on one of the Countess's dresses to impress the gardener, leading her to worry about her job until the Countess surprisingly gifts her the dress. Meanwhile, Gerry mourns the death of one of his bats and is encouraged to set up a centre for scientific learning with the rest of his animals.
5	5	"Episode 5"	Roger Goldby	Simon Nye	1 May 2016	6.93 (Note: 28-day data: 5,300,000 on ITV, 1,261,000 on ITV HD and 364,000 on ITV +1)
A visit from some priggish relatives seems to deem the family's immigration to Corfu more temporary than first thought. Louisa's aunt's insistences that they return to England is made more demanding by the revelation of her relationship with Sven. Larry is despondent at the rejection of his novel by publishers. When he subdues himself into a life of labour, he discovers his ineptness. Margo tries to balance her devotion to the Countess with her growing adoration for the Countess's gardener. Gerry's plans to embark into the world of conservation are thrown into disarray by his attempts to feed his adopted baby owls.
6	6	"Episode 6"	Roger Goldby	Simon Nye	8 May 2016	6.58 (Note: 28-day data: 5,141,000 on ITV and 1,223,000 on ITV HD; 7 day data: 213,000 on ITV +1)
The family's concerns over Sven's true intentions are brought to light when Louisa realises that Sven's romantic feelings for her are merely a ruse to hide his homosexuality. Larry finds himself stuck when Nancy insists they must move to Britain together, while he is hesitant to leave his family behind. Leslie suffers an injury perusing Gerry's makeshift zoo, leading Gerry to question his future caging animals. Margo attempts to relieve the Countess of her agoraphobia by inviting her to the wedding party.

=== Series 2 (2017) ===
1936

No. overall	No. in series	Title	Directed by	Written by	Original release date	UK viewers (millions)
7	1	"Episode 1"	Steve Barron	Simon Nye	23 April 2017 (Note: The episode's world premiere date was at the BFI and Radio Times Television Festival on 8 April 2017.)	7.32
One year has passed, and Louisa is fed up with being poor; to satisfy their new contemptuous landlady Vasilia, who repossesses the family's chairs over non-payment of rent, she sets up a market stall, the failure of which at first is taken by delight by fellow Briton Hugh Jarvis, who proceeds to try and woo her after the family uses his olive-pressing services. Purveying homemade British food doesn't work at first, before Spiros' advice on how to approach the Greek boosts sales. However, news her produce has resulted in food poisoning in the local residents is not well-received, but after discovering Vasilia has contaminated their food due to perceiving Louisa as a rival in her attempts to repair a past relationship with Hugh, warns her off – and the whole situation absolves Larry of his chronic writer's block, using the situation as inspiration for his next novel. Meanwhile, Gerry becomes preoccupied with finding otters, and when his mission to get up close to one is foiled by its death in a trap, he resolves to set up an otter breeding programme, while he develops hatred towards work-inept Leslie after he inadvertently shoots dog Roger; acne prompts appearance concerns for Margo, who has gained a boyfriend in monk Pavlos, but is disheartened in learning of his vow of celibacy, and dabbles in exploring how to become a nun in response.
8	2	"Episode 2"	Steve Barron	Simon Nye	30 April 2017	6.61
After Gerry goes missing, Louisa feels she has become too complacent in her parenting and has let her family down, particularly Larry, who is feeling downcast at the lack of response following the publication of his novel. While she attempts to drum up support for Larry's novel by disseminating leaflets for a reading, she resolves to give Gerry a proper education by hiring Spiros as a tutor, who transpires to be more stringent in teaching as she thought. However, the book reading draws a marginal crowd, and Larry chides his mother for the failure, and her generally lacklustre parenting, both before and after he receives mail praising his novel; as a result of this and Gerry's magpies stealing pages of his next novel's manuscript, Larry makes the decision to leave home. Meanwhile, Leslie and Margo become swayed by alcohol, with Leslie dipping his toes into selling it by selling homemade liqueur using the monks' recipe, and Margo's determination to become a nun is bogged down by her too readily able to enjoy it. Gerry finds a female mate for his otter and is concerned when they struggle to procreate.
9	3	"Episode 3"	Steve Barron	Simon Nye	7 May 2017	6.32
A birthday party leaves Louisa with even more concerns about her advancing age, of which her family attempts to relieve her. Margo's acne exacerbates, while Leslie develops a passion for photography. Larry becomes tempted by Vasilia, to the family's dismay, and Gerry finds that his tutor's proclivity to teach can be easily distracted from. Louisa becomes concerned over Sven's new relationship with a woman and feels worried he is keeping up the ruse of being heterosexual; this draws Hugh's attention, and his intrusion into Sven's private life isn't well received.
10	4	"Episode 4"	Edward Hall	Simon Nye	14 May 2017	5.96
The Durrells find themselves shut in when a torrential rainstorm hits Corfu, and not only are the family dealing with the grumpiness emerging from Larry's affliction with the mumps, but the unusual Mrs. Haddock (arriving with Aunt Hermione), who claims she is able to be in contact with the dead, and offers to conduct a seance for Louisa to engage with her deceased husband. Donald's insistence in conducting his tutoring duties proves annoying to Gerry, while Leslie's aggravation grows as his indoor reclusion continues, and Margo's also, as her acne troubles remain unsolved.
11	5	"Episode 5"	Edward Hall	Simon Nye	21 May 2017	5.49
A hastily, and ill-advisedly, thrown-together cricket match does nothing to soothe relations between the factions of the Greek and the British ex-pats – Spiros and Hugh, to be more specific – and actually works to exacerbate them. Larry is determined to use his Britishness to repel Vasilia (who is determined that the two of them marry), who at first finds his attempts charming, but her capricious nature gets the better of her and purposely kisses Hugh in full view of Louisa, prompting her to develop doubts over the future of their relationship, and Hugh, in a desperate effort to keep her, speaks of his intention that they should move back home to the United Kingdom together. Meanwhile, Gerry finds teasing Donald with in-efficacious methods of winning over Margo a welcome distraction from his persistent attitude they must work.
12	6	"Episode 6"	Edward Hall	Simon Nye	28 May 2017	5.57
Three different children are born as a fraught Leslie is on hand to help Lugaretzia's daughter give birth, Louisa aids with Florence's, and Gerry is overwhelmed with exuberance at the prospect of some otter cubs – all of which, as well as Corfu's rich culture and wildlife, helps Louisa realise she should refuse to fulfil Hugh's wish for the two of them to return to the United Kingdom. Hugh, however, finds himself in a more dangerous situation, as Vasilia, in a last-ditch attempt to win him back, and in a frantic displeasing at his choosing of Louisa, stabs him, and flees; Larry turns up at her doorstep for one last liaison, and she rejects him, adding more disappointment to his day as he later discovers he has missed everything exciting, an opinion soon put to rest when Donald, prior to leaving Corfu, engages in a fight with Margo's conceited new lover, Zoltan.

=== Series 3 (2018) ===
1937

A third series was confirmed to be in production by writer Simon Nye at the BFI and Radio Times Television Festival on 8 April 2017. He described the third series as having "some exotic new animals", and that production would begin in three weeks' time, upon Keeley Hawes's arrival in Corfu for filming. It is set in 1937.

No. overall	No. in series	Title	Directed by	Written by	Original release date	UK viewers (millions)
13	1	"Episode 1"	Roger Goldby	Simon Nye	18 March 2018	7.03
While Larry languishes in despondence following the antipathy-inducing news of Aunt Hermione's impending arrival – and the suspected breaking of his leg – Louisa is determined to relieve Leslie of at least two of his three girlfriends, but this falls into difficulty when different members of the family prefer a different girl – and invite each to tea at the same time. Meanwhile, Gerry's adoption of flamingoes arrives with Louisa's disapproval, who believes they have too many animals to begin with, and Margo takes up soap sculpturing while looking for a hobby. Theo diversifies from animal studies into human X-rays, while Florence struggles – becoming irascible and exhausted – after the birth of her son.
14	2	"Episode 2"	Roger Goldby	Simon Nye	25 March 2018	6.21
Louisa's worries her previous "birds and the bees" talks with Leslie were insufficient are confirmed when she discovers he has impregnated Daphne, one of his three girlfriends. As a result, Leslie is presented with the potentiality of a wife; Daphne's father orders him by gunpoint to marry her – and loses a girlfriend he loves in Dionisia. Meanwhile, the family's exposure to a more genial – and multiple-suitored – Aunt Hermione ends curtailed, with her death eliciting baseless fears of her bedroom being haunted by her "restless soul" and that the family should slay a goat as a sacrifice. Margo's new vocation as an assistant to Theo's radiography and X-ray endeavours and to Florence's motherhood is disturbed by her ex-boyfriend Zoltan, who is persistent in his attempts to win her back, all while organising a memorial service for her late aunt, which incorporates a rather vociferous imitation of a Hawaiian tradition. Larry volunteers to accompany Louisa back to Britain for Aunt Hermione's burial, while Gerry's new hobby, staring at a wall of insects and small creatures (and waiting for one to eat another), invites intrigue – exhausting at that – from the rest of the family.
15	3	"Episode 3"	Roger Goldby	Simon Nye	1 April 2018	5.39
Larry and Louisa arrive in Britain for Aunt Hermione's funeral, with Larry easily drawn into the welcoming, ideal lifestyle of a Bohemian fan and his housemates, and becomes disconcerted when Louisa's arrival plunges her into a lifestyle she is overly enthusiastic about the ideals of – which she later finds overwhelming, following a night of inebriation-fuelled antics with a prurient housemate leading to the misplacement of a necklace of Hermione's Louisa borrowed – which is later transpired to be extremely valuable. Back in Corfu, the rest of the family establish their own order, ignoring that Louisa set out for them – and that Spiros is enforcing, strongly with regards to controlling, albeit falteringly, Margo's access to boyfriend Zoltan; she later discovers this is due to Spiros' deep-rooted hatred of Turks (which Zoltan is). Lugaretzia takes the time to slack off when she sees the state the rest of the family has left the house in, while Leslie and Gerry become dedicated to different causes – protecting the family against a roaming gang and educating the Greek public on how to not mistreat donkeys. Serendipity strikes when Leslie is approached to join the police force, although later placed on shaky ground when his contraption to prevent a gang from encroaching on their home leads to Zoltan being shot. Meanwhile, Gerry ends up rescuing a beaten donkey from its abusive farmer.
16	4	"Episode 4"	Roger Goldby	Simon Nye	8 April 2018	5.56
Two visitors are invited into the Durrell family home: Larry's friend Jeejeebuoy, who is misconstrued at first to be a royal, and the second a destitute and dejected Captain Creech. They offer polarised opinions when it comes to Louisa's drinking, with Jeejee cautioning her on her doing so excessively, while Creech actively encourages it. This plays to Gerry's amusement after an interview at the local school – sought after Louisa is disappointed by Gerry's lack of work as an autodidact – ends in rejection due to Louisa's drunken state failing to make a good first impression. Leslie faces a dilemma when he discovers Daphne's father is spearheading a cigarette smuggling racket, while Larry's adventures aboard Creech's boat – hindered by his ineptness at being able to sail – lead him to a destination very far offshore. Guest Jeejee concerns the family with his persistent attempts at gaining enlightenment through fasting and going into a trance, which he later reduces to meditation to engage – and mollify – the family with. Theo and Gerry conclude their studies into whether diet changes affect a flamingo's pigmentation.
17	5	"Episode 5"	Niall MacCormick	Simon Nye	15 April 2018	5.59
Louisa grows jealous when Spiros begins spending time helping a new Italian family, the Ferraris, that has arrived on the island. Immediate relations between the families are fractious; nevertheless, the Durrells are roped into home-training the children, who had been dependent on their tending staff and late mother. However, the aloof behaviour of the Ferrari son, Paolo, soon draws concern, and the Durrells discover the reason behind the family's sudden departure from their home country; the tragic actions of the father his son was made to take as his own. Louisa and Spiros' relationship sours through a disagreement over his devotion to her family split with another, which they later become repentant over. Larry joins the local volunteer fire department, where his efforts to modernise it go awry. Theo acts as an inadvertent third wheel when Gerry is joined by a local girl on their search for vultures. Margo's new destiny is to gain the level of beauty bestowed upon one of the Ferrari daughters, and a suggestion to kiss the footwear of a dead saint to do so is fulfilled as a last resort - and results in the completely opposite effect.
18	6	"Episode 6"	Niall MacCormick	Simon Nye	22 April 2018	5.45
Kept inside by a mosquito infestation, Gerry's birthday celebrations do not go to plan, as Louisa insists on shoehorning in activities and stories to help relive, and elongate, the last moments of Gerry's childhood - to his chagrin, and with her ignorance towards his precocious maturity. Exasperated and frustrated, he protests, and in response, she decides to go overboard the opposite way, overly attempting to tend to his adulthood - replete with fallacies. While the adult guests enjoy the festivities, a certain number are kept hidden in corners of the house: concerns brew over an incongruously lugubrious Spiros, who plagues Larry with guitar-playing, reflecting his solemn mood (due to his wife deserting him), while Dr. Petrides' presence is taken advantage of, and Leslie and Daphne grow closer.
19	7	"Episode 7"	Niall MacCormick	Simon Nye	29 April 2018	5.50
Leslie is compelled to arrest Sven after the government imposes a crackdown on "immoral behaviour". In response, Larry breaks into the Countess's library to find material to defend Sven and challenge his detention; the aftermath leaves Leslie torn between his job and his family. Attempts to raise the spirits of a despondent, reclusive Spiros get mixed results, but ultimately - through persistence - achieve a beneficial one. Larry's author friend from London, Henry Miller, pays the Durrells a visit and quickly makes himself at home - through recrudescence to his preferred nude state - while Louisa's cousin Basil does so too, informing the family - contrary to what they expected - Hermione's estate is non-existent. Meanwhile, Gerry's continual vegetarianism results in his being told to cook his own food.
20	8	"Episode 8"	Niall MacCormick	Simon Nye	6 May 2018	4.90
Relationships and love are on the table when a travelling circus arrives in Corfu - between banding together to drum up ticket sales and partaking to replace disgruntled acts. Larry and contortionist Elena are in a relationship just minutes after first meeting; Margo enlists in a rather perilous performance to distract her from the worries regarding the reasons behind Zoltan's spurning of her; Daphne's reaction to a proposal leads to the revelation Leslie is not the father of her baby placing him in a fraught position; and Spiros and Louisa grow noticeably - and tantalisingly - closer. However, the prospects from each soon falter.

=== Series 4 (2019) ===
1939

No. overall	No. in series	Title	Directed by	Written by	Original release date	UK viewers (millions)
21	1	"Episode 1"	Roger Goldby	Simon Nye	7 April 2019	5.09
The family are finalising preparations to turn the home into a guest house, with a holidaying - and a nit-picky - Basil soon joined by a suspicious character who, irrespective of being a useful point of counsel to the Durrell children, transpires to be a wanted criminal whose acts were inspired by opposition to the rising tide of fascism across Europe; the family try to engineer an escape as the local police descend, with Spiros cooperating, despite the recent tension with the family, which they compel Louisa to resolve. Meanwhile, Margo earnestly delves into her new vocation of beauty and hairdressing - with mixed success - as Leslie rediscovers his hobby for firearms to distract from longing for Daphne, and Gerry begins planning for a zoo, with his primary efforts on training an owl that becomes a spectacle for the houseguests.
22	2	"Episode 2"	Roger Goldby	Simon Nye	14 April 2019	4.79
Louisa is feeling frustrated, being left as the sole woman in the household after Margo follows Larry in leaving, although not to as independent a way of living, but rather becoming a vexing houseguest for a fastidious and compulsively-organized Theo. Louisa's jealousy over Spiros remains unresolved, and in return, he accuses her of taking advantage of the litany of men in the household. The family's latest houseguest is the obnoxious sporting and war-addled Colonel Ribbidane, who pays Leslie to set up a wild boar hunt. Problems emerge, however: the land selected contains no wild boar, Leslie is imposed upon by Daphne to become a babysitter at short notice and he is obliged to bring the infant along to the hunt, and he has to delude the Colonel into thinking there are wild boar present by enlisting a secreted Basil to simulate boar grunts and calls in return for him being taught how to woo Louisa, with whom he confesses to being in love. The hunt is brought to a climax when Gerry—the only family member not considering fleeing the nest—and Galini's efforts to stop it go awry.
23	3	"Episode 3"	Roger Goldby	Simon Nye	21 April 2019	4.81
The family's decision to take a trip to visit Larry in Kalini is encumbered when an awkward first encounter between Louisa and Spiros' wife Dimitra leads to the troubled couple being invited along. Their tensions add to those already simmering, with a war of words with some locals using illegal fishing methods (which results in the destruction of Leslie's boat) and encountering the legendary Captain Creech, after goats invade their picnic, tipping off the disappointment of finding Larry has emigrated to Paris. Basil finds himself taken by Dimitra, and Gerry is delighted by the addition of two lemurs to his menagerie, which has already received unsolicited attention from two more eccentric houseguests. Meanwhile, Margo's England-bound drive to 'find herself' and improve her confidence lands at the doorstep of aunt Prudence and uncle Geoffrey, proving quite useful and inspiring by impressing the Dorset locals with her tales of her time in Corfu - as well as demonstrating its hairstyles - which leads to a local high-flying figure to hire her as a governess for her gloomy and ominous daughter.
24	4	"Episode 4"	Steve Barron	Simon Nye	28 April 2019	4.54
In April, the household's louche guests, and Spiros' and Louisa's growing closeness, is drawing negative attention from the locals, and the family's initial efforts to repair community relations do not muster any improvement in their attitude towards them, and so resort to displaying their respect for the Greek culture by attending a local festival and performing a traditional dance. Meanwhile, Leslie intervenes in Spiros' and Louisa's prospects by sending Basil to be company to Dimitra - although the result is not what he expected. In Dorset, Margo uplifts the spirits of her sullen pupil, Maud, via some cinema trips; however, the disturbing news delivered by a newsreel compels her to return to Corfu. Gerry is overcome with jealousy, diverting his concerns from his zoo towards Galini, whose attention is captured by another male friend and his new motorbike. In Paris, Larry is entertained by the postal ruminations of his family.
25	5	"Episode 5"	Steve Barron	Simon Nye	5 May 2019	4.56
Corfu is earnestly preparing for a visit from the King of Greece. The Durrells are keen to be a part of the welcoming committee, and given he will sail by their house, the family resolve to put on a display while hosting the royal courtiers. Leslie is appointed the new leader of the Boy Scouts, and is in charge of a performance for the king, but a rather rebellious, Nazi-sympathetic member produces trouble, as does Gerry, who leads the troop astray with his zoo. Louisa is drawn into the Basil-Dimitra affair debacle, and encourages him to leave; Spiros, however, uncovers the truth and disowns the family. Margo journeys back to Corfu in a cabin filled with passengers from across Europe, where the attitudes and histories of the time come to bear, and one brusque, opinionated passenger, Nikos, captures her attention. Larry lives a pained existence in Paris, where the threat of war is looming ever heavier.
26	6	"Episode 6"	Steve Barron	Simon Nye	12 May 2019	4.70
Larry returns, and as well as bringing along the news Europe is on the brink of war, ropes all and sundry into the new play he's hoping to perform about the family's experiences in Corfu, while compelled by the crackdown of freedom of speech to become a spy. Gerry is disheartened to learn he must dismantle his zoo and set his animals free with the family's future on Corfu uncertain. Margo makes clear her amorous intentions towards Nikos, although rather too publicly and prematurely, as Zoltan returns. Louisa is reunited with Spiros, but their renewed courtship is immediately placed in jeopardy, after she is compelled to return to England - following the news of Basil's killing in Albania due to being English makes her fear the nationalist attitude will spread to Corfu - without Spiros, who insists he cannot abandon his children and his country. Larry announces he will stay behind to help the spy effort.

== Reception ==
=== Critical reception ===
Reception to the first episode was positive, with Gerard O'Donovan (The Telegraph) calling it "a series that's not only sun-drenched and liberating, but also catches its source material's high good humour without labouring it and weaves an authentic sense of the innocent exoticism of the original", before awarding it four stars.

=== Viewership ===
The opening episode averaged just under 6.4 million people and was watched by 29% of the audience over the hour, including those watching on British television network ITV's +1 channel, and was the biggest drama launch of any channel so far in 2016 and the most-watched show of the day (including +1). Following a seven-day catch-up period, the figure aggregated to just under 8.2 million people. Citing the show as its "best rating new drama of the year and its highest rating new show since September 2014", ITV recommissioned the show for a second series on 15 April 2016. Over the course of the first series, ratings averaged out at 6.9 million viewers.

=== Awards and nominations ===
Year	Category	Award	Nominee	Result
2017	Best Actress	Broadcasting Press Guild Award	Keeley Hawes	Won
2017	Best Drama Series	BAFTA TV Award	The Durrells	Nominated
2017	Best Costume Design	BAFTA TV Award	Charlotte Holdich	Nominated
2017	Best Titles & Graphic Identity	BAFTA TV Award	Alex Maclean	Nominated
2017	Best Writer: Drama	BAFTA TV Award	Simon Nye	Nominated
2016	Best Production Design: Drama	RTS Craft & Design Award	Stevie Herbert	Won
2016	Best Graphic Design: Titles	RTS Craft & Design Award	Alex Maclean	Nominated

== Broadcast ==
Internationally, the series was acquired in Australia by the Seven Network and premiered on 24 August 2016. In the United States, PBS began airing the show, retitled as The Durrells in Corfu, on 16 October 2016 at 8 pm. The Durrells started screening in New Zealand on 26 October 2016 on Prime TV. In Canada, the Canadian Broadcasting Corporation began airing Series 1 on 13 September 2017. In Spain, the series has been acquired by the streaming platform Filmin. It was broadcast in France from 16 July 2017 on France 3 as La Folle Aventure des Durrell. The Arte network later screened the series in French (as The Durrells : une famille anglaise à Corfou) and German (as Die Durrells auf Korfu), as well as in English with optional subtitles.

The third series of The Durrells was announced by writer Simon Nye at the BFI and Radio Times Television Festival on 8 April 2017. It began filming in May 2017 and aired on ITV in the Northern Hemisphere in the spring of 2018.

A fourth series was announced by ITV on 22 June 2018, with filming scheduled for later in the year. It was transmitted between 8 April and 12 May 2019. This has been confirmed as the final series.

Keely Hawes presented an accompanying documentary for PBS Masterpiece series called The Durrells in Corfu - What the Durrells Did Next, ran 47 mins long.

== Home media ==
Series	Release date			
Series	Region 1/A	Region 2 (UK)	Region 2 (Germany)	Region 4
Single series
1	1 November 2016 (Note: Blu-ray and DVD)	23 May 2016	31 July 2020	11 December 2019
2	24 October 2017	29 May 2017	25 September 2020	11 December 2019
3	16 October 2018 (Note: DVD only)	14 May 2018	27 November 2020	20 November 2019
4	3 December 2019	20 May 2019	5 February 2021	13 November 2019
Multiple series sets
1 & 2	No release	29 May 2017	No release	No release
1–3	No release	14 May 2018	No release	No release
Complete	TBA	20 May 2019	TBA	13 November 2019

== See also ==
- Gerald Durrell's Corfu trilogy books:
  - My Family and Other Animals (1956)
  - Birds, Beasts, and Relatives (1969)
  - The Garden of the Gods (1978)
- My Family and Other Animals, a 1987 BBC series based on the book by the same name
- My Family and Other Animals, a 2005 BBC telemovie based on the book by the same name
