= Theodore Stephanides =

Greek-British doctor and biologist (1896–1983)

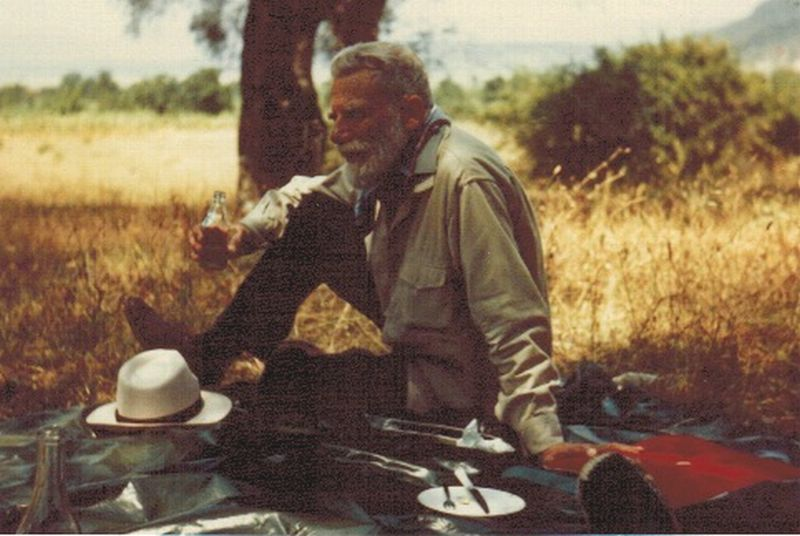
- Theodore Stephanides visiting Corfu with the BBC in 1967
- Born: Theodore Philip Stephanides; 21 January 1896; Bombay, British India
- Died: 13 April 1983 (aged 87); Kilburn, London
- Occupations: poet, author, translator, doctor, astronomer, naturalist, scientist, etc.
- Spouse: Mary Alexander
- Children: Alexia Stephanides-Mercouri
- Parent(s): Philip Stephanides and Caterina Ralli
- Family: Alexander Mercouris (grandson)

Theodore Philip Stephanides (Greek: Θεόδωρος Φίλιππος Στεφανίδης; 21 January 1896 – 13 April 1983) was a Greek-British doctor and polymath, best remembered as the friend and mentor of Gerald Durrell. He was also known as a naturalist, biologist, astronomer, poet, writer and translator.

Stephanides' autobiographical account of the Battle of Crete, Climax in Crete (1946), is still cited by military historians and his 1948 A Survey of the Freshwater Biology of Corfu and of Certain Other Regions of Greece is a definitive biological treatise on the freshwater life in Corfu.

He was portrayed in a number of books, including My Family and Other Animals by Gerald Durrell, Prospero's Cell by Lawrence Durrell, The Colossus of Maroussi by Henry Miller as well as in several movies and TV productions, and has four biological species named after him.

== Childhood in Bombay and Corfu ==
Theodore Philip Stephanides was born on 21 January 1896 in Bombay, British India (present-day India), to Philip (Philippos) Stephanides, a native of Thessaly, Ottoman Empire, and Caterina Ralli, of Greek descent, born and educated in London. Stephanides' father worked for a company that belonged to Ralli Brothers, a British family of Greek origin, while Stephanides' mother was part of that family. Stephanides spent his early years in Bombay, and since his family only spoke English at home, it was his first language.

In 1907, as Stephanides' father retired, the family moved first to Marseilles, France, and shortly afterwards to Rallis' estate in Corfu. It was only then that Stephanides began to learn Greek, at the age of 11. He would speak Greek with a strong British accent.

== World War I and the Greco-Turkish War (1919–1922) ==
Stephanides served as a gunner in the Greek army on the Macedonian front in 1917–1918. Following that, he participated in the Greco-Turkish War of 1919–1922. Subsequently, he would write Macedonian Medley; 1917–1918, an account of his participation in the Macedonian campaign, based on a diary he kept during that time. For 18 months, he served in a relatively calm and stable area, south of Ghevgheli and near the towns of Kilkis and Isvor. He often acted as a liaison with British and French units, owing to his knowledge of English and French.

In 1921–1922, Stephanides was detained and court-martialed for "insulting" King Constantine I of Greece, after he refused to take part in a December 1921 service which celebrated the king's return to Greece. The incident was caused by Stephanides' resentment with the Greek military authorities and his political views: he was a strong supporter of Eleftherios Venizelos, the prime-minister of Greece in 1910–1920, who was in conflict with Constantine I.

== 1920s: study of medicine in Paris, translation of poetry ==
After his demobilization, Stephanides moved to France, where he studied medicine at the University of Paris (specialization of radiology) between 1922 and 1928, one of his professors being Marie Curie. In 1929, he defended his Ph.D. thesis on microscopy techniques, at the same university.

While in Paris, Stephanides also practiced astronomy and was highly regarded by Camille Flammarion, a French astronomer. Stephanides' professional interest in astronomy dates back to as early as the summer of 1914, when he observed the Sun for two months and made 24 drawings of various groups of sunspots. For this research, he was made member of the French Astronomical Society in February 1915. Stephanides would continue making astronomical observations until the end of his life.

In the 1920s, Stephanides began his work as a translator of Greek poetry into English. In 1925 and 1926, he published two volumes of Greek poems belonging to Kostis Palamas and other modern Greek poets. These translations were coauthored with George Katsimbalis, the man portrayed in Henry Miller's novel The Colossus of Maroussi along with Stephanides himself and Lawrence Durrell. They met during World War I and would become lifelong friends and collaborators.

== 1930s: radiology practice in Corfu, meeting the Durrell family ==
Stephanides returned to Corfu in 1928. The same year, along with his friend Philoctetes Paramythiotis (1893–1996), Stephanides founded the first radiological laboratory of the Ionian Islands. They co-directed the X-ray unit until 1938, when Stephanides moved to Thessaloniki. A somewhat fictionalized account of Stephanides' work at the radiological laboratory appears in The Durrells series (season 3), with young Margo Durrell acting as his assistant.

In 1930, Stephanides married Mary Alexander, the granddaughter of a former British consul in Corfu. The couple had one child, Alexia Stephanides-Mercouri (1931–2018). Alexia was a close friend of Gerald Durrell in Corfu, and Stephanides hoped that the two would marry one day, but the outbreak of World War II ruined these plans. Alexia went on to marry Spyros Mercouris (1926–2018), the brother of Greek actress Melina Mercouri. They had two children, Pyrrhus and Alexander Mercouris.

Stephanides grew interested in freshwater biology in the 1930s. In 1936, following instructions from the Greek government, he started to work on his scientific magnum opus, a treatise on the freshwater biology of Corfu, which would be published in 1948. During his research, Stephanides discovered three microscopic water organisms, Cytherois stephanidesi, Thermocyclops stephanidesi and Schizopera stephanidesi.

In the summer of 1935, Stephanides made the acquaintance of the Durrell family, who had recently moved to Corfu. He quickly developed a close friendship with two of the Durrell brothers, Lawrence and Gerald, who would remain his lifelong friends. As Gerald Durrell would later recall, Stephanides produced an enormous effect upon him, "a budding naturalist of ten" at that time, helping him develop his exploration skills. "Not many young naturalists have the privilege of having their footsteps guided by a sort of omnipotent, benign and humorous Greek god," wrote Durrell.

The two Durrell brothers would feature Stephanides in their memoirs of the time they spent in Corfu: Gerald in his Corfu trilogy (which includes the bestseller My Family and Other Animals, first published in 1956), and Lawrence in Prospero's Cell (first edition: 1945). Stephanides, too, would write memoirs on that period, which consist mostly of reminiscences about Lawrence Durrell and his then-wife, Nancy. Fragments from them were published by the Deus Loci journal in the 1970s and 1980s, while the full version appeared in 2011 under the title Corfu Memoirs in the collection of Stephanides' works Autumn Gleanings.

During 1938 and 1939, Stephanides participated in the anti-malaria campaign in Salonica and Cyprus, organized by the Rockefeller Foundation. Earlier, in 1933, Stephanides drew up a report on anti-malaria measures to be performed in Corfu, based on directives from the Corfiot health authorities.

As Stephanides came back to Corfu in 1939, for a brief period, he made an acquaintance with Henry Miller, who later remembered: "Theodore is the most learned man I have ever met, and a saint to boot."

At the outbreak of World War II, Stephanides had to leave Corfu again and would only return there on rare occasions. Nevertheless, he would keep fond memories of the island and the influence it produced on him.

== World War II, memoir Climax in Crete ==
During World War II, being a British citizen, Stephanides served as a medical officer (lieutenant, and later major) in the Royal Army Medical Corps of the British Army in continental Greece, Crete, the Sahara and Sicily. In May 1941, Stephanides was in Crete with the Allied forces during the German invasion. As the Allies were retreating across the island to be evacuated by sea, Stephanides walked in boots several sizes too large, which made him limp for some time after that. During the last stage of their long and exhausting march, he and another medical officer took charge of a group of about one hundred walking wounded, and they had to walk in open under the protection of the Red Cross flag, without any weapons or even steel helmets. Eventually, they succeeded in reaching the embarkation beach and were evacuated by H.M.A.S. Perth to Alexandria.

In 1946, Stephanides published Climax in Crete, an eyewitness account of the Battle of Crete. Lawrence Durrell wrote a foreword to it, where he remarked: "For clearness, accuracy, and unselfconsciousness [this account] is quite fit to rank beside the compilations of any modern Purchas... It evokes the atmosphere of Greece and Crete during the German attack with a fidelity I have not seen elsewhere equalled; and to those who were there it will no doubt come as a refreshment after the scrappy sensational prose works of the professional journalists." Lawrence's brother, Gerald Durrell, mentioned that Climax in Crete was "one of the best war books written". Alan G. Thomas also praised it, saying that it was "one of the best individual accounts of a campaign written from the human point of view". Climax in Crete is quoted extensively by English military historian Antony Beevor in his book Crete: The Battle and the Resistance.

Stephanides' parents were killed in Corfu during the 1943 German bombing of the island, while his wife Mary and daughter Alexia had moved to England in 1939 and stayed safe until the end of the war, living with the Durrells in Bournemouth for some time.

After his evacuation from Crete, Stephanides served in the Western Desert for two years, and then, in the summer of 1943, he took part in the Allied invasion of Sicily. Stephanides' experiences in the Western Desert are described in his two memoirs entitled Western Desert Scramble and Western Desert and Beyond, which are kept, along with Macedonian Medley; 1917–1918, in the Imperial War Museum in London. Neither of these three memoirs have seen print yet, although plans exist to publish Macedonian Medley; 1917–1918.

== Postwar period: moving to London ==
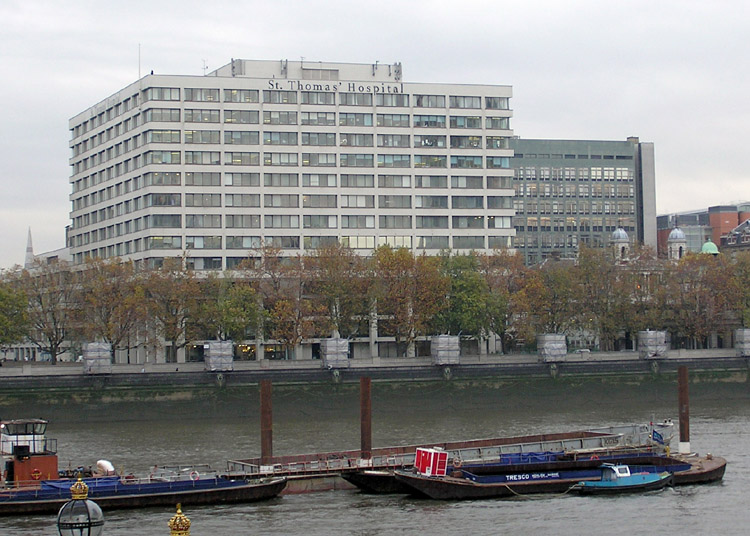
St Thomas' Hospital in London where Stephanides worked as an assistant radiologist after World War II.

Shortly after the end of World War II, Stephanides retired from the British Army and reunited with his family in London. In 1947, he and Mary divorced after 17 years of living together.

In 1945–1961, Stephanides worked as an Assistant Radiologist at St. Thomas' Hospital, Lambeth district of London.

The publication of Climax in Crete in 1946 was followed by two scientific works: The Microscope and the Practical Principles of Observation (1947), a detailed guide to microscope operation and use, and the seminal A Survey of the Freshwater Biology of Corfu and of Certain Other Regions of Greece (1948). In 2012, Peter G. Sutton, a British biologist and science teacher, would highly praise A Survey, saying, among other things, that it "laid the foundation for future naturalists to study the aquatic fauna of Corfu". Sutton was "astonished by the fact that so many pathways of knowledge... must all proceed through [Stephanides'] original work on the freshwater biology of the island, or risk error". He also mentioned that while Stephanides' books, scientific collections and most of his notes were destroyed during World War II in air attacks on Corfu town, A Survey was saved by good fortune.

In July 1967, Stephanides came to Corfu, helping Gerald Durrell and Christopher Parsons complete the BBC travel documentary The Garden of the Gods. Both Stephanides and Durrell appeared in the film.

Owing to his meticulousness, excellent knowledge of Corfu and Greece, and strong command of both the English and Greek languages, Stephanides was asked by the Durrell brothers to proofread a number of their books, such as Gerald's My Family and Other Animals or Lawrence's Prospero's Cell, Pope Joan and The Greek Islands.

After he published two collections of his own poems entitled The Golden Face (1965) and The Cities of the Mind (1969), Stephanides was highly praised as a poet. In 1973, he published a third collection of his poems, Worlds in a Crucible. A fourth collection of Stephanides' poems, Autumn Gleanings, written apparently in the 1970s, would be published posthumously in 2011.

In addition, Stephanides continued to translate the poetry of Kostis Palamas in collaboration with George Katsimbalis. As mentioned by Katsimbalis, his own contribution was not really necessary, since Stephanides understood Greek well enough. Stephanides would also work single-handedly, translating, among other things, the national Greek poem Erotocritos (published posthumously in 1984 and dedicated to Lawrence and Gerald Durrell) and dozens of short poems by Sappho and other Ancient Greek authors (year of publication: 2015). Only about half of his translations have been published so far.

Marios-Byron Raizis, a Greek-American Byronist and Romanticist, greatly praised Stephanides' talent as a poet and translator, stating: "Had Theodore Stephanides been less Greek at heart, and had he anglicised his father's surname as Stephenson or Stevens, I believe that his fame as an English poet and translator would have been part of the English literary culture we all love, study, and celebrate today."

In 1973, Stephanides published Island Trails, a half-fictional account of Corfu and other Ionian Islands, basically a collection of Greek folklore collected by him over the years. It was prefaced by Gerald Durrell.

On 15 February 1983, Stephanides appeared as a "very special surprise guest" in the UK TV programme This is Your Life (aired on 23 February 1983) with Gerald Durrell as the "subject". This proved to be the last time Stephanides and Durrell saw each other.

Stephanides died peacefully in his sleep on 13 April 1983 in the Kilburn district of London.

== Legacy ==
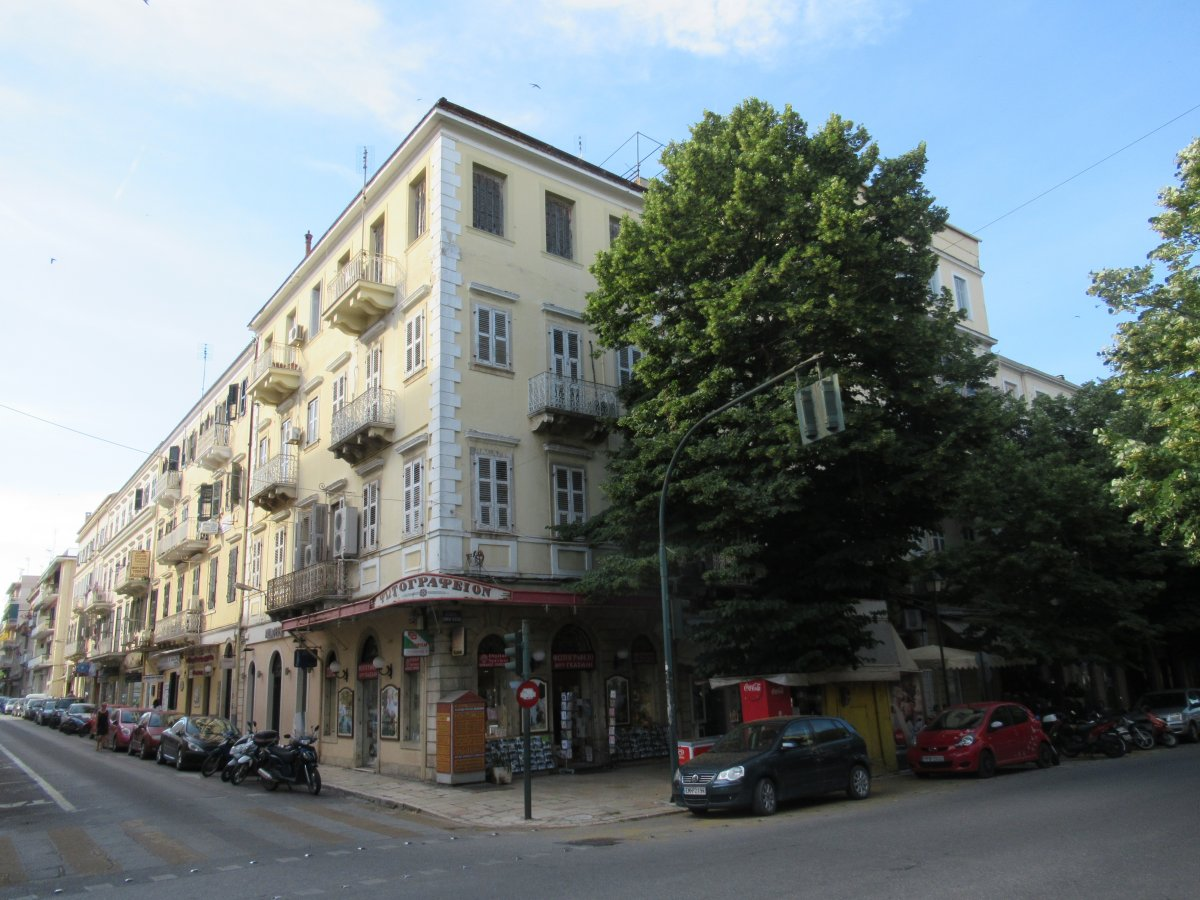
Building in Corfu town (22 Mantzarou Street), where Stephanides had his laboratory and consulting rooms in the 1930s.

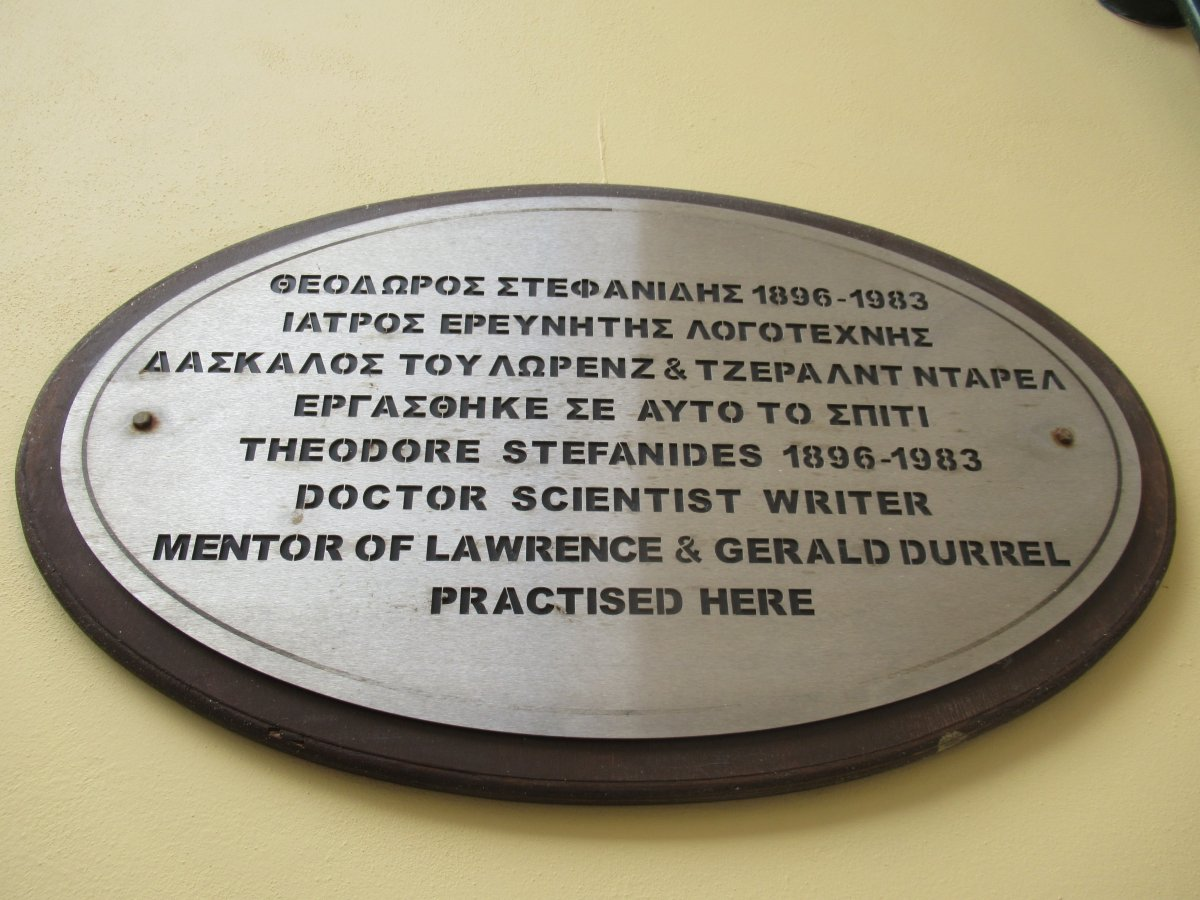
Memorial plaque to Stephanides in Corfu town on 22 Mantzarou Street.

Stephanides has four biological species named after him: Cytherois stephanidesi, Thermocyclops stephanidesi, Schizopera stephanidesi and Arctodiaptomus stephanidesi, which are microscopic freshwater crustaceans discovered by various researchers in the 1930s.

Félix Chemla Lamèch, a French meteorologist and selenographer, proposed naming the lunar crater Römer A after Stephanides, but this proposal was not accepted by the IAU.

Lawrence Durrell dedicated The Greek Islands (1978) and Gerald Durrell Birds, Beasts and Relatives (1969) and The Amateur Naturalist (1982) to Stephanides during his lifetime, the latter reading:

This book is for Theo (Dr Theodore Stephanides), my mentor and friend, without whose guidance I would have achieved nothing.

On 25 May 2011, a plaque in honor of Stephanides was unveiled in Corfu town on the building where he had his laboratory and consulting rooms in the 1930s (22 Mantzarou Street). The text is in Greek and English, the English text reading:

Theodore Stephanides, 1896–1983, doctor, scientist, writer, mentor of Lawrence and Gerald Durrell, practised here.

== Selected bibliography ==
- Poems (original work by Kostis Palamas in Greek, translation to English, co-author George Katsimbalis (Hazell, Watson and Viney, 1925)
- Modern Greek Poems (selection and translation from Greek into English, co-author George Katsimbalis) (1926)
- Climax in Crete (an account of the Battle of Crete) (Faber and Faber, 1946)
- The Microscope and the Practical Principles of Observation (Faber and Faber, 1947)
- A Survey of the Freshwater Biology of Corfu and of Certain Other Regions of Greece, Practika of the Hellenic Hydrobiological Institute, No. 2 (2), pp. 11–263 (1948)
- "The influence of the antimosquito fish, Gambusia affinis, on the natural fauna of a Corfu lakelet" (technical article), Practika of the Hellenic Hydrobiological Institute, No. 9, pp. 3–6 (1964)
- The Golden Face (collection of poems) (Fortune Press, London, 1965)
- Cities of the Mind (collection of poems) (Fortune Press, London, 1969)
- Three Poems (original work by Kostis Palamas in Greek, translation into English, co-author George Katsimbalis) (self-published, 1969)
- Worlds in a Crucible (collection of poems) (Mitre Press, 1973)
- Island Trails (semi-fictional account of Corfu and other Ionian Islands) (London: Macdonald, 1973)
- The Twelve Words of the Gipsy (original work by Kostis Palamas in Greek, translation into English, co-author George Katsimbalis) (Oasis Books, London, 1974)
- A Hundred Voices (original work by Kostis Palamas in Greek, translation to English, co-author George Katsimbalis) (self-published, 1976)
- Karaghiozis and the Enchanted Tree: A Modern Greek Shadow-Play Comedy (Greek Gazette, 1979)
- The King's Flute (original work by Kostis Palamas in Greek, translation to English, co-author George Katsimbalis) (Kostis Palamas Institute, 1982)
- Erotocritos (original work by Vitsentzos Kornaros, translated from Greek to English) (Papazissis, 1984)
- Kostis Palamas: A Portrait and an Appreciation. Including Iambs and Anapaests and Ascraeus (partly original work by Kostis Palamas in Greek, translation into English, co-authors Theophanis G. Stavrou, Constantine A. Trypanis, George Katsimbalis) (Nostos Books, 1985)
- Autumn Gleanings: Corfu Memoirs and Poems (original texts apparently written in the 1970s; edited by Richard Pine, Lindsay Parker, James Gifford and Anthony Hirst) (Durrell School of Corfu & International Lawrence Durrell Society, 2011)
- Sweet-Voiced Sappho: Some of the Extant Poems of Sappho of Lesbos and Other Ancient Greek Poems (translated by Theodore Stephanides, edited by Anthony Hirst) (Colenso Books, London, 2015)
- To Chryso Prosopeio – The Golden Face (Colenso Books, London, 2019)
- Karaghiozis: Three Modern Greek Shadow-Play Comedies (translated by Theodore Stephanides) (Colenso Books, London, 2020)

== Portrayals ==
- In the BBC 10-episode TV series My Family and Other Animals (1987), Stephanides is played by Christopher Godwin.
- In the BBC 90-minute film My Family and Other Animals (2005), Stephanides is played by Chris Langham.
- In the ITV (Television Network) drama series The Durrells (2016–2019), Stephanides is played by Yorgos Karamihos.
