= My Family and Other Animals (film) =

2005 British film

- Based on: My Family and Other Animals by Gerald Durrell
- Written by: Simon Nye
- Directed by: Sheree Folkson
- Starring: Eugene Simon; Imelda Staunton; Chris Langham; Omid Djalili; Matthew Goode; Russell Tovey; Tamzin Merchant
- Theme music composer: Nicholas Hooper
- Country of origin: United Kingdom
- Original language: English

Production
- Running time: 90 minutes
- Production company: 2 Entertain

Original release
- Release: 27 December 2005

My Family and Other Animals is a 2005 television film written by Simon Nye and directed by Sheree Folkson. The film is based on the 1956 autobiographical book of the same title written by Gerald Durrell, in which he describes a series of anecdotes relating to his family's stay on Corfu from 1935–1939, when he was aged 10–14.

== Plot ==
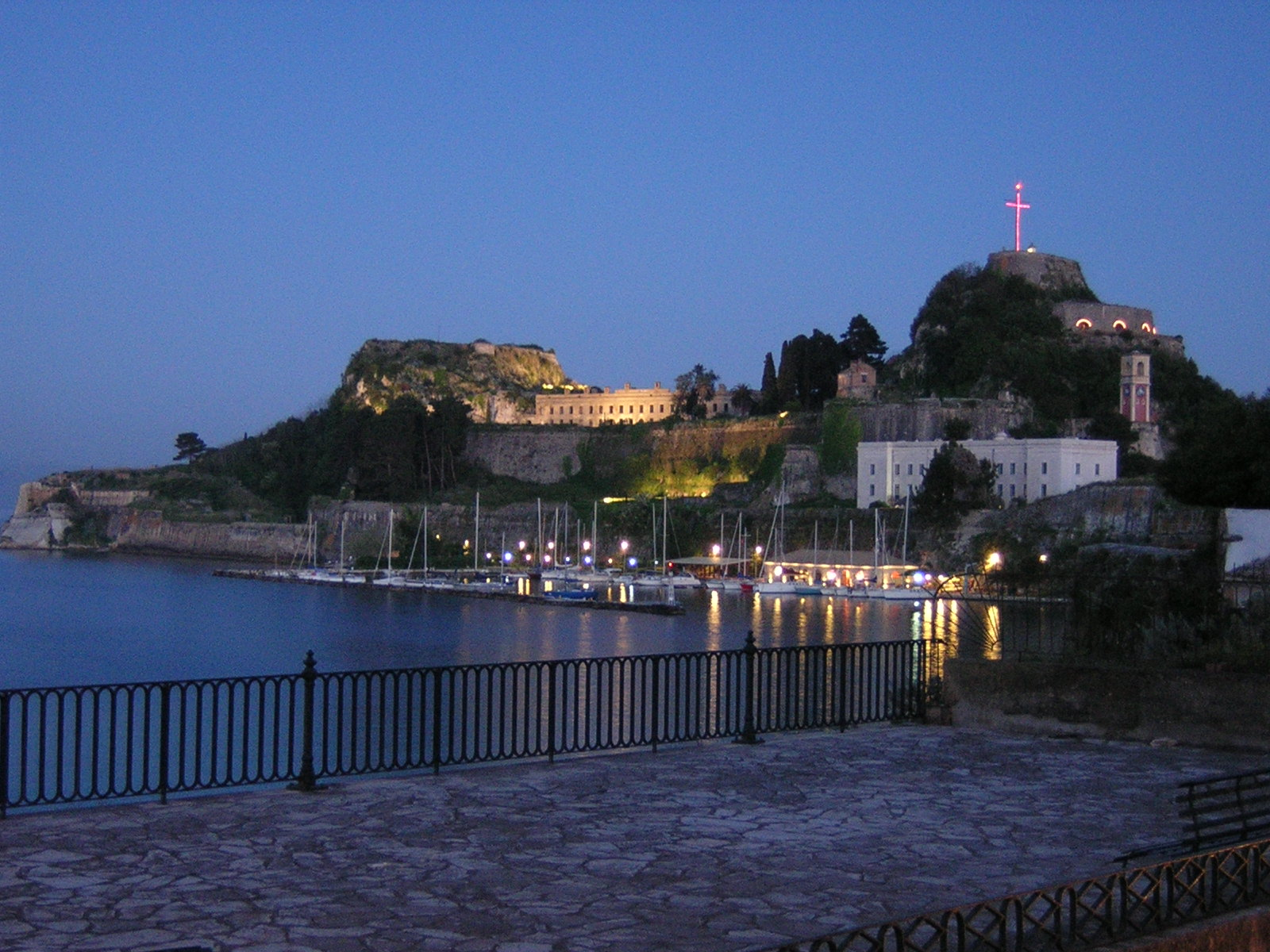
Corfu, the setting for the film

My Family and Other Animals tells the story of the Durrell family, Lawrence Durrell, Leslie Durrell, Margaret Durrell and Gerald Durrell, as well as their mother Louisa Durrell, as they spend five years (1935–1939) on the Greek island of Corfu. The family reside in a series of villas, and spend their time indulging in their varying interests. Gerald develops his passion for wildlife, his mother spends her time cooking and worrying about everyone else; Larry writes and annoys the entire family with high-brow guests and unhelpful suggestions; Leslie develops his passion for ballistics and sailing, whilst Margo sunbathes and enchants the local young men.

== Cast ==
- Eugene Simon as Gerald Durrell
- Imelda Staunton as Louisa Durrell
- Chris Langham as Theodore Stephanides
- Omid Djalili as Spiro
- Matthew Goode as Larry Durrell
- Russell Tovey as Leslie Durrell
- Tamzin Merchant as Margo Durrell
- Tom Goodman-Hill as Peter
- Alexander Armstrong as Narrator/Adult Gerry (voiceover)

== See also ==
- Gerald Durrell's Corfu trilogy books:
  - My Family and Other Animals (1956)
  - Birds, Beasts, and Relatives (1969)
  - The Garden of the Gods (1978)
- My Family and Other Animals (1987), a BBC 10-episode TV series based on Gerald Durrell's book by the same name
- The Durrells (2016), an ITV drama television series loosely based on the Corfu trilogy
