= My Family and Other Animals =

1956 autobiography by Gerald Durrell

- First edition
- Author: Gerald Durrell
- Language: English
- Series: Gerald Durrell's Corfu Saga
- Subject: Gerald Durrell's life in Corfu
- Genre: Autobiography
- Published: 1956 Rupert Hart-Davis
- Publication place: United Kingdom
- ISBN: 0755111974 (hardcover edition); ISBN 0141321873 (paperback edition)
- Followed by: Birds, Beasts, and Relatives, The Garden of the Gods

My Family and Other Animals (1956) is an autobiographical book by British naturalist Gerald Durrell. It tells in an exaggerated and sometimes fictionalised way of the years that he lived as a child with his siblings and widowed mother on the Greek island of Corfu between 1935 and 1939. It describes the life of the Durrell family in a humorous manner, and explores the fauna of the island. It is the first and most well-known of Durrell's Corfu trilogy, which also includes Birds, Beasts, and Relatives (1969) and The Garden of the Gods (1978).

Durrell had already written several successful books about his trips collecting animals in the wild for zoos when he published My Family and Other Animals in 1956. Its comic exaggeration of the foibles of his family – including his eldest brother Lawrence Durrell, who became a celebrated novelist and poet – and his heartfelt appreciation of the natural world made it very successful. Durrell was able to found the Jersey Zoological Park (now known as the Durrell Wildlife Park) in the Channel Islands. He also became known as a novel-writer and television personality. His books helped stimulate the development of tourism in Corfu.

== Summary ==
The book is an autobiographical account of five years in the childhood of naturalist Gerald Durrell, aged 10 at the start of the saga, of his family, pets and life during a sojourn on Corfu. The book is divided into three sections, marking the three villas where the family lived on the island. Gerald is the youngest in a family consisting of their widowed mother, writer and eldest son Larry, the gun-mad Leslie, and diet-obsessed sister Margo together with Roger the dog. They are fiercely protected by their taxi-driver friend Spiro (Spiro "Americano" Halikiopulos) and mentored by the polymath Dr. Theodore Stephanides who provides Gerald with his education in natural history. Other human characters, chiefly eccentric, include Gerald's private tutors, the artistic and literary visitors Larry invites to stay, and the local people who befriend the family.

== Background ==
The book was written in 1955 in Bournemouth, where Durrell was recuperating from a severe attack of jaundice. Whereas Durrell often claimed to find writing a chore, this book was different: his first wife Jacquie recalled: "Never have I known Gerry work as he did then; it seemed to pour out of him". Durrell maintained that "he had started off like a good cook with three ingredients which, delicious alone, were even better in combination: namely, the spellbinding landscape of a Greek island before tourism succeeded in spoiling it for tourists; his discovery of and friendship with the wild denizens, both animal and Greek, of that island; and the eccentric conduct of all members of his family." The book was an instant success.

Although My Family and Other Animals is presented as autobiographical, the events described are not always true. In particular, Larry lived in another part of Corfu with his first wife Nancy Durrell, whom Gerald does not mention at all. The chronology of events as they occur in the book is also inaccurate, and the reason for the Durrells' departure from Corfu (imminent outbreak of World War II) is not given; instead, it is implied that the family returned to England for the sake of Gerald's education.

However, the book does succeed in preserving the impressions of ten- to fourteen-year-old Gerald extremely vividly and with a great deal of light-hearted humour. Despite the omissions and inaccuracies, Lawrence Durrell commented: "This is a very wicked, very funny, and I'm afraid rather truthful book – the best argument I know for keeping thirteen-year-olds at boarding-schools and not letting them hang about the house listening in to conversations of their elders and betters".

The book was first published by Rupert Hart-Davis Ltd in 1956, and in paperback by Penguin Books in 1959, and has remained in print ever since.

== Adaptations ==
=== Television and film ===
==== 1987 ====
In 1987, the book was made into a ten-part BBC television series, My Family and Other Animals, written by Charles Wood and directed by Peter Barber-Fleming. It starred Hannah Gordon as Louisa Durrell and Brian Blessed as Spiro Amerikanos, with Darren Redmayne playing the young Gerry. Nigel Marven of the Natural History Unit, Bristol was responsible for the animals side of the production; Denis McKeown, then PhD student in Psychology University of Sussex, did the training of the famous pigeon Quasimodo in the series. The whistling for the theme tune was provided by Ken Barrie, who was the original voice of the children's television character Postman Pat.

==== 2005 ====
In 2005, it was adapted by the BBC as a 90-minute film, My Family and Other Animals, starring Eugene Simon as the young Gerry, Imelda Staunton as Mrs. Durrell and Omid Djalili as Spiro. This adaptation was written by Simon Nye.

==== 2016–2019 ====
On 3 April 2016 ITV began running the six-part series The Durrells, also adapted by Simon Nye. Loosely based on the Corfu trilogy, it stars Keeley Hawes as Louisa Durrell and Milo Parker as Gerald Durrell. Three subsequent series of The Durrells were broadcast, in 2017, 2018, and 2019. The first series is set in 1935, the second in 1936, the third in 1937, and the fourth in 1938–39.

=== Theatre ===
In 2006, the Jersey Arts Centre's Theatre in Education company produced the first stage version, in celebration of the 50th anniversary of the book's publication in 1956. Adapted and directed by Daniel Austin, the play premiered on 22 February 2007 at Rouge Bouillon School in St Helier.

== Similar titles ==
Several books have alluded to the title of Durrell's book, including Josephine Feeney's 1995 novel My Family and Other Natural Disasters, Simon Doonan's 2005 memoir Nasty: My Family and Other Glamorous Varmints, Kirin Narayan's 2007 memoir My Family and Other Saints, and Clare Balding's 2014 autobiography, My Animals and Other Family.

In Nanny Ogg's Cookbook by Terry Pratchett, there is reference to a fictional book titled My Family and Other Werewolves.

Martin Clunes hosted a British reality TV show on ITV called My Travels and Other Animals.

Guy Pratt, musician, has written a memoir called My Bass And Other Animals.
