= Elizabeth Ryan (disambiguation) =

Elizabeth Ryan (1892–1979) was an American tennis player.

Elizabeth Ryan may also refer to:

- Betty Ryan, American game developer and programmer
- Elizabeth Ryan (field hockey) (born 1985), field hockey striker from New Zealand
- Elizabeth Ryan (swimmer) (1923–1998), American freestyle swimmer
- Gig Ryan (born 1956), Australian poet
- Betty Ryan (artist) (1914-2003), American artist
