= Louisa Durrell =

British woman

- Born: Louisa Florence Dixie; 16 January 1886; Roorkee, British India
- Died: 24 January 1964 (aged 78); Bournemouth, England
- Spouse: Lawrence Samuel Durrell (m. 1910; died 1928)
- Children: Lawrence, Margaret, Leslie, Gerald
- Family: Dixie, Durrell

Louisa Florence Durrell (née Dixie; 16 January 1886 – 24 January 1964), was a British woman born in India during the British Raj. She was the mother of Lawrence, Leslie, Margo and Gerry Durrell. She was featured in Gerald Durrell's autobiographical Corfu trilogy, which tells about the Durrells' years in Corfu from 1935 to 1939 in a somewhat fictionalized way.

== Biography ==
Louisa Florence Dixie was born in 1886 to an Anglo-Irish Protestant family in Roorkee, India, where her family were colonials in the years of the British Raj. Her father, George Dixie, was the head clerk and accountant of the Ganges Canal Foundry.

In India, she met and married Lawrence Samuel Durrell, an English engineer also born in India. Together, they travelled all over India for Lawrence's engineering work.

They had three sons and two daughters, one of whom died in infancy. Their second child, Margery Ruth, was born in November 1915 and died from diphtheria in April 1916. The surviving children were Lawrence (Larry), Leslie, Margaret (Margo), and Gerald (Gerry). Louisa was described as an anxious mother, shunning social contact just to be with her children during their formative years.

Louisa was actively interested in spiritualism and cookery. She was unusual for mingling with Indians, more than many colonials, to learn of local spirits and cuisine. She did not conform to the views of her time regarding the segregation of social groups.

Her husband died of a brain tumour in 1928 in Dalhousie, India when she was 42, and Louisa decided to move her family to England. She left India with her family under dire circumstances. They settled in Bournemouth in 1932. She bought a house in the area and named it Dixie Lodge.

She moved again in 1935 with her eldest son, Lawrence, and his new wife, Nancy, to the island of Corfu, taking her other children with her. Her youngest son, Gerald, wrote memoirs about this formative period of his childhood on Corfu, where flora and fauna abounded. He portrayed his mother as the family's well-meaning but slightly eccentric matriarch in what is known as the Corfu trilogy: My Family and Other Animals (1956), Birds, Beasts and Relatives (1969), and The Garden of the Gods (1978).

In June 1939, before the outbreak of the Second World War, Louisa returned to England. After the war, she lived for periods with her daughter Margaret, who had a boarding house in Bournemouth, as well as with Gerald at his home at the Jersey Zoo, founded with the proceeds from his books.

Louisa died in Bournemouth in 1964 at the age of 78.

== Representation in other media ==
Gerald Durrell's trilogy has been adapted several times for British TV and radio series. Louisa was portrayed by Hannah Gordon in the 1987 BBC TV series My Family and Other Animals, by Imelda Staunton in the 2005 BBC adaptation, by Celia Imrie in the 2010 two-part BBC Radio drama, and by Keeley Hawes in the 2016–2019 ITV drama The Durrells.
