= Graham Percy =

New Zealand artist (1938–2008)

Graham Percy (7 June 1938 – 4 January 2008) was a New Zealand-born artist, designer and illustrator. His work was the subject of The Imaginative Life and Times of Graham Percy, a major posthumous exhibition of his work which was shown at galleries throughout New Zealand including City Gallery Wellington, Gus Fisher Gallery Auckland, Sarjeant Gallery Whanganui, the Rotorua Museum and the Southland Museum and Art Gallery, Invercargill.

== Life ==
Graham Percy was an artist, designer and illustrator. He was born in Stratford, New Zealand and studied at Elam School of Fine Arts in Auckland. After graduating in the early 1960s, Percy worked as an illustrator for the New Zealand School Journal and collaborated with other Auckland-based writers and artists. He designed the typography for a number of Colin McCahon's exhibition invitations and set up one of New Zealand's first design consultancies with Hamish Keith. During this period he designed covers for The End of the Golden Weather and The Pohutukawa Tree by Bruce Mason. In 1964, Percy received a scholarship to study at the Royal College of Art in London. From late 1964 until the end of his life, he lived and worked in London as an illustrator and artist. He was the production designer on the 1973 animated film Hugo the Hippo. While working on the film he met his second wife, the photographer Mari Mahr.

For much of his career, Percy specialised in children's books, illustrating more than 100 works for children. In later years, he produced a body of his own independent art for adults. In 1994, Chronicle Books (San Francisco) published a book of his drawings for adults, Arthouse. In 2007, a further series of his drawings for adults, 'Imagined Histories' was published, supported by the Scottish Arts Council. Graham Percy died on 4 January 2008.

== Notable works published during his lifetime ==
Books illustrated by Percy for children include the following:

- Illustrations for La Belle au bois dormant (1977) written by Charles Perrault
- Illustrations for When Dad cuts down the chestnut tree (1988) by Pam Ayres
- Illustrations for The Fantastic Flying Journey (1987) and The Fantastic Dinosaur Adventure (1989) by the noted author and naturalist Gerald Durrell
- Illustrations for The Woodland Gospels According to Captain Beaky and His Band, by Jeremy Lloyd, Faber and Faber (1990)
- Illustrations for A cup of starshine (1991) selected by Jill Bennett
- Illustrations and text for The Cock, the mouse, and the little red hen (1992)
- Illustrations and text for Lullabies: Poems and Rhymes to Dream on, Running Press (1995) – part of the Library of Congress Miniature Book Collection
- Design and illustration for the series Graham Percy's Animal Tails, Random House (1995)
- Illustrations for the illustrated Mother Goose, Running Press (1997)
- Illustrations for The Wind in the Willows, HarperCollins (1997)
- Illustrations for The mailbox mice mystery (1999) by Juli Mahr
- Illustrations for Mama tiger, Baba Tiger (2001) by Juli Mahr

Animated film for children:

- Production designer of the full-length animated film Hugo the Hippo in Hungary (1970–1972)

Books for adults:

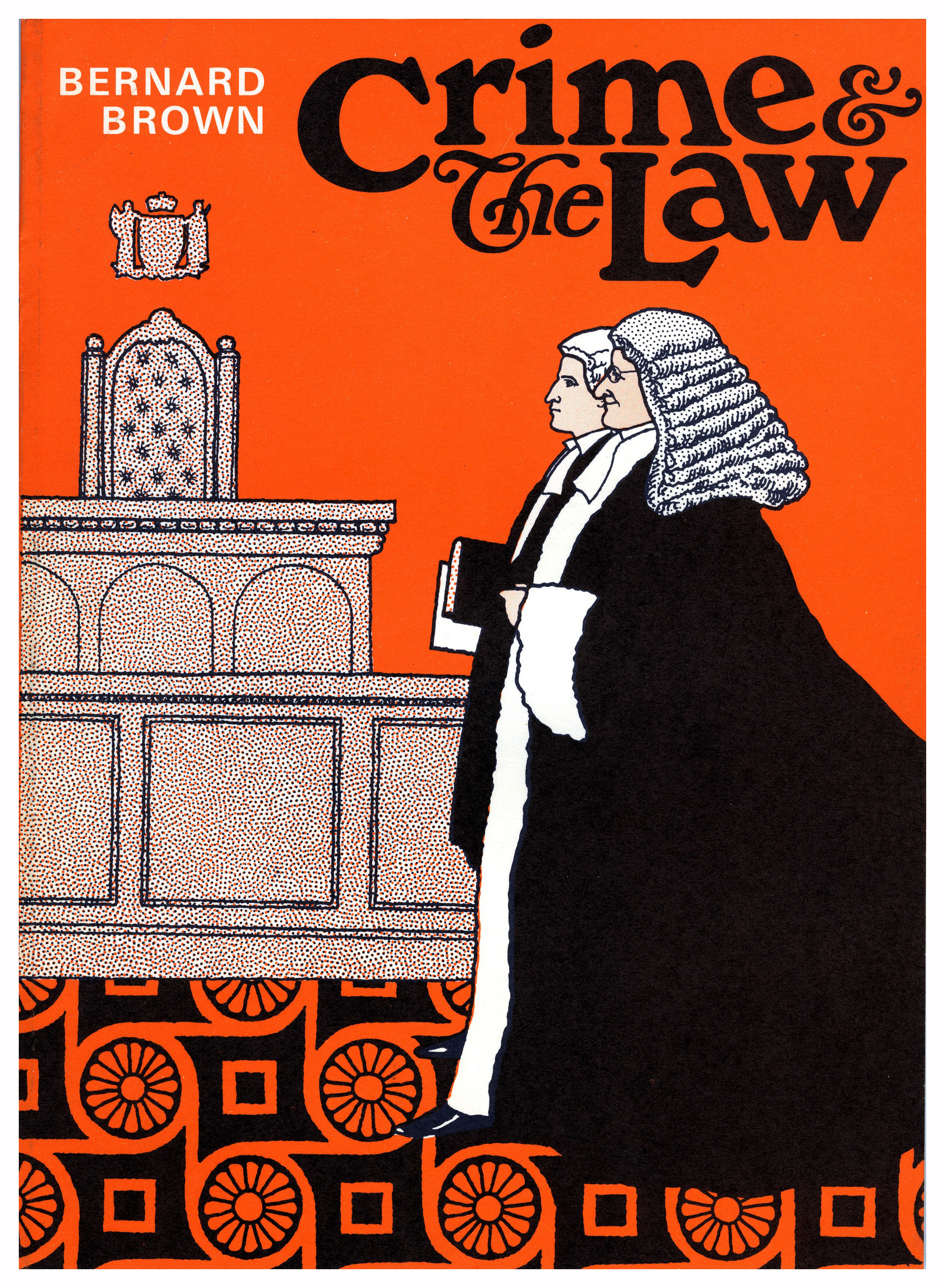
Crime and the Law was a Bulletin for schools, written by Bernard Brown and produced by the Department of Education (1969). It was illustrated by Graham Percy

- Illustrations for Crime and the law (1969) by Bernard Brown
- Concept and illustrations for Arthouse (1996), published by Chronicle Books, reviewed in the New York Times, artwork exhibited at Storyopolis gallery in Los Angeles.
- Concept and illustrations for Imagined Histories (2007), published by Crear, space to create, supported by the Scottish Arts Council.

== Posthumous exhibition and book ==
The Imaginative Life and Times of Graham Percy was a major posthumous exhibition of Percy's work. It was developed in partnership between City Gallery Wellington and Gus Fisher Gallery, The University of Auckland; it was curated by Gregory O'Brien, leading New Zealand poet, art critic and curator and winner of the 2012 Prime Minister's Awards for Literary Achievement.

A Micronaut in the Wide World: The Imaginative Life and Times of Graham Percy is an account of Graham Percy's life and art by O'Brien. It was a finalist in the New Zealand Post Book Awards 2012 and was highly commended in the Random House New Zealand Award for Best Illustrated Book 2012. A copy of the book was donated by the Chartwell Trust to every high school in New Zealand.

As of October 2013, the itinerary of the exhibition was as follows:

- 4 February – 25 April 2011: City Gallery Wellington, Wellington, New Zealand
- 6 May 2011 – 25 June 2011: Gus Fisher Gallery, Auckland, New Zealand
- 22 July – 28 August 2011: Millennium Art Gallery, Blenheim, New Zealand
- 10 September – 13 November 2011: Tauranga Art Gallery, Tauranga, New Zealand
- 19 November 2011 – 29 January 2012: Sarjeant Gallery, Whanganui, New Zealand
- 17 February – 22 March 2012: Percy Thomson Gallery, Stratford, New Zealand
- 5 May – 16 July 2012: Rotorua Museum, Rotorua, New Zealand
- 28 July – 23 September 2012: Hastings City Art Gallery, Hastings, New Zealand
- 23 November 2012 – 3 February 2013: Southland Museum and Art Gallery, Invercargill, New Zealand
- 17 April – 9 June 2013: Eastern Southland Gallery, Gore, New Zealand
- 15 June – 10 August 2013: Hocken Collections (Uare Taoka o Hākena), Dunedin, New Zealand
- 17 August – 13 October 2013: The Forrester Gallery, Oamaru
- 19 October 2013 – 26 January 2014: Nelson Provincial Museum, Nelson, New Zealand
- 24 February – 20 April 2014: Whangārei Art Museum, Whangārei
- 26 April – 15 June 2014: Puke Ariki, New Plymouth
- 21 June – 10 August 2014: Aratoi, Masterton
- 16 August – 23 November 2014: Waikato Museum, Hamilton
