= ITV Panto =

British TV series

- Genre: Pantomime; Comedy
- Written by: Simon Nye
- Starring: Various
- Country of origin: United Kingdom
- Original language: English
- No. of episodes: 4

Production
- Running time: 90 minutes
- Production companies: Wishbone Production; LWT (ITV Studios); Pozzitive Television

Original release
- Network: ITV
- Release: 25 December 1998 – 1 January 2002

The ITV Panto was a series of televised pantomimes originally broadcast on ITV in 1998, 2000, and 2002. They have since been repeated over the 20 years since they were filmed. All were written by Simon Nye, and they included an array of celebrities playing the lead roles.

== Pantomimes ==
(In order of original broadcast date)

- Jack and the Beanstalk (original broadcast: 25 December 1998) - filmed at the Old Vic Theatre.
- Cinderella (original broadcast: 2 January 2000) - filmed at the Brixton Academy.
- Aladdin (original broadcast: 25 December 2000) - filmed at the New Wimbledon Theatre.
- Dick Whittington (original broadcast: 1 January 2002) - filmed at the New Wimbledon Theatre.

== Recurring cast members ==
All the main roles in each pantomime were played by well-known celebrities, some of whom became regular players, some major celebrities also made cameo appearances. Paul Merton and Julian Clary are the only people to appear in all four, while Harry Hill and Griff Rhys Jones have appeared in two shows.

== Cast ==
Character	Actor
Jack and the Beanstalk
Jack	Neil Morrissey
Dame Dolly	Adrian Edmondson
Baron Wasteland	Griff Rhys Jones
Jill	Denise van Outen
Goldilocks	Morwenna Banks
Fairy Godmother	Julie Walters
First Henchman/Tim	Julian Clary
Second Henchman	Peter Serafinowicz
Harp	Will Barton
Cow	Vince Williams
Cow	John Willett
Narrator	Paul Merton
Cinderella
Cinderella	Samantha Womack
Buttons	Frank Skinner
Evil Baroness	Siân Phillips
Griselda	Ronnie Corbett
Lucretia	Paul Merton
Dandini	Ben Miller
The Good Fairy	Julian Clary
Prince Charming	Alexander Armstrong
Master of Ceremonies	Harry Hill
Aladdin
Aladdin	Ed Byrne
Genie of the Lamp	Julian Clary
Abanazer	Martin Clunes
Princess Jasmine	Patsy Kensit
Wishee Washee	Ralf Little
Spirit of the Ring	Paul Merton
Widow Twankey	John Savident
Police chief	Billy Murray
Prince Hugely Suave	Leslie Phillips
Emperor	Griff Rhys Jones
Handy	Lisa Riley
Themselves	S Club 7
High Priestess	Meera Syal
Themself (Cameo - uncredited)	Trisha Goddard
Dick Whittington
Dick Whittington	Kevin Bishop
Queen of Tonga	Amanda Barrie
Chris the Cat	Julian Clary
Mrs Fitzwarren	Vanessa Feltz
Alderman Fitzwarren	James Fleet
Themselves	Hear'Say
The Painter	Harry Hill
The Good Fairy	Jessica Hynes
Idle Jack	Lee Mack
Tricky Pete	Paul Merton
The Mayor	Sanjeev Bhaskar
Maid of Tonga	Tina O'Brien
Alice Fitzwarren	Debra Stephenson
King Rat	Mark Williams
Sally the Cook	Richard Wilson
