= The Mockery Bird =

1981 novel by Gerald Durrell

- First edition Cover art by Hanife Hassan
- Author: Gerald Durrell
- Language: English
- Publisher: William Collins, Sons and Co Ltd
- Publication date: 1981

The Mockery Bird is a humorous novel by Gerald Durrell, published in 1981 by William Collins, Sons and Co Ltd. The book, like the other works of the author, contains a strong environmental message.

== Plot summary ==
The story takes place on a (fictitious) tropical island called Zenkali. The island seems to be populated by the most eccentric people who came there from all around the world, along with the two indigenous tribes, the Fangoua and the Ginka. The Ginkas used to worship a dolphin god, while the Fangouas worshipped a strange avian, the Mockery Bird, which was hunted to extinction by the former French colonizers. Zenkali is ruled by King Tamalawala III, usually referred to as "Kingy" by his people.

Peter Foxglove arrives in Zenkali to be the assistant of Hannibal Oliphant, Kingy's Political Advisor. Zenkali, once a British colony, is about to get self-government. They are also planning to construct a military base, an airport, and a power station, and this will mean the flooding of a large, unexplored valley owned by the villainous businessman, Looja. Peter, along with the beautiful Audrey Damien, visits the valley before it is totally destroyed and makes a fantastic discovery: a small population of Mockery Birds still lives in the valley.

Peter's discovery attracts the attention of the world press, environmentalists, politicians, and businessmen from all around the world, and this leads to a couple of adventures. Finally, Professor Droom, a biologist, discovers that the main and only agricultural product of Zenkali, the Amela tree, is ecologically linked to the Mockery Birds (explained below), so the flooding of the valley will make the island's economy collapse. Consequently, the construction of the airport is cancelled.

== The bird ==
The fictitious bird species of the book, the Mockery Bird is a flightless bird about the size of a goose. It has blue feathers, long legs and a large beak, similar to that of a hornbill. As an example of sexual dimorphism, the male Mockery Birds have a large hump on their beak, while the females have only a small, bony shield. The bird was named after its call, that sounds like laughter (much like the kookaburra's).

The Mockery Bird was worshipped by the native Fangoua people, but was believed to be hunt to extinction. Mysteriously, when the bird was lost, a tree species, the Ombu tree also disappeared. This shows that there was a strong ecological link (symbiosis) between the two species. It means ecological conditions which are congenial for one species are good for the other.

In the book, Professor Droom discovers the nature of this relationship: the bird feeds on the fruit of the tree, and spreads its seeds. Also, the caterpillars of a large species of moth feed on the leaves of the Ombu tree, and this very same moth species pollinates the Amela trees, the main product of Zenkali. So all species on the island, including humans, are linked in an ecological chain.

== Allusions ==
- Though the story of the Mockery Bird is fictitious, there was another bird species thought to be extinct, and then re-discovered: the takahe from New Zealand.
- Several characters of the book show strong resemblance to real people, introduced in Durrell's autobiographical books: Kingy is similar to the Fon of Bafut, while Pappas, the Greek captain is more or less based on Spiro, the driver in My Family and Other Animals.
