= The Garden of the Gods =

Autobiographical book by naturalist and author, Gerald Durrell

- First edition
- Author: Gerald Durrell
- Language: English
- Series: Gerald Durrell's Corfu trilogy
- Subject: Gerald Durrell's life in Corfu as a boy
- Genre: Autobiography
- Publisher: Collins
- Publication date: 1978
- Publication place: United Kingdom
- Pages: 192
- ISBN: 978-0-00-635859-6
- OCLC: 421557101
- Preceded by: My Family and Other Animals, Birds, Beasts and Relatives

The Garden of the Gods (American title: Fauna and Family) is a 1978 autobiographical book by British naturalist and author Gerald Durrell (1925–1995). It is the third book in his autobiographical Corfu trilogy, following My Family and Other Animals and Birds, Beasts, and Relatives.

== Summary ==
This book is a humorous description of events that took place on the Greek island of Corfu between the years 1935 and 1939. The youngest in his family, Gerald was ten years of age when his widowed mother, Louisa Florence Durrell, moved the remaining family: son Leslie Durrell, and daughter, Margaret Durrell (referred to in the book as "Margo"), from Bournemouth to join her eldest son Lawrence Durrell and his wife Nancy on the island.

The author describes his many exploits catching, and making pets of, the local fauna, and the subsequent effects on his family. They are featured as major characters, although he does not discuss Lawrence's wife Nancy. Other characters from the previous books also appear here, such as Spiro (their Greek friend and chauffeur), Theodore Stephanides (family friend, doctor, poet and naturalist), and Mr Kralefsky (Gerald's one-time tutor in Corfu). He describes the new and colourful characters of Lumis Bean, Harry Bunny, Prince Jeejeebuoy, and Count Rossignol (all fictional).

The Garden of the Gods was first published in 1978 by William Collins Sons & Co. Ltd, and simultaneously in the United States as Fauna and Family by Simon and Schuster (ISBN 0-671-24729-8).
