= The Colossus of Maroussi =

1941 novel by Henry Miller

- First edition
- Author: Henry Miller
- Language: English
- Genre: Autobiographical novel, travelogue
- Publisher: Colt Press
- Publication date: 1941
- Publication place: United States
- ISBN: 978-0-8112-1857-3

The Colossus of Maroussi is an impressionist travelogue by American writer Henry Miller that was first published in 1941 by Colt Press of San Francisco. Set in pre-Second World War Greece of 1939, it is ostensibly an exploration of the "Colossus" of the title, George Katsimbalis, a poet and raconteur. The work is frequently heralded as Miller's best.

== Background ==
Henry Miller left Paris, his home of nine years, in 1939 as the Nazis began to take action in Europe and the outbreak of the Second World War loomed. In need of rejuvenation, he traveled to Greece at the invitation of his friend, British writer Lawrence Durrell, who lived in Corfu. Miller had already published what are considered some of his best-known works, including Tropic of Cancer, Black Spring, and Tropic of Capricorn.

Miller drew his Colossus from events that occurred and landscapes he encountered while living for nine months in Greece. His portrayal of poet Katsimbalis and the country is tempered by the outbreak of the Second World War, which forced him to leave for the United States in December 1939.

Miller largely wrote the book in New York City, and the work reflects his resentment at having to return to America, as well as his feeling of isolation there. Miller recalled, "the whole book came effortlessly, often with tears streaming down my face- tears of joy and tears of sorrow. Never in my life had I had such a marvellous vacation".

In the first lines of the Colossus, Miller credits Betty Ryan for inspiring his trip to Greece: "I would never have gone to Greece had it not been for a girl named Betty Ryan who lived in the same house with me in Paris." Ryan and Miller met while living at 18 Villa Seurat in Paris in the late 1930s, and maintained a lifelong friendship.

== Content ==
The light of Greece opened my eyes, penetrated my pores, expanded my whole being.

— Henry Miller

Miller travels in Athens, Crete, Corfu, Poros, Hydra and Delphi. As he describes these places, he also portrays Greek writer George Katsimbalis (the "Colossus" of the book's title). Among other characters are Lawrence Durrell, his first wife Nancy, and Theodore Stephanides. Some critics argue that the Colossus is more of a self-portrait of Miller himself. The influence of D. H. Lawrence and Ernest Hemingway have been noted.

== Critical reception ==
Critics consider this to be Miller's best, a view which the author also held. Pico Iyer describes the novel as an "ecstatic ramble". Will Self depicts Miller in the novel as "a relentless fabulist who advances solipsism to the status of one of the fine arts."
