= The Savages (TV series) =

British sitcom

- Victoria Hamilton as Jessica Savage and Steven Brand as Richard
- Genre: Sitcom
- Starring: Geoffrey Palmer; Marcus Brigstocke; Victoria Hamilton
- Country of origin: United Kingdom
- Original language: English
- No. of seasons: 1
- No. of episodes: 6

Production
- Running time: 30 minutes
- Production company: Hartswood Films

Original release
- Network: BBC One
- Release: 24 April – 29 May 2001

The Savages is a British sitcom that aired on BBC One in 2001. Starring Geoffrey Palmer and comedian Marcus Brigstocke, it was written by Simon Nye, the writer of Men Behaving Badly.

The Savages revolves around the Savage family, with Geoffrey Palmer playing grandfather Donald, Marcus Brigstocke his son Adam and Victoria Hamilton as Adam's wife Jessica. The programme aired for only one series. The song "Days" by the Kinks was used as its theme song

== Cast ==
- Marcus Brigstocke – Adam Savage
- Victoria Hamilton – Jessica Savage
- Geoffrey Palmer – Donald Savage
- Liberty Morris – Nicola Savage
- Jake Fitzgerald – Luke Savage
- Gresby Nash – Mark Savage

== Plot ==
Adam, a successful cartoonist with a strip in a national newspaper, and Jessica Savage, who works at a travel agents, are a modern young couple. They work too hard, they argue occasionally, they bicker a lot, and they are stressed out, but their relationship is kept together by affection. Their hyperactive young children, six-year-old Nicola and three-year-old Luke, are both destructive. Adam's retired and vague father, Donald, lives nearby on his own, after his wife walked out on him. Adam also has a brother called Mark.

== Episodes ==
Each episode aired on BBC One on Tuesdays and is thirty minutes long. The first few episodes aired at 9.00pm, the later ones at 9.30pm.

No.	Title	Original release date
1	"The Au Pair"	24 April 2001
Adam and Jessica are exhausted, so they ask Donald to look after the children, but after taking them to the zoo he is a twitching wreck, so Adam and Jessica interview for au pairs instead. Meanwhile, Adam befriends a mouse and gives it cheese.
2	"Books"	1 May 2001
Adam forms a book club in an attempt to impress and outdo Jessica, who also has a book club. But while he says his club will read longer books, he, Donald, Mark and friend John soon have problems. Meanwhile, Luke keeps wetting the bed.
3	"Learning to Cook"	8 May 2001
Mark is thinking of settling down, and wants to show his new girlfriend how good family life can be. Meanwhile, Donald takes up the suggestion that he learn to cook and Jessica does some clothes shopping for Adam.
4	"Scary Drawings"	15 May 2001
Adam is becoming lonely and unproductive working at home, so he decides to go to a workplace and draw there. Meanwhile, Nicola is drawing violent cartoons.
5	"Finding Dad a Girlfriend"	22 May 2001
Adam wants a third child, but Jessica is uncertain so she agrees to try for one night only and let nature decide. Meanwhile, Adam helps Donald find a woman.
6	"The Ex-Files"	29 May 2001
When an old boyfriend called Richard (Steven Brand), who is newly divorced, comes into the travel agency, Jessica agrees to meet up with him, but does not intend on telling Adam. When he finds out he finds himself thinking of his former girlfriend Barbara. Meanwhile, Adam is looking after some bouncy bricks for Luke's nursery fête.

== Broadcast worldwide ==
In 2008, The Savages was broadcast on various PBS stations across the United States as part of the "One Season Wonders" strand.
