= Lawrence Samuel Durrell =

British Indian subject and engineer (1884–1928)

- Born: 23 September 1884; Dum Dum, Calcutta, British India
- Died: 16 April 1928 (aged 43); Dalhousie, British India
- Education: Thomason College of Civil Engineering
- Occupation: Engineer
- Spouse: Louisa Dixie (m. 1910)
- Children: Lawrence, Margaret, Leslie, Gerald
- Family: Durrell

Lawrence Samuel Durrell (23 September 1884 – 16 April 1928) was a British engineer. He was the father of novelist Lawrence Durrell and naturalist and writer Gerald Durrell.

== Early life ==
Durrell was born in Dum Dum, north of Calcutta (present day Kolkata) on 23 September 1884, the son of Samuel Amos Durrell and his wife, Dora Maria Johnstone, and christened in Fatehgarh, Bengal, on 7 October 1884.

== Career ==
An engineer by profession, he studied in the Thomason College of Civil Engineering (now the Indian Institute of Technology, Roorkee). While he worked for the North-West Railway in Jalandhar, his son Lawrence was born in 1912. Durrell went on to work for the Mymensingh–Bhairab Bazar Railway Company in Bengal.

In 1918, he became the chief engineer of the Darjeeling Himalayan Railway, and in 1920 left the company to found his own company Durrell & Co., Engineers and Contractors at Sakci, which became the industrial boomtown of Jamshedpur. Gerald Durrell was born in Jamshedpur in 1925. Many of the important industrial constructions in Jamshedpur were undertaken by his company, including the Tinplate Company of India, the Indian Cable Company, and the Enamelled Ironware Company, and contractual work for the Tata Iron and Steel Works.

Although Durrell purchased a house in Dulwich and was planning on moving to England, he transferred instead to Lahore with his family for supervising contract work. In 1928, he fell ill due to causes which were medically undiagnosed and attributed to overwork. The family moved to Dalhousie for the climate in 1928, but Durrell died on 16 April 1928 of suspected cerebral haemorrhage and is buried in the British cemetery at Dalhousie.

Like many British whose families had been resident in India for generations, Durrell worked and socialised with Indians of all professions and castes. On one occasion, according to a story told by Lawrence Durrell, his novelist son, Durrell gave up his membership at a club when his proposal to include an Oxford-educated Indian doctor who had saved his son's life was turned down.

== Personal life and family ==
In Roorkee, he met Louisa Florence Dixie and married her in 1910. The couple had three sons and two daughters: Lawrence (1912), Margery (1915), Leslie (1917), Margaret (1919), and Gerald (1925).

== Works cited ==
- Through the Dark Labyrinth: Biography of Lawrence Durrell, Gordon Bowker, Sinclair Stevenson, 1996
- Gerald Durrell: The Authorized Biography, Douglas Botting, Carroll & Graf, 1999
- Alexandria: City of Memory, Michael Haag, Yale University Press, London and New Haven, 2004, which contains biographical material on the writer Lawrence Durrell and his family.
