= Betty Ryan (artist) =

American woman artist

Elizabeth Bartlett Ryan Gordon (August 19, 1914 – January 9, 2003) was an American artist who spent part of her life in France and Greece. She often went by the name Betty Ryan. Her artistic vision was influenced by Hans Hoffman, with whom she studied, and she experimented with light and color in watercolors and oil paintings throughout her life. Other influences included Rembrandt, Goya, Picasso, and Rimbaud. In addition to her artistry, she spoke and taught multiple languages, translated texts, and co-authored a Russian language textbook.

As a young woman living in Paris in the 1930s at the Villa Seurat, she met Henry Miller, with whom she maintained a lifelong friendship. The first lines of Miller's The Colossus of Marussi reference her: "I would never have gone to Greece had it not been for a girl named Betty Ryan who lived in the same house with me in Paris."

== Early life and Europe ==
Ryan was born in New York City to John N. Ryan and Alice Bartlett, from a well to-do family, her father was a businessman involved with the Equitable Life Assurance Society and her mother is described as a socialite. From Ryan´s father´s previous marriage she had a half-brother Payson Hancock Ryan who was foreign correspondent at The French Press Bureau. The family lived at 102 West Eightieth Street on the Upper West Side.

In her youth she and her family undertook travels in Europe.

== Education ==
Ryan attended Rosemary Hall and Spence School. At age 12, she was admitted to the Art Students League, and at 16, she began studying with Hans Hoffman. Upon finishing high school in 1932, Ryan decided to travel and study in Europe, rather than go directly to college.

From 1932 to 1939, she spent time in Spain, France, Greece, Germany, Yugoslavia, and Italy. Throughout these travels, she studied language, literature, history, history of art and drawing at universities and with private tutors. Among the artists she studied under were Amédée Ozenfant. At this time Ryan was described as an "abstract" painter.

In 1935, she rented an apartment at Villa Seurat, a street of artists, in Paris' 14th arrondissement. While there, she befriended her upstairs neighbor Henry Miller and his circle of friends, which included Anais Nin, Hans Reichel, and Lawrence Durrell. She and Miller helped organize an exhibition of Reichel's works in her apartment; the exhibition was attended by Kandinsky, Miro, Duchamp and Max Ernst.

== Return to the United States ==
Ryan returned to the United States in 1939 as World War II was beginning, and married Harry Wight Gordon in August 1940. Harry joined the Navy in 1941, and Betty spent time in Cambridge, Massachusetts, studying Russian language and history at Radcliffe College and Harvard Summer School, and in private lessons with Vera Nabokov. From 1942-1945, she worked for the Soviet Government Purchasing Commission in San Francisco, having relocated there with her husband. At some point, she again studied with Hans Hoffman, in New York City or in Provincetown, Massachusetts. She is listed as one of his students during the 1933-1945 period.

From 1946-1950, she taught French, German and Russian at the University of Maine, where her husband worked as Treasurer. After 13 years of marriage they divorced. She earned her B.A. from the New School in 1958, in sociology and literature, and an M.A. in Slavic Languages and Literature from Radcliffe College in 1959. She also spent time on Cape Cod, and was friends with a circle of creative people that included architect Serge Chermayev and writer Arturo Vivante.

== Greece and later life ==
In the 1960s, Ryan moved to Greece. In the 1970s, she settled on the island of Andros, where she lived for over 20 years. She appreciated the solitude and quiet of Andros, and devoted time to painting. From her first visit to Greece in the 1930s, she considered the light there magical, and tried to capture it in her artwork.

Before moving back to the United States in 1998, she donated her papers and some collected artwork to the Kairios Library, where a room was named after her. After several return trips to Greece and France, she eventually settled in Woodstock, Vermont, where she died in 2003.

== Legacy ==
Ryan's essays about her life at the Villa Seurat in the 1930s were published by Pleasant Street Books Publishing Co. in Woodstock, Vermont, in 2013. Her translation of a Juan Gris lecture was published in 2015. An exhibition of her work, titled "Betty Ryan", was held at the Museum of Contemporary Art Andros in 2014.
