= Margaret Durrell =

British memoirist (1919-2007)

Margo Durrell
- Born: Margaret Isabel Mabel Durrell; 4 May 1919; Kurseong, Bengal, British India
- Died: 16 January 2007 (aged 87); Bournemouth, Dorset, England
- Notable work: Whatever Happened to Margo?
- Spouses: Jack Breeze (m. 1940, divorced) Malcolm "Mac" Duncan (divorced)
- Children: 2
- Parents: Lawrence Samuel Durrell; Louisa Durrell
- Relatives: Lawrence Durrell (brother); Gerald Durrell (brother); Leslie Durrell (brother)
- Family: Durrell

Margaret Isabel Mabel "Margo" Durrell (4 May 1919 – 16 January 2007) was the younger sister of novelist Lawrence Durrell and elder sister of naturalist, author, and TV presenter Gerald Durrell, who lampoons her character in his Corfu trilogy of novels: My Family and Other Animals, Birds, Beasts, and Relatives, and The Garden of the Gods.

She wrote a memoir, Whatever Happened to Margo?, giving a humorous account of her experiences as a Bournemouth landlady in the late 1940s. It includes details about the lives of her family, particularly Leslie, Gerald, and her mother Louisa Durrell following their time on Corfu. The manuscript was apparently written in the 1960s and was discovered in the attic by a granddaughter nearly 35 years later. It was published in 1995.

== Early life ==
Durrell was born in Kurseong, Bengal, in British India and brought up in India and England. In 1935, along with her brothers Gerald and Leslie, she accompanied her mother to a new home on Corfu, following her eldest brother, Lawrence, who had moved there a few months earlier with his first wife, Nancy Myers. Margo's mother, with Gerald and Leslie, returned to England by 1939 with the outbreak of World War II, but Margo decided that her real home was on Corfu and remained on the island, sharing a peasant cottage with some local friends.

== Marriages and wartime ==
Durrell met Jack Breeze, the chief flight engineer of an Imperial Airways flying boat, later the same year. At the time, Imperial Airways used Corfu as a waypoint between Africa and England. He convinced her of the dangers of staying on Corfu, so, after Christmas, she left on one of the last Imperial Airways flights to leave the island to rejoin her family in Bournemouth.

She married Breeze in early 1940, and they moved to South Africa when the airline posted him there later in the year. During the war years, they eventually moved to Mozambique and then Ethiopia, where she gave birth to their first child, Gerry, in an Italian prisoner-of-war camp by Caesarean section without anesthetic. They lived in Cairo towards the end of the war. After the war ended, they moved back to Bournemouth, where they had their second son, Nicholas.

== Boarding house and zoo ==
Durrell divorced her husband and, in 1947, purchased a large property across the street from her mother's house in Bournemouth, turning it into a boarding house. Gerald Durrell's core collection for his zoo was initially housed in the back garden and garage. Later, Margo had a short-lived marriage with musician Malcolm "Mac" Duncan. She was still enamoured with Greece, so she applied for a job on a Greek cruise ship travelling to the Caribbean that she saw advertised in a newspaper.

== Death ==
Margaret Durrell died at age 87 on 16 January 2007. Her ashes were scattered on Pontikonisi, an islet off Corfu, to which the Durrells used to swim as children; part of the ashes of her brother Gerald had also been scattered there following his death in 1995.

== Bibliography ==
- Whatever Happened to Margo? (1996, ISBN 0-233-98917-X)

== Portrayals ==
- In the BBC 10-part TV series My Family and Other Animals (1987), Margo was played by Sarah-Jane Holm.
- In the film My Family and Other Animals (2005), Margo was played by Tamzin Merchant.
- In the ITV 4-season TV series The Durrells (2016–2019), Margo was played by Daisy Waterstone.
