= Simon Nye =

British screenwriter (born 1958)

- Born: 29 July 1958 (age 68); Burgess Hill, Sussex, England
- Occupations: Writer, comedy
- Years active: 1989–present
- Partner: Claudia Stumpfl

Simon Nye (born 29 July 1958) is an English screenwriter, best known for television comedy. He wrote the hit sitcom Men Behaving Badly, and all of the four ITV Pantos. He co-wrote the 2006 film Flushed Away, created an adaptation of Richmal Crompton's Just William books in 2010, and wrote the drama series The Durrells.

== Early life ==
Nye was born in Burgess Hill, Sussex. Nye was educated at Collyer's School and Bedford College, University of London, where he studied French and German.

He started his writing career as a translator, publishing translations of books on Richard Wagner, Henri Matisse and Georges Braque, before turning his hand to novel writing in 1989, with Men Behaving Badly. This was followed in 1991 by Wideboy, which he later adapted into the TV show Frank Stubbs Promotes.

== Career ==
=== Men Behaving Badly ===
Nye's TV writing career began in 1990 when he was persuaded by producer Beryl Vertue to adapt his first novel for the small screen. The first two series of Men Behaving Badly were broadcast on ITV in 1992. The show soon went on to achieve critical and commercial success, winning the Writers' Guild of Great Britain Award for Best Situation Comedy in 1995, and the Royal Television Society Award for Best Situation Comedy/Comedy Drama in 1996. The show became the most-repeated comedy show in the 1990s.

Nye also appeared in the show, briefly playing a prospective tenant in the episode "Gary and Tony". He also played one of Gary's friends, Clive, in the episode where Gary and Dorothy plan to get married.

=== Other work ===
Though best known for sitcoms – such as Is It Legal? (starring Imelda Staunton), How Do You Want Me? (starring Charlotte Coleman and Dylan Moran), Hardware (starring Martin Freeman) and Carrie and Barry (a semi-sequel to Men Behaving Badly starring Neil Morrissey as a matured Tony in all but name) – he has also written comedy dramas such as Frank Stubbs Promotes (1993–1994), as well as literary adaptations such as The Railway Children (2000). In addition, he has written a number of comic adaptations of pantomimes including Jack and the Beanstalk (25 December 1998), Cinderella (2 January 2000), Aladdin (25 December 2000), and Dick Whittington (1 January 2002). He also wrote the short-lived 2001 sitcom The Savages, and contributed an episode to the 2010 series of Doctor Who, titled "Amy's Choice."

Nye also continues to write translations, focusing in recent years on dramatic works. His translation of Molière's Don Juan was first performed at the Crucible Theatre in Sheffield in 2001, and his translation of Dario Fo's Accidental Death of an Anarchist premiered at the Donmar Warehouse in London in 2003. He also wrote a pilot episode Felix and Murdo, which starred Alexander Armstrong and Ben Miller.

He wrote the screenplay for the 2005 BBC television film of My Family And Other Animals based on Gerald Durrell's Corfu Trilogy. In 2016, Nye wrote ITV's The Durrells, another adaptation of the trilogy, starring Keeley Hawes as Louisa Durrell.

Nye wrote a play, The Crown Jewels, about the theft of the Crown Jewels by Thomas Blood, which was performed at the Garrick Theatre in London in 2023. The part of Blood was played by Aidan McArdle, and the cast included Al Murray as King Charles II, Neil Morrissey and Mel Giedroyc.

== Filmography ==
Year	Title	Distributor
1992–1998	Men Behaving Badly	ITV/BBC One
1993–1994	Frank Stubbs Promotes	ITV
1995–1998	Is It Legal?	ITV/Channel 4
1996–1999	My Wonderful Life	ITV
1998–1999	How Do You Want Me?	BBC Two
1998–1999	The Last Salute	BBC One
2000	The Railway Children	ITV
2000–2001	Beast	BBC One
2001	The Savages	BBC One
2002–2004	Wild West	BBC One
2003–2004	Hardware	ITV
2004–2005	Carrie and Barry	BBC One
2005	My Family And Other Animals	BBC One
2009–2010	Reggie Perrin (with David Nobbs)	BBC One
2010	Doctor Who – "Amy's Choice"	BBC One
2010	Just William	CBBC
2014	Tommy Cooper: Not Like That, Like This	ITV
2016–2019	The Durrells	ITV
2018	The Sex Pistols Vs. Bill Grundy	Sky Arts
2021	Finding Alice	ITV
2021–2022	The Larkins	ITV

== Bibliography ==
=== Novels ===
- Wideboy (1991) ISBN 0-670-83254-5
- Men Behaving Badly (1989) ISBN 0-06-016069-1

=== Translations ===
- Accidental Death of an Anarchist (2003) ISBN 0-413-77342-6
- Matisse: The Graphic Work (1988) ISBN 0-8478-0932-3
- Georges Braque: Life and Work (1988) ISBN 0-8478-0986-2
- Vienna Opera (1987) ISBN 0-8478-0811-4
