= The Fantastic Flying Journey =

1987 novel by Gerald Durrell

- 1st edition cover
- Author: Gerald Durrell
- Illustrator: Graham Percy
- Language: English
- Genre: Children's literature, adventure fiction, science fiction
- Publisher: Simon & Schuster Books for Young Readers
- Publication date: 1987
- Publication place: United States
- Media type: Print
- Pages: 151
- ISBN: 0-671-64982-5
- OCLC: 16404596
- Followed by: The Fantastic Dinosaur Adventure

The Fantastic Flying Journey is a 1987 children's adventure novel by Gerald Durrell. It is a story about three children and their great-uncle Lancelot travelling around the world in a hot air balloon. It was illustrated by Graham Percy and published by Simon & Schuster Books for Young Readers. In 1989, Durrell published a sequel, The Fantastic Dinosaur Adventure.

== Plot summary ==
One day, a hot air balloon attached to a huge straw house, lands in the garden of the Dollybutt family. The fat old man who owns it is Great-Uncle Lancelot. He tells Mrs Dollybutt and her three children that he is going to find his brother, Perceval, who is lost in the jungles of Africa, looking for gorillas. Perceval, a scientist, invented a magic dust which enables people to communicate with animals.

Lancelot takes the three children, Emma, Ivan and Conrad with him in the hot air balloon, which he has called Belladonna, to track Uncle Perceval. On their way, they meet several animals which they can talk to (because of the dust), including a swallow, a camel and a fennec fox, who tell them many interesting facts about their lives. In the jungle, the gorillas tell them that Perceval left for South Africa, to meet some elephants.

Lancelot and the three children follow Perceval to South Africa, and then to Australia, the North Pole, Canada, North America, Brazil and Patagonia. On their way, they meet a crocodile, a rhinoceros, some koalas, a platypus, a blue whale, some killer whales, polar bears, musk oxen, beavers, buffalos, monarch butterflies, a boa constrictor, some howler monkeys, penguins and elephant seals. Everywhere, they learn something about the animals, their habitat, behaviour and dangers threatening them.

In the end, the elephant seal tells them that Uncle Perceval has returned to Britain. So they follow him there, and find Perceval in the Dollybutts' house. The chase lasted a whole year, but the children all agree it was not a waste of time at all.

== Background ==
Durrell based the character of Great-Uncle Lancelot on himself. His brother Perceval was loosely based on his brother Lawrence.

The personality of the animals in the book usually reflects Durrell's opinion about those species. For example, the gorillas have a lovable personality because Durrell was on good terms with his gorillas at the Jersey Zoo. On the contrary, the camel is rude and nasty because when Durrell worked at Whipsnade Zoo, he was bitten by a camel.

== TV series adaptation ==
In 2001, a 2D-animated children's television show was produced by Two Sides TV and German animation production/distribution firm TV-Loonland AG based on the book. In addition to the original plot, a villain called Lucretia Moore follows Lancelot and the children in their air balloon, and tries to sabotage their attempts to find Perceval, so she can steal the magic dust. She wants it for her own benefits as the head of the world's largest pet food company. Lucretia follows the balloon with her spineless subordinate assistant in a modern helicopter. In each episode, Lucretia manages to hinder the groups travels but they always get away in the knick of time.

The television series was broadcast in the UK and Australia.
