= The Fantastic Dinosaur Adventure =

1989 novel by Gerald Durrell

First edition

The Fantastic Dinosaur Adventure (ISBN 1850292892) is the sequel to The Fantastic Flying Journey, both written by Gerald Durrell, illustrated by Graham Percy and published by Conran Octopus, this one in 1989. In this story, the Dollybutt children and their great-uncle Lancelot travel to the Mesozoic era to save dinosaurs from poachers.
