= George Katsimbalis =

Greek writer

- Born: 1899; Athens
- Died: 25 July 1978; Athens
- Occupations: Writer, translator

Signature
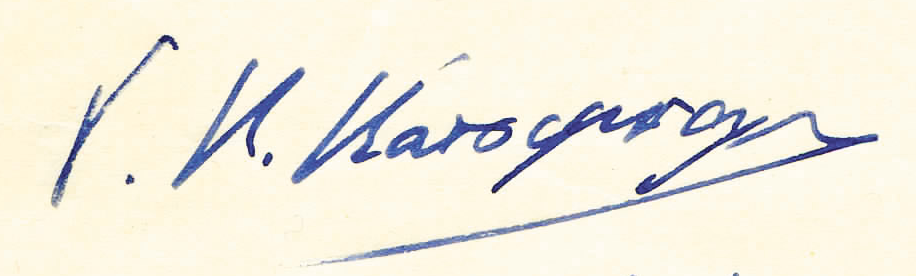

George Katsimbalis (Greek: Γιώργος Κατσίμπαλης Giorgos Katsimbalis; 1899 – July 25, 1978) was a Greek intellectual, editor and writer, and member of the Generation of the '30s. He was known as "The Colossus of Maroussi" owing to Henry Miller's work of the same title.

== Biography ==
George Katsimbalis was born in Athens in 1899. His father, Constantine Katsimbalis, was a professor who studied in Paris. His mother was a Greek woman from the Gousios family of Romania. The Katsimbalis family originated in Katsibali. Katsimbalis had a sister, Soso, who committed suicide as a young adult.

Katsimbalis's parents and two children moved from Greece to Paris in 1916. That same year, George Katsimbalis left the family to fight for Greece in World War I. He left by ship from Marseilles to Greece, but the ship was torpedoed by a German Navy submarine, Surviving the attack, Katsimbalis ended up in Egypt. He eventually reached Thessaloniki, then served as a second lieutenant in the Greek Army on the Macedonian front.

At the end of World War I, Katsimbalis returned to France. He attended courses at the Sorbonne University Law School, but left to fight for Greece in the Greco-Turkish War, with the Greek Army. In 1924, the entire Katsimbalis family returned to Greece for permanent settlement.

In 1939, Katsimbalis married Aspasia Sakorrafo, the daughter of a university professor. The couple adopted a son, Giorgos Katsimbalis. During World War II, Katsimbalis served in the Greek army as an artillery lieutenant.

Katsimbalis died in Athens on June 25, 1978. He was buried in the first cemetery of Athens.

== Literary work ==
Katsimbalis published 43 bibliographical works, 19 Greek and 14 foreign scholars, while already in 1925 he presented in London, a translation of poems.

Katsimbalis was introduced to Henry Miller in the late 1930s in Athens by their common friend and writer Lawrence Durrell. Miller and Katsimbalis became close friends and that is described in Miller's book The Colossus of Maroussi. Patrick Leigh Fermor in an interview in 1978 said that George Katsimbalis' stories and friendship have greatly influenced his writings.

In the 1930s, Konstantinos Tsatsos was constantly pressuring Katsimbalis to write until one day Henry Miller pulled him aside and said, "Stop asking him to write. Katsimbalis will never write, he is a story teller and story tellers do not have any urge or need to write".

== Literature ==
- Κατσίμπαλης Γιώργος, in: Παγκόσμιο Βιογραφικό Λεξικό, vol. 4, Athens, Εκδοτική Αθηνών, 1985
- Αλέξης Ζήρας: Κατσίμπαλης Γιώργος, in: Λεξικό Νεοελληνικής Λογοτεχνίας, Athens, Εκδόσεις Πατάκη, 2007
