= The Donkey Rustlers =

1968 novel by Gerald Durrell

- First edition (publ. Collins)
- Author: Gerald Durrell
- Language: English
- Genre: Children's
- Publisher: Collins
- Publication date: 1968
- Publication place: United Kingdom

The Donkey Rustlers is a 1968 novel for older children by Gerald Durrell, the well-known British writer and naturalist.

== Plot summary ==
On a Greek island, two British children, Amanda and David, who regularly vacation on the island, make friends with two Greek children, Yani and another who has a speech impediment. Yani has financial difficulties which put him in danger of losing his land to the villainous local mayor. Together they embark on a plot to help Yani by abducting all the donkeys in the village. Amanda and David's father finds out what they are up to, but he ends up surreptitiously assisting them. After Yani's financial problems are solved, the villagers realise what the children were up to, but laugh it off as they are glad to see the mayor defeated.

== Structure ==
The Donkey Rustlers resembles stories by Enid Blyton, with children getting up to adventures and fooling adults in a way which would be unlikely to succeed in real life (although not all of the adults are fooled for all of the time, and it does touch on some mature issues in a few places). Readers have enjoyed its imaginative feel-good plot, and well-drawn characters and location. It is influenced by Durrell's own childhood on Corfu.
