= Birds, Beasts, and Relatives =

1969 book by Gerald Durrell

- First UK edition
- Author: Gerald Durrell
- Cover artist: Eileen Walton (UK edition)
- Language: English
- Series: Gerald Durrell's Corfu Saga
- Subject: Gerald Durrell's life in Corfu
- Genre: Autobiography
- Publisher: Collins (UK); Viking Press (US)
- Publication date: 1969
- Publication place: United Kingdom
- ISBN: 0140043853
- Preceded by: My Family and Other Animals
- Followed by: The Garden of the Gods

Birds, Beasts, and Relatives (1969) by British naturalist Gerald Durrell is the second volume of his autobiographical Corfu trilogy, published from 1954 to 1978. The trilogy are memoirs about his childhood with his family between 1935 and 1939, when they lived on the Greek island of Corfu.

As in the first book, the well-known My Family and Other Animals (1956), Durrell intersperses humorous family anecdotes with rich descriptions of the fauna and flora of Corfu. It was a formative period for his immersion in and enthusiasm for natural history. Published in 1969, this book followed the huge success of My Family. Durrell wrote Birds, Beasts and Relatives primarily to raise money for his animal-collecting expeditions.

== Summary ==
Birds, Beasts, and Relatives, like My Family and Other Animals, offers a series of autobiographical anecdotes from the Durrell family's five-year sojourn on the Greek island of Corfu between 1935 and 1939. The youngest child, Gerald was aged ten when his widowed mother moved her family to accompany her eldest son Lawrence Durrell and his wife Nancy from Bournemouth to Corfu. He had another older brother, Leslie, and older sister Margaret, often referred to as "Margo."

He does not present events in chronological order, and some of his accounts are semi-fictionalised. For example, Gerald's eldest brother Larry – developing as the novelist Lawrence Durrell – was not living with the rest of his family as depicted in these stories. He was married and living separately with his wife Nancy, who is not mentioned in these books.

The family are protected by their local friend, taxi-driver Spiro (Spyros "Americano" Chalikiopoulos) and mentored by the physician and polymath Dr. Theodore Stephanides, who provides Gerald with his education in natural history.

== Background and content ==
Durrell wrote Birds, Beasts, and Relatives in 1968. His literary agent, Curtis Brown were reportedly very happy with the manuscript, and the book was published a year later in 1969. It received positive reviews and has been in print ever since.

The book introduces new characters. Gerald makes a trip with his mother to London to visit Margo, who is temporarily there for medical treatment. Larry brings a new collection of highly eccentric friends and acquaintances into the Durrell home. The family are invited to a Corfiot wedding, and Gerry later witnesses the birth of the bride's first baby. Gerry visits an elderly countess, is made the gift of an owl, and has a grandly sumptuous meal (which later causes him to throw up).

== See also ==
- Anthrozoology
- The Book of Imaginary Beings
- Durrell family
