= Durrell family =

The Durrell family lived in India, Corfu, England and other places during the twentieth century. Their lives and travels were documented and made famous through their autobiographical writings, particularly those by Lawrence and Gerald. Other members of the family became notable in their own right. The TV series My Family and Other Animals (1987), the television film My Family and Other Animals (2005), the largely fictionalized TV series The Durrells (2016–2019), and the documentary What the Durrells Did Next were based on these writings.

Lawrence Samuel Durrell, Louisa Durrell and their children were all born in India during the British Raj. The Durrell children were fourth-generation settlers in India, their paternal grandmother Dora Johnstone and maternal grandfather George Dixie having also been born on the sub-continent.

Following Lawrence Samuel Durrell's death in 1928, Louisa Durrell and her three surviving younger children moved to the United Kingdom, where Lawrence had already been sent to be educated. In 1935, the Durrells moved to the Greek island of Corfu. They remained there until the summer of 1939, when the impending outbreak of World War II forced most of them to return to England. Gerald's autobiographical Corfu trilogy and several short stories give a somewhat fictionalised account of the family's time in Corfu, while Lawrence's Prospero's Cell, A Guide to the Landscape and Manners of the Island of Corcyra (1945) is assembled from his diaries and notebooks, mainly for the years 1937 and 1938.

== Family members ==
=== First generation ===
- Lawrence Samuel Durrell (born 23 September 1884, Dum Dum, Bengal, today West Bengal; died 16 April 1928, Dalhousie, Chamba, today Himachal Pradesh). The son of Samuel Amos Durrell (1851–1914), an official in the British Army's Ordnance Department in Bengal, and his second wife, Dora Maria Johnstone (1862–1943). Lawrence Samuel was a civil engineer working mainly on railway and construction projects in north-east India, eventually founding his own company of Durrell & Co. in Jamshedpur.
- Louisa Florence Dixie (born 16 January 1886, Roorkee, North-Western Provinces, today Uttarakhand; died 24 January 1964, Bournemouth, Dorset). Her father George Dixie was head clerk and accountant at the Ganges Canal Foundry in Roorkee. She met Lawrence Samuel Durrell while he was studying at the town's Thomason College of Civil Engineering and they married at St John the Baptist Church in Roorkee on 23 November 1910.

=== Second generation ===
- Lawrence George Durrell (born 27 February 1912, Jalandhar, Punjab; died 7 November 1990, Sommières, Gard). A writer and diplomat, Lawrence is best known for The Alexandria Quartet, in addition to his poetry and travel writings.
- Margery Ruth Durrell (born 12 November 1915, Mymensingh, Bengal, today Bangladesh; died 10 April 1916, Bengal). Succumbed to diphtheria.
- Leslie Stuart Durrell (born 10 March 1917, Mymensingh, Bengal, today Bangladesh; died 13 August 1982, Kensington, London). Remembered for his fascination with guns and shooting — as depicted in Gerald Durrell's Corfu trilogy — Leslie was also a talented painter, but lacked the application to develop his gift. Rejected by the Royal Air Force due to his defective hearing, he spent the war living in Bournemouth with his mother and working in an aircraft factory, a disappointment he always remembered with bitterness. He also continued his unacknowledged relationship — which had begun on Corfu — with the family's Greek maid, Maria Condos, ten years his senior. In September 1945 the liaison produced a son, Anthony Leslie Condos. Leslie abandoned Maria, who raised Anthony on her own, with some initial financial assistance from Louisa and with enduring moral support from Margo, but otherwise in considerable hardship. By 1947 Leslie had moved in with the genial Bournemouth divorcee Doris Irene Hall née Wheeler (1905–1990), who ran the local off-licence, and for whom he had sometimes done beer deliveries. They married in 1952 and by year's end had emigrated to Kenya, where Leslie was to manage a farm. They fled the country in June 1968 "with only the clothes they stood up in and £75 between them", after Leslie, lately working as bursar at a school near Mombasa, was accused of misappropriating "a substantial sum". (Margo alludes to earlier possible episodes of dishonesty, while Gordon Bowker describes Leslie as "prone to confidence trickery" and "dicing with the law".) After a period living with, then near, Margo, and receiving no comfort from his brothers, Leslie moved with Doris to London, where by 1970 they were working as caretakers at a block of flats in Marble Arch — a job that came with a basement flat. During this time he wrote a children's book, Where the Rivers Meet, which remains unpublished, and may have been planning an autobiography. At the height of summer in 1982 Leslie died of a heart attack at a pub near Notting Hill Gate, where he told regulars he was a civil engineer. Douglas Botting suggests that Doris and her son Michael Hall (b. 1933) were the only people to mourn his passing. Maria Condos, whose attachment to Leslie never diminished, was incapacitated by Alzheimer's disease, and none of his siblings attended the funeral.
- Margaret Isabel Mabel (Margo) Durrell (born 4 May 1919, Kurseong, Bengal, today West Bengal; died 16 January 2007, Bournemouth, Dorset) She had two brief marriages. The first was in 1940 to Imperial Airways flight engineer John N. Breeze, known as Jack, whom she had met on Corfu. Jack was immediately posted to South Africa, and the couple spent the war years gradually advancing north to Mozambique, then Ethiopia, then Egypt, before returning to England at war's end. Along the way they had two sons, Gerry and Nicholas. In 1947, after their divorce, Margo used her inheritance from her father to establish a boarding house across the street from her mother's house, with a view to supporting herself and her sons. Her guests included musicians, and her second marriage in 1951 was to Malcolm Lawrence Duncan (1930–1981), known as Mac, who at the time combined his National Service as a corporal in the Life Guards stationed at Bovington with evenings as a member of Ron Weldon's band in Bournemouth, playing jazz trombone. Duncan would go on to have some success as a jazz musician, playing with Ken Colyer and visiting Americans such as Red Allen and George Lewis, as well as leading his own bands. The couple's son Malcolm died soon after his birth in 1952, and by 1954 Margo and Mac had separated. Margo describes her life as a single mother, member of the Durrell clan, and boarding-housekeeper in Whatever Happened to Margo?, which was published in 1995, decades after she wrote it. The Times described it as a "charming book" with "the full quota of the Durrell wit".
- Gerald Malcolm Durrell (born 7 January 1925, Jamshedpur, Bihar and Orissa, today Jharkhand; died 30 January 1995, St Helier, Jersey). A popular naturalist, best-selling writer, television host and conservationist, Gerald founded the Durrell Wildlife Conservation Trust and is credited with redefining the modern zoo. His first wife, Jacqueline Sonia Wolfenden (b. 1929), is an author, naturalist and television host; the couple divorced in 1979. His second wife, Lee McGeorge (b. 1949), is an author, naturalist and honorary director of the Durrell Wildlife Conservation Trust.
