= My Family and Other Animals (TV series) =

- Based on: My Family and Other Animals by Gerald Durrell
- Written by: Gerald Durrell
- Screenplay by: Charles Wood
- Directed by: Peter Barber-Fleming
- Starring: Darren Redmayne; Hannah Gordon; Brian Blessed; Anthony Calf; Guy Scantlebury; Sarah-Jane Holm; Christopher Godwin
- Theme music composer: Daryl Runswick
- Country of origin: United Kingdom
- Original language: English
- No. of episodes: 10

Production
- Producer: Joe Waters
- Running time: 5 hours
- Production company: BBC

Original release
- Network: BBC1
- Release: 17 October – 19 December 1987

My Family and Other Animals is a 1987 British TV mini-series produced by the BBC and directed by Peter Barber-Fleming. It is based on Gerald Durrell's autobiographical book by the same name, My Family and Other Animals, which tells about the time his family spent on the Greek Island of Corfu in 1935–1939. The series consists of 10 episodes and was aired for the first time between 17 October and 19 December 1987.

== Plot ==
The show tells the story of the eccentric Durrell family who, tired of the rainy and unhealthy English climate, move to the sun-drenched Greek island of Corfu. The family consists of Gerry (young naturalist), his widowed mother (excellent cook), his eldest brother Larry (starting writer), another brother Leslie (mad about guns and boats) and sister Margo (who suffers from acne). In Corfu they experience a lot of adventures and befriend many interesting people, including Spìro, a taxi driver who lived for many years in Chicago where he learned to speak broken English, and doctor Theodore Stephanides, a polymath who, just like Gerry, adores nature and helps him explore the island's varied wildlife.

== Filming and production ==
The £2 million production was a combined effort by the BBC's Drama Department and Natural History Unit. Exterior scenes were filmed in Corfu in the summer of 1987. It was intended that there should be at least three minutes of natural history footage for every half-hour episode. To that end, twenty scorpions, ten praying mantises, three giant toads, a number of snakes, tortoises, terrapins, barn owls and pigeons trained to dance had been brought to Corfu, together with six hundred frozen mice, as food for the snakes. At the end of July 1987, Gerald Durrell flew out to Corfu to be present for the last few days of the filming. He gave invaluable advice to the production team at the scripting stage, demanding the power of veto over only one thing – the casting of his mother. He felt Hannah Gordon fitted the bill perfectly:

She's absolutely superb. She picks up beautifully my mother's slightly flustered, not-quite-with-it-half-the-time air, and not knowing, if the family were squabbling, whose side to take.

None of the family's three villas proved to be suitable locations fifty years on, and substitutes had to be found (for the record, the Villa Fundana near Skripero stood in for the Strawberry-Pink Villa, the Curcumeli Villa at Afra was used for the interiors of the Daffodil-Yellow Villa and the Bogdanos Villa near Pyrghi for the exteriors, while the Snow-White Villa was impersonated by Kyriakis' House at Poulades).

To celebrate the end of the filming, Gerald Durrell sent out a home-made invitation, decorated with his cartoon animals, for all concerned to come to a party and barbecue at the grand old Curcumeli mansion at Afra:

The Real Durrells invite the Other Durrells, Spiro, Theo and all who worked on the production (even the Producer). For the sake of the reputation of the BBC, please endeavour to remain sober for at least fifteen minutes.

== Cast ==
- Darren Redmayne as Gerry (Gerald Durrell) – 10 episodes
- Hannah Gordon as Mrs. (Louisa) Durrell – 10 episodes
- Brian Blessed as Spiro Halikiopoulos – 10 episodes
- Anthony Calf as Larry (Lawrence Durrell) – 10 episodes
- Guy Scantlebury as Leslie Durrell – 10 episodes
- Sarah-Jane Holm as Margo (Margaret Durrell) – 10 episodes
- Christopher Godwin as Dr. Theodore Stephanides – 7 episodes
- John Normington as Kralefsky – 3 episodes
- Dina Konsta as Lugaretzia – 3 episodes
- Paul Rhys as George (Wilkinson) – 2 episodes
- Angela Barlow as Mrs. Harcum – 2 episodes
- George Dialegmenos as Kosti the convict – 2 episodes
- Tonis Giakovakis as Dr. Androuchelli – 2 episodes
- Mihalis Giannatos as Yani – 2 episodes
- Edward Parsons as Mr. Harcum – 2 episodes
- Christos Efthimiou as Theodosius – 1 episode
- David Gant as Zatopec – 1 episode
- Bob Goody as Durant – 1 episode
- Philip Herbert as Michael – 1 episode
- Ayub Khan-Din as Yasha – 1 episode
- Evelyn Laye as Mrs. Kralefsky – 1 episode
- Charmian May as Melanie, Countess de Torro – 1 episode
- Cathy Murphy as Jonquil – 1 episode
- Stathis Psaltis as the Rose-Beetle Man – 1 episode
- Nick Reding as Peter – 1 episode
- Evagelia Samiotaki as Agathi – 1 episode
- Hristos Valavanidis as the customs officer – 1 episode

== Soundtrack ==
The soundtrack to the show was written by Daryl Runswick. It includes the following tracks:

1. Main Theme
2. The Rose-Beetle Man
3. Caterpillars and Spiders
4. Spiro and the Scorpions
5. Sleep and Cypresses
6. Gerry and Roger

Whistler: Ken Barrie.
Singer: Mary King.
