= State Street Investment Management =

Global investment management division of State Street Corporation

- Type: Subsidiary
- Industry: Investment management
- Founded: 1978; 48 years ago
- Headquarters: One Congress Street; Boston, Massachusetts, U.S.
- Key people: Yie-Hsin Hung (CEO)
- Products: Asset management; Wealth management
- AUM: ▲US$5.7 trillion
- Number of employees: 2,500+
- Parent: State Street Bank and Trust Company
- Website: www.ssga.com

State Street Investment Management (formerly State Street Global Advisors) is the asset management arm of State Street Corporation founded in 1978 and the world's fourth largest asset manager, with nearly US$4.1 trillion in assets under management as of December 31, 2023. State Street Investment Management operates as a subsidiary of State Street Bank and Trust Company.

The company services financial clients by creating and managing investment strategies for governments, corporations, endowments, non-profit foundations, corporate treasurers and CFOs, asset managers, financial advisors and other intermediaries around the world. State Street Investment Management employs 2,500 people in 28 countries.

== History ==
State Street Global Advisors, the asset management division of State Street Corporation, was founded in 1978 in Boston, Massachusetts.

Its first three products were a domestic index fund, an international index fund (based on the MSCI EAFE index), and a short-term investment fund. By 1989 the division had $53 billion (USD) in assets under management.

In 1990 State Street Global Advisors was formed as a separate entity from State Street Bank with the mission of expanding globally: first London, 10 more international locations by 1994, with 15 by 1999.

SSGA invented the investment vehicle known as the exchange-traded fund (ETF) in 1993 with the introduction of the S&P 500 SPDR product (NYSE Arca: SPY), which is traded on the American Stock Exchange. SSGA is the number three ETF manager in the world after BlackRock and Vanguard.

Assets under management climbed to $161 billion (USD) in 1994 and more than quadrupled to $667 billion by 1999.

As of 2006, one-third of assets under management were from non-US investors.

- In 2003, State Street Global Advisors' Boston office moved to the newly completed State Street Financial Center building at One Lincoln Street.
- State Street Global Advisors launched the first foreign real estate ETF in 2006 (NYSE Arca: RWX), which provides investors in the US an easy way to access the international housing and commercial development markets.
- In January 2011, State Street Global Advisors completed its acquisition of Bank of Ireland Asset Management (BIAM). The acquisition was first announced in October 2010 for approximately €57 million. State Street Global Advisors's presence in Ireland, which began 1996, had by 2010 grown to "more than 2,000 local employees."

State Street Investment Management is among the signatories of the "Principles for a Responsible Civilian Firearms Industry," which seeks to engage firearms manufacturers, dealers, and retailers in promoting gun safety.

In 2025, State Street Global Advisors rebranded as State Street Investment Management and unveiled a new corporate logo, matching that of parent company State Street Bank.

In January 2026, it was announced State Street Investment Management had agreed to acquire a 23% stake in Groww Asset Management, an Indian asset management company and subsidiary of Billionbrains Garage Ventures, for up to $64.2 million (₹5.8 billion). The transaction, which remains subject to regulatory approval, is intended to strengthen State Street’s presence in the Indian asset management market.

== Products and services ==
State Street Investment Management creates customized investment strategies for institutions. SSGA manages the assets for clients by setting up commingled funds (otherwise known as common trust funds).

In addition to institutional products, State Street Investment Management has 46 ETF investment products in the US market, as of March 2007. The ETFs track international and domestic indices based on market capitalization, investment style, sector, industry, or commodity. ETF products are also available in other parts of the world such as Belgium, France, Hong Kong, and Singapore under the streetTracks brand.

The company has 26 Mutual Fund products divided by investment type: money markets, bonds, equities, and diversified funds of funds (also known as life style funds).

State Street Investment Management partners with seven companies in various markets to produce local investment strategies for clients. They are Advanced Investment Partners; Asian Direct Capital Management; GovernanceMetrics International (GMI); Innovest Strategic Value Advisors, Inc.; Rexiter Capital Management Limited; Shott Capital Management, LLC; SSARIS Advisors, LLC; The Tuckerman Group, LLC; and Wilton Asset Management, LLC.

== Fearless Girl ==
In March 2017, State Street Global Advisors commissioned a statue, Fearless Girl by Kristen Visbal, and located it temporarily in the Financial District, Manhattan, in front of the Wall Street icon Charging Bull. The statue is an advertisement for an index fund which comprises gender diverse companies that have a higher percentage of women among their senior leadership. While some have seen it as an encouragement of women in business, some women criticized the statue as "corporate feminism" that violated their own feminist principles.

Up until 2025, thanks to Fearless Girl, State Street were known as a symbol of gender diversity in the workplace, and required at least 30% of company boards to be females or those companies would not be featured in State Street's index. Furthermore, State Street used to require companies featured in their index to disclose the gender, racial and ethnic composition of their boards, and to state their goals for diversity, equity and inclusion as part of overall business strategy. As of April 2025, these requirements had been dropped by State Street Investment Management without any announcement. Reuters explicitly tied this to political pressure to slow the pace of adding board members that are not white men.

== Lawsuits ==
In October 2007, several pension funds sued State Street Corp. for the alleged mishandling of several bond funds managed by SSGA.

In 2008, State Street Bank was sued by Trust Co. for Fixed Income Funds Investment. The case was settled in 2010.

In April 2009, a class action suit was filed against State Street, alleging SSGA chose illiquid, leveraged, and risky securities in their short-term, liquid fund products.

In October 2017, SSGA agreed to pay over $5 million in back pay and interest to settle allegations the company underpaid women and African-American employees.
