= List of 2019 Women's March locations =

This is an incomplete list of the 2019 Women's March events, most of which took place on January 19, 2019, some on January 20 or later (as noted), and a few before (also as noted).

== United States ==
Listed below are the marches in the U.S. in support of, or independent of, the 2019 Women's March.

- AL
- AK
- AZ
- AR
- CA
- CO
- CT
- DC
- DE
- FL
- GA
- HI
- ID
- IL
- IN
- IA
- KS
- KY
- LA
- ME
- MD
- MA
- MI
- MN
- MS
- MO
- MT
- NE
- NV
- NH
- NJ
- NM
- NY
- NC
- ND
- OH
- OK
- OR
- PA
- RI
- SC
- SD
- TN
- TX
- UT
- VT
- VI
- VA
- WA
- WV
- WI
- WY

	Photo	Approximate attendance	Notes
Washington, D.C.		100,000	Organizers submitted a permit application estimating up to 500,000 participants even though it was widely expected that the turnout would be smaller. The original location was at the National Mall, but a forecast of snow and freezing rain, plus a lack of plow service from the National Park Service due to the government shutdown, forced organizers on Thursday to change the march's location and route to Freedom Plaza, 1455 Pennsylvania Ave NW.

State	Date	Cities	Photo	Approximate attendance	Notes
Alabama		Andalusia			Andalusia's first Women's March was planned to take place around Andalusia Court Square, with at least 10 people signing up on Facebook.
Alabama	Mar. 23	Birmingham		50+	Birmingham's 2nd Women's March, which attracted dozens of people, began and ended at A.H. Parker High School, on the city's west side, because of its proximity to both the Smithfield Community and “Dynamite Hill,” where Dr. Angela Davis and other civil rights leaders hailed from. Organizers specifically set the date of March 23 apart from the 2019 National Women's March in January. Gun control groups, Planned Parenthood, and other women's health organizations were stationed outside the school at informational booths. The inclusive march was set up in response to both the Thanksgiving night shooting of Emantic “E.J.” Bradford and controversy over the recent decision by the Birmingham Civil Rights Institute to strip Davis of a prestigious award (due to past comments she made criticizing Israeli policy).
Alabama		Mentone			pavilion behind the Mentone Inn on AL-117
Alabama	Jan. 26	Montgomery		few dozen	Dozens of people met at the Court Square Fountain on Dexter Ave and marched to the steps of the Capital Bldg. The march & rally was organized by Montgomery Pride United (MPU), which fights for women's and LGBT rights. The marchers were met by counter-protesters who yelled anti-gay and anti-abortion slogans.
Alaska		Anchorage		0	No 2019 women's march was planned for Anchorage, and organizers of the city's 2018 march, which drew an estimated 3,000 demonstrators, seemed to be unclear on why. As for Alaska's other cities & towns, about 1,000 women altogether participated this year (a precipitous drop from participation in past years)
Alaska		Bethel		40+	Yupiit Piciryaraitat Cultural Center (during the K300 sled dog race)
Alaska		Fairbanks		200+	Cowles & Airport - Ryan Middle School
Alaska		Homer		500	Participants met at the Homer Education and Recreation (HERC) Parking lot, and marched down Pioneer Avenue to WKFL Park Gazebo
Alaska		Juneau		650	Capitol Building - Centennial Hall. Participants dressed in red in solidarity with Native women who have gone missing or been killed. State Rep Sara Hannan & US Senate candidate and Democrat Jesse Kiehl attended the Juneau march.
Alaska		Nome		25-30	Subway parking lot. In this event, both pro-choice and pro-life people marched side by side, with respective signs and without conflict.
Alaska		Seward		20	event held at Rae Building (Third and Railway)
Alaska		Sitka		350	Crescent Harbor Shelter - St. Michael's Orthodox Cathedral. Hundreds gathered and marched in solidarity of Alaska Native women, who have reported rates of domestic violence up to 10 times higher than in the rest of the United States.
Alaska		Valdez		dozen(?)	Egon Drive; Valdez High School students led the march
Arizona		Flagstaff		500	Flagstaff City Hall; Together We Will Northern Arizona (TWWNAZ). US Rep Tom O'Halleran showed up
Arizona	Jan. 20	Kingman		20	Locomotive Park; Women's March Mohave County 2019
Arizona		Payson		150	The Payson Women's March met at Big Lots Parking Lot and headed west on State Rte 260. A counter-protest was held by the Payson Tea Party and Republican Club at the corner of Beeline Highway and Main St
Arizona		Phoenix		6,700	Arizona State Capitol; theme: "Rising Together." The one-mile loop march was led by Indigenous women.
Arizona		Prescott		1,000+	The Courthouse Square; Yavapai County Women March On
Arizona		Sedona		500	People from all over the Verde Valley met at the National Bank of Arizona and marched a mile along State Route 89A to Vino Di Sedona. Sedona Mayor Sandy Moriarty spoke at the end rally.
Arizona	Jan. 20	Tucson		5,000	Jacome Plaza at Joel D. Valdez main library. Tohono O'odham and indigenous women led the march around the Plaza
Arkansas	Feb. 2	Fayetteville		hundreds	The Northwest Arkansas (NWA) Women's March was held at Fayetteville Square on Saturday, February 2 (postponed from January 19 due to winter weather). Mayor Lioneld Jordan declared February 2 the official Women's March Day in Fayetteville.
Arkansas		Little Rock		hundreds	Hundreds met at the Arkansas State Capitol for the 9th Annual Rally for Reproductive Justice (moved inside due to weather). Hundreds would meet again at the capital Sunday for the annual March for Life.
California		Bakersfield		3,500+	The 3rd Women's March Kern County rally took place in Central Park at Mill Creek; US Rep TJ Cox, City Council member Andrae Gonzales & Assembly member Rudy Salas were all in attendance
California		Chico		hundreds	Chico Downtown Plaza. In addition to feminism and indigenous rights, the rally also addressed climate change & environmental advocacy, as attendance was slightly affected by the November 2018 Camp Fire devastation of Paradise, CA.
California		Eureka		900	Original march cancelled w/in a month of January 19 over concerns that its participants would be “overwhelmingly white”. Former Eureka city council member Linda Atkins committed to a new march (Madaket Plaza 1st & C Streets), in spite of suffering a heart attack over the weekend of January 12 and being threatened with boycotts by the original march organizers
California		Fort Bragg		37	Fort Bragg Town Hall, N. Main Street
California		Fresno		3,000	234 E. Nees Ave. The organizer of the Fresno march estimated the turnout to be around 3,000 people, based on Facebook event interest. The event was countered by a dozen Trump supporters on the sidelines waving "Trump 2020" flags"
California		Hemet		60	Gibbel Park - Denny’s Restaurant
California		Lakeport		60+	outside the Lakeport Courthouse (in the rain)
California		Long Beach			Demonstrators from Long Beach mostly went to the rally in Los Angeles, via charter buses at Harvey Milk Promenade Park and Michelle Obama Public Library.
California		Los Angeles		200,000 - 250,000	About 200,000 people marched in Los Angeles from Pershing Square, to Grand Park and the City Hall. LA Mayor Eric Garcetti, US Rep Katie Hill & and State Sen Maria Elena Durazo (D-Los Angeles) were present. Actress and filmmaker Jennifer Siebel Newsom (who, as the spouse of newly elected Governor of California Gavin Newsom, picked the title "First Partner" over "First Lady"), spoke about pay inequality for women and a lack of diversity across all industries. Other celebrity supporters included Anjelica Huston, Sarah Hyland, Laverne Cox, singers Lance Bass, Raja Kumari & Ingrid Michaelson, Connie Britton, Evan Rachel Wood, Lea Thompson, Ricki Lake and Marisa Tomei. Sculptor Kristen Visbal spoke next to her creation Fearless Girl.
California		Modesto		400+	Briggsmore & McHenry Ave - Graceada Park Pavilion. Newly elected officials Rep Josh Harder & state Sen Anna Caballero, who both flipped their districts in the midterms, were present.
California		Monterey		2,000	Colton House - Monterey Wharf - Custom House Plaza. Monterey Mayor Clyde Roberson spoke to the crowd. With controversy brewing at Women's March, Inc over race & antisemitism, the 2019 Women's March Monterey Bay (WMMB) operated under the umbrella of Women's March California. One of the organizers, Vanessa Wruble, had been involved with the first 2017 Women's March, but was asked to leave shortly thereafter because of, as she claimed to the New York Times, her Jewish heritage. Wruble later co-founded March On, an organization that provides support and guidance to women-led groups across the country, with an estimated half of Saturday's 2019 sister marches getting help from said organization.
California		Napa		thousands	City Hall - criminal courthouse near 3rd & Main Streets. US Rep Mike Thompson was present
California		Nevada City		100	Robinson Plaza - Nevada City Winery
California		Oakland		8,000 - 10,000	Lake Merritt Amphitheater (morning) - Frank Ogawa Plaza. The march drew between 8,000 and 10,000 (down from 60,000 - 70,000 in 2018). Rep Barbara Lee spoke at the Lake Merritt before she whisked across the bay to address demonstrators in San Francisco
California		Oceanside		1,000	Oceanside Public Library / Civic Center
California		Palm Springs		hundreds	Frances Stevens Park - Palm Canyon Drive; 2019 Coachella Valley Women's March
California		Pleasanton		800	Amador Valley High School; first Tri-Valley Women's March
California		Petaluma		500	Walnut Park
California		Redding		500	Some 500 people walked along Cypress Ave (in the rain & cold) from Redding City Hall; less than 2 miles away, another 125 people in favor of a border wall stood at the intersection of Cypress Ave & Hilltop Drive
California		Redondo Beach		300 - 400	Ruby's Diner (north end of Ruby's Parking Lot) - Catalina - rally at Veteran's Park
California		Riverside		4,000	Historic Riverside Courthouse; Inland Empire Women's March
California		Sacramento		10,000	Southside Park - California State Capitol
California		San Diego		20,000	Waterfront Park / County Administration Center
California		San Francisco		30,000	60,000 people were expected at Civic Center Plaza; only half of that number reportedly turned out. Also, donations fell $20,000 short of paying for the basic costs of the march. Present at the rally were San Francisco Mayor London Breed, US Rep Barbara Lee and newly reelected US House Speaker Nancy Pelosi.
California		San Jose		20,000	San Jose City Hall Plaza - Arena Green East
California		San Luis Obispo		3,000 - 5,000	Mitchell Park; Women's March SLO 2019 #TruthToPower
California		San Mateo		100	Downtown San Mateo, 300 S. El Camino Real. The rally (without a march) was co-sponsored by San Mateo Peace Action (SMPA) and the Raging Grannies Action League
California		Santa Ana		15,000	Orange County Women's March assembled at the corner of W. Civic Center Dr. and N. Flower St in downtown Santa Ana. State Sen. Connie Leyva & US Reps Katie Porter & Harley Rouda were present
California		Santa Barbara		3,000	De La Guerra Plaza; Women's March 2019: Truth to Power. State Sen Hannah-Beth Jackson addressed the crowd
California		Santa Cruz		20,000	Pacific Ave & Cathcart St - Santa Cruz courthouse. Santa Cruz Women's March organizer Cynthia Hawthorne said there were an estimated 20,000 marchers in attendance in Santa Cruz, less than the city's record 30,000 participants from 2018, but inspiring nonetheless.
California		Santa Maria		300	Buena Vista Park - Minami Park; Santa Maria's first ever Women's March. US Rep Salud Carbajal spoke
California		Santa Rosa		4,500	Old Courthouse Square
California		Sonoma		1,000	New Mayor of Sonoma Amy Harrington led the marchers around Sonoma Plaza
California		Sonora			event planned at Courthouse Park
California		Stockton		hundreds	Downtown Stockton held its first ever Women's March. One Women's Love Movement and the Younger Women's Task Force organized the march so people wouldn't have to travel as far as Sacramento to make their voices heard.
California		Ukiah		250	Alex Thomas Plaza
California		Vallejo		hundreds	Vallejo's Ferry Building - Decades, 350 Georgia St. Vallejo Mayor Bob Sampayan spoke and Vallejo Poet Laureate D.L. Lang gave the invocation.
California		Ventura		500 - 700	Plaza Park Ventura. Police estimated 500-700 were on hand, although some thought the crowd may have exceeded 1,000 (only half the number from 2018). US Rep Julia Brownley spoke
California		Visalia		300	Oval Park
California		Walnut Creek		thousands	Women's March Contra Costa took place at Civic Park Community Center. Walnut Creek police removed a male counter-protester for disrupting the event on stage following US Rep Mark DeSaulnier's speech to the crowd
Colorado		Alamosa			Richardson & Highway 160 - McDaniel Hall
Colorado		Aspen		60	Paepcke Park, atop Aspen Mountain; called "the highest elevation march" in the US
Colorado		Boulder		8	Frasier Meadows Women's March; gazebo in the park at Pawnee Drive - march around the pond
Colorado		Broomfield		100+	Community Park Amphitheater; Broomfield Women's March/Martin Luther King Walk
Colorado		Colorado Springs		1,300	City Hall - All Souls Unitarian Universalist Church; COS Womxn's March 2019 "Today we march, tomorrow we work!"
Colorado		Cortez		300	Cortez City Park
Colorado		Denver		80,000	Civic Center Park; Official Womxn's March Denver 2019. The new spelling of "Women's" with an "x" reflects the need for inclusion of LGBT people in the movement. Despite controversies the overall movement has faced, 80,000 protesters turned up for the Womxn's March in Denver (down from 100,000 in 2018)
Colorado		Durango		500	Train Station - Buckley Park
Colorado		Grand Junction		hundreds	Mesa County Old Courthouse - Rood Avenue
Colorado		Greeley		200	Greeley held two events: the Greeley Women's Resistance March at Weld County Countyhouse steps, & the Greeley Women's March Day Celebration at Lincoln Park. Trish Zornio, a scientist from the Colorado town of Superior, announced her bid to seek a Democratic nomination for US Senate in 2020, against Republican incumbent Cory Gardner
Colorado		Longmont			6th and Main Plaza; Unity Rally (post-Womxn's March)
Colorado		Montrose		500	Montrose Town Square, Demoret Park - Centennial Plaza
Colorado		Pueblo		hundreds	Pueblo County Courthouse
Colorado		Steamboat Springs		100	Bud Werner Memorial Library - Routt County Courthouse
Colorado		Telluride		hundreds	San Miguel County Courthouse - Elks Park
Colorado		Trinidad		11	intersection of Main St and Santa Fe Trail
Colorado		Vail		30	Vail Valley Women's March; Vail Covered Bridge
Connecticut		East Haddam		50+	Two Wrasslin' Cats coffee house
Connecticut		Hartford		2,500 - 3,000	Corning Fountain in Bushnell Park - Capitol North Steps. Supporters & speakers included Gov. Ned Lamont, his wife Ann Lamont, Lt. Gov. Susan Bysiewicz, US Rep Jahana Hayes & US Sen Richard Blumenthal
Connecticut		Kent			Town Hall, Kent Green
Connecticut		Pomfret		40	Junction Rtes 169 & 44, opposite Vanilla Bean Café
Delaware		Lewes			Lewes School / Sussex Consortium
Delaware		Newark		200+	Unitarian Universalist Fellowship of Newark
Florida	Jan. 20	Daytona Beach		175	intersection of International Speedway Boulevard and Beach Street - Broadway Bridge
Florida	Jan. 27	Florida City			Covenant Missionary Baptist Church; event planned by Women's March Miami
Florida	Jan. 20	Fort Myers		400	Centennial Park - Lee County Courthouse. US Rep Debbie Wasserman Schultz, who refused to participate in the 2019 Washington March, spoke at this one instead.
Florida		Gulfport		50-100	Courtyard - Vintage Small Bites; First Annual Women's March on Gulfport
Florida		Jacksonville		200+	Hemming Park - Supervisor of Elections office; Women's Wave Jax
Florida		Key West		hundreds	Duval Street - Mallory Square
Florida		Melbourne		hundreds	Eau Gallie Causeway; Brevard Women's March 2019
Florida		Miami		0	Women's March Miami 2019 had planned an event on Bayfront Park, but cancelled.
Florida		Naples		120+	Broad Ave & Fort Street South - Cambier Park; Collier County Women's March & Rally. Naples Mayor Bill Barnett was present.
Florida		Orlando		hundreds	Lake Eola Park; Truth to Power Florida; This sister march took place alongside the Martin Luther King parade. The rally drew a handful of counter-protesters, who briefly interrupted the speakers with shouting over megaphones.
Florida		Panama City		dozens	Carl Grey Park - Hathaway Bridge; (Jan 20) Panama City Beach
Florida		Pensacola		hundreds	City Hall - Seville Square
Florida		St. Augustine		hundreds	Davis Park - Castillo De San Marcos; event hosted by Women's March St. Johns. Activist Dorothy Pitman Hughes spoke
Florida	Jan. 20	St Petersburg			event planned; 3500 Pinellas Bayway
Florida		Sarasota		600	Marina Jacks, Bayfront Park; Unconditional Surrender Statue - John Ringling Causeway Bridge. An estimated 600 people attended (down from more than 7,000 in 2018). The event might have not happened at all if it weren't for a Sarasota High School senior, Jasmine Graziela
Florida		Tallahassee		few hundred	Railroad Square Art District - Florida Capitol
(Georgia (U.S. state)) Georgia		Atlanta		100+	Adair Park, Atlantia Beltline Westside Trail; KIPP Strive Academy - Atlanta Women's March to 2020. US Rep Lucy McBath, President & CEO of Planned Parenthood Southeast Staci Fox & former mayor of Columbus, GA Teresa Tomlinson spoke to the small crowd
(Georgia (U.S. state)) Georgia		Augusta			Augusta Commons Area
(Georgia (U.S. state)) Georgia		Gainesville		30	Eternal Flame monument, Roosevelt Sq - Waldorf & Wonder, inside Main St Market
(Georgia (U.S. state)) Georgia	Jan. 20	Savannah			104 East Harris St
(Georgia (U.S. state)) Georgia		Statesboro			event planned on East Main St.
Hawaii		Hilo		several hundred	Hawaii State Building, Aupuni St
Hawaii		Honolulu			An event for Honolulu was planned for the Jan 19–20, 2019 weekend
Hawaii		Kahului (Maui)		2,000	UH-Maui Campus - Front Lawn
Hawaii		Kailua-Kona		100+	Lanihau Center; "Scores came out" for the Kona Women's March
Idaho		Boise		several hundred	Idaho State Capitol; 3rd annual Idaho Womxn's March / Socialist contingent at 6th & Bannock. Although 3,000 were expected at this year's march, it's unclear how many people attended. Former White House communications director Jennifer Palmieri & State Sen Cherie Buckner-Webb (D-Boise) spoke
Idaho		Idaho Falls		200	Idaho Falls Public Library Plaza; march across the Broadway Bridge. Idaho Falls Mayor Rebecca Casper spoke
Idaho		Ketchum		~50	Ketchum Town Square. State Rep Muffy Davis & State Senator Michelle Stennett were among those chosen to talk
Idaho		Moscow		1,000	East City Park - Women's March on the Palouse
Idaho		Sandpoint		400 - 500	Sandpoint Middle School; N. Idaho Women's March
Idaho		Twin Falls		~100	Event planned at 203 Main Avenue E
Illinois		Chicago		200 - 300	No Chicago 2019 women's rally was originally or officially planned (at least not on the scale of 2017 or 2018), but marchers held a relatively small one anyway - the Young Women's March Rally at Federal Plaza, Adams & Dearborn (in snowy weather).
Illinois		Carbondale		150	Carbondale Civic Center
Illinois		Geneva		500 - 750	Old Kane County Courthouse / Geneva History Museum. State Rep Linda Chapa LaVia spoke at the rally, as did US Reps Lauren Underwood, Raja Krishnamoorthi, and Sean Casten, and Geneva Mayor Kevin Burns.
Illinois		New Lenox		100	New Lenox Commons. US Rep Robin Kelly spoke
Illinois	Mar. 9	Peoria		hundreds	Gateway Park 200 Northeast Water St; the third annual Peoria Women's March was rescheduled from January, due to snowy weather, to March 9 (albeit with rainy weather).
Illinois		Rockford		270	Rockford City Market. US Rep Cheri Bustos spoke
Illinois		Urbana			Event planned at UIUC Main Quad
Illinois		Woodstock		100	Woodstock Square Historic District
Indiana	Feb. 9	Fort Wayne		75	Allen County Court House - Allen County Public Library
Indiana		Evansville			An event was planned to be held at the University of Evansville
Indiana		Indianapolis		few hundred	Monument Circle - American Legion Mall. The crowd, less than half the size of 2018's gathering, marched through rain and near freezing temperatures. Shelly Fitzgerald, a guidance counselor suspended from an Indianapolis Catholic school for being in a same-sex marriage, made a call for action at the Women's March in downtown Indy
Indiana	Jan. 20	Lafayette		0	Our Women's Wave march and rally was planned on Facebook to be held at Tippecanoe County Courthouse, but cancelled.
Indiana		Richmond			Event planned at Jack Elstro Plaza
Iowa		Decorah		0	Water Street Park next to Oneota Community Food Coop (canceled as of January 14)
Iowa		Des Moines		hundreds	Des Moines Capitol; "It's Time to March Again" (although the event was limited to an indoor rally on a cold winter's day). US Senator & recent presidential candidate Kirsten Gillibrand (D-NY) addressed the crowd inside the capitol building. Other guest speakers included US Rep Cindy Axne
Iowa		Dubuque		125	event held at Steeple Square; hosted by Indivisible Dubuque. State Rep. Chuck Isenhart and state Sen. Pam Jochum spoke at the rally.
Iowa		Iowa City		200	Downtown Pedestrian Mall, 201 Dubuque St
Iowa	Mar. 10	Red Oak			Legion Park; Southwest Iowa Women's March
Iowa	Jan. 20	Sioux City		~50	Sioux City Public Museum; Women Celebrating Women Event - the first women's event held in Sioux City (albeit not as a march). Newly elected state Senator Jackie Smith (D-IA) spoke at the meeting
Kansas		Lawrence		at least 8	A small group gathered in South Park and marched along Massachusetts Street.
Kansas		Pittsburg		50	Downtown Pittsburg; organized by the Southeast Kansas chapter of the National Organization for Women (SEK NOW)
Kansas		Wichita		hundreds	Theme of gathering, "Claim Your Voice." Due to snow and ice, instead of marching from the Keeper of the Plains to rally at City Hall - as they have done the past two years - participants marched from City Hall to Wave, where speakers energized the crowd with political calls to action. Democratic Kansas Gov. Laura Kelly's election last November also helped motivate people to rally.
Kentucky		Lexington		several hundred	Robert F. Stephens Courthouse Plaza, Fayette County. People marched with umbrellas in the rain
Kentucky	Jan. 27	Louisville		hundreds	Hundreds braved the bitter cold at Muhammad Ali Center for the Louisville Women's Rally (a stand-alone event not affiliated with National Women's March). Across from the center, a small group of counter-protesters with a loudspeaker made anti-abortion statements, which were drowned out by the rally's chants.
Kentucky		Pikeville		several dozen	Pikeville City Park; people marched in spite of rain
Louisiana		New Orleans		0	On December 29, 2018, The Baton Rouge chapter of NOW announced it would be canceling this march, owing to controversy over the Nation of Islam
Maine		Augusta		thousands	State Capital
Maine		Bangor		100+	Bangor Maine Womxn's March was held at West Market Square; another Bangor area women's march was held at Bangor Area Recovery Network at 142 Center St. in Brewer
Maine		Bar Harbor		270	Village Green Bar Harbor Maine
Maine		Bethel		35	Memorial Park - Crescent Park School
Maine		Brunswick			event planned at Maine Street Mall & Gazebo
Maine		Eastport			Shead High School front parking lot
Maine		Ellsworth		several dozen	City Hall - Main Street
Maine		Machias			The Dike at 100 Main St / Reynolds Center
Maine		Portland		1,000	Congress Square Park - City Hall
Maine		Waterville		80	Central Mainers for Change held the Waterville Equality Rally on steps of City Hall
Maryland	Mar. 2	Annapolis		200	Postponed by weather, the Third Annual Annapolis Women's Unity March was rescheduled to International Women's Day (March 2), starting at the Civil Rights Foot Soldiers Memorial and ending at Kunta Kinte-Alex Haley Memorial. Annapolis Mayor Gavin Buckley attended the rally.
Maryland		Baltimore		hundreds	City Hall / War Memorial Plaza. Organizers expected about 2,000 people for the city's third annual women's march - far fewer than the estimated 2018 attendance of more than 10,000. Baltimore Mayor Catherine Pugh addressed the crowd.
Maryland	Jan. 27	Frederick		300	Carroll Creek Linear Park
Maryland		Ocean City		26	Ocean City Boardwalk near the Inlet
Maryland	(Mar. 3)	Westminster		0	The Carroll County Women's March 2019 (Locust Lane - across from Library) was first postponed by winter weather from January 20 to early March, then cancelled altogether because of yet another winter storm.
Massachusetts		Ayer		100	A rally was held at Ayer Town Hall; speakers included US Rep. Lori Trahan, state Rep. Jennifer Benson & state Sen. Jamie Eldridge.
Massachusetts		Boston		10,000	Held at the Boston Common. Police estimated a minimum of 8,000, while organizers estimated as many as 45,000. A small group of Trump supporters stood near stage left, separated from the main crowd by police. US Rep. Ayanna Pressley spoke to the crowd. Sen. Ed Markey was present, but Sen. Elizabeth Warren was away due to a scheduling conflict.
Massachusetts		Falmouth		dozen	Falmouth Village Green - Congregational Church
Massachusetts		Lowell		~30	Ladd & Whitney Memorial / Mill No. 5; organized by Solidarity Lowell. US Rep. Lori Trahan spoke
Massachusetts		Martha's Vineyard		50	5 Corners - Washington Park
Massachusetts		New Bedford		hundreds	Women's March Southcoast met at Custom House Square, and marched along Acushnet Ave to downtown library on Pleasant St. New Bedford poet laureate Patricia Gomes & Dr. Kim Holland spoke to the crowd
Massachusetts		Northampton		1,000+	The march began at Sheldon Fields, with 400 people, and ended at Northampton City Hall steps, with 1,000 people
Massachusetts		Worcester			Wave Riders of Worcester; event planned at Union Station
Michigan	Jan. 26	Adrian		20	Lenawee County Courthouse
Michigan	Mar. 16	Ann Arbor		1,500+	Women's March Ann Arbor and Progressives at the University of Michigan hosted a rally and march at the Diag; US Rep. Debbie Dingell was one of the speakers. This event being held on March 16, a week after International Women's Day weekend, Rep. Dingell expressed sadness over the recent Christchurch mosque shootings in New Zealand the day before; hours after her remarks, a false-alarm “active shooter” scare on UM's campus caused a post-march vigil to end early in a panic as police came through the Diag.
Michigan		Detroit		1,000+	Charles H. Wright Museum of African American History (indoor rally, apart from snowy weather). Speakers included US Sen Debbie Stabenow, US Reps Debbie Dingell, Andy Levin & newly elected Rashida Tlaib, & Michigan Secretary of State Jocelyn Benson
Michigan		Benton Harbor			Benton Harbor/St. Joseph Women’s Unity March, which was to begin at Resiliency Plaza in Benton Harbor and make its way across the Blossomland Bridge, ending on the steps of the Berrien County Courthouse, was cancelled due to a snowstorm; organizers planned for a bigger event on March 16.
Michigan		Douglas (/Saugatuck)		200	Beery Baseball Field
Michigan	Jan. 20	East Lansing		500	MSU Union Michigan State University - Hannah Administration Building. Newly elected Governor Gretchen Whitmer spoke to the rally (no march included). Just days before the event, former Gov. John Engler resigned as interim university president amid outrage over a series of comments he made about the Larry Nassar sexual assault scandal.
Michigan		Grand Rapids		250	Calder Plaza (La Grand Vitesse sculpture) - march downtown. As the march was underway along snowy roads, witnesses reported (and captured on camera) a car lurching into the back of the crowd, posing a danger of running people over. The driver's intent remained unclear to either police or citizens, as no one was injured.
Michigan		Holland		400	Centennial Park - Holland Arts Council; Holland Women's March preceded by March for Life
Michigan		Harrisville		dozen	Alcona Coffee shop - shore of Lake Huron
Michigan	Jan. 20	Houghton / Hancock		80	Bridgeview Park - Portage Lake Lift Bridge
Michigan		Kalamazoo		200	Bronson Park
Michigan		Marquette		hundreds	Marquette Commons - post office
Michigan		Traverse City		few hundred	Protesters gathered at Workshop Brewing, and marched through Front Street and back again
Minnesota		Alexandria		few dozen	Organized by Indivisible West-Central MN; Douglas County Library / Big Ole-Viking Statue (wind chill -14 °F)
Minnesota		Barnum			Event planned at Barnum High School
Minnesota	Jan. 19 & Feb. 14	Bemidji		200+	(Jan 19) Over 100 people gathered for Bemidji's third Women's March, which made its way from BSU's Beaux Arts Ballroom down to the Paul and Babe statues. (Feb 14) More than 100 people marched yet again in Bemidji (from the Northwest Indian Community Development Center to BSU campus), this time to show solidarity for missing and murdered Indigenous women and their families. Following the march, participants gathered in the Hobson Memorial Union for songs and a healing dance.
Minnesota		Duluth		0	In the Twin Ports, organizers said that with respect for the historical and contemporary significance of Martin Luther King day, there would be no Women's March in Duluth that weekend
Minnesota	Feb. 14	Minneapolis		hundreds	MMIW: Missing & Murdered Indigenous Peoples March; Minneapolis American Indian Center - Little Earth Housing Community. This was Minneapolis' fifth such march; an advance release said a crowd of 500 to 600 participants was expected.
Minnesota		St. Cloud		100	Lake George Municipal Complex; WomensWave - St. Cloud - Tech High School
Minnesota		St. Paul		4,000	Western Sculpture Garden - Minnesota State Capitol; St. Paul police's estimate of 4,000 during the march was from before the marchers reached the Capitol. US Rep Ilhan Omar addressed the rally
Minnesota		Thief River Falls			Event planned at City Hall
Mississippi		Jackson		103	A "Womanist Rally" was held inside the Kundi Compound
Mississippi	Mar. 9	Long Beach			Event planned at Long Beach Town Green on March 9
Missouri		Columbia		100	Solidarity Rally moved indoors to Missouri Theatre from Courthouse Plaza (due to anticipated snow & cold)
Missouri		Kansas City		600	Unity Southeast In KC; Originally planned to run from Brookside Park to Swope Parkway, but bitter cold temperatures forced organizers into a shorter march from Unity Temple on the Plaza to JC Nichols fountain and back
Missouri		St. Louis		few hundred	Aloe Plaza; STL Women's March for Action
Missouri		Springfield		100	Park Central Square
Montana		Billings			event planned in Billings
Montana		Bozeman		1,000+	Women's March of Gallatin and Park County, Montana Hall, 8th & Babcock
Montana		Eureka			event planned at Glacier Bank Community Room
Montana		Great Falls		100+	Gibson Park - 2nd Ave. North & YWCA
Montana		Helena		250+	Women's March 2019 Helena MT; Women's Park
Montana		Kalispell		few hundred	The Kalispell Women's March drew hundreds to Depot Park. A Trump-supporting counter-protest attracted about a dozen people across the street.
Montana		Miles City			event planned at Range Riders Cafe & Mama Stella's Pizza
Montana		Missoula		500	Missoula Rises (Native Led MMIW Vigil) took place around the oval on University of Minnesota campus
Nebraska	Jan. 27	Lincoln		1,000+	The Women's March on Lincoln 2019 met at UNL Student Union and marched up Centennial Mall to the State Capitol. The event was postponed from the previous weekend due to snowy weather, and scheduled the day after Lincoln's annual March for Life on Saturday, Jan. 26
Nebraska	Mar. 10	Omaha		1,500	What was originally known as the Omaha Women's March was renamed the Omaha Women's Day March, and rescheduled from January 20 to March 10 (weekend of Int'l Women's Day). Thousands of men and women, young and old, marched around City Hall in downtown Omaha.
Nebraska		Wayne		50+	2nd annual Wayne, NE sister march: Kanter Student Center, Wayne State College - downtown Wayne
Nevada		Las Vegas		300+	Llama Lot, N 10th Street; Empowering Women / Women's March in the valley; 9th Street - Lloyd D. George Federal District Courthouse
Nevada		Reno		2,000 - 5,000	Virginia Street Reno Arch - Reno City Plaza. Led by members of Great basin Native American Tribes and other Indigenous nations. Police estimated 2,000, organizers estimated as many as 5,000
New Hampshire		Concord		~1,000	At the New Hampshire State House, the rally's theme was "We've Only Just Begun." With hundreds of people coming, march organizers’ goals were to have around 1,000 at this year's march (compared with 7,000 in 2017). Senator Maggie Hassan, Rep. Annie Kuster, & newly elected Rep. Chris Pappas spoke.
New Hampshire		Jackson		40	Jackson Covered Bridge - Jackson Community Church
New Hampshire		Portsmouth		hundreds	Market Square - Seacoast Women's March 2019
New Hampshire		Wilton		34	Wilton Peace Action Women's Wave event held outside Wilton Public Library on Main Street Park
New Jersey		Asbury Park		hundreds	Boardwalk at 5th Avenue. US Rep Frank Pallone spoke
New Jersey		Atlantic City		1,000	Atlantic City Boardwalk; "Honoring the life of Fannie Lou Hamer"
New Jersey		Leonia		200	Leonia Middle School - Wood Park
New Jersey		Newark		50	Downtown Newark mayor's office; 50 people braved the cold rain and threat of a snowstorm to turn out for the rally
New Jersey		Trenton		0	This march, which would have gone from the New Jersey State House Annex to the War Memorial on Saturday, was canceled on Friday under a state of emergency because of the severe impending snowstorm
New Mexico		Alamogordo		30+	Otero County Courthouse - SW corner of 10th St & White Sands Blvd
New Mexico	Jan. 20	Albuquerque		4,500	Civic Plaza. Newly elected US Rep Deb Haaland spoke at the rally
New Mexico		Fort Sumner			Dallas Park
New Mexico		Las Cruces			Albert Johnson Park. Newly elected US Rep Xochitl Torres Small spoke at the rally
New Mexico		Santa Fe		2,500	Roundhouse - Santa Fe Plaza.
New York		Albany		hundreds	Jennings Landing - West Capitol Park
New York		Batavia		75	Jackson Square; The first Genesee County/GLOW Women's March
New York	Mar. 10	Buffalo		300	Niagara Square, outside Buffalo City Hall - march around downtown government buildings, including federal immigration court and the Erie County Holding Center; event organized by Western New York Peace Center. Originally scheduled for Sunday, January 20, but postponed by cold weather and snow to Sunday, March 10.
New York		Cobleskill		85	Veterans Memorial Centre Park
New York	Jan. 27	Elmira		200+	Wisner Park - Elmira College; postponed a week because of weather
New York		Fredonia		60	Gazebo at Barker Commons - Fredonia Grange Hall
New York		Glens Falls		60	Originally planned for Sunday, January 20 at Old Planned Parenthood, Warren & Oak Sts and paired with a Martin Luther King march and tribute celebration, but moved to Saturday at the Crandall Park ice skating pond because of the impending snow storm
New York		Hudson			7th Street Park
New York		Lake Placid			The New York State Union of Teachers (NYSUT) planned an event at Crowne Plaza Lake Placid & march to Adirondack Community Church.
New York		Lewis		50	3rd Annual Adirondack Women's March @ Lewis Cemetery behind the Congregational Church
New York		New York City		28,000	New York City ended up with two competing events, the result of a rift between organizers over inclusiveness and alleged anti-Semitism. The Women's March Alliance hosted the official march, kicking off on Central Park West (from Columbus Circle to Bryant Park, attendance 25,000). Meanwhile, Women's March NYC hosted a Women's Unity Rally in downtown Manhattan at Foley Square, four miles away, with a few thousand attending. One counter-protester, political activist Laura Loomer, interrupted opening remarks by WM-NYC director Agunda Okeyo, calling the event the "real Nazi march." Newly elected US Rep Alexandria Ocasio-Cortez spoke at both rallies. Also present, NYC Mayor Bill de Blasio, his wife first lady Chirlane McCray and Gloria Steinem; Yoko Ono took part in the march; actor Bryan Cranston waved to the marchers from a ledge outside the Broadway Theatre.
New York		Port Jefferson Station		100+	Resistance Corner / Long Island Highway
New York		Port Jervis		200	St. Peter's Lutheran Church
New York		Potsdam		30+	First Presbyterian Church / Potsdam High School
New York		Saratoga Springs		400	Canfield Casino & Congress Park. US Rep Paul Tonko spoke
New York		Seneca Falls		hundreds	held at Trinity Park during bitter cold & snow, which lessened the turnout. Also, the rally's original meeting place, the Women's Rights National Historical Park (First Amendment Space), was not available due to the government shutdown
New York		Syracuse		700	Everson Museum of Art - University United Methodist Church. A rally permit for this one-mile march was received a mere 18 hours earlier, following a shutdown-triggered cancellation of the original meeting spot at the James M. Hanley Federal Building
New York		Utica		hundreds	YWCA, Rutger St - Oneida Square
New York		Watertown		24	All Souls Unitarian Universalist Church
New York		Woodstock		800	Playhouse Lane - Andy Lee Field, via Mill Hill & Rock City roads
North Carolina	Jan. 12	Albemarle		150+	E.E. Waddell Community Center
North Carolina	Jan. 20	Asheville		thousands	Vance Monument, South Pack Square - Martin Luther King Jr. Park. Organizers expected 13,000 people to show up. The Citizen-Times did report thousands of people marching in downtown Ashville, though the crowd was smaller than in previous years and dwindled to hundreds near the destination.
North Carolina		Black Mountain		400+	Black Mountain Town Square
North Carolina	Jan. 26	Charlotte		5,000	Charlotte's Women's March split from the National Organization over anti-Semitism, and renamed itself the Women United March; rescheduled a week after MLK weekend festivities. First Ward Park looked like it was at full capacity of 5,000 people (half of the number that marched through Charlotte in 2017), but had plenty of room to mingle.
North Carolina	Jan. 26	Raleigh		1,000+	Fayetteville St - Halifax Mall
North Carolina	Jan. 26	Wilmington		hundreds	Innes Park - Riverfront Park at Federal Courthouse
North Dakota		Bismarck		200	North Dakota Heritage Center
North Dakota		Fargo		700	Fargo-Moorhead Women's March, Fargo Civic Center. Frigid temperatures reached a high of 2 degrees just before 3 pm, with wind speeds around 12 mph, which cut the rally route short, but didn't faze the marchers. Recently defeated US Senator Heidi Heitkamp was scheduled to speak at the rally but cancelled late Friday due to a death in the family.
North Dakota		Minot		few dozen	Minot State University
Ohio		Akron		several hundred	Akron held its first Women's March, despite freezing temperatures. Marchers gathered at the John F. Seiberling Federal Building on Main Street. The march began at noon, making a quick stop at the Sojourner Truth Building and ending at Summit Artspace
Ohio		Athens		300	Scripps Amphitheatre, Ohio University campus - Athens County Courthouse. Protesters suited up for a cold, rainy Saturday in Athens. The march was emcee'd by delfin bautista who a), as an individual, prefers "they/them" pronouns and a lower-case spelling of "their" name, and b) had recently been fired by the university as director of OU's LGBT Center, sparking personal outrage among local marchers.
Ohio		Cincinnati		100	The Ohio chapter announced on Friday, January 11, that Cincinnati's event (1,000 signed up, 5,900 interested) had been cancelled over logistics and financial barriers; Cincinnati Socialist Alternative posted plans on Facebook for a Saturday march at Sawyer Point
Ohio		Cleveland		750 - 1,000	Cleveland Public Square. Among the speakers was Susan Bro, whose daughter Heather Heyer was killed by a white nationalist from Ohio in Charlottesville, VA, and Samaria Rice, who became an activist after her son Tamir Rice was killed by a Cleveland police officer.
Ohio		Columbus		700	Washington Gladden Social Justice Park - Statehouse. Organizers had hoped to draw between 3,000 and 4,000 people, but the dire weather forecast had a definite effect on crowd size.
Ohio		Dayton		0	The event planned for Courthouse Square was canceled due to weather
Ohio		Chillicothe			Event planned at Ross County Courthouse
Ohio		Newark			Licking County Courthouse Square
Ohio		Wooster			Public Square
Oklahoma	Jan. 20	Oklahoma City		1,000	Oklahoma State Capitol. Indigenous women's groups led the Women's March in OKC on Sunday, which also accommodated Jewish women and groups who could not do a march on the Sabbath. US Rep Kendra Horn spoke at the rally
Oklahoma		Tulsa		600	Guthrie Green - John Hope Franklin Reconciliation Park (indoor rally at the Living Arts building, thanks to cold weather)
Oregon		Albany			Linn County Courthouse
Oregon		Astoria		hundreds	Heritage Square; Speak Truth Women's March
Oregon		Bend		3,000	Drake Park - Central Oregon Women's March (in the rain). The turnout of 3,000 was actually double what the organizers expected
Oregon		Brookings		68	68 people braved the rain while rallying in the streets of Brookings - at least double that of Port Orford
Oregon		Coos Bay		dozens	US Highway 101 near Coos Bay Boardwalk
Oregon		Corvallis		500+	Central Park - downtown Corvallis
Oregon		Eugene		2,500	Wayne Lyman Morse US Courthouse. State Rep Julie Fahey spoke.
Oregon		Grants Pass			Event planned at Riverside Park
Oregon		Klamath Falls		100	Parking Lot Main Library - South Sixth Street bridge
Oregon		McMinnville			McMinnville Community Center; Yamhill County's March for Human Rights
Oregon		Medford		hundreds	Hawthorne Park; theme:"Building Our Bench"
Oregon		Newport		150	Newport City Hall - Newport High School
Oregon		Port Orford		30	hosted by Indivisible North Curry County
Oregon	Jan. 19 & Mar. 3	Portland		2,100+ (total)	The Womxn's March & Rally for Action Portland rescheduled its official event from January to March 3, at Portland State University South Park blocks, to take place alongside International Women's Day (and not overshadow Martin Luther King Day weekend events); about 2,000 marched around Shemanski Park. Meanwhile, on January 19, a separate and relatively smaller event, the #MeToo Speak Out and Women's March, began at Terry Schrunk Plaza, and eventually met up, at Pioneer Courthouse Square, with another group, the Counter Rally for Reproductive Justice, which was held in opposition to the nearby anti-abortion group Oregon Right to Life rally.
Oregon		Salem		900	Women's March Salem took place at the Oregon State Capitol, with 900 in attendance. A handful of counter-protesters repeatedly tried to drown out the speakers throughout the rally but were blocked by rally participants who stood in front of them with signs.
Oregon		Sandy		60	3rd Annual Women’s March on Sandy, at Centennial Plaza
Oregon		The Dalles			event planned at Thompson Park
Pennsylvania		Beaver		~30	Beaver County Courthouse
Pennsylvania		Bethlehem		200	Bethlehem Public Library / Payrow Plaza
Pennsylvania	Feb. 16	Bradford		50	The Inaugural Bradford Women's March was held on Saturday, February 16, at Veterans Square
Pennsylvania		Carlisle		several hundred	Cumberland County Courthouse
Pennsylvania		Clarion		50	Veterans Memorial Park
Pennsylvania	Feb. 23	Doylestown			State & Main Streets - Rise Up in Light & Beloved Community Vigil
Pennsylvania		Hollidaysburg		150	Blair County Courthouse
Pennsylvania		Philadelphia		thousands	Like New York City, Philadelphia also had two competing marches, both taking place on the Benjamin Franklin Parkway. The march organized by Philly Women Rally began at Logan Square, and headed to the front of the Philadelphia Art Museum; Philadelphia Mayor Jim Kenney and Pennsylvania Attorney General Josh Shapiro spoke to the marchers. The other event (more of a rally), put together by Women's March Pennsylvania, took place several blocks away at LOVE Park; a third group of more than a dozen people with Philadelphia's Socialist Alternative gathered across from LOVE Park before joining. Though both rallies altogether consisted of thousands of participants, the crowds at the Philly Women Rally far exceeded the numbers at the LOVE Park march (not including those who visited both stages)
Pennsylvania		Pittsburgh		1,000	City County Building - Market Square; "Building Bridges Stronger Than Hate"
Pennsylvania		Reading		125	Rally was held in City Park. Cold temperatures precluded plans to march on Chestnut St, Eighth St and back.
Pennsylvania		Sharon		100	Women's March for Mercer, Lawrence and Butler counties
Pennsylvania		State College		40+	Centre County Women's March; Allen Street Gates - Sidney Friedman Parklet; hosted by Ni-Ta-Nee-NOW
Pennsylvania		Wilkes-Barre		150 - 200	Kirby Park
Rhode Island		Providence		175+	In May 2018, The Rhode Island Chapter of the Women's March split from the parent organization over the controversy re Louis Farrakhan's anti-Semitic comments, and changed its name to Rhode Island Womxn's Action Initiative (as per Denver, Seattle and several other cities). No official events or rallies were planned in RI for January 19, 2019 until just ten days prior, when organizer Liandra Medeiros managed to whip up a crowd of over 175 people at the Rhode Island State House in Providence. Speakers included State Rep Kathleen Fogarty and rally participant Shanna Klinger, who, as the niece of a Holocaust victim, had something to say about opposing fascism and hatred.
South Carolina		Charleston			Event planned at Arthur Ravenel Jr. Bridge
South Carolina		Greenville		~200	Falls Park on the Reedy River
South Carolina		Myrtle Beach		hundreds	Chapin Park
South Dakota		Custer		20	Way Park by the courthouse
South Dakota		Rapid City		800	Central High School - Downtown Rapid City
South Dakota		Sioux Falls		600	Holiday Inn Sioux Falls-City Centre. With sub-zero temperatures, it was unlikely to hold a march on Saturday that could match 2,500 people from 2018. Instead of postponing the event to a later day, organizers held it in indoors, in a conference room with a maximum capacity of 600 seats
Tennessee		Chattanooga		500+	Coolidge Park. On a rainy Saturday, a rally was held under the Walnut St Bridge. Because no marching permit was officially granted (partially due to lack of city funding), people were directed by police to remain on sidewalks when crossing the John Ross Bridge. Five women ignored this order and were subsequently arrested after walking into Market Street and blocking traffic
Tennessee		Johnson City		hundreds	Founders Park; Tri-Cities Women's March
Tennessee		Knoxville		500 - 1,000+	Organizers moved the Knoxville march from its previous location in Krutch Park, which in 2018 had more than 14,000 marchers, to the Midway at Chilhowee Park & Exposition Center for a bigger venue, in hopes of attracting 5,000 or 7,000. As poor weather would have it, between 500 and 1,000 people gathered in wind and rain, and a few hundred stuck around long enough to march downtown.
Tennessee	Jan. 19 & 26	Memphis		~400	On January 19, several hundred people marched from the Memphis City Hall courtyard to the Judge D'Army Bailey courthouse. On January 26, a legislative & action rally was held inside Clayborn Temple; US Rep Steve Cohen spoke before the crowd. Afterwards, the same march from the week before was held again.
Tennessee		Nashville		1,800	Public Square Park; Nashville's Women's March Rally. People showed up in spite of rain, but could not march because of the inauguration of Tennessee's next Governor, Bill Lee
Texas		Alpine			Alpine Municipal Building; "Big Bend Blue: The Next Step"
Texas		Amarillo		40	Elwood Park - Potter County Courthouse (march sponsored by Indivisible Amarillo)
Texas		Austin		1,500	March on Texas, which had organized the event at the Texas State Capitol in 2017 & 2018, said it would not arrange a local march for women this year, due to respective dwindling attendance and winter temperatures. However, the Texas Reproductive Rights Rally (TRRR) did host a rally on the Capitol steps, to address women's issues on the impending 46th anniversary of Roe v. Wade. Speakers included former state Sen. Wendy Davis, who had inspired the first Texas Reproductive Rights Rally in Austin, and state Rep Celia Israel. About 20 counter-protesters, including some from Texans United for America & Open Carry Texas, huddled on either side of the crowd carrying "Trump 2020" flags
Texas	Jan. 19-20	Dallas		10,000+	Three marches concerning women's rights (or lack thereof) took place in Dallas over the weekend of January 19–20. On Saturday, Women's March DFW hosted a "Women's Wave" march through City Hall Plaza, which was small in comparison to the 46th annual March for Life that was concurrently held outside the Dallas Federal Courthouse, with several thousand people. Both events were matched on Sunday by the Dallas Women's March, in which 10,000 people marched from St. Paul United Methodist Church to Dallas City Hall. State Rep Victoria Neave was present at the Sunday event
Texas		Denton		several hundred	Denton Courthouse Square; event known as Denton Womxn's Rally
Texas		El Paso		600	San Jacinto Plaza. The march was held ahead of President Trump's announcement of an offer to extend temporary protections for Dreamers in exchange for a border wall, which was not accepted by the protesters. Present at the rally were US Rep Veronica Escobar, who spoke out against Trump's offer, & former US Rep & 2018 senatorial candidate Beto O'Rourke (who attended but did not speak)
Texas	Jan. 20	Fort Worth		1,000+	Tarrant County Courthouse. The crowd was smaller than in the past (5,000 - 8,000) mainly because of freezing temperatures, but also because the rally was delayed by one day because a different event, the Stock Show & Rodeo Parade, was already scheduled downtown for Saturday (but ultimately canceled due to the weather)
Texas		Houston		10,000	Cistern Waterworks on Sabine - Houston City Hall. The event, titled "Houston Women March On", was affiliated not with Women's March Inc, but with March On. US Rep Al Green & newly elected US Rep Lizzie Fletcher spoke to the crowd
Texas		Huntsville			event planned at Walker County Democrats Club
Texas		Lubbock		several dozen	LCDP Headquarters / Tim Cole Memorial Park, corner of 19th & University
Texas		Palestine			Event planned at Palestine Farmer's Market
Texas		San Antonio		250	San Fernando Cathedral
Texas		Wichita Falls			Event planned at Sikes Senter Mall
Utah	Jan. 26	Cedar City		15	event planned at Church Auditorium, Southern Utah University Student Center
Utah		Logan		50	Historic Cache County Courthouse
Utah		Provo		300+	Utah County Historical Courthouse / Pioneer Park. The Provo Women's Wave Rally mainly focused on condemning sexual assault. A man who threatened rallygoers with violence was later sentenced to prison for misogynist terrorism.
Utah		Salt Lake City		hundreds	Washington Square Park - Utah State Capitol (I Am Salt Lake) / Matheson Courthouse (Utah Women's March). Salt Lake City Mayor Jackie Biskupski was present
Utah		St. George		150	Vernon Worthern Park. St. George Mayor Jon Pike & Hildale City Mayor Donia Jessop spoke
Vermont		Montpelier		700 - 1,000	Vermont State House. Former state Rep. Kiah Morris (D-Bennington) spoke to the crowd
US Virgin Islands		St. John		100+	Freedom Statue, Frank Powell Park; Cruz Bay march
Virginia		Bristol			Historic Bristol Sign
Virginia		Galax		14	The Intersection of 500 East Stuart Drive - Peace Pentagon Women's March
Virginia		Independence			Old Courthouse / 107 E. Main St; Peace Pentagon Women's March
Virginia		Lynchburg		200	Lynchburg Community Market
Virginia		Norfolk		few hundred	Mermaid Statue @ Town Point Park "The Girls Take Granby" Women's March
Virginia	Jan. 12	Richmond		hundreds	(Jan. 12) The two-mile reprise of the 2017 Women's March, at Arthur Ashe Athletic Center, was scheduled one week early so as not to distract from Martin Luther King Jr weekend activities. US Rep Abigail Spanberger & state Sen Jennifer McClellan (D-Richmond) were present. One issue addressed was passage of the Equal Rights Amendment (ERA), for which Virginia would be the 38th and final state needed to ratify it into the Constitution; other Virginia cities would follow likewise on January 19. / (Jan 14) Women's Equality Coalition Lobby Day, Virginia State Capitol. Up to 1000+ people attended
Virginia		Roanoke		500 - 1,000	Elmwood Park; 500-1000 people met in the rain. Djuna Osborne, who co-organized Roanoke's first women's march, was present for this one as a newly elected member of Roanoke City Council
Virginia		Staunton		100	Augusta County Circuit Courthouse; event hosted by SAW Joint Democratic Committee. Staunton Mayor Carolyn Dull was present.
Virginia		Williamsburg		hundreds	Capital Bldg, E Duck of Gloucester St; ERA Women's March
Virginia		Winchester		200	Old Courthouse Steps & Winchester Walking Mall
Washington		Ellensburg		400	5th & Main - City Hall; All Walking Together. Ellensburg Mayor Bruce Tabb spoke
Washington		Friday Harbor		250	San Juan County Courthouse lawn. Former San Juan County Commissioner Rhea Miller was the main speaker.
Washington		Longview		70	Longview Civic Circle
Washington		Olympia		thousands	Olympia Capitol - Heritage Park
Washington		Omak			march planned at Omak Park on Ash Street
Washington	Jan. 20	Port Townsend		1,000+	Quimper Mercantile - Pope Marine Park
Washington		Richland		500	John Dam Plaza
Washington	Jan. 19 & 20	Seattle		10,000+ (Saturday tally)	3 Women's Marches took place in Seattle over the weekend: (January 19) Womxn's March Seattle 2019 marched from Cal Anderson Park to Seattle Center, with 10,000 people (compared with 100,000 in 2017). Not too many politicians were seen at this event, but renowned Seattle chef Tom Douglas offered banana bread & tea to the marchers. (January 20) Be the Change Network's Women's March 3.0, starting at Westlake Park, promoted itself as more inclusive of Jewish women, in response to criticism of alleged anti-Semitism and the fact that many Jewish people declined to march on the Sabbath. The third group, Seattle Women's MMIW March (Missing and Murdered Indigenous Women) marched from Occidental Square Park to Seattle City Hall.
Washington		Spokane		3,000	Spokane Convention Center
Washington		Tacoma		0	Washington State Women's March voted to discontinue the Tacoma march due to the disagreement of support given by the national leadership to Louis Farrahkhan
Washington		Walla Walla		hundreds	Crawford Park at 4th & Main
Washington		Wenatchee		hundreds	The Chelan County Courthouse on Wenatchee Memorial Park was the scene of two separate opposing rallies on Saturday - the Wenatchee Right to Life Rally on the south side (400 people), and the 2019 Women's March on the east side (hundreds more). Washington State Attorney General Bob Ferguson addressed the latter, which concluded with a procession through the streets of downtown Wenatchee before arriving back at Memorial Park.
Washington		Yakima		400 - 1,000+	corner of 2nd St & Lincoln Ave - Millennium Plaza
West Virginia		Charleston		100	West Virginia Capitol
West Virginia		Romney		dozen	Hampshire Women's March 2019; Old Courthouse
Wisconsin		Bayfield			Apostle Islands National Lakeshore Headquarters
Wisconsin		Hayward		45	Hayward City Municipal parking lot
Wisconsin		Madison		700 - 800+	It was a bitterly cold day outside the Wisconsin State Capitol, following a snowstorm. Around 700-800 people showed up, just a fraction of the more than 75,000 people who joined the Women's March at the same location two years ago.
Wisconsin		Minocqua		0	Municipal Parking Lot; Women's March of the Northwoods (cancelled as of January 15 due to extreme weather)
Wisconsin		Wausau		dozen	Wausau's 400 Block; organized by Marathan Democratic Party
Wyoming		Cheyenne		500	Cheyenne Depot Plaza - Wyoming Supreme Court
Wyoming		Cody		103	Cody City Park
Wyoming		Gillette		50	Lasting Legacy Park
Wyoming		Jackson Hole		100	Home Ranch Visitor Center - Town Square
Wyoming		Pinedale		dozen+	American Legion Park

== Worldwide ==
Listed below are marches outside the United States in support of the 2019 Women's March.

- Afghanistan
- Argentina
- Australia
- Austria
- Bulgaria
- Canada
- Chile
- Costa Rica
- Denmark
- Ecuador
- Estonia
- France
- Germany
- Greece
- Ireland
- Israel
- Italy
- Japan
- Mexico
- Netherlands
- New Zealand
- Nigeria
- Norway
- South Africa
- Spain
- Sweden
- Switzerland
- Taiwan
- Thailand
- Uganda
- United Kingdom
- Zambia
- Zimbabwe

Country	Date	Locations	Photo	Approximate attendance	Notes
Afghanistan		Kabul			District 9
Argentina	Jan. 20	Buenos Aires			Embassy of the United States, Avenida Colombia
Australia	Jan. 20	Adelaide		69	Sixty-nine women stood on the seps of Adelaide's Parliament House, representing the number of women murdered across Australia in 2018
Australia	Jan. 20	Canberra		300-400	Garema Place
Australia		Melbourne		thousands	On Friday January 18, thousands of people gathered at vigils for Aiia Maasarwe, a 21-yr-old Israeli exchange student whose death in Melbourne was declared a homicide, with an arrest to boot. One major vigil was held on the steps of Melbourne Parliament House, where Maaserwe's father Saeed was present.
Australia	Jan. 20	Sydney		3,000	Thousands walked from Hyde Park to Belmore Park. Several people held signs paying tribute to Aiia Maasarwe.
Austria		Vienna			Democrats Abroad Austria joined the DA Global Women's caucus & Equal Means Equal Organization for an indoor event at Amerlinghaus, Stiftgasse 8, in support of the Equal Rights Amendment in the USA.
Bulgaria		Sofia			Bul. Vitosha Mountain, 66 Vitosha Blvd
Canada		Calgary (AB)		hundreds	Bankers Hall
Canada		Charlottetown (PE)		70	The Coles Building on Grafton St - Confederation Court Mall
Canada		Chilliwack (BC)			Ann Davis Transition Society; Fraser Valley March
Canada		Courtenay (BC)			400 Cumberland Rd; K'omoks Valley Women's March
Canada		Edmonton (AB)		200	Sir Winston Churchill Square; "Can't Stop, Won't Stop" rally
Canada		Fredericton (NB)		100+	City Hall - Fredericton Public Library
Canada		Hamilton (ON)			Women's march planned for Hamilton; Queen Elizabeth Park - Hamilton City Hall (indoor gathering on education and local action)
Canada		Huntsville (ON)		60	Huntsville Place Mall; Women's March Muskoka 2019
Canada		Kamloops (BC)		200	Sandman Centre
Canada		Kelowna (BC)		15	Water Street
Canada		Lethbridge (AB)		dozens	Annual March on Solidarity Rally; Mayor Magrath Drive by Nikka Yuko Japanese Gardens
Canada		Montreal (QC)		200	Place Émilie-Gamelin; -22 °C
Canada		Nanaimo (BC)		100+	Maffeo Sutton Park - Nanaimo Entertainment Centre
Canada		Nelson (BC)		100+	City of Nelson courtyard - Vernon Street to Hendryx, onto Baker Street
Canada		Niagara-on-the-Lake (ON)		30	Simcoe Park, 169 King St
Canada		North Bay (ON)		50+	Amelia Rising Sexual Violence Support Centre
Canada		Ottawa (ON)		1,000+	People rallied at Parliament Hill in frigid cold, then marched down Bank Street to Lansdowne Park. City Councillor Theresa Kavanagh, Ottawa council's first liaison for women and gender issues, proclaimed January 19th Women's March Day in Ottawa.
Canada		Owen Sound (ON)		60	Owen Sound & North Grey Union Public Library
Canada		Prince George (BC)		30	Prince George Civic Centre, Canada Games Way
Canada		Regina (SK)		hundreds	YWCA Regina
Canada		St. Catherines (ON)		35	BME Church on Geneva St - Mahtay Care on St. Paul St
Canada		Saint John (NB)		hundreds	King's Square - Saint John City Market
Canada		Sandy Cove, Halifax (NS)		50	In the small fishing village of Sandy Cove, attendance exploded this year to 50, compared to just 15 two years ago
Canada		Sarnia (ON)		250	old Sears store at Lambton Mall
Canada		Saskatoon (SK)		100+	The Amphitheatre at River Landing; Saskatoon Mayor Charlie Clark spoke
Canada		Toronto (ON)		1,000+	Nathan Phillips Square - Queen's Park; 8 °F wind chill snow storm. At Women March On: Toronto, Black Lives Matter activist Sandy Hudson and Ontario sex-ed activist Rayne Fisher-Quann were among the speakers who called attention to the Ontario government's repeal of the modernized sex-ed curriculum and the recent announcement of changes to port-secondary tuition and grants
Canada		Vancouver (BC)		hundreds	Vancouver Art Gallery - BC Supreme Courthouse
Canada		Victoria (BC)		hundreds	British Columbia Parliament Buildings
Canada		Waterloo/Kitchener (ON)		100	Waterloo Region Women's March; Waterloo Public Square - Kitchener City Hall
Canada		Winnipeg (MB)		50	Mantioba Legislative Building; dozens turned out to protest during extreme cold warning (-28 °C)
Chile	Mar. 8	Concepción		8,000	Barros Arana - Plaza de la Independencia (1,000-2,000 initially expected)
Chile	Mar. 8	Santiago		190,000+	The march called by the Coordinadora 8M gathered more than 300,000 people in Santiago and 800,000 at national level, according to the organizers, while the Government estimated 190,000 demonstrators in the capital alone. The mobilization took practically the entire Alameda main street, beginning after 6:30 p.m. in Plaza Baquedano, and ending in Echaurren Street.
Chile	Mar. 8	Talca		5,000	
Costa Rica		Nosara			
Denmark	Mar. 8	Copenhagen			Our Lady Square
Ecuador		Cuenca			Parque San Blas - Parque Calderon
Estonia		Tallinn		600	Viru Väravad (The first Women's March in Estonia)
France		Antibes			
France		Montpellier			Esplanade Charles de Gaulle
France	Jan. 20	Paris			The Paris Women's March, hosted by Democrats Abroad France, was held at Palais Royal Paris on Sunday, January 20. Ten weeks earlier, in November 2018, the yellow vests movement took off in France, marching across the streets of Paris and other French cities every Saturday in protest of President Emmanuel Macron's economic policies. By early January 2019, a women's contingent took place every following Sunday. Out of all the French cities in which the yellow vests were still active on the weekend of January 19–20 ("Act X"), only Paris and Montpellier were still independently involved with the global Women's March.
Germany		Berlin		2,000	Around 2,000 protesters marched from the Brandenburg Gate to the Alexanderplatz along the famous Unter den Linden. Organizers called for scrapping a Hitler-era law that makes it a crime for doctors to advertise that they perform abortions.
Germany		Düsseldorf		70	Bertha-von-Suttner-Platz
Germany		Frankfurt		1,200 - 1,300	Kaiserstrasse 81
Germany		Hamburg		hundreds	Rathaus Hamburg
Germany		Hanover		200	Kröpcke - New Town Hall
Germany		Heidelberg		400	Friedrich-Ebert-Platz - Heidelberg Town Hall
Germany		Munich		250+	Geschwister-Scholl-Platz - Marienplatz
Greece		Athens			Klafthmonos Square (changed from Syntagma Square). Women held placards declaring “Silent No More” next to a picture of Athena, the ancient Greek goddess of wisdom.
Ireland	Mar. 8	Dublin			March to be held on International Women's Day
Israel		Tel Aviv			Women's March Tel Aviv, held at Shradda Yoga Studio in Yafo
Italy		Florence			Piazza de San Lorenzo
Italy	Jan. 20	Milan		150	Piazza Castello - Piazza della Scala
Italy		Rome		hundreds	Piazza dei Santi Apostoli. Women met in a downtown square, where they took aim at Italy's populist government, which has been accused of whittling away measures that protect women and migrants.
Italy		Venice			Stazione di Venezia Santa Lucia
Japan	Jan. 20	Tokyo			Wesley Center, 2nd floor, Minamiaoyama 6-10-11
Mexico	Jan. 21	Puerto Vallarta			Hotel Rosita, Paseo Díaz Ordaz, Centro
Mexico	Jan. 20	Sonora			San Carlos Nuevo Guaymas
Netherlands	Mar. 9	Amsterdam		thousands	On Saturday March 9 (following International Women's Day), the second edition of the Women's March on Amsterdam began at Dam Square and ended at Museumplein. Around 3,500 people had signed up on Facebook; over 16,000 more signed up for a climate protest on Sunday, March 10.
Netherlands		Groningen		150	Waagplein 1–5; March Against Violence
New Zealand		Auckland		432	Britomart Place, Auckland Central: Women's Wave Aotearoa New Zealand
New Zealand	Jan. 20	Dunedin			
Nigeria		Abuja			Unity Fountain, Maitama
Norway		Bergen		100	Festplassen, Christies Gate
Norway	Jan. 12	Oslo			Skatten, Hagegata 22-24
South Africa		Johannesburg			
Spain		Barcelona			Carrer de Maspons
Spain		Madrid			event planned at Calle de la Ribera de Curtidores / Espacio Encuentro Feminista
Spain		Seville			March in Seville, Jarnies de Murillo (hosted by American Resistance Sevilla)
Sweden		Stockholm			Norrmalmstorg
Switzerland		Bern		500+	Over 500 people protested on Saturday afternoon in downtown Bern at an unauthorized rally against the World Economic Forum in Davos.
Switzerland		Geneva		100	
Switzerland		Lausanne		40	
Switzerland		Zürich		several hundred	Helvetiaplatz - city center. Zürich's Second Women's March was mixed with a demonstration against the WEF that started in Davos on Tuesday, Jan 15.
Taiwan		Taipei			No. 179-28, Jiaxing Street, Xinyi District
Thailand		Bangkok			
Uganda		Kampala			Hilltop Gardens, Naguru
United Kingdom		London		3,000	Bread & Roses March & Rally; BBC Broadcasting House - Trafalgar Square / Portland Place. Actress Evanna Lynch was present.
United Kingdom		Manchester			Manchester Albert Square; Women's Wave Manchester 2019
Zambia		Lusaka			Gymkhana Club / Manda Hill - Thabo Mbeki circle
Zimbabwe		Harare			
