= State Street Corporation =

Global financial services company

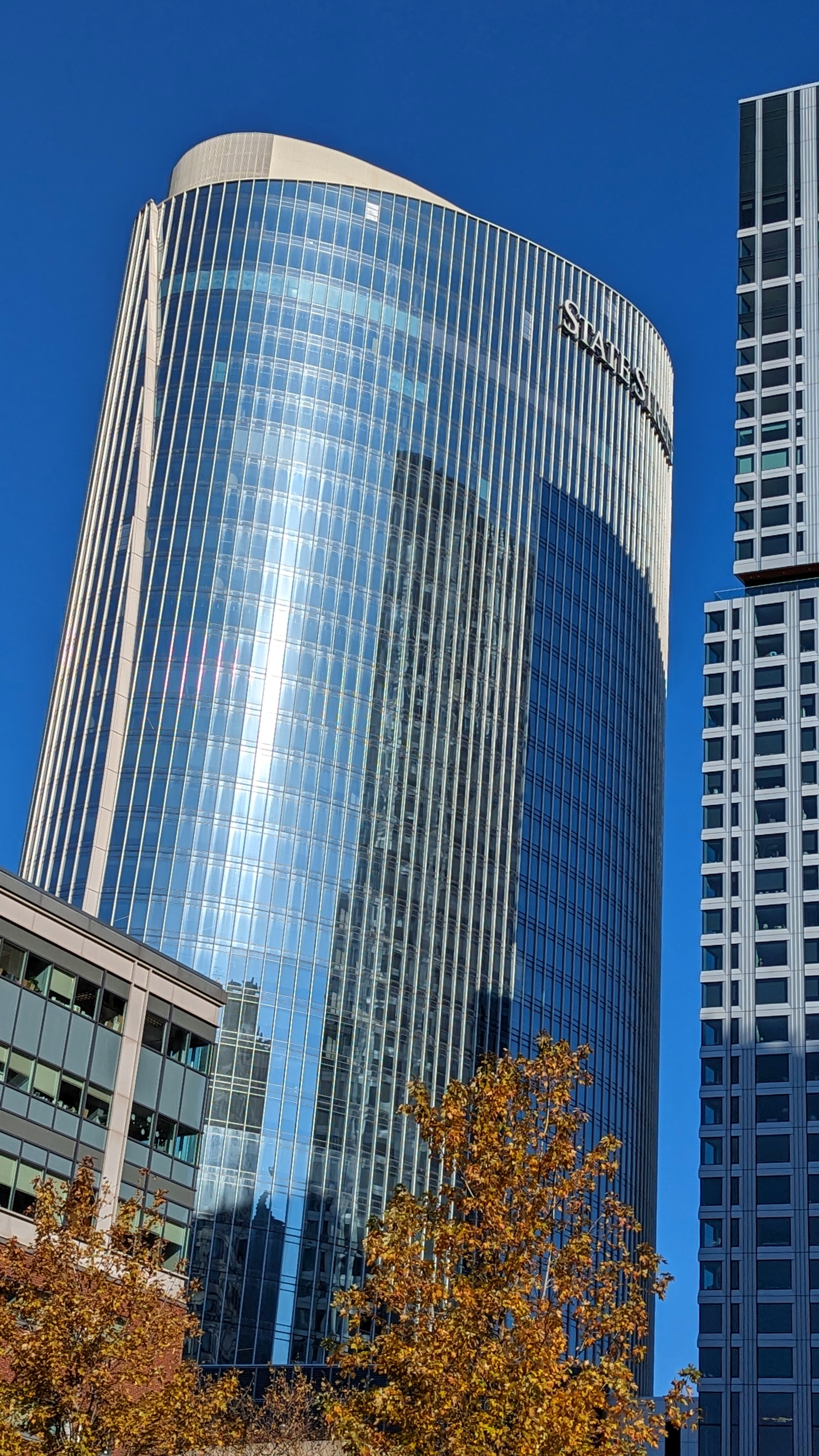
- One Congress Street, the headquarters of the company, in Boston
- Formerly: State Street Boston Financial Corporation (1960–1977); State Street Boston Corporation (1977–1997)
- Type: Public
- Traded as: NYSE: STT; S&P 500 component
- ISIN: US8574771031
- Industry: Financial services; Investment management
- Founded: June 25, 1792; 234 years ago (Union Bank)
- Headquarters: One Congress Street; Boston, Massachusetts, U.S.
- Key people: Ronald P. O’Hanley (chairman & CEO)
- Products: Asset management; Risk management; Mutual funds; Exchange-traded funds; Index funds
- Revenue: ▲US$13.9 billion (2025)
- Net income: ▲US$2.94 billion (2025)
- AUM: ▲US$4.715 trillion (2024)
- Total assets: ▲US$366 billion (2025)
- Total equity: ▲US$27.8 billion (2025)
- Number of employees: 52,626 (2024)
- Divisions: Investment Management; Global Services
- Subsidiaries: State Street Bank and Trust Company
- Website: www.statestreet.com

State Street Corporation is an American multinational financial services and bank holding company headquartered at One Congress Street in Boston. It is the second-oldest continuously operating U.S. bank, tracing its roots to Union Bank, chartered in 1792. As of the third quarter of 2025, State Street is one of the world's largest asset managers and custodians, with approximately US$5.4 trillion in assets under management and US$51.7 trillion under custody and administration.

State Street is ranked 198th on the Fortune 500, as of 2025. It operates globally through three main divisions: Global Services (custody and fund administration), Global Advisors (asset management), and Global Markets (trading and research). It is considered a systemically important bank by the Financial Stability Board and ranks among the "Big Three" index fund managers alongside BlackRock and Vanguard.

Among U.S. banks, it has the third most uninsured deposits, with 91.2% of deposits being uninsured.

== Current operations ==
=== Investment servicing: State Street Global Services ===
State Street Bank and Trust Company, also known as State Street Global Services, is the securities services division of State Street that provides asset owners and managers with securities services (e.g. custody, corporate actions), fund accounting (pricing and valuation), and administration (financial reporting, tax, compliance, and legal) services. Global Services handles assets from many classes, including stocks, derivatives, exchange-traded funds, fixed income assets, private equity, and real estate. Global Services also provides outsourcing for operations activities and handles US$10.2 trillion of middle-office assets.

=== Investment management: State Street Investment Management ===
State Street Investment Management is the investment management division of State Street that provides asset management, research, and advisory services to corporations, mutual funds, insurance companies, and other institutional investors. Global Advisors develops both passive management and active management strategies using both quantitative and fundamental approaches.

==== 1993 SPDR innovation ====
In 1993, the company created the SPDR S&P 500 Trust ETF, the first exchange-traded fund (ETF), and is now one of the largest ETF providers worldwide. Trading on SPDR began January 29, 1993.

=== State Street Global Markets ===
Global Markets is State Street's securities business that offers research, trading, and securities lending services for foreign exchange, equities, fixed income, and derivatives. To avoid conflict of interest, the company does not run proprietary trading books. Global Markets maintains trading desks in Boston, Hong Kong, London, Singapore, Sydney, Toronto, Tokyo and São Paulo.

== History ==
The company traces its roots to Union Bank, which received a charter in 1792 from Massachusetts Governor John Hancock. It was the third bank to be chartered in Boston and its office was at the corner of State and Exchange Streets.

In 1865, Union Bank received a national charter and became the National Union Bank of Boston. The bank later built a headquarters at Washington and State streets. The company is named after State Street in Boston, which was known as the "Great Street to the Sea" in the 18th century as Boston became a flourishing maritime capital. State Street Deposit & Trust Co opened in July 1891. The name was shortened to State Street Trust Company in 1897. It became the custodian of the first U.S. mutual fund in 1924, the Massachusetts Investors Trust (now MFS Investment Management).

=== 20th century ===
State Street and National Union Bank merged in October 1925. The merged bank took the State Street name, but National Union was the nominal survivor, and it operated under National Union's charter, thus giving the current entity its rank among the oldest banks in the United States. The company merged with Second National Bank in 1955 and with the Rockland-Atlas National Bank in 1961. In 1966, the company completed construction of the State Street Bank Building, a new headquarters building, the first high-rise office tower in downtown Boston.

In 1972, the company opened its first international office in Munich. In 1973, as a 50/50 joint venture with DST Systems, the company formed Boston Financial Data Services, a provider of shareholder record-keeping, intermediary and investor services, and regulatory compliance. More than 100 top staff from IBM were hired by State Street as it set about implementing IBM mainframe computer systems. In 1975, William Edgerly became president and chief executive officer of the bank and shifted the company's strategy from commercial banking to investments and securities processing. During the 1980s and 1990s, the company opened offices in Montreal, Toronto, Dublin, London, Paris, Dubai, Sydney, Wellington, Hong Kong, and Tokyo.

By 1992, most of State Street's revenue came from fees for holding securities, settling trades, keeping records, and performing accounting. In 1994, the company formed State Street Global Advisors, a global asset management business. In 1995, State Street acquired Investors Fiduciary Trust of Kansas City for $162 million from DST Systems and Kemper Financial Services. In 1996, Bank of New York acquired the unit investment trust servicing business of Investors Fiduciary Trust Co., Kansas City, Mo. In 1997, State Street set up its office in Singapore. In 1999, State Street sold its retail and commercial banking businesses to Citizens Financial Group.

=== 21st century ===
In 1990, State Street Bank Luxembourg was founded, and as of 2018 was the largest player in the country's fund industry by assets. In 2003, the company acquired the securities services division of Deutsche Bank for $1.5 billion. The company also sold its corporate trust business to U.S. Bancorp for $725 million. Also in 2003, State Street sold its private asset management business to U.S. Trust. In July 2007, the company acquired Investors Bank & Trust for $4.5 billion. In October 2008, the United States Department of the Treasury invested $2 billion in the company as part of the Troubled Asset Relief Program and in July 2009, the company became the first major financial firm to repay the Treasury.

In 2010, the company acquired Mourant International Finance Administration. It also acquired the securities services group of Intesa Sanpaolo for $1.87 billion. In December 2010, the company announced that it would be retrenching 5% of its workforce and effectively reducing the hourly wages of remaining employees by 10% via increased standard work hours. In November 2011, the company was named one of the world's 29 systemically important banks. In 2012, the company acquired Goldman Sachs Administration Services, a hedge fund administrator, for $550 million. In November 2014, the company sold SSARIS Advisors, its hedge fund unit, to senior management. In 2016, State Street launched a program called Beacon, focused on cutting costs and improving reporting technology. Their main focus was to shrink their US workforce in order to bolster profits in excess of $2.5 billion (2018 figures). Also in 2016, the company acquired the asset management business of General Electric. In 2017, the company announced that Jay Hooley, the chief executive officer of the company, would retire, to be succeeded by Ronald P. O’Hanley, then vice chairman, president and CEO of State Street Global Advisors.

In 2018, State Street completed its acquisition of Charles River Development, a Burlington, Massachusetts provider of investment management software. The deal closed October 1, 2018, at a cost of approximately $2.6 billion that will be financed by the suspension of share repurchases and the issuing of common and preferred equity. News of the acquisition led to a drop in State Street shares of nearly 10% with share prices remaining flat since the purchase.

In January 2019, State Street announced that it planned to lay off 1,500 employees, increasing the number to 2,300 in July. During that period, the company shifted their workforce from the United States to countries like China, India and Poland and operated under a hiring freeze. Increased overseas hiring resulted in a net gain of employment of over 3,000.

In September 2021, State Street agreed to buy Brown Brothers Harriman & Co.'s investor-services business for $3.5 billion in cash. Following continued scrutiny in receiving regulatory approvals, the deal was mutually agreed to be dropped in November 2022.

In February 2025, State Street agreed to acquire Mizuho Financial Group's global custody and related business outside of Japan. This covered approximately US $580 billion in assets under custody and US $24 billion under administration. The transaction is expected to close in late 2025. In late 2025, State Street officially opened a Middle East & North Africa Regional Headquarters (RHQ) in Riyadh, Saudi Arabia. In addition, on November 10, 2025, the company signed a cooperation agreement with Albilad Capital to support securities services in Saudi Arabia.

== Controversies ==
=== Allegations of currency trade fraud ===
In 2009, California alleged on behalf of its pension funds CalPERS and CalSTRS that State Street had committed fraud on currency trades handled by the custodian bank.

=== Non-disclosure of short position ===
On February 28, 2012, State Street Global Advisors entered into a consent order with the Massachusetts Securities Division. The Division was investigating the firm's role as the investment manager of a $1.65 billion (USD) hybrid collateralized debt obligation. The investigation resulted in a fine of $5 million (USD) for the non-disclosure of certain initial investors taking a short position on portions of the CDO.

=== Undisclosed commissions ===
On January 18, 2017, State Street agreed to pay $64.6 million to resolve U.S. investigations into what prosecutors said was a scheme to defraud six clients through secret commissions on billions of dollars of trades.

=== Fearless Girl statue ===
In March 2017, State Street Global Advisors commissioned a statue called Fearless Girl by Kristen Visbal and placed it temporarily in the Financial District, Manhattan, in front of the Wall Street icon Charging Bull. The statue is an advertisement for an index fund which comprises gender diverse companies that have a higher percentage of women among their senior leadership. While some have seen it as an encouragement of women in business, some women criticized the statue as "corporate feminism" that violated their own feminist principles. In October 2017, the company paid $5 million to settle a lawsuit charging that it had paid certain female and black executives less than their male and white peers.

=== Climate change ===
State Street announced in January 2020 that State Street Global Advisors will vote against directors of companies in major stock indices that do not meet targets for environmental, social, and governance changes. According to Morningstar Proxy Data, State Street, "supported a majority of the climate-related disclosure requests that shareholders placed on the ballot," during the 2020 proxy season.

=== Investments in China ===
In February 2025, a group of 17 U.S. state attorneys general criticized State Street for making improper or inadequate disclosures about investments in China.

== Financials ==
Financials in billions of US$
Year	2000	2001	2002	2003	2004	2005	2006	2007	2008	2009	2010	2011	2012	2013	2014	2015	2016	2017	2018
Revenue	3.577	3.827	4.396	4.734	4.951	5.473	6.311	8.336	10.69	8.640	8.953	9.594	9.649	9.884	10.30	10.36	10.21	11.17	11.98
Net income	0.595	0.628	1.015	0.722	0.798	0.838	1.106	1.261	1.811	−1.881	1.556	1.920	2.061	2.136	2.037	1.980	2.143	2.177	2.599
Assets	69.30	69.85	85.79	87.53	94.04	97.97	107.4	142.5	173.6	157.9	160.5	216.8	222.6	243.3	274.1	245.2	242.7	238.4	244.6
Assets under management	420	667	800	1,000	1,150	1,320	1,610	1,705	1,650	1,830	2,000	2,159	2,190	2,215	2,230	2,245	2,468	2,782	2,511
Headcount thousands	17.6	19.75	19.5	19.85	19.67	20.97	21.7	27.11	28.48	27.31	28.67	29.74	29.65	29.43	29.97	32.36	33.78	36.64	40.14

== See also ==
- State Street Bank & Trust Co. v. Signature Financial Group, Inc. is a case in which the United States Court of Appeals for the Federal Circuit ruled on July 23, 1998, that a computer algorithm can be patented to the extent that it produces "a useful, concrete and tangible result".
