= STIF =

STIF or Stif may refer to:

- Short-term investment fund, a type of low-risk investment fund, typically used by investors to park funds temporarily.
- Stif, another name for the city of Sétif, the capital of Sétif Province in northeastern Algeria.
- Sydney Turpentine-Ironbark Forest, a critically endangered ecological community of indigenous plants unique to parts of the Sydney Basin bioregion, New South Wales, Australia.
- Syndicat des transports d'Île-de-France, the former name of the organizing public transport authority for Paris and the surrounding Île-de-France region.
