= State Street Bank and Trust Company =

Custodian bank

- Type: Subsidiary
- Industry: Securities services
- Headquarters: One Congress Street; Boston, Massachusetts, U.S.
- Parent: State Street Corporation
- Subsidiaries: State Street Global Advisors Trust Company

State Street Bank and Trust Company (SSBT), commonly known as State Street Global Services, is a subsidiary of State Street Corporation organized as a trust company based in Massachusetts. The company is the largest custodian bank in the world and specializes in providing institutional investors, such as mutual funds, with clearing, settlement and payment services.

== History ==
SSBT used to provide retail banking and commercial lending products until it sold off the division in 1999 to Citizens Financial Group, of Providence, Rhode Island. The retail banking and commercial lending units were sold for $350 million.

== Operations ==
SSBT is the largest custodian bank in the world with US$36.74 trillion of assets under custody and administration as of the end of 2022. The company provides securities services such as clearing, settlement and payment services to entities such as institutional investors. Other services provided include custody, accounting, financial reporting, investor services, analytics, transaction management, recordkeeping, brokerage, and loans financing.

SSBT is the parent company of State Street Global Advisors Trust Company, the operating company of State Street Global Advisors (SSGA), a leading registered investment advisor. The State Street Global Advisors Trust Company serves as an trustee for SSGA's US unregistered collective and common trust funds, some SSGA sponsored ETFs including the SPDR S&P 500 ETF Trust, and separately managed accounts. As a whole, SSBT is the principal operating company within its parent company State Street Corporation.

== Historical data ==
State Street Bank and Trust Company was the tenth largest bank at the end of 2008 as an individual bank (not including subsidiaries).

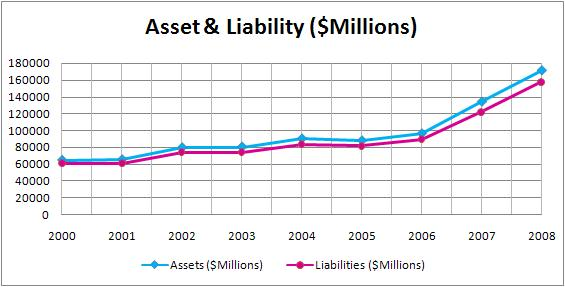
Asset & liability

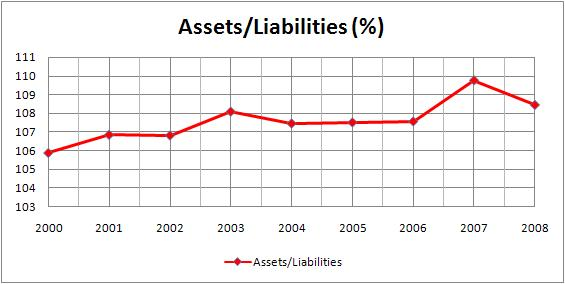
Asset/Liability ratio

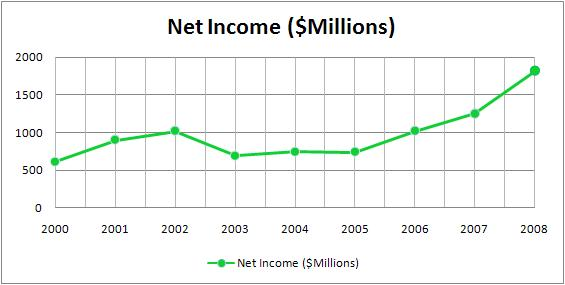
Net income

== See also ==
- State Street Bank v. Signature Financial Group (1998 U.S. patent law decision)
