= Goddess of the Sea (Visbal) =

Sculpture in Myrtle Beach, South Carolina, U.S.

- Artist: Kristen Visbal
- Year: 2018
- Medium: Bronze sculpture
- Location: Myrtle Beach, South Carolina, United States
- 33.693481°N 78.877806°W

Goddess of the Sea is a sculpture by Kristen Visbal, installed in Plyler Park, Myrtle Beach, South Carolina, United States on April 18, 2018. The bronze sculpture depicts a mermaid and two dolphins in water.

== See also ==
- Mermaids in popular culture
