= Jerry Hanlon =

American football coach (1929–2026)

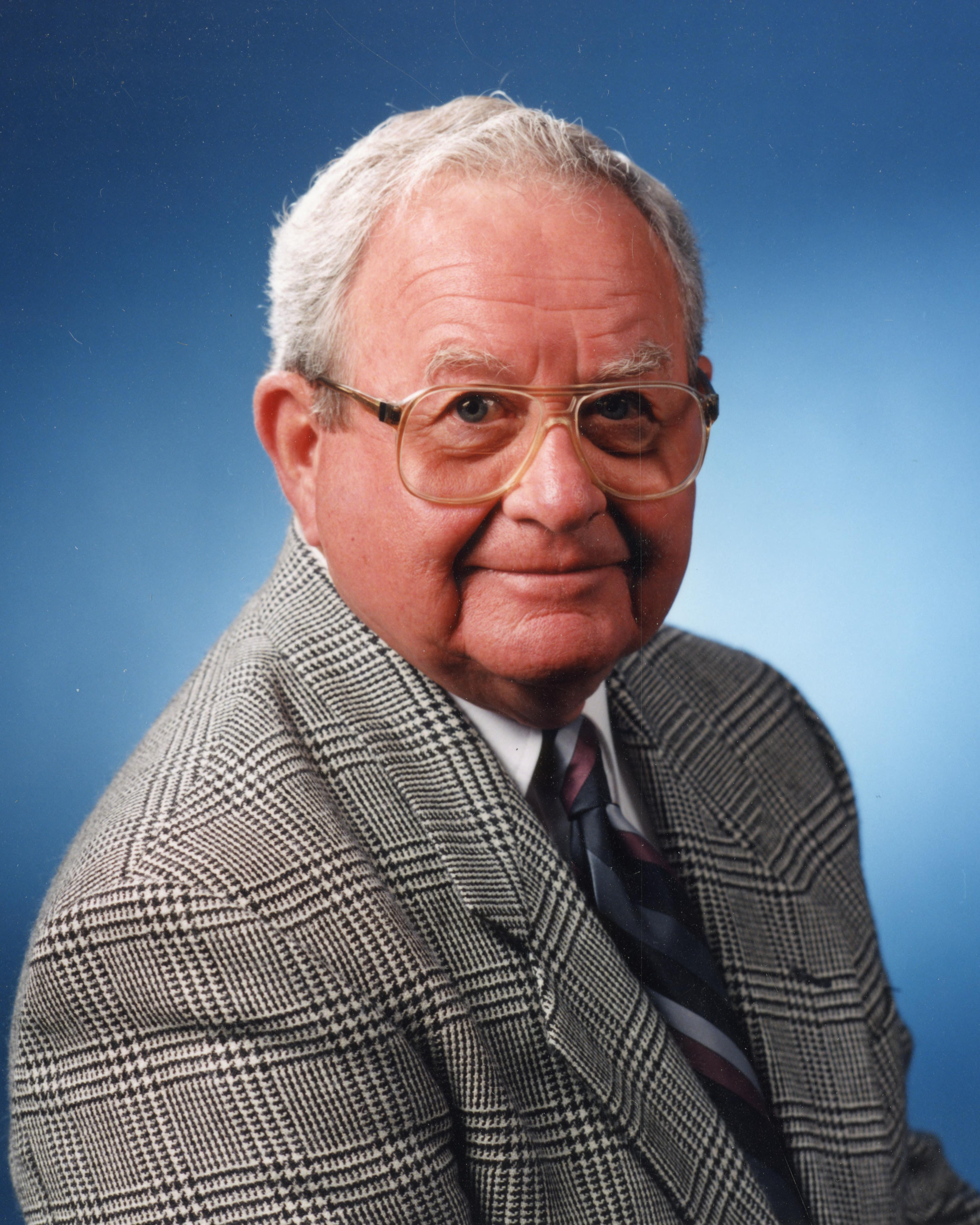
- Hanlon c. 1995

Biographical details
- Born: July 13, 1929
- Died: March 22, 2026 (aged 96)

Playing career
- 1953–1955: Miami (OH)
- Position: Halfback

Coaching career (HC unless noted)
- 1957–1960: Central Catholic HS (OH) (asst)
- 1961–1963: Ursuline HS (OH)
- 1964: St. Edward HS (OH)
- 1965: Dayton (assistant)
- 1966–1968: Miami (OH) (assistant)
- 1969–1991: Michigan (assistant)

Jerry Hanlon (July 13, 1929 – March 22, 2026) was an American football player, coach, and radio broadcaster. He was a halfback on the 1953–1955 Miami University teams that won two Mid-American Conference championships under Ara Parseghian. Hanlon was an assistant football coach at the University of Dayton (1965), Miami University (1966–1968), and the University of Michigan (1969–1991). He was also an announcer for Michigan Wolverines football games on WJR radio from 1993 through 1995.

== Life and career ==
=== Early years ===
Hanlon attended Taylor High School in North Bend, Ohio, where he played basketball and football. He later attended Xavier University and Miami University. At Miami, he played football for Ara Parseghian. He played halfback on the 1953–1955 Miami teams that won two Mid-American Conference championships under Paraseghian.

He graduated from Miami in 1956 and began a career in coaching. He was an assistant football coach under John McVay at Central Catholic High School in Canton, Ohio for four years from 1957 to 1960. He was also the head basketball coach at Catholic Central in 1960. From 1961 to 1963, he was the head coach at Ursuline High School in Youngstown, Ohio. In 1961, Hanlon's first season as a head coach, his team started out with three losses and then won six straight. Hanlon compiled a 19–5–3 record in three years at Ursuline and won the Youngstown city championship in 1963. In 1964, he was the head coach at St. Edward High School in Lakewood, Ohio.

=== Dayton and Miami ===
In 1965, Hanlon was the defensive backfield coach at the University of Dayton on a coaching staff that included head coach John McVay and assistants Joe Eaglowski, Tom Moore, George Perles, and Ed Youngs.

In 1966, Hanlon accepted a position on Bo Schembechler's coaching staff at Hanlon's alma mater, Miami. Hanlon served as an assistant coach under Schembechler for three years at Miami.

=== University of Michigan ===
When Schembechler accepted the head coaching position at the University of Michigan in 1969, Hanlon was one of several assistant coaches from Miami to follow Schembechler to Ann Arbor. He joined the Michigan football staff in 1969 and was the only assistant coach to serve on Michigan's staff during all 21 years that Schembechler was head coach. Hanlon was the team's offensive line coach for 17 years (1969–1981, 1988–1991) and the quarterback coach for six years (1982–1987). He was credited with developing 19 All-American offensive linemen at Michigan, including Dan Dierdorf, Reggie McKenzie, Jumbo Elliott and Greg Skrepenak.

In 1992, Hanlon retired from coaching, announcing that he wished to spend more time with his family. At the time of his retirement from coaching, Hanlon was appointed as the University of Michigan's assistant director of development and alumni relations. Hanlon also served as the color commentator on WJR's radio broadcasts of University of Michigan football games during the 1993, 1994 and 1995 seasons.

=== Later years ===
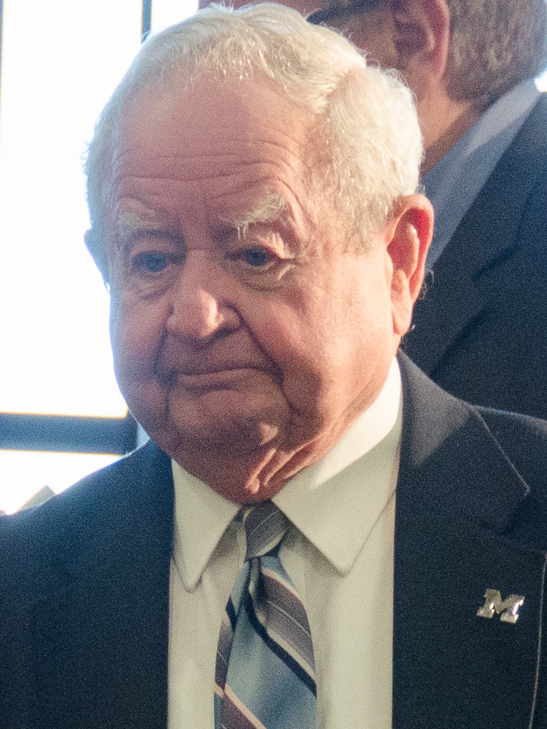
Hanlon in 2014

In 1997, Hanlon was inducted into the "Cradle of Coaches" Association.

Hanlon maintained a close friendship with Schembechler after the two retired from coaching. Detroit Free Press columnist Mitch Albom wrote that Hanlon was with Schembechler when Bo spoke to the Michigan football team shortly before he died in 2006. Albom wrote about the relationship between the two coaches:

"Hanlon was one of the assistants who came from Miami (Ohio) when Bo was hired to take over the Wolverines. He was beside Bo every game of the coach's tenure in Ann Arbor. Like other members of Bo's universe, it seems he has, over the years, come to walk like Bo, even look like Bo. Two days ago, he dropped by Schembechler's office and chatted. Then he went with him to the locker room for Bo's last address to the team. It would turn out to be the last time he saw him. 'Bo told me he was having trouble breathing,' Hanlon said. 'But he was going anyhow. In the locker room, Lloyd asked him if he wanted a stool. He said 'Hell, no, I don't want any stool.' ' Hanlon said Bo's address was moving and inspiring and all about the team."

As of 2005, Hanlon was living in Ann Arbor. He told a reporter at the time, "I still live in the same house I moved into in 1969. I couldn't afford to move in, and now I can't afford to move out."

Hanlon died on March 22, 2026, at the age of 96.
