= Cradle of Coaches =

Nickname for Miami University

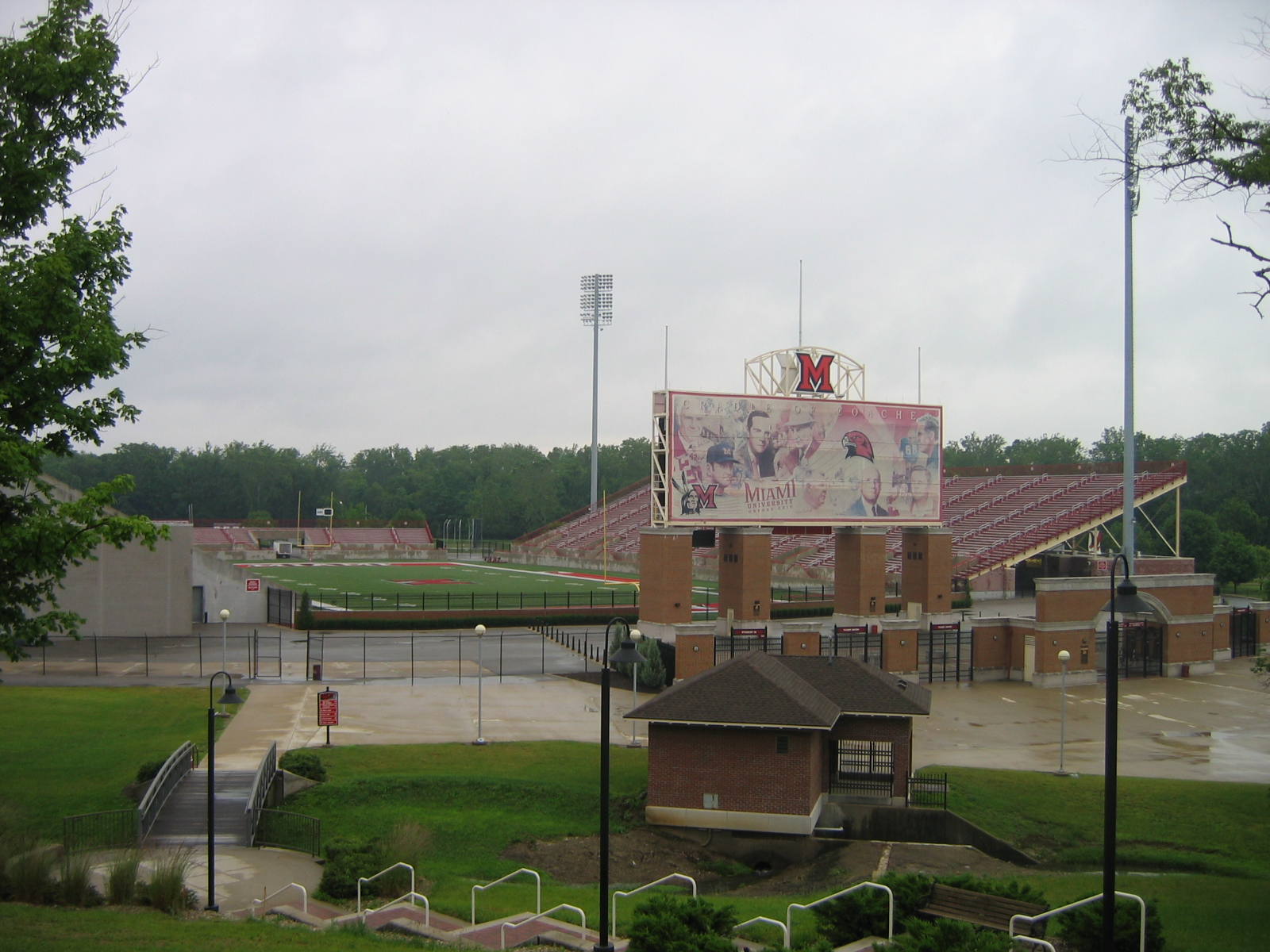
The Cradle of Coaches plaza at Yager Stadium

The Cradle of Coaches is a nickname given to Miami University in Oxford, Ohio, for its history of producing successful sports coaches, especially in football. Bob Kurz, a former Miami sports communications worker, popularized the term in a 1983 book, though the school's association with the nickname goes as far back as the early 1960s. The university inducts former coaches into the Cradle of Coaching Association for their feats as alumni.

== Notable coaches ==
The program's largest cohort are football coaches Earl Blaik, Paul Brown, Woody Hayes, Bill Arnsparger, George Little, Weeb Ewbank, Sid Gillman, Ara Parseghian, Bo Schembechler, John Pont, Carmen Cozza, Bill Mallory, Joe Novak, Ron Zook, Dick Crum, Paul Dietzel, Bill Narduzzi, Randy Walker, John Harbaugh, Nobby Wirkowski, Gary Moeller, Larry Smith, Dick Tomey, Terry Hoeppner, and Sean McVay.

Sean McVay coached the Los Angeles Rams to the World Championship on February 13, 2022, a 23-20 win over the Cincinnati Bengals in Super Bowl LVI. John Harbaugh coached the Baltimore Ravens to the World Championship on February 3, 2013, a 34-31 win over the San Francisco 49ers in Super Bowl XLVII. Weeb Ewbank coached the New York Jets to the World Championship on January 12, 1969, a 16-7 win over the Baltimore Colts in Super Bowl III.

Miami has also produced notable basketball coaches Darrell Hedric, Randy Ayers, Herb Sendek, Thad Matta and Sean Miller. Hedric, currently a scout for the Toronto Raptors, is an Ohio and Cincinnati Basketball Hall of Famer and holds the record for Miami victories. Ayers was a four-year starter for Miami, leading the team to back-to-back NCAA appearances in 1977 and 1978, and later served as a head coach for Ohio State and assistant coach in the National Basketball Association. Sendek began his head coaching career at Miami and led the RedHawks to the postseason in each of his three seasons. Matta, formerly the head coach at Ohio State, was an assistant under Sendek for one memorable year that included a regular-season MAC championship and NCAA tournament appearance, and also for one year under then-head coach Charlie Coles. University of Tennessee basketball coach Ray Mears is also a graduate of Miami. Baseball Hall of Fame manager Walter Alston is also a graduate of Miami. Additionally, hockey coach George Gwozdecky served as head coach at Miami prior to leaving for Denver, where he won two national championships.

== History ==
In the fall of 1959, Bob Kurz, Sports Information Director and a recent graduate (1958), recounted that several Miami graduates were making history on the football field. Louisiana State University under Paul Dietzel (1948) was listed as number 1 in the country. Northwestern University under Ara Parseghian (1948) was number 2; Earl Blaik (1918) was leading Army to an undefeated season, while in professional football Paul Brown (1930) was guiding the Cleveland Browns, and Weeb Ewbank (1928) was leading the Baltimore Colts. Both pro teams were on top of their divisions. Kurz coined the Cradle of Coaches term as a derivative from another nickname of Miami University, the Mother of Fraternities.

The Cradle of Coaches was the subject of a sports documentary film that aired on Time Warner Cable SportsChannel (Ohio) in 2015. The film captured the story of John Harbaugh's induction as well as perspective from other members.

== Cradle of Coaches Association inductees ==
Induction year	Name	Sport (current coaching position)	Miami class of
1992	Weeb Ewbank	Football	1928
1992	Bob Kurz	Football	1958
1992	Bill Narduzzi	Football	1959
1992	John Pont	Football	1952
1993	Paul Brown	Football	1930
1993	Mel Knowlton	Football	1937
1993	Ara Parseghian	Football	1949
1994	Bill Arnsparger	Football	1950
1994	Paul Dietzel	Football	1948
1994	Jack Llewellyn	Football	
1995	Jack Faulkner	Football	
1995	Joe Codiano	Football	
1995	Bill Mallory	Football	1957
1996	John Brickels	Football	
1996	Hal Paul		
1996	Dick Shrider	Basketball	
1997	Jerry Hanlon	Football	1956
1997	John McVay	Football	
1997	Frank Shands		
1998	Carmen Cozza	Football, baseball	1952
1998	Marvin Moorehead		
1998	Ernie Plank	Football	1950
2001	Dick Crum	Football	
2001	Darrell Hedric	Basketball	1955
2001	Lou Kaczmarek	Football	1950
2001	Rich Voiers	Basketball	1957
2001	Walter Alston	Baseball	1935
2001	Earl Blaik	Football	1918
2001	Leann Davidge	Tennis	
2001	Woody Hayes	Football	
2001	Raymond Ray		
2001	George Rider	Football, baseball, basketball, track, cross country	
2001	William Rohr	Basketball	
2002	Peggy Bradley-Doppes	Volleyball (UNC Wilmington Director of Athletics)	
2002	Denny Marcin	Football (New York Jets)	1964
2002	Nick Mourouzis	Football (DePauw)	1959
2002	Jim Rose	Basketball	1951
2002	Marvin McCollum	Basketball	1948
2002	Ron Zook	Football	1976
2004	Rodger Cromer		
2004	Carol Clark Johnson		
2004	Clarence McDade		
2004	Ron Niekamp	Basketball (Findlay)	1972
2004	Bo Schembechler	Football	1951
2006	George Dales		
2006	George Gwozdecky	Ice Hockey (University of Denver)	
2006	Danny Hall	Baseball (Georgia Tech)	
2006	Bob Kappes		
2006	Stephen Strome		
2006	Randall Whitehead		
2008	Terry Hoeppner	Football	
2008	Randy Walker	Football	
2011	Jerry Angelo	Football	1971
2011	Elaine Hieber		
2011	Dave Jennings	Swimming	
2011	Rob Patrick		
2011	Gary Quisno		
2011	Pam Wettig		
2014	John Harbaugh	Football (New York Giants)	1984
2016	Todd Spohn	Diving	1986
2017	Sean McVay	Football (Los Angeles Rams)	2008

Super Bowl-winning former head coach John Harbaugh was inducted in their Hall of Fame in 2014.

== The Cradle of Coaches sculpture group ==
A sculptural group called The Cradle of Coaches, by sculptor Kristen Visbal, was erected at Miami University between 2009 and 2011, with additions in 2014 and 2023. It consists of ten 120% lifesize statues of Earl Blaik, Paul Brown, Carm Cozza, Paul Dietzel, Weeb Ewbank, John Harbaugh, Ara Parseghian, John Pont, Bo Schembechler, Thomas Van Voorhis, and Sean McVay.

== See also ==
- List of Miami University people
- Miami RedHawks
