= Investors Bank & Trust =

Investors Financial Services Co.
- Company type: former: Public
- Traded as: former: Nasdaq: IFIN
- Industry: Financial services
- Founded: 1969 in Boston, Massachusetts
- Defunct: 2007
- Fate: Acquired
- Successor: State Street Corporation
- Headquarters: Boston, Massachusetts, United States
- Key people: Kevin Sheehan, CEO & Chairman; John Spinney, SVP & CFO
- Products: Custodian bank
- Revenue: ▲$1.95 trillion assets under custody, $277 billion non-U.S. assets under custody USD (2005)
- Number of employees: 3,250 (2007)
- Website: www.ibtco.com (defunct)

Investors Bank & Trust (IBT) was an American custodian bank, and the principal operating subsidiary of Investors Financial Services Corp., a holding company based in Boston, Massachusetts. First founded in 1969 as an offshoot of Eaton Vance, the company was purchased by State Street Corporation in 2007 as an all-stock deal valued at nearly $4.5 billion and no longer operates as a separate listed company. State Street refers informally to the former IBT operation as "State Street Back Bay".

IBT's headquarters were located within the landmark John Hancock Tower designed by I.M. Pei, where it was chief tenant. Some of IBT's more well-known clients included Aegon, Barclays Global Investors, Eaton Vance, and MassMutual.

== Office locations ==
Investors Financial Services had offices in Massachusetts, New York City, Sacramento, Toronto, Dublin, and Grand Cayman Island. The New York office had only 10 people, while the Grand Cayman Island office was only a post office address held for tax reasons.

== Holdings ==
- Investors Bank & Trust
- Merrimac Money Market Funds
