= Short-term investment fund =

Type of Investment Fund

A short-term investment fund (STIF) is a type of investment fund which invests in money market investments of high quality and low risk. They are commonly used by investors to temporarily store funds while arranging for their transfer to another investment vehicle that will provide higher returns.

This type of fund aims to protect capital while generating a return that compares favourably with a particular benchmark, such as a Treasury Bill index. These types of fund have low management fees (usually well beneath 1% p.a.) and relatively low rates of return, commensurate with their low-risk investment style.
