= Bulfinch Crossing =

Development project in Boston, Massachusetts

- One Congress
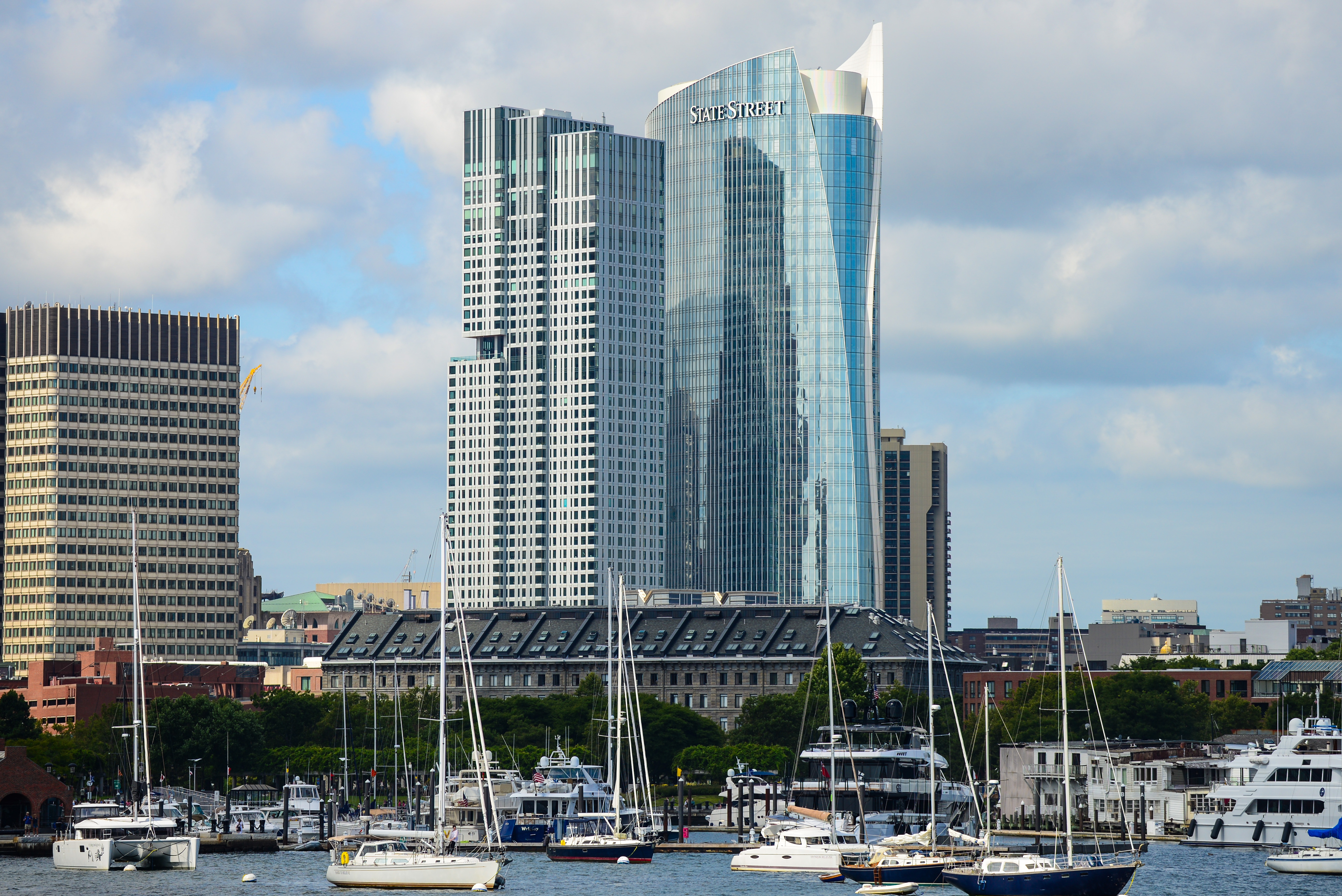

- Location within Boston

General information
- Status: Under construction
- Type: Office, retail
- Coordinates: 42°21′46″N 71°03′31″W
- Named for: Bulfinch Triangle
- Groundbreaking: Summer 2019
- Construction started: Late 2015
- Completed: 2023
- Opening: 2023

Height
- Roof: 520 ft (160 m)
- Top floor: 600 ft (180 m)

Technical details
- Floor count: 43
- Floor area: 1,012,000 sq ft (94,000 m^{2})

Design and construction
- Architect: César Pelli
- Architecture firm: Pelli Clarke Pelli
- Developer: HYM Investment Group
- Other designers: CBT Architects
- Main contractor: Tishman Construction

Other information
- Facilities: MBTA subway and bus station, Bluebikes dock, charging station, Zipcar, Maven, Enterprise Rent-A-Car
- Parking: 1,160 spaces

Website
- bulfinchcrossing.com www.onecongress.com

Bulfinch Crossing
- The Sudbury

General information
- Status: Completed
- Type: Residential, retail
- Named for: Bulfinch Triangle
- Groundbreaking: January 24, 2017
- Construction started: Late 2015
- Completed: 2020
- Opening: 2020

Height
- Roof: 519 ft (158 m)

Technical details
- Floor count: 45
- Floor area: 547,900 sq ft (50,900 m^{2})

Design and construction
- Architects: Pelli Clarke Pelli and CBT Architects
- Developer: HYM Investment Group
- Other designers: CBT Architects

Other information
- Number of rooms: 423 (residential), 200 (hotel)
- Facilities: MBTA subway and bus station, Bluebikes dock, charging station, Zipcar, Maven, Enterprise Rent-A-Car
- Parking: 1,160 spaces

Website
- bulfinchcrossing.com/buildings/residential_tower

Bulfinch Crossing (also known as the Government Center Garage Redevelopment) is a redevelopment project in Downtown Boston, Massachusetts, United States. It is planned to consist of two skyscrapers, a smaller residential tower, a low-rise office building, a hotel, and a low-rise retail building. Site preparation began in late 2015, and construction officially commenced on January 24, 2017, with four planned phases. Phases 1 and 2 are complete, Phase 3 is approved, and Phase 4 planning has not begun. Construction on the residential tower completed in 2020. The high-rise office tower, One Congress, commenced construction in 2019 and topped off in July 2021; after an announced plan to open in 2022, it officially opened in September 2023. However, as of April 2026, the rest of the site was still under construction, and the nearby Haymarket bus terminal was still closed, with the remaining project timeline unclear.

== One Congress ==
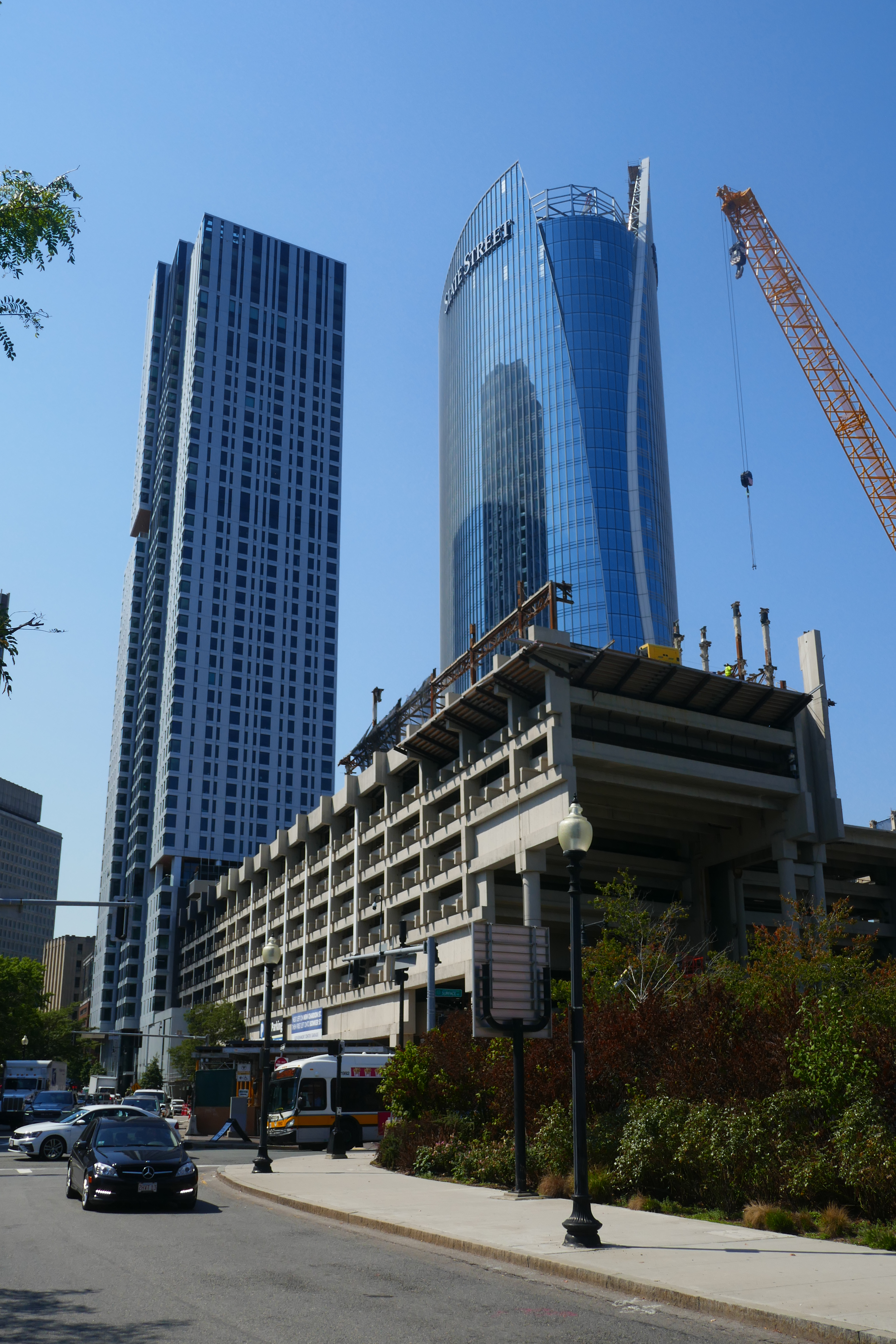
Towers under construction, 2022

The primary anchor of the Bulfinch Crossing development is One Congress, the 43-story office tower, which was completed in 2023 as the eighth-tallest building in Boston. It was designed by renowned firms Pelli Clarke & Partners and CBT Architects. The building features a three-story lobby and high-end amenities.

The first floor of the building contains the triple-height lobby and retail space, as well as a coffee bar, lounge area, and collaborative workspaces. The remaining floors, with the exception of the 11th floor amenity center contain offices, and with the average floor plate measuring 29,800 SF.

The 11th floor of the building is an amenity center for office customers. The amenities include a fitness center, rooftop garden, a 15,000 square foot outdoor terrace and several conference rooms and a conference facility. Parking is also available.

The building earned a platinum level of certification through the US Green Building Council's Leadership in Energy and Environmental Design certification program, and also has a 2-Star Fitwel certification.

In the summer of 2018, developers of One Congress & Bulfinch Crossing announced on Bulfinch Crossing's Twitter that construction on One Congress would begin in summer of 2019 and also announced that it will be opening in 2022. Ultimately, the building was finished in 2023. In January 2019, State Street Corporation was announced to be the anchor tenant in the new building, and in September 2023 they began operations from the location as their new global headquarters. Other tenants include InterSystems and K&L Gates.

== The Sudbury ==
The second largest building in the development is The Sudbury (sometimes called Residential Tower I by the developer), which was completed in 2020 at 519 ft (158 m) tall. It is Boston's 17th-tallest building.

The tower was originally planned to consist of 486 apartments, but now instead contains only 368 apartments and 55 condos. This change was announced in July 2017 when the developer decided to convert 118 apartments into 55 condos due to a slowing demand for luxury housing in Boston.

The residential tower contains a fitness center, swimming pool, rooftop garden, clubroom, private kitchen and diner, yoga room, golf simulator, pet spa, concierge services and a sky lounge and terrace. On-site parking is also available.

== Other buildings ==
Along with the two main towers of the development, four smaller buildings and a public square was constructed. Along with these buildings, there is nearly 4,132,500 sq ft (383,900 m^{2}) in the entire development.

=== Residential Tower II ===
A smaller residential tower (officially named Residential Tower II), is planned alongside the rest of the development. It will rise 299 feet (91 metres), with a total of 28 stories. The tower will be primarily residential, with 291 units. At least 8,400 sq ft (800 m^{2}) of the building will be designated for retail use.

=== Boutique Office ===
In addition to the main office tower, a smaller office building (officially named Boutique Office) is under construction; it is planned to contain at least 163,800 sq ft (15,200 m^{2}) of both office and retail space. The building will rise 152 feet (46 meters) and will contain 11 stories. It is planned to have a private terrace for office workers.

=== Retail building ===
A retail building (officially named Iconic Retail) is planned to be constructed as part of the development project; it is planned to be situated across the street from the Boston Public Market and will contain four floors. The building is intended to house a flagship store, and will include an entrance to the Haymarket Square subway station.

=== Hotel ===
A 157 ft (48 m) tall hotel building is being constructed at the northern edge of the site, and is planned to contain at least 200 hotel rooms. Although the main use for the building is a hotel, at least 57 condominiums and 17,400 sq ft (1,600 m^{2}) of retail space will be located inside the 14-story building.

==== Amenities ====
The hotel is planned to contain a ballroom, several meeting rooms, a rooftop bar, and a rooftop terrace.

== Parking garage ==
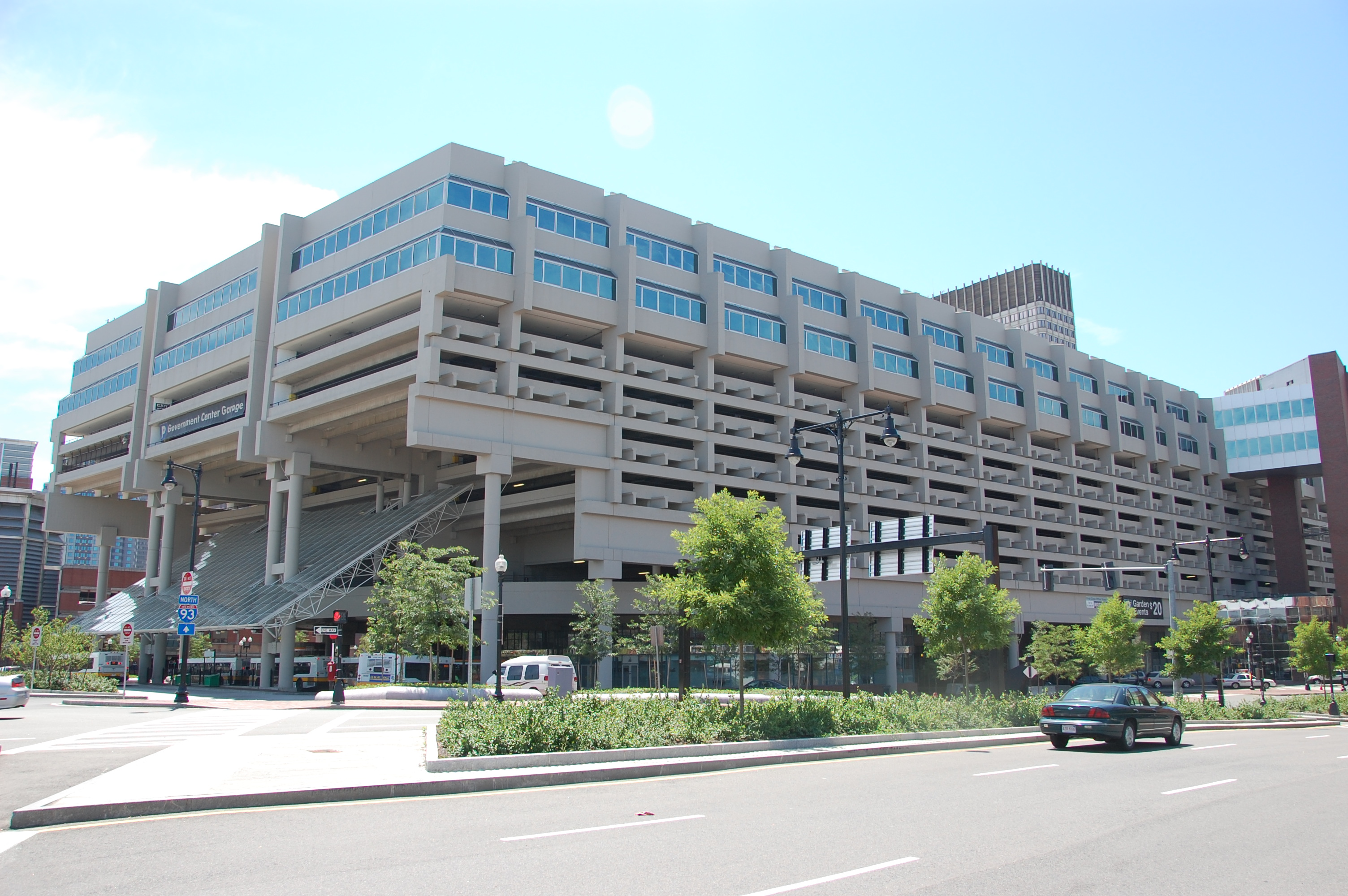
The Government Center garage was demolished to make way for the development.

In order to make room for the new development, demolition began on the existing Government Center garage. The garage was constructed in the 1960s as part of the Government Center urban renewal project; it contains 2,300 parking spaces. Due to the fact that the garage is entirely made out of concrete, it is considered to be an eyesore by many, along with the nearby City Hall building.

At least 1,160 parking spaces in the garage were to be preserved to accommodate the new development, and the spaces were to be placed inside of the new office tower.

== Construction accidents and delays ==
Part of the project included a proposed redevelopment of the Haymarket bus station, which has been closed since June 2021. On March 26, 2022 the Government Center garage partially collapsed during demolition work, causing the death of construction worker Peter Monsini and resulting in a four-month work stoppage. Later that year engineers realized nearby structural supports in the MBTA tunnels were damaged, possibly due to the collapse, leading to shutdowns of the Orange and Green Lines that run under the garage. Although the original plans projected the garage demolition should be complete by March 30, 2023 or at the latest December 1, 2024, as of April 2026 it was unclear whether the garage demolition was certified complete or whether work on the new bus terminal begun. However, the bulk of the demolition appeared to be done in December 2023.
