= Fearless Girl =

Statue by Kristen Visbal in New York City

- The statue in March 2017 (original location)
- Artist: Kristen Visbal
- Medium: Bronze sculpture
- Dimensions: 50 inches (130 cm) tall
- Weight: 250 pounds (110 kg)
- Location: New York City; 40.7067°N 74.0109°W
- Owner: State Street Global Advisors

Fearless Girl sculpture by Kristen Visbal (2017)

Fearless Girl is a bronze sculpture by Kristen Visbal of a 4-foot-high (1.2 m) girl standing in a self-confident pose. It is located in New York City on Broad Street across from the New York Stock Exchange Building in the Financial District of Manhattan.

Fearless Girl was commissioned by State Street Investment Management, formerly State Street Global Advisors (SSGA), a large asset management company, to promote gender diversity initiatives and an index fund focused on gender-diverse companies with a relatively high percentage of women in senior leadership. As of 2025, State Street quietly backed away from its commitment to diversity, and the statue's future remains uncertain.

The statue was first installed at the northern tip of Bowling Green on Broadway, facing the sculpture Charging Bull on March 7, 2017, in anticipation of International Women's Day on the following day. Following complaints from Charging Bull sculptor Arturo Di Modica, Fearless Girl was removed in November 2018 and relocated to its Broad Street location the following month. A plaque with footprints was placed on the original site of Fearless Girl.

== Description ==
Fearless Girl measures approximately 50 inches (130 cm) tall and weighs about 250 pounds (110 kg). When it was first installed, the sculpture faced Charging Bull, a much larger and heavier bronze statue that is 11 feet (3.4 m) tall and weighs 7,100 pounds (3,200 kg).

Fearless Girl was intended to "send a message" about workplace gender diversity and encourage companies to recruit women to their boards. The plaque below the statue stated: "Know the power of women in leadership. SHE makes a difference," with SHE referring to both the gender of the subject and the NYSE ticker symbol of a SSGA supported and gender diverse index fund.

The commission by State Street Global Advisors specified that the statue should depict a girl with hands on her hips and chin up, with a height of 36 inches, which Kristen Visbal and her collaborators then increased to 50 inches, to better match the size of Charging Bull. Still, Visbal commented that "I made sure to keep her features soft; she's not defiant, she's brave, proud, and strong, not belligerent". She modeled the sculpture on two children from Delaware "so everyone could relate to the Fearless Girl."

== History ==
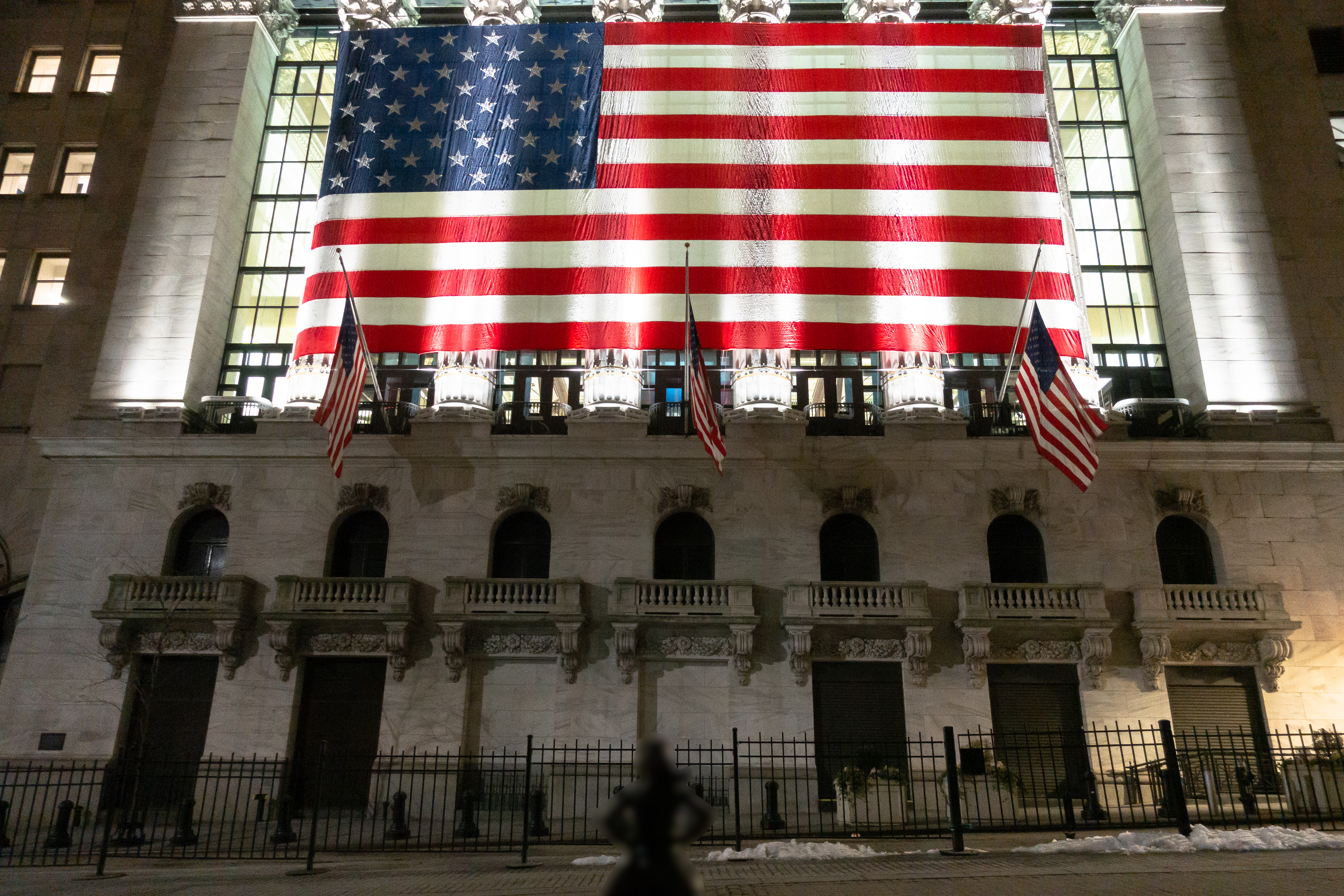
The statue (bottom) in its current location: facing the New York Stock Exchange Building

The statue was installed on March 7, 2017—the day before International Women's Day—by State Street Global Advisors, in a campaign developed by advertising agency McCann New York. SSGA was celebrating the first anniversary of its "Gender Diversity Index" fund that "invests in U.S. large-capitalization companies that rank among the highest in their sector in achieving gender diversity across senior leadership". The concept for the statue was developed by Senior Art Director Lizzie Wilson and Senior Copywriter Tali Gumbiner. Wilson and Gumbiner established both the idea for the statue as well as the overall look of the girl using countless moodboards and imagery, which Visbal referenced.

Fearless Girl was originally given a one-week City Hall permit that was later extended to 30 days. Later, it was announced that the statue would remain in place through February 2018. Among those advocating for the statue to stay longer was U.S. Representative Carolyn Maloney of New York's 12th congressional district, who stated, "This statue has touched hearts across the world with its symbolism of the resiliency of women." New York City Public Advocate Letitia James wrote a letter that supported keeping the statue, "Fearless Girl stands as a powerful beacon, showing women—young and old—that no dream is too big and no ceiling is too high".

A petition on Change.org asking for the statue to be made permanent gathered 2,500 signatures in its first 48 hours. Efforts to make the statue permanent continued after the statue was granted a one-year permit. In April 2018, after Fearless Girl had been in place for thirteen months, New York City Mayor Bill de Blasio announced that both Charging Bull and Fearless Girl would be moved to a location facing the New York Stock Exchange. The move would occur before the end of 2018.

The statue was removed from its original location at Bowling Green on November 28, 2018. On the spot where the statue stood was placed a marker which read, "Fearless Girl is on the move to the New York Stock Exchange. Until she's there, stand for her." The plaque has footprints where people can stand. The statue was unveiled on December 10 at its new site facing the New York Stock Exchange Building.

Before 2025, thanks to Fearless Girl, State Street Global Advisors were known as a symbol of gender diversity in the workplace, and required at least 30% of company boards to be females or those companies would not be featured in SSGA's index. Furthermore, SSGA required companies featured in their index to disclose the gender, racial and ethnic composition of their boards, and to state their goals for diversity, equity and inclusion as part of overall business strategy. As of April 2025, these requirements had been dropped by SSGA without any announcement. Reuters explicitly tied this to political pressure to slow the pace of adding board members that are not white men. Artnet News wrote that this action would increase the uncertainty of the statue's future.

=== Status ===
As of March 2025, the sculpture's presence still relies on a temporary permit. While the dispute over the rights to the figure is over, the statue's future is not permanently decided.

The Landmarks Preservation Commission met on December 14, 2021, and decided to renew its permit, but then handed over the decision to the Public Design Commission (PDC). In turn, the PDC granted an 11-month permit extension, but also charged SSGA and Visbal to reach an agreement on a permanent location. On June 20, 2023, the New York City Department of Transportation (DOT) applied for another 11-month extension. This was tabled, the PDC asking the DOT to return with a revised application involving a shorter extension timeframe in one month's time. As of April 2024, the permit had not been extended.

== Reactions ==
=== Juxtaposition with Charging Bull ===
Di Modica, who installed Charging Bull in 1989, asked that the statue of the girl be removed, arguing that the piece exploited his work for commercial purposes and altered the perception of the bull. He called Fearless Girl "an advertising trick" that he wanted relocated.

On April 12, 2017, Di Modica and his attorney, former New York Civil Liberties Union director Norman Siegel, challenged city officials who let the Fearless Girl statue be installed. Di Modica said that the statue corrupted Charging Bull's artistic integrity by distorting the intent of his statue from "a symbol of prosperity and for strength" into a villain, and does so for SSGA's commercial gain. Siegel said a lawsuit had not been filed as of yet. De Blasio supported keeping the statue, tweeting that "Men who don't like women taking up space are exactly why we need the Fearless Girl."

=== Criticism ===
State Street Global Advisors faced criticism that Fearless Girl was commissioned primarily to serve its own interests. The Guardian reported that the company had repeatedly voted against initiatives to advance gender equality and transparency in pay disparity, and paid $5 million to settle charges of pay discrimination involving about 300 female employees after an audit by the U.S. Department of Labor. Some women criticized the statue as "corporate feminism" that violated their own feminist principles. The New York Times columnist Ginia Bellafante called the sculpture commission "an exercise in corporate imaging" by State Street, which, she wrote, had entered into a deferred prosecution agreement with the United States Department of Justice, agreeing to pay more than $64 million to resolve fraud charges for secretly billing clients for unwarranted commissions. "Corporate feminism", she wrote, "operates with the singular goal of aiding and abetting a universe of mothers who tuck their daughters in at night whispering, 'Someday, honey, you can lead the emerging markets and sovereign debt team at Citigroup, and then become a director at Yahoo.'" Christine Emba, an opinion writer for The Washington Post, wrote that the statue "portrays the empowered woman as a child, reinforcing the idea of femaleness as cute and inoffensive—a child with potential, maybe, but not all the way there." Daniela Peluso, an anthropologist, suggested that restating outdated and conventional gender stereotypes (the brave little girl vs the big bad male bull) is belittling and that it is vital to be aware that "gender discrimination and the corporate side-lining of women assume more nuanced and insidious forms, which such simplistic images obscure."

=== Disputes over commercial rights ===
On February 14, 2019, State Street Global Advisors filed a lawsuit against Kristen Visbal, claiming that she had made and sold replicas of the statue in violation of her contract with the company. The suit claimed the artist made at least three unauthorized Fearless Girl reproductions that could damage the company's global campaign in support of female leadership and gender diversity. Court filings reported that replica Fearless Girl statues were selling for as much as $250,000. Specifically, while SSGA claimed to have commissioned the work, these claims were challenged in court filings in the lawsuit between SSGA and Visbal. There was also a dispute over what rights are held by the artist and State Street Global Advisors. In 2024, SSGA settled its lawsuit against Visbal.

On February 25, 2021, SSGA took Australian law firm Maurice Blackburn (MBL) to the Federal Court in Australia alleging that the Fearless Girl replica placed at Federation Square in Melbourne, Australia constituted copyright and trademark infringement. Justice Jonathan Beach ruled in MBL's favor, finding there was no violation of SSGA's trademark, since the replica's name "fearless girl" was used in a descriptive way. In other words, MBL was able to rely upon the defense of acting in good faith under s.122(1)(b)(i) of Trade Marks Act 1995. The copyright infringement claim under s.36 Copyright Act 1968 also failed as MBL was able to rely upon the defense of innocent infringement. Overall, this meant that MBL is able to display its Australian replica legally.

=== Other events ===
On May 29, 2017, artist Alex Gardega added a statue of a small dog, titled Peeing Pug, next to the Fearless Girl and removed it after approximately three hours.

Gothamist reported on March 20, 2017, that masked activists had covered the statue in "Make America Great Again" apparel and a US flag. They also placed pro-Donald Trump signs on it, including one reading "VETS B4 ILLEGALS" and another with a drawing of Pepe the Frog.

On October 6, 2017, State Street, the company that funded Fearless Girl, paid $5 million to settle a lawsuit from its female and minority employees who alleged the company violated equal pay rights.

The statue was given a lace collar in respect to longtime Supreme Court Justice Ruth Bader Ginsburg following her death in September 2020.

During the COVID-19 pandemic, the statue was frequently seen wearing a face mask.

In November 2022, the Oslo version of the statue was moved in front of the Iranian embassy in Drammensveien in support of women in Iran during the Mahsa Amini protests.

In January 2024, a protester dressed Fearless Girl in pro-Palestinian garb.

=== Effect of publicity ===
As reported by Bloomberg News, analysts from marketing firm Apex Marketing estimated that the statue resulted in $7.4 million in free publicity for SSGA as of April 2017, broken down into $201,075 worth of free radio coverage, $393,047 worth of free social media coverage, $3,115,751 worth of free TV coverage, and $3,729,926 worth of free online/print news coverage.

== Awards ==
- The Most Next Award, 2018 Association of Independent Commercial Producers (AICP) Next Awards
- Grand Effie – best in show, North American Effie Awards
- Fearless Girl won 18 Cannes Lions at the 2017 Cannes Lions International Festival of Creativity:
  - Titanium: Grand Prix
  - Outdoor: Grand Prix, one gold
  - PR: Grand Prix, one gold, one silver
  - Glass: Grand Prix
  - Promo and Activation: Two golds, one silver
  - Media: Two golds
  - Direct: Two golds, one silver, one bronze
  - Design: Two golds

Fearless Girl is one of only two campaigns that have ever won four Grand Prix at Cannes. It won in the Glass (which deals with marketing addressing gender inequality) and PR categories, and tying for first in the Outdoor category alongside a campaign by Twitter.

== Versions ==
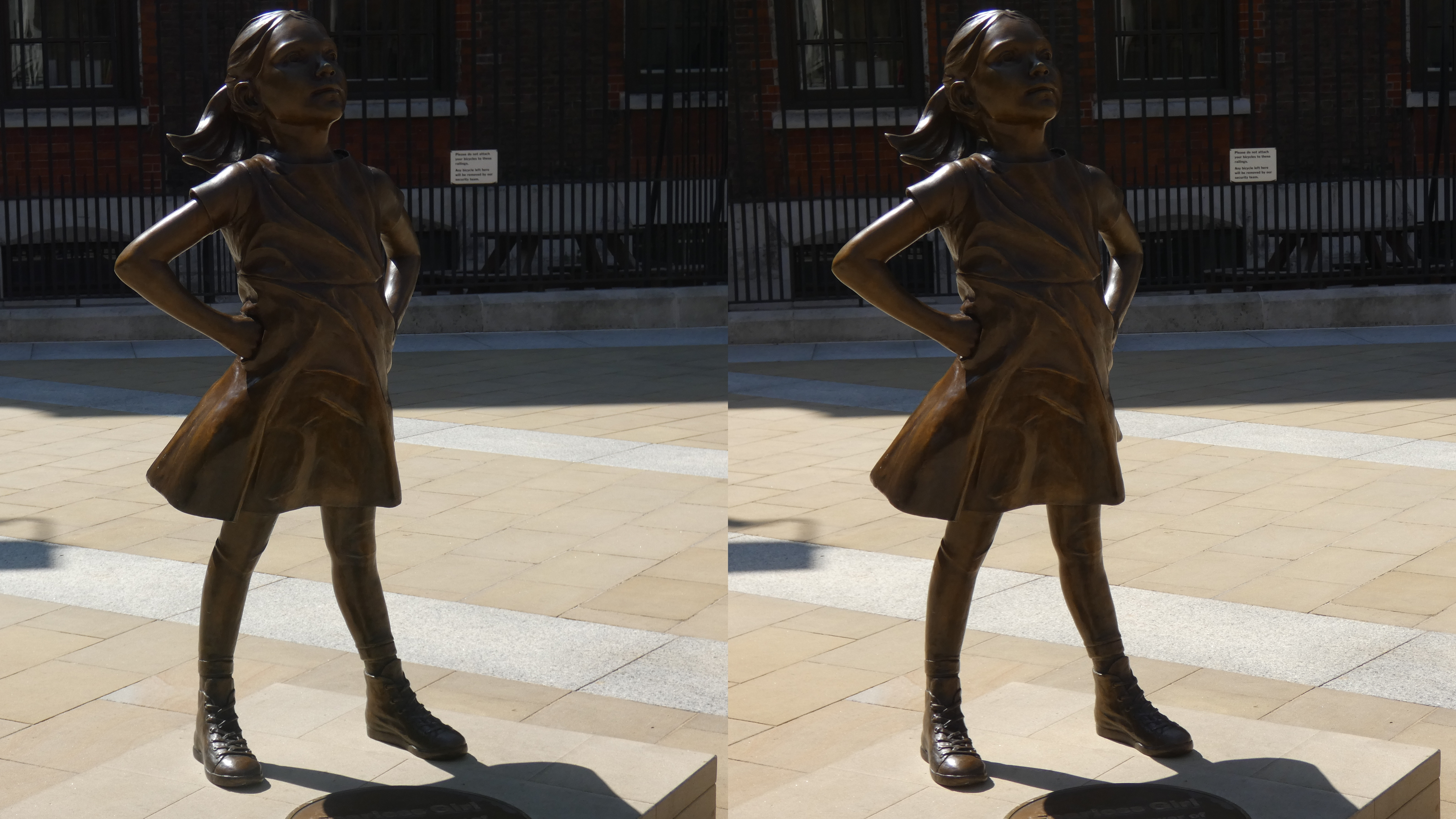
Fearless Girl at Paternoster Square in 3D

Visbal created Fearless Girl using the lost-wax casting process, which creates a mold for molten bronze that artists traditionally reuse to cast additional versions of an original design. In late 2017, State Street learned that another casting of Fearless Girl had been sold to a German company and raised concerns with Visbal that the sale or unveiling might violate one or more provisions of their contract. Those conversations led Visbal to delay the unveiling of the sculpture. Ultimately, that version of the sculpture was never placed and there was no unveiling.

Another casting of the sculpture was unveiled outside the Grand Hotel in the Norwegian city of Oslo on March 8, 2018, as a permanent addition. It faces the Norwegian parliament Stortinget.

Reports indicate another reproduction being installed in Johannesburg, South Africa in 2018, later moved to Cape Town. This is not a replica of Fearless Girl, but instead a piece inspired by Visbal's work called Fearless Thinker, created by local artist Marieke Prinsloo-Rowe.

A reproduction was revealed by Kristen Visbal at Federation Square in Melbourne, Australia, before Women's Day at March 8, 2019, planned to remain there for four years. This replica became the subject of a federal lawsuit, see #Disputes over commercial rights.

Other replica statues placed in March 2019 include one in Paternoster Square, near the London Stock Exchange and one near the West Hollywood Library in West Hollywood, California.

Also in March 2019, St. Timothy's School, a private boarding school for girls in Stevenson, MD, displayed a reproduction permanently placed on its campus.

== See also ==
- 2017 in art
- Day Without a Woman, a protest held on March 8, 2017
- Women in business
