= Kristen Visbal =

American sculptor

- Born: December 3, 1962 (age 63); Montevideo, Uruguay
- Education: Salisbury University
- Notable work: Fearless Girl

Kristen Visbal (born December 3, 1962) is an American sculptor living and working in Lewes, Delaware. She specializes in lost-wax casting in bronze.

== Biography ==
Visbal was born in Montevideo, Uruguay, the daughter of American Ralph Albert and Elizabeth Krystyniak Visbal; the father was in foreign service there at the time of her birth. She attended the University of Arizona in Tucson 1980–1982 and University of Maryland 1983–1984. She is a Bachelor of Arts summa cum laude at Salisbury State University of 1995. She was an apprentice of lost wax fine art casting at Johnson Atelier Foundry, Mercerville, New Jersey, 1995–1998, and is the owner and manager of Visbal Fine Bronze Sculpture in Lewes, Delaware since 1998.

Fearless Girl, Visbal's most prominent work

Her most prominent work of public art is Fearless Girl (2017), a 50-inch (1,300 mm) bronze figure originally installed at Bowling Green in Manhattan's Financial District, stirring much international attention and controversy, as it challenges the Charging Bull sculpture of 1989. Visbal has said "The piece is pungent with Girl Power!" In 2018, it was relocated to outside the New York Stock Exchange Building.

=== Lawsuits ===
Kristen Visbal was sued for taking $28,102 from the US Coast Guard Alumni Association to make an Alexander Hamilton statue but allegedly failing to produce the work by the contracted deadline.

On January 3, 2020, State Street Global Advisors (SSGA) sued Kristen Visbal, over issues concerning the artist's rights to sell replicas of the Fearless Girl. The court held there was no fraudulent inducement on behalf of SSGA in the formation of the contract.

On May 27, 2020, in a later opinion Visbal's fourteenth affirmative defence was struck out due to a failure to meet the Bridgestone/Firestone requirements.

== Awards ==
- Charlotte Dunwiddle Memorial Award for a Realistic Sculpture by the Pen and Brush Club (2003) - Jessica (2002)
- The Gold Medal of Honor by the National Arts Club (NYC) (2006) - The Prowler (2006)
- A series of awards for the Fearless Girl Sculpture including 18 Cannes Lions (2017)

== Other selected works of public art ==
- Goddess of the Sea, a mermaid with two dolphins framed in water, Myrtle Beach, South Carolina
- The Cradle of Coaches (2009-2011 and 2014), a series of ten 120% lifesize statues of celebrated football coaches (Thomas Van Voorhis, Carmen Cozza, Weeb Ewbank, Paul Dietzel, Red Blaik, Paul Brown, Bo Schembechler, Ara Parseghian, John Pont, John Harbaugh) at Miami University's Cradle of Coaches Plaza in Oxford, Ohio.
- In Search of Atlantis (2009), a girl swimming with a green sea turtle, Atlantic Beach, Florida
- The American Cape (2004), a 12 feet 4 inches (3.76 m) statue of Alexander Hamilton in Hamilton, Ohio; Hamilton's full-length cape represents the 13-star American flag of the time.
- Sea Express (2003), a man riding on a bottlenose dolphin, Jacksonville Beach, Florida
- Passing the Torch (2002), a statue of Olympic athlete Bob Hayes (1942-2002), Jacksonville, Florida; Hayes wears his 1964 Olympics clothing and carries the Olympic torch.
- Girl Chasing Butterflies (1998), Merrill Lynch HQ in Plainsboro, New Jersey, and (2005) revised version in Hershey Gardens, Pennsylvania
