= Harambe (disambiguation) =

Harambe was a gorilla shot and killed by staff at the Cincinnati Zoo in 2016 after a child climbed into his enclosure.

Harambe may also refer to:

- Harambe (statue), 2021, New York City
- Harambe, a fictional East African village in Disney's Animal Kingdom
- "Harambe (Working Together for Freedom)", a 1988 song by Rita Marley
- "Harambe", a 2016 song by Young Thug from his mixtape Jeffery

== See also ==
- "RIP Harambe", a 2019 song by Elon Musk
- Harambee (disambiguation)
