= Gorilla (sculpture) =

Sculpture of Guy the Gorilla, Crystal Palace Park, London

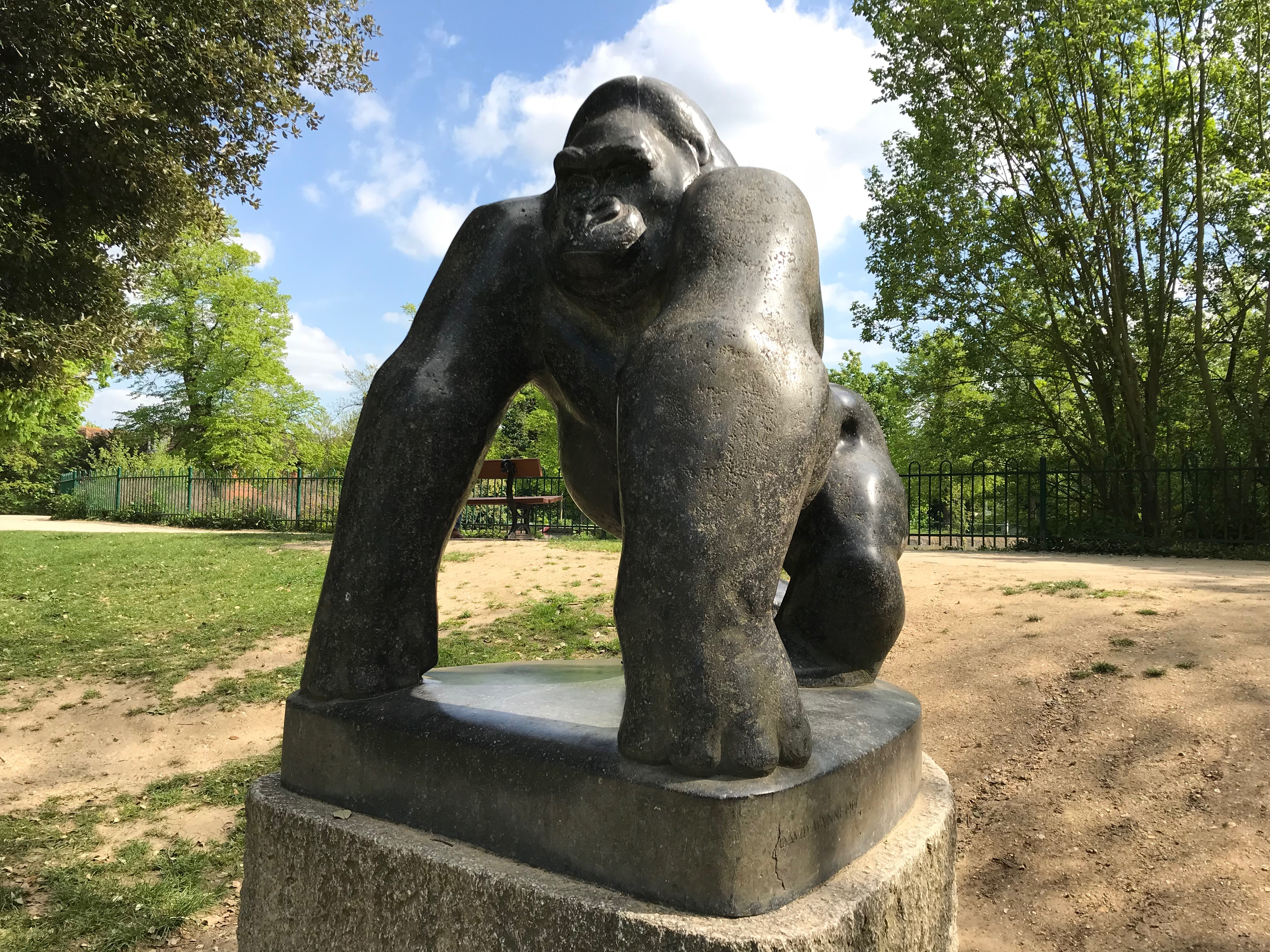
- Guy the Gorilla in Crystal Palace Park
- Artist: David Wynne
- Completion date: 1961; 65 years ago
- Type: sculpture
- Medium: Marble
- Subject: Guy the Gorilla
- Dimensions: 1.2 m (3.9 ft)
- Location: Crystal Palace Park; London SE20 8DS; 51.4188°N 0.0646°W

Listed Building – Grade II
- Official name: Gorilla sculpture
- Designated: 19 January 2016
- Reference no.: 1431362

The Gorilla sculpture by David Wynne stands beside the Lower Lake in Crystal Palace Park, in Bromley in south-east London. Completed in 1961 and installed in 1962, the black marble sculpture depicts Guy the Gorilla, a western lowland gorilla brought from West Africa to London Zoo in 1947. It became a Grade II listed structure in 2016.

== Background ==
Guy the Gorilla was born at some point in 1946 in what was then French Cameroon. Captured in 1947, he arrived at London Zoo on 5 November 1947 (Guy Fawkes Day) and was christened "Guy". He became one of the zoo's major attractions, famed for his gentle disposition. He died in 1978 of a heart attack while under general anaesthetic during an operation to extract a tooth. His taxidermied remains are displayed at the entrance to the "Treasures" gallery in the central Hintze Hall at the Natural History Museum. In addition to the sculpture at Crystal Palace Park, Guy is also commemorated by a bronze statue by William Timym, which was installed at London Zoo in 1982.

In 1959, David Wynne was commissioned through London County Council's Patronage of the Arts Scheme to create a large animal sculpture, with the site to be determined later. Wynne had studied zoology at the University of Cambridge, and he chose the popular Guy the Gorilla as his subject. The work was completed in 1961, and the finished sculpture was installed in 1962 near the children's zoo at Crystal Palace Park. (The children's zoo closed around 1990.) The statue was subsequently credited with launching Wynne's artistic career. Never popular with the art establishment, Wynne's figurative sculptures, mainly of animals but also of such people of note as Thomas Beecham, John Gielgud and The Beatles, won affection from the public. Among his most controversial works was the centrepiece to the Queen Elizabeth Gate at Hyde Park Corner. Wynne died in 2014.

== Description ==
The sculpture of Guy the Gorilla is made of polished black fossiliferous Belgian marble and stands 1.2 m (3 ft 11 in) high on a marble base with a roughly finished granite plinth. The base bears the sculptor's name and the date—"David Wynne 1961"—and the title "GORILLA" is carved into the plinth. The gorilla is standing on all fours: Wynne wanted the "powerful" form to convey "all his feelings of awe and terror and love for this mighty beast". Jo Darke, in her history of English and Welsh monuments, notes that Wynne's intention for the piece to be an interactive sculpture was achieved; "children pat, stroke and climb as well as look".

It stands on the north side of the Lower Lake in Crystal Palace Park, near the park café. The Crystal Palace Dinosaurs are installed on an island further around the lake: Pevsner notes that Guy is "a recent addition to the herd". The work was listed at Grade II, the grading given to buildings and structures of "special interest", in 2016. The park itself is listed at Grade II* in the Register of Parks and Gardens, and the Crystal Palace Dinosaurs have a Grade I listing.

== See also ==
- Harambe, 2021 statue in New York City

== Sources ==
- Cherry, Bridget; Pevsner, Nikolaus (2002). London 2: South. The Buildings of England. New Haven, US, London, UK: Yale University Press. ISBN 0-300-09651-8.
- Darke, Jo (1991). The Monument Guide to England and Wales: A National Portrait in Bronze and Stone. London: MacDonald and Co. OCLC 1008240876.
