= Harambee (disambiguation) =

Harambee is an East African tradition of community self-help events, and is also the official motto of Kenya.

Harambee may also refer to:

- Harambee (African-American newspaper), a publication of the Los Angeles Black Congress
- Harambee (neighborhood), a neighborhood in Milwaukee
- Harambee Park, a park in Boston, Massachusetts
- Harambee Stars, nickname for the Kenya national football team
- Harambee Youth Employment Accelerator, organisation which assists first-time job seekers in South Africa
- MV Harambee, a German-built ship in service between 1953 and 1980

== See also ==
- Harambe (disambiguation)
- "Harambee Harambee", a popular Kenyan song by Daudi Kabaka
