= Big Bull, India =

Bronze sculpture in GIFT City, Gujarat, India

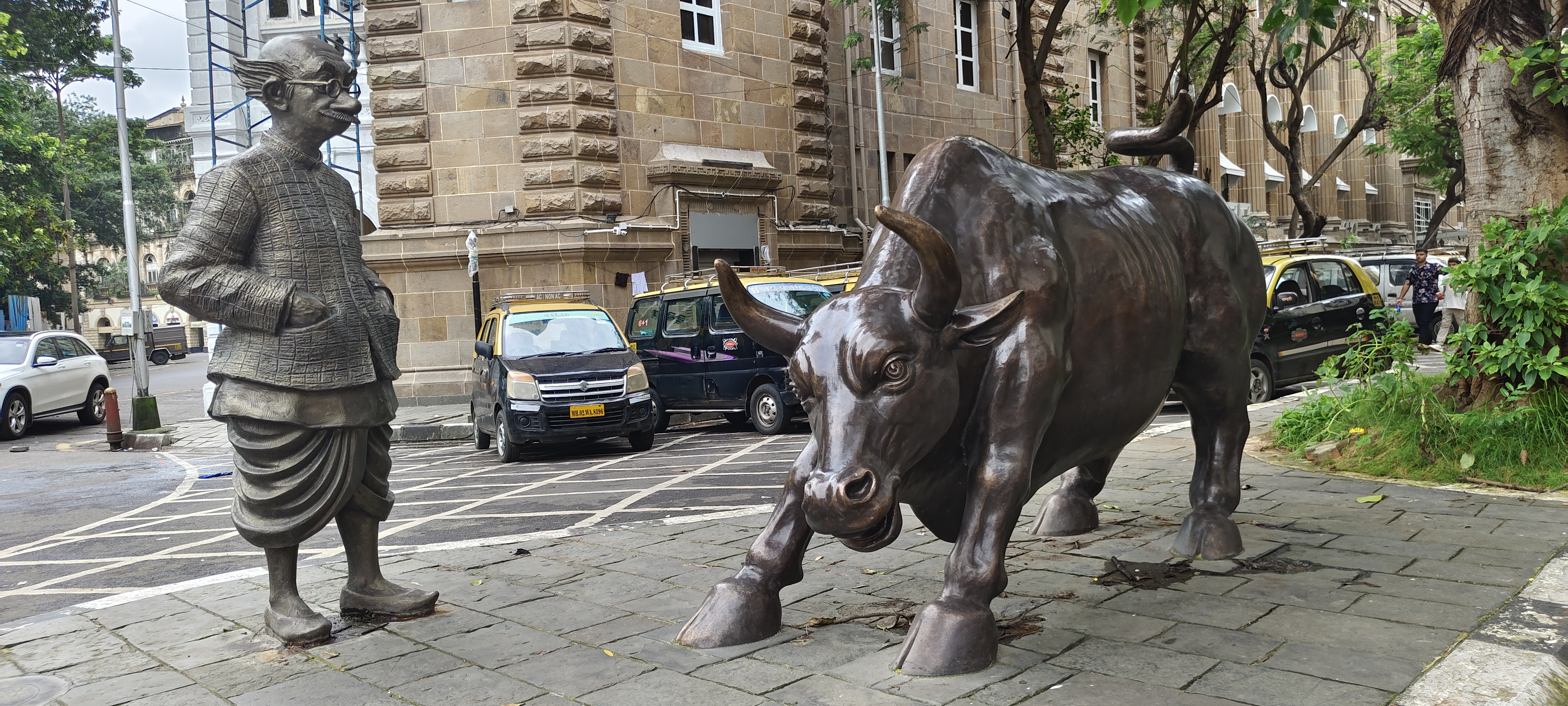
- Artist: Bhagwan Rampure
- Year: 2008
- Medium: Bronze
- Dimensions: 5 feet (1.5 m) tall & 8 feet (2.4 m) long
- Weight: 1,000 kilograms (2,200 lb)
- Location: Mumbai, Maharashtra, India GIFT City, Gujarat, India

The Big Bull is a bronze sculpture of a charging bull designed by Solapur-based sculptor Bhagwan Rampure and was originally located inside the premises of the Bombay Stock Exchange (BSE) on Dalal Street in Mumbai, Maharashtra, India. The sculpture was installed outside the building of Bombay Stock Exchange on 11 January 2008. The bull is inspired by Arturo Di Modica's Charging Bull sculpture that was installed on Wall Street outside the New York Stock Exchange Building in 1989. The Big Bull is 5 feet (1.5 m) tall, 8 feet (2.4 m) long and weighs 1,000 kilograms (2,200 lb).

It was relocated to the Gujarat International Finance Tec-City (GIFT City) near Ahmedabad in 2017.

On April 27, 2023 a replica of Big bull is installed on the outskirts of Dalal Street with RK Laxmans Common man Statue.

== Design ==
Rampure was approached by officials of the BSE in 2007 to design the sculpture. He was given photographs of the original sculpture in New York City and studied live bulls to understand their anatomy. A clay model was first designed for the BSE's approval following which the bronze version was made. It was made in four parts owing to its size and took Rampure three months to design and build. While he was allowed to make a few changes to the design, the original pose of the bull was retained owing to the animal's identity in stock markets as a symbol of money. The BSE later commissioned him to create a thousand miniature replicas made of fibre to be given as souvenirs to visiting foreign dignitaries.

== Controversy ==
The sculpture came into news after the stock market crash of January 2008, when the Sensex lost 14% in two days and ₹180,000 crore (equivalent to ₹5.5 trillion or US$57 billion in 2026) in a week, along its year-long descent from 20,000 to 8,000. The bull was subsequently considered as a panvati or bad omen. Several brokers demanded the removal of the sculpture during the crash, with an astrologer suggesting that it be re-installed at a more auspicious time. A group of 200 to 300 brokers protested outside the exchange for a day asking for it to be removed.

In 2017, prior to its relocation to GIFT City, the BSE decided to allow visitors to photograph the bull. However, due to security issues, it was replaced by an acrylic replica on rollers outside the exchange. The Municipal Corporation of Greater Mumbai (MCGM) objected to this, claiming that it was inconveniencing people on the road and asked for it to be removed.
