= Guy the Gorilla =

Western lowland gorilla (1946–1978)

Guy
- Guy the Gorilla in 1958.
- Species: Western lowland gorilla (Gorilla gorilla gorilla)
- Sex: Male
- Born: c. 1946
- Died: 8 June 1978 (aged 31–32); London Zoo, London, England
- Cause of death: Heart attack
- Residence: London Zoo, London, England
- Weight: 34 st (476 lb; 216 kg)
- Height: 5 ft 4 in (1.63 m)
- Named after: Guy Fawkes Night

Guy the Gorilla (1946–1978) was a western lowland gorilla (Gorilla gorilla gorilla) who was London Zoo's most famous resident and often profiled on children's TV shows and natural history productions. The exact day of Guy's birth was unknown, but his official birthday was set by the Zoo as May 30, and he received large numbers of cards each year.

== Life ==
Guy arrived at the zoo on 5 November 1947, Guy Fawkes Night, hence his name. A baby, holding a small tin hot-water bottle, he weighed just 23 pounds (10 kg). Guy was the replacement for the zoo's previous gorilla, Meng, who had died in 1941. Guy was captured in French Cameroon on behalf of the Paris Zoo and was traded for a tiger from Calcutta Zoo. It was arranged that London Zoo would receive Guy. The Paris Zoo Director sent instructions to their game department in West Africa to find a suitable female to mate with him.

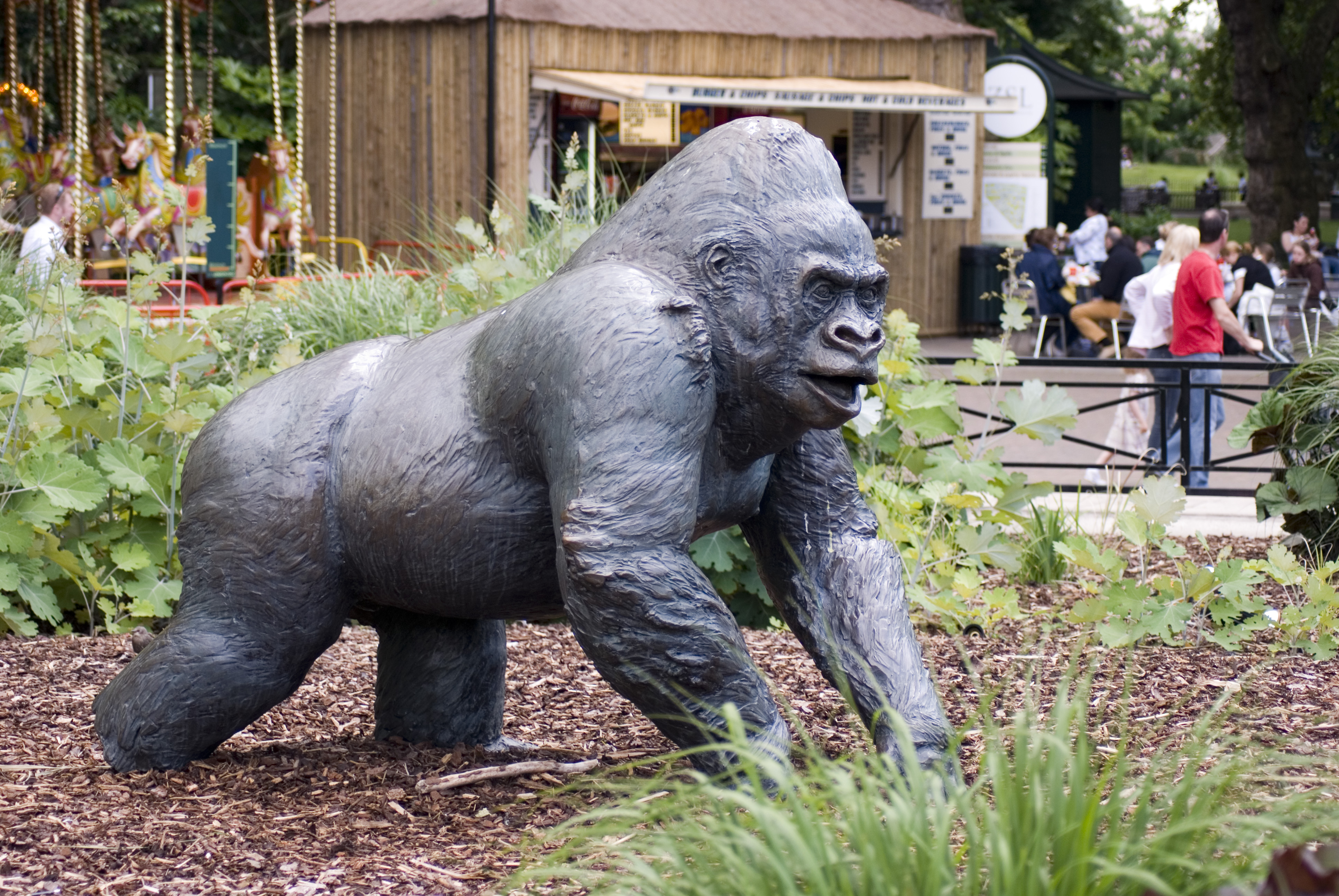
Statue of Guy the Gorilla in London Zoo

London sent a request to animal dealers and zoos worldwide to find a mate, and in 1969 the zoo was offered Lomie, a five-year-old female who had been living in nearby Chessington Zoo. She then lived for a year in the old Monkey House in London Zoo before being introduced to Guy. When the new Ape and Monkey House, the Michael Sobell Pavilion, was opened in 1971, Guy and Lomie were finally introduced. However, after 25 years of isolation, it was too late; they never produced any offspring.

Lowland gorillas are the world's largest primates. Males can weigh between 140 and 275 kg. Guy's dimensions as a silverback were measured in 1966 and 1971: he weighed 34 stone (476 lb; 216 kg), was 5 feet 4 inches (1.63 m) tall, and had an arm span of 9 feet (2.7 m). His upper arm had a circumference of 23.5 inches (60 cm), his thighs 28 inches (70 cm), and his neck 36 inches (90 cm).

His appearance was fearsome, yet his nature was very gentle; when small birds flew into his cage, he was often seen to lift them on his hands and examine them softly. This gentleness is said to have been a major part of his great popularity. That said, he was involved in minor incidents when zoo visitors disobeyed safety barriers. He bit a small boy in 1956, after the boy's mother lifted him over the barrier to feed Guy. And he bit a man who climbed across the protective barrier to stroke the gorilla through the cage bars.

Guy died in 1978, aged 31 or 32, of a heart attack during an operation on his infected teeth. His tooth decay had been caused by the fact that visitors were allowed to feed him sweets.

During pre-production for the film 2001: A Space Odyssey (1968), Dan Richter – who played the lead ape-man ("Moonwatcher") in the film – studied Guy intently and modelled his acting and mime performance partly on Guy's behaviour.

English musician David Dundas released his album Vertical Hold in 1978, which featured a song devoted to "Guy The Gorilla".

English Test cricket captain Ian Botham was nicknamed Guy the Gorilla “as way to sum up his muscular approach to cricket – and life”.

== Legacy ==
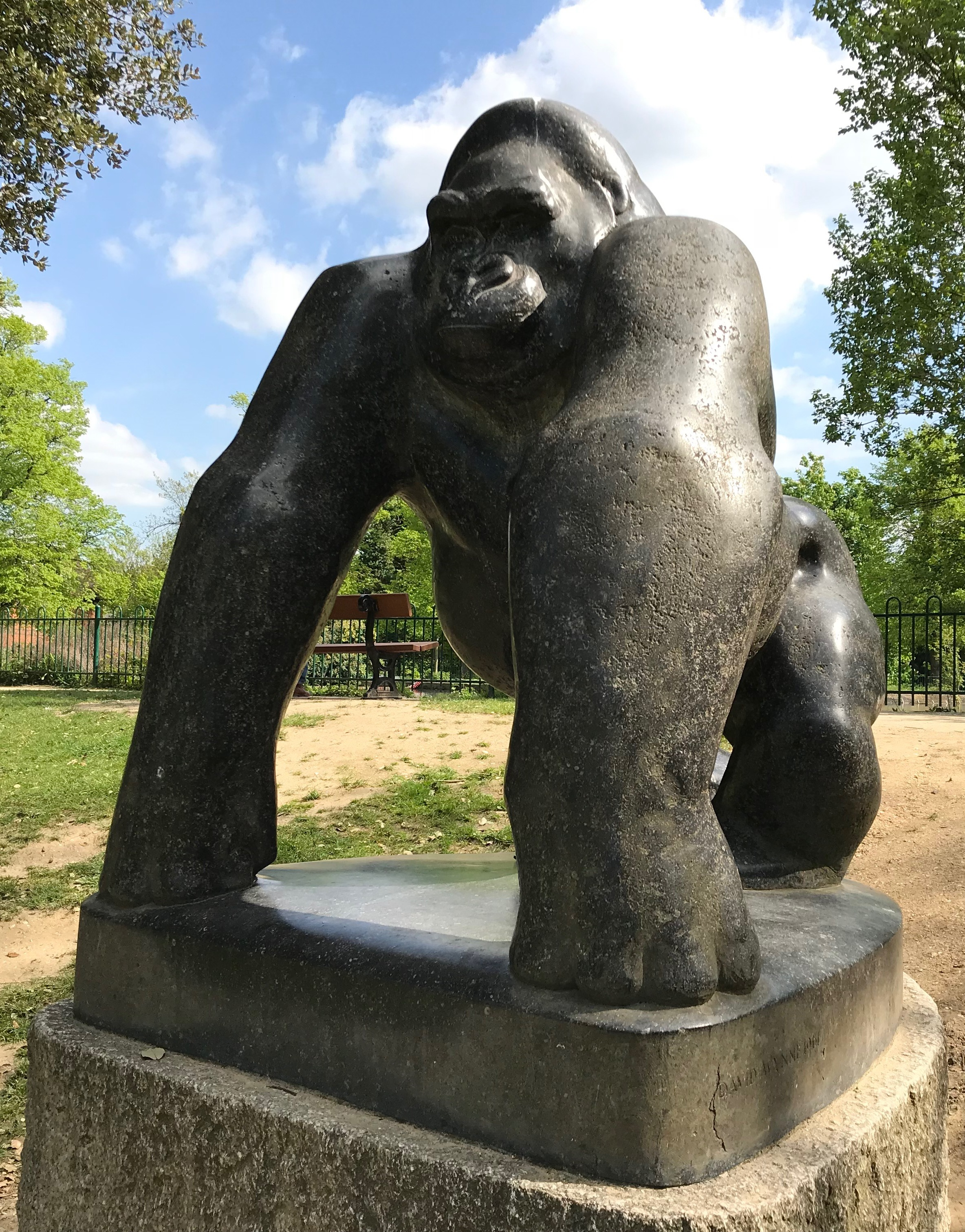
David Wynne's 1961 statue in Crystal Palace Park

- A statue of Guy by the sculptor David Wynne was erected in Crystal Palace Park in 1961.
- After his death, Guy's body was taxidermied and placed on display at London's Natural History Museum. Years later, the taxidermy was taken out of public display and moved into the scientific study collections. As of late 2012, however, it had been returned to public display as part of the permanent new 'Treasures' exhibition in the museum's Cadogan Gallery.
- In 1982, Guy was commemorated by a bronze statue by William Timym, located near London Zoo's main entrance, by the Michael Sobell Pavilion for Monkeys and Apes, where Guy spent his final years. He is also commemorated in an oil painting by Timym which hangs in the library of the Zoological Society of London, the charity which runs London zoo.

== See also ==
- List of individual apes
