= Thane Maynard =

American zookeeper and author

Thane Maynard is an American zookeeper and author who served as the director of the Cincinnati Zoo and Botanical Garden (2007-2015). He is also an author and the host of The 90-Second Naturalist, a 1½-minute syndicated radio program produced at Cincinnati Public Radio stations WGUC and WVXU. Often appearing on Late Night with Conan O'Brien, Maynard has also been featured on Good Morning America, The Today Show, and CBS This Morning. He is actively involved in the Association of Zoos and Aquariums, and is a member of Leadership Cincinnati Class XVII, The Hillside Trust, and The Ohio Chapter of TNC.

When Harambe, a male 17-year-old Silverback gorilla, was shot dead after a 3-year-old boy managed to slip into the gorilla enclosure at the Cincinnati Zoo, Maynard justified the killing of the gorilla because he felt the child's life was in serious danger. Animal rights groups and others have questioned both the adequacy of the enclosure and the necessity for killing the gorilla. Thane defended this dedication publicly to much controversy.

Maynard is co-author with Jane Goodall and Gail Hudson of Hope for Animals and Their World: How Endangered Species Are Being Rescued from the Brink.
