= David Wynne (sculptor) =

British sculptor (1926–2014)

David Wynne OBE
- Born: 25 May 1926
- Died: 4 September 2014 (aged 88)
- Citizenship: British subject
- Known for: Sculpture
- Children: 2, including Ed and Roland

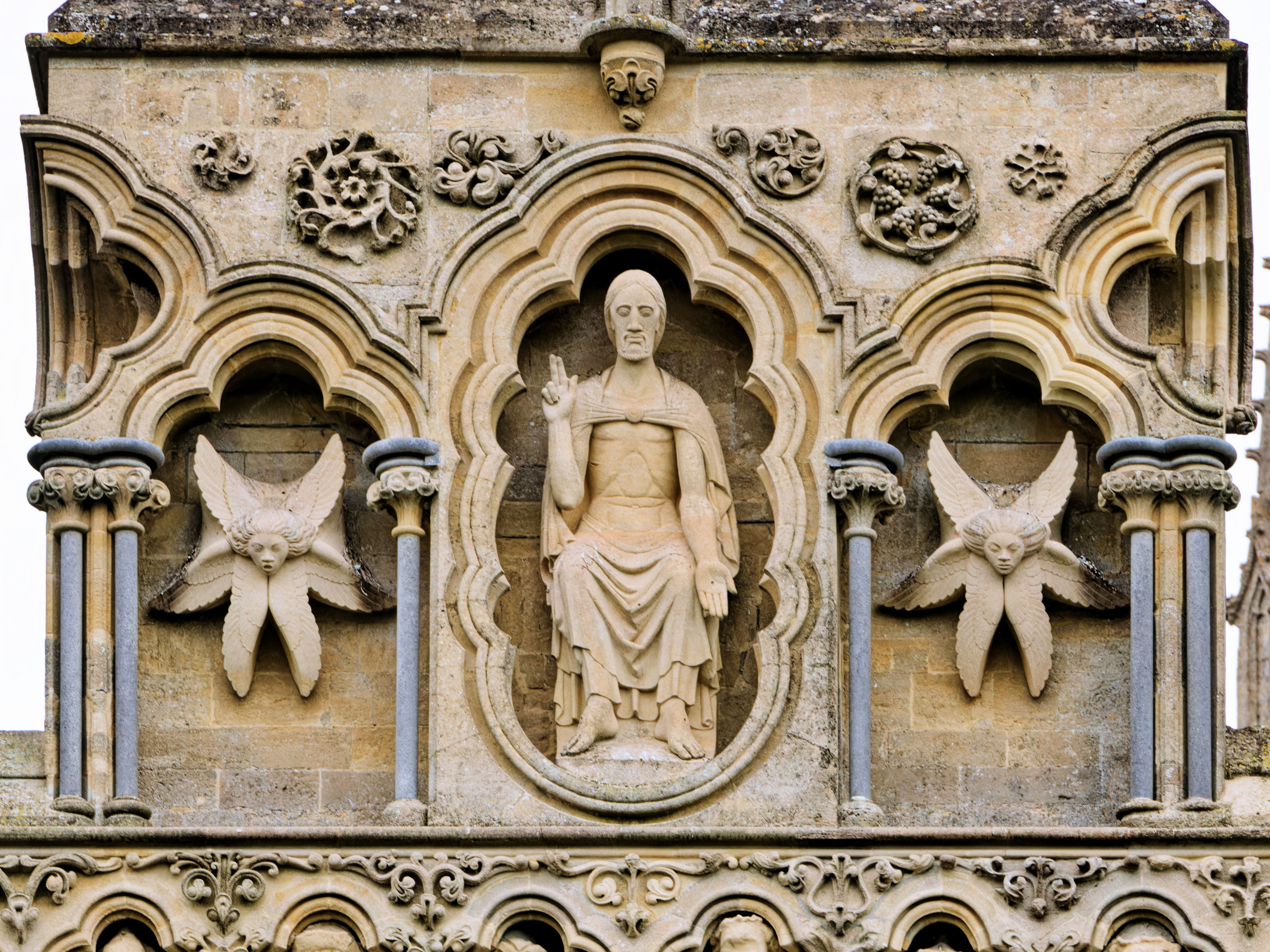
Risen Christ and Seraphim (1985)

David Wynne OBE (25 May 1926 – 4 September 2014) was a British sculptor of figures, animals and portraits.

== Biography ==
Born in Lyndhurst, Hampshire, son of Commander Charles Edward Wynne and Millicent (née Beyts), Wynne was educated at Stowe School, served in the Royal Navy during World War II, and then read Zoology at Trinity College, Cambridge, taking up sculpture professionally in 1950. He married Gillian Grant, daughter of the writer Joan Grant, in 1959 and had two sons, Edward and Roland, who formed psychedelic rock band Ozric Tentacles.

He did a bronze sculpture of the Beatles in 1964 and subsequently introduced them to the Maharishi Mahesh Yogi (of whom he previously did a sculpture). Wynne considered his limestone Risen Christ and Seraphim (1985), for the western front of Wells Cathedral, his most important commission.

He was awarded the OBE in 1994.

== Works ==
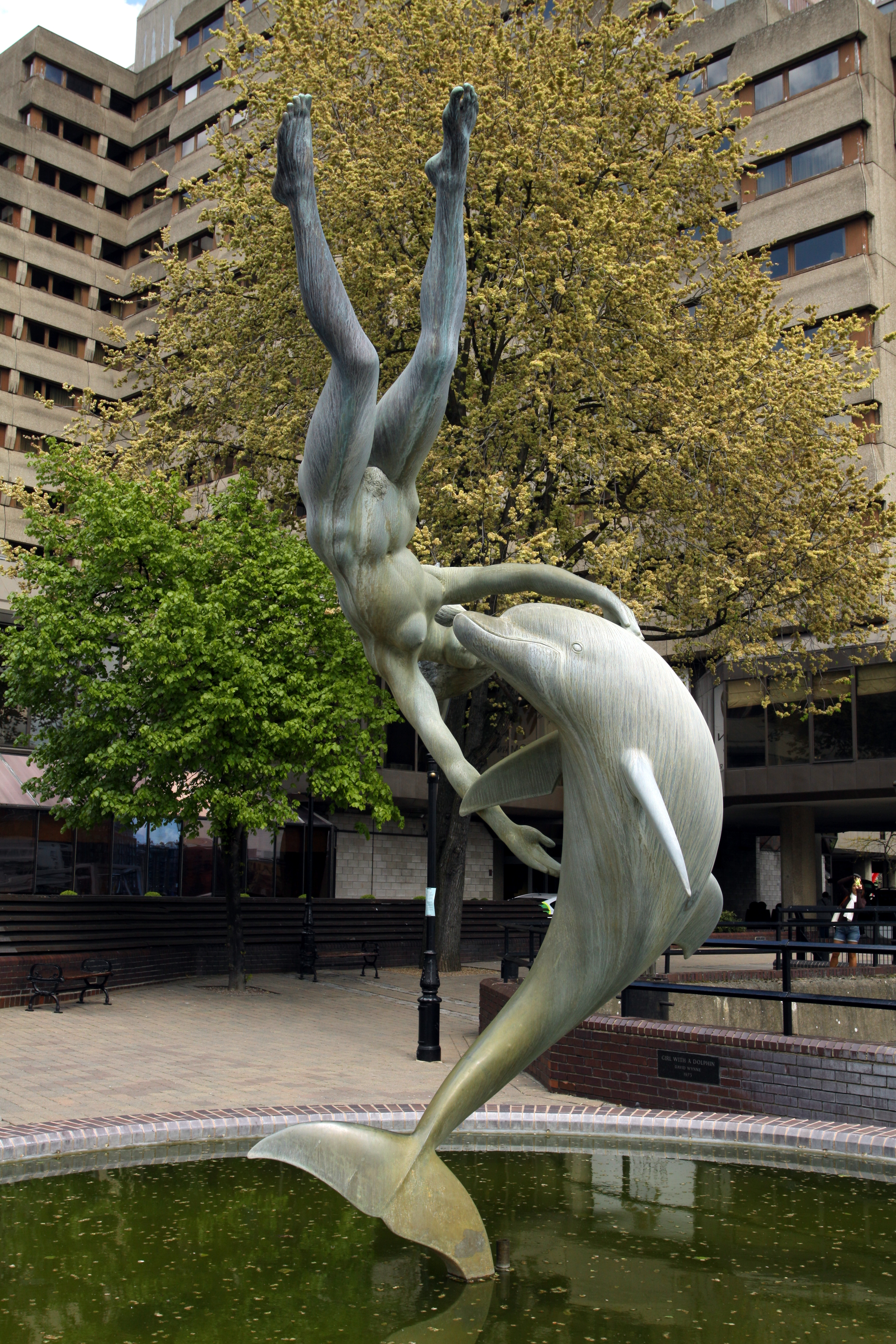
Girl with a dolphin (1973)

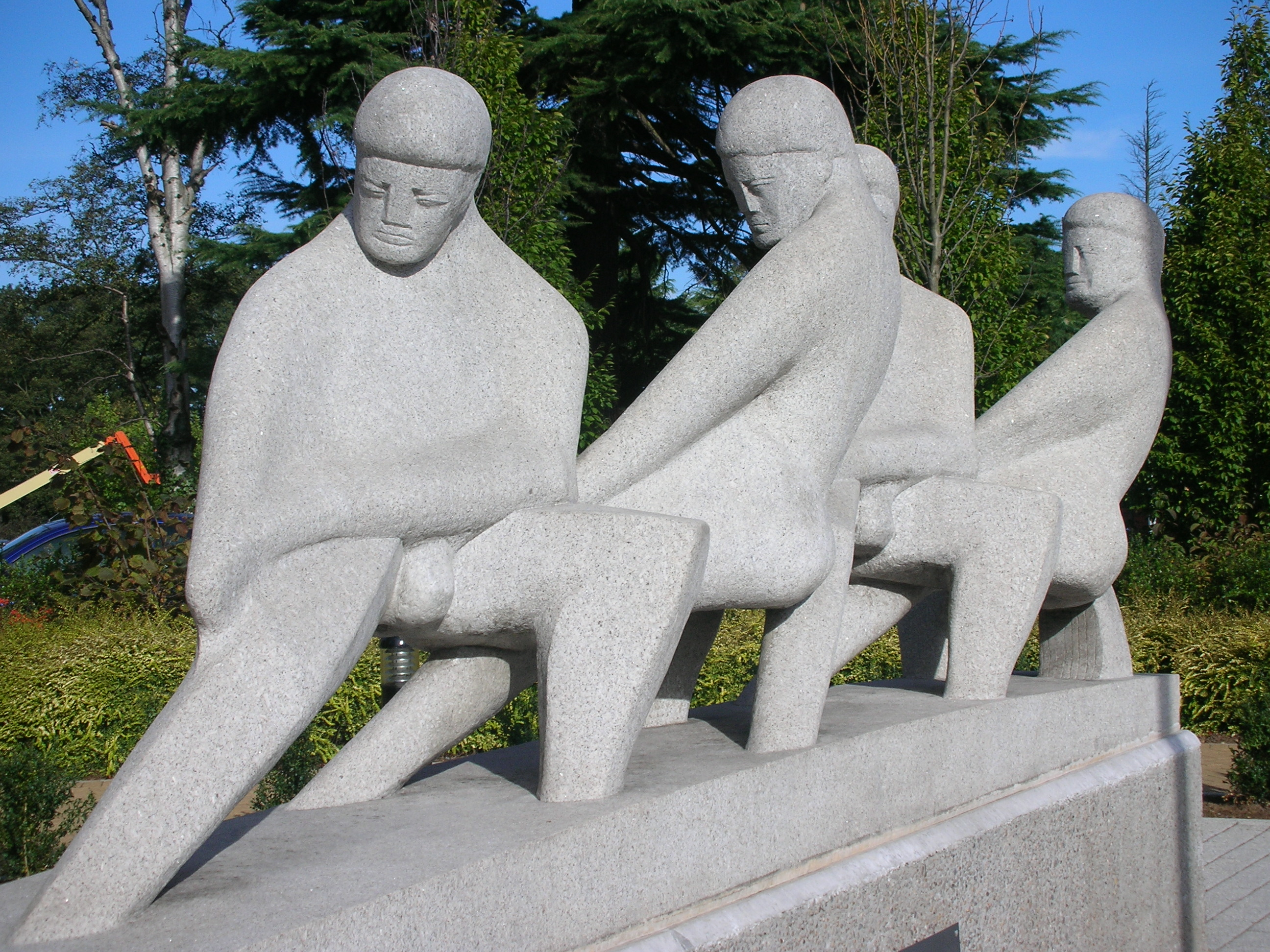
Teamwork (1958)

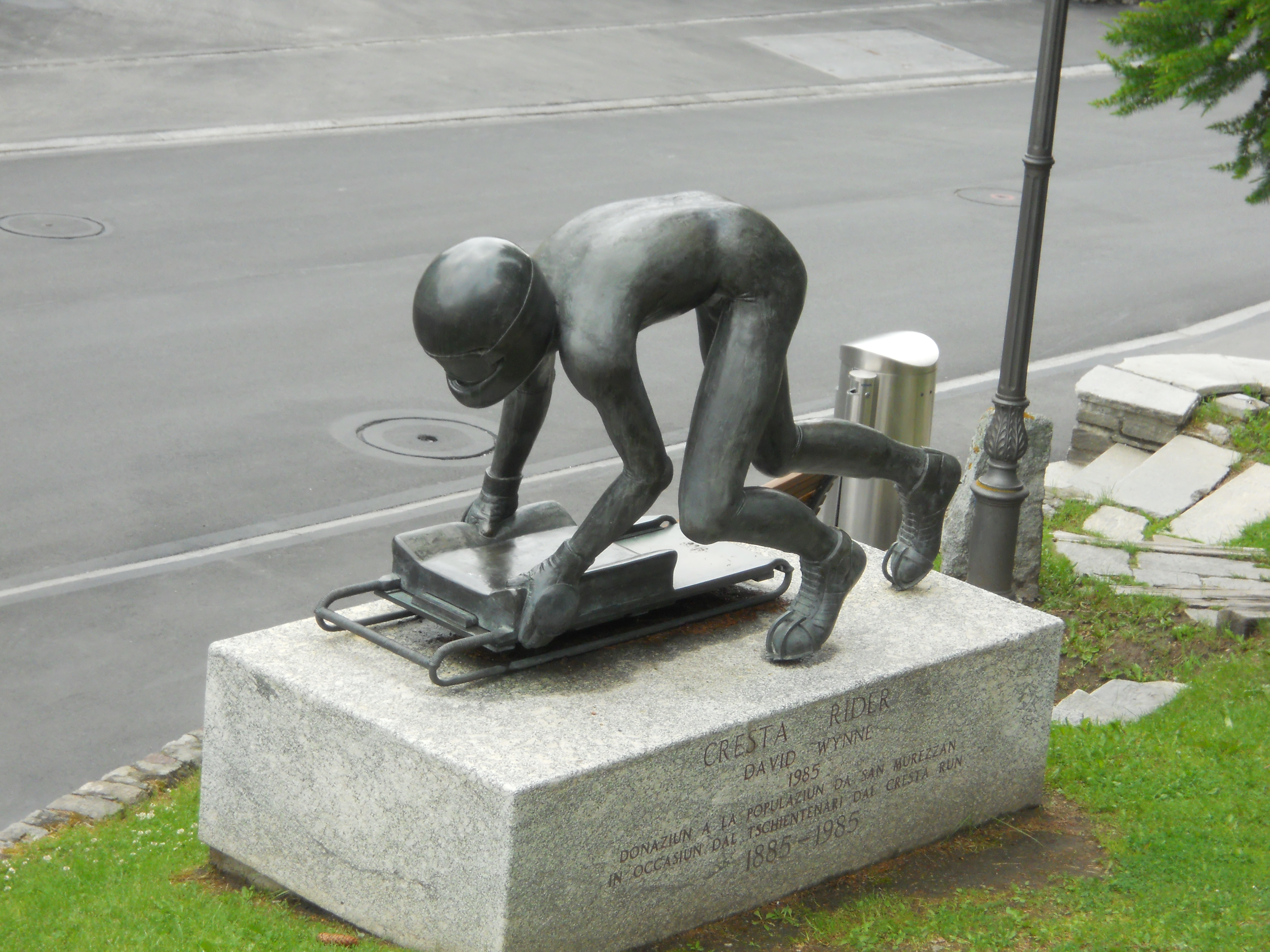
Cresta Rider (1985)

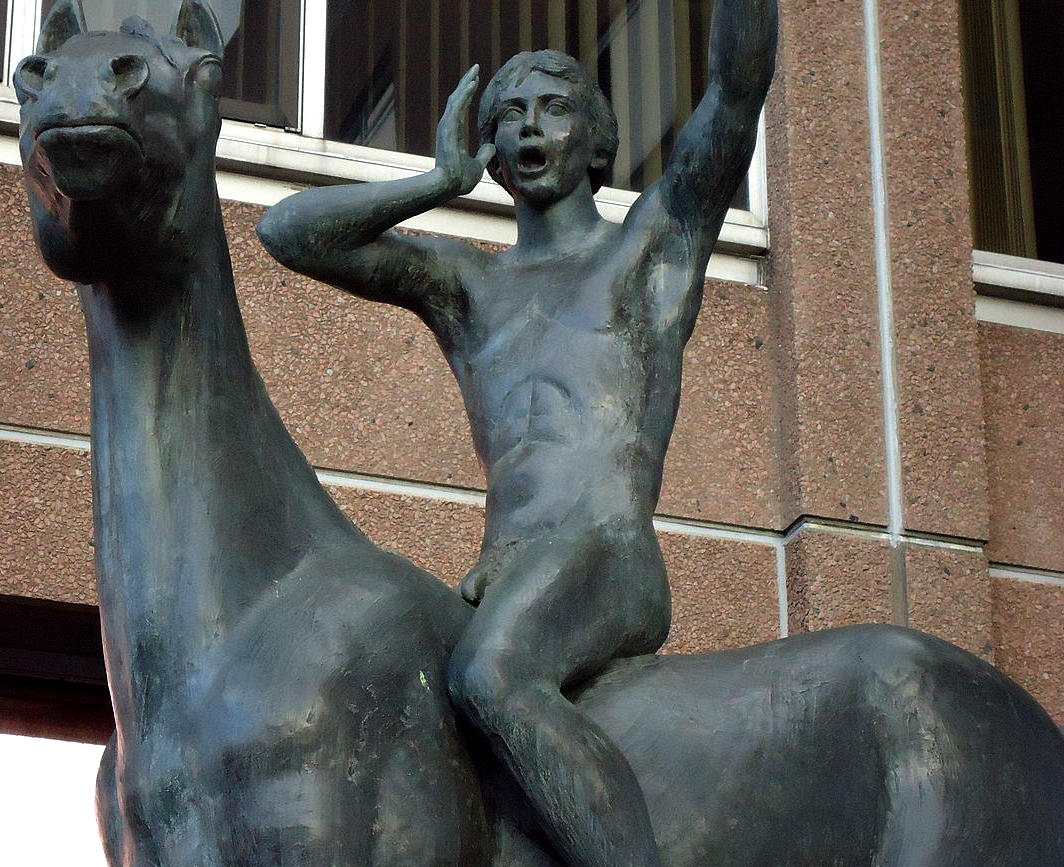
The Messenger (1981)

Wynne's sculptures include:

- Bird Fountains (1967) – Ambassador College, Pasadena, California
- Blessed Virgin Mary (2000) – Ely Cathedral
- The Breath of Life Column (1962) – location unknown (was Hammersmith)
- Boy with a Dolphin (1974) – Cheyne Walk
- Christ and Mary Magdalene (1963) – Ely Cathedral and Magdalen College, Oxford
- Cresta Rider (1985) – Saint Moritz
- Dancer with a Bird (1975) – Cadogan Square Gardens
- The Dancers (1971) – Cadogan Square Gardens
- Embracing Lovers (1973) – Guildhall, London
- Five Swimmers Fountain (1980) – Staines
- Fred Perry (1984) – All England Lawn Tennis and Croquet Club, Southfields, London
- Gaia and Tresco Children (1990) – Tresco Abbey Gardens
- Girl on a Horse – Donald M. Kendall Sculpture Gardens, Purchase, New York
- Girl with a Dolphin (1973) – by Tower Bridge, a bronze fountain "full of joy and life" posed by Virginia Wade
- Girl with Doves (1970) – University of Arizona, Tucson, Arizona
- Goddess of the Woods (1991) – Highgrove House
- Gorilla (sculpture) (1961) – Crystal Palace Park, south London, a sculpture of Guy the Gorilla
- Grizzly Bear – Donald M. Kendall Sculpture Gardens, Purchase, New York
- Leaping Salmon (1980) – Kingston upon Thames
- The Messenger (1981) – Sutton, London
- Queen Elizabeth Gate (1992) – Hyde Park Corner
- Risen Christ and Seraphim (1985) – Wells Cathedral
- River God Tyne (1968) – Newcastle Civic Centre
- The Spirit of Fire (1963) – originally Lewis's, later Debenhams, Hanley, Staffordshire
- Swans in Flight (1968) – Swans In Flight, Armstrong Auditorium, Edmond, Oklahoma
- Teamwork (1958) – for Taylor Woodrow headquarters, London and later Solihull; now at Taywood Road, Northolt, London
- UK 50 Pence Coin (1973) – Commemoration of the United Kingdom joining the European Economic Community
- "Christ on the Ass" (1954) Maquette III for The Entry into Jerusalem. CuratorsEye.com

Portraits include:

- Maharishi Mahesh Yogi (1962)
- Charles, Prince of Wales (1970)
- Joan Baez (1965)
- John Gielgud (1962) – Royal Shakespeare Theatre, Stratford-upon-Avon
- Oskar Kokoschka (1965) – Tate
- Queen Elizabeth II
- The Beatles (1964)
- Thomas Beecham (1956) – Royal Festival Hall, National Portrait Gallery, London, etc.
- Yehudi Menuhin (1963)
