= Bund Bull =

Sculpture in Shanghai, China

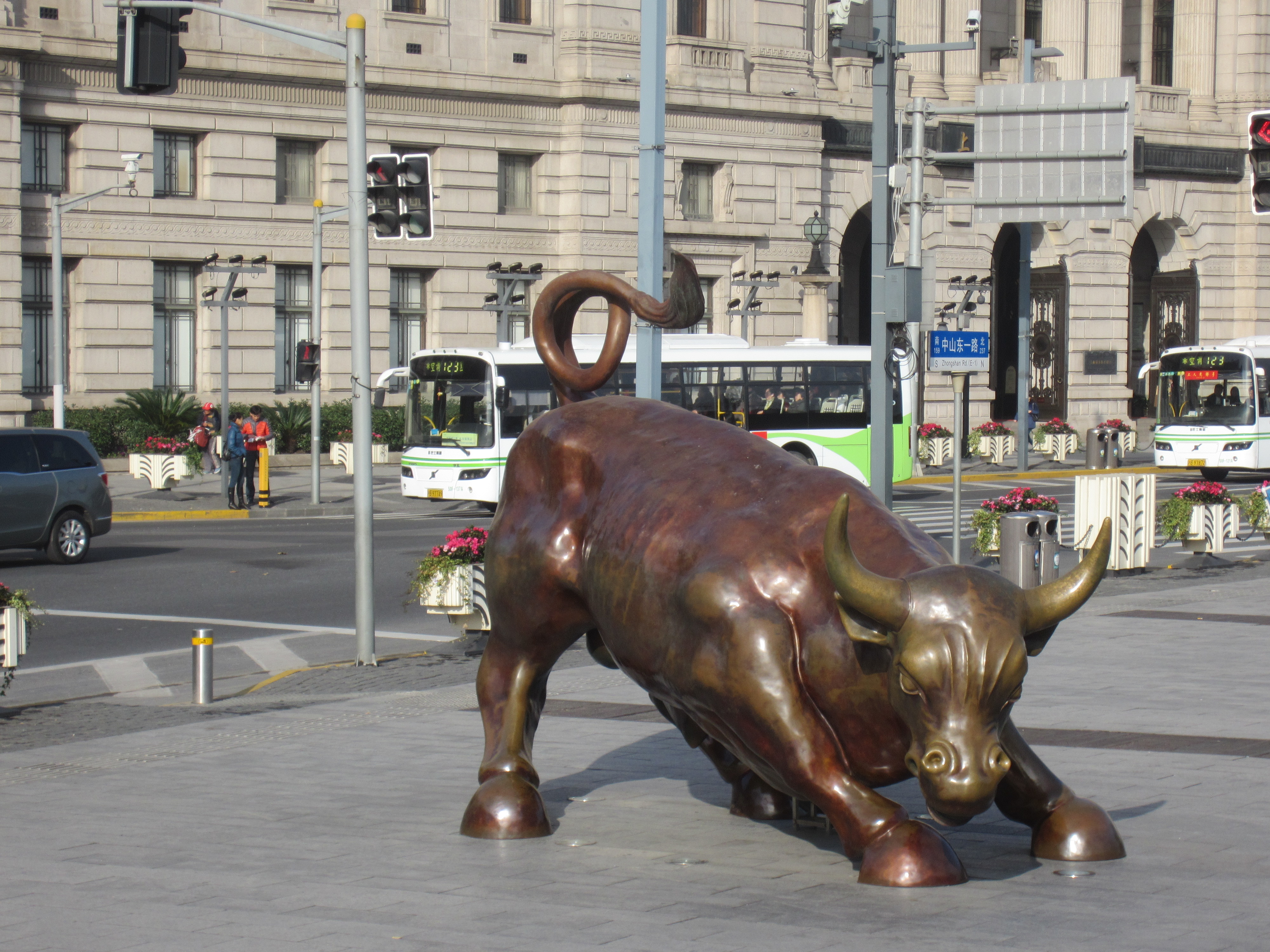
- Artist: Arturo Di Modica
- Year: 2010
- Type: Bronze
- Dimensions: 320 cm (130 in)
- Location: The Bund, Shanghai, China

The Shanghai Bull, the Bund Financial Bull or the Bund Bull are monikers associated with a derivative of Arturo Di Modica's Charging Bull installed in late April 2010 and unveiled on The Bund in Shanghai on May 15, 2010. Although the 13,227.74-pound (6,000.00 kg) work of art is said to have the same height, length and weight as the New York City Charging Bull, actually it is 17.1-foot (5.2 m) long and 10.5-foot (3.2 m) tall. The bull is reddish, as a tribute to the country that commissioned the work. It leans to right instead of the left like Charging Bull and has a more menacing tail. The Bull's popularity has been a problem for local authorities.

== Description ==
The bull is referred to by many names in the press with one claiming that local dignitaries tend to call it the Bund Financial Bull. Many stories use the moniker the Bund Bull. Some stories refer to it as the Shanghai Bull to differentiate it from the artist's other more famous bull in New York.

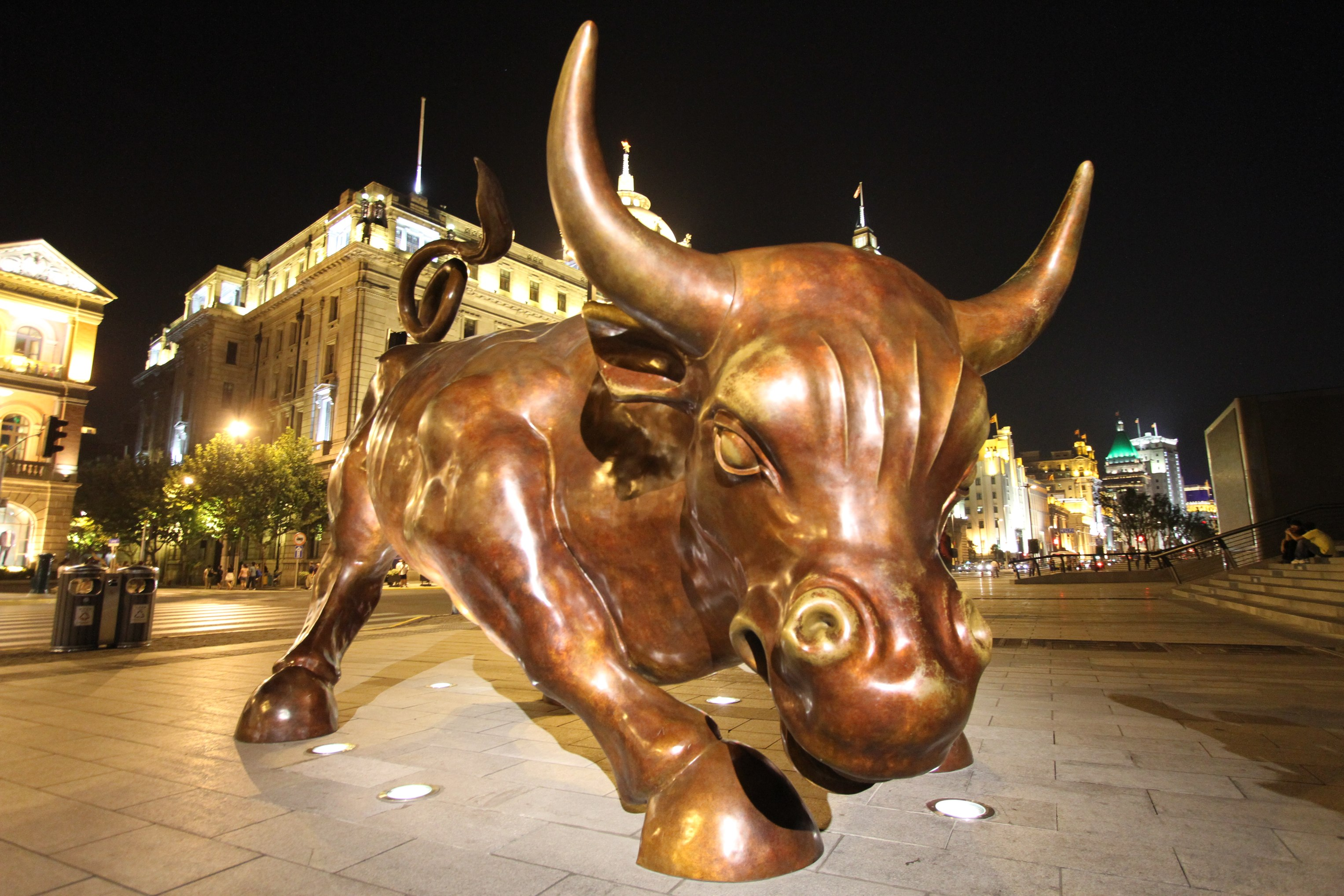
The Bund Bull at night, 2010

Di Modica credits both Western and Chinese cultures as influence on the work, noting that the "Charging Bull" and the Chinese zodiac's Ox served as inspiration. The bull is symbolic of perseverance, diligence and wealth in Chinese culture. The animal's confident stance represented a bullish and prosperous future for the rising financial center, Di Modica said. "It must be strong. It's about a strong nation," he says. "If you observe the tail of the bull, the tail is spirally pointing to the sky, meaning a uplifting financial trend," he said. The bull had been commissioned to be twice the size of Wall Street's Charging Bull. The city also requested a bull that was younger and stronger than New York City's bull to symbolise "the energy of Shanghai's economy", Zhou Wei, the head of Huangpu district said. "That's why the head of the Bund's bull looks up while the Wall Street Bull looks downward," he said.

The bronze bull was crafted in Wyoming by a team of 40 that made five identical versions. At 2.5 metres (8.2 ft) tall, 3.3 metres (11 ft) long and 2.5 tonnes (2.7 tons), it is the same size as the Wall Street version, but "redder, younger and stronger" Di Modica said. The work was supposed to have been completed before the Chinese year of the Ox ended in February 2010. The Bull was installed the week before the Expo 2010 Shanghai China, referred to as the Shanghai World Expo, which opened on May 1. Sometimes speaking in Italian, Di Modica attended the unveiling on May 15, 2010, on the Bund waterfront.

== Location ==
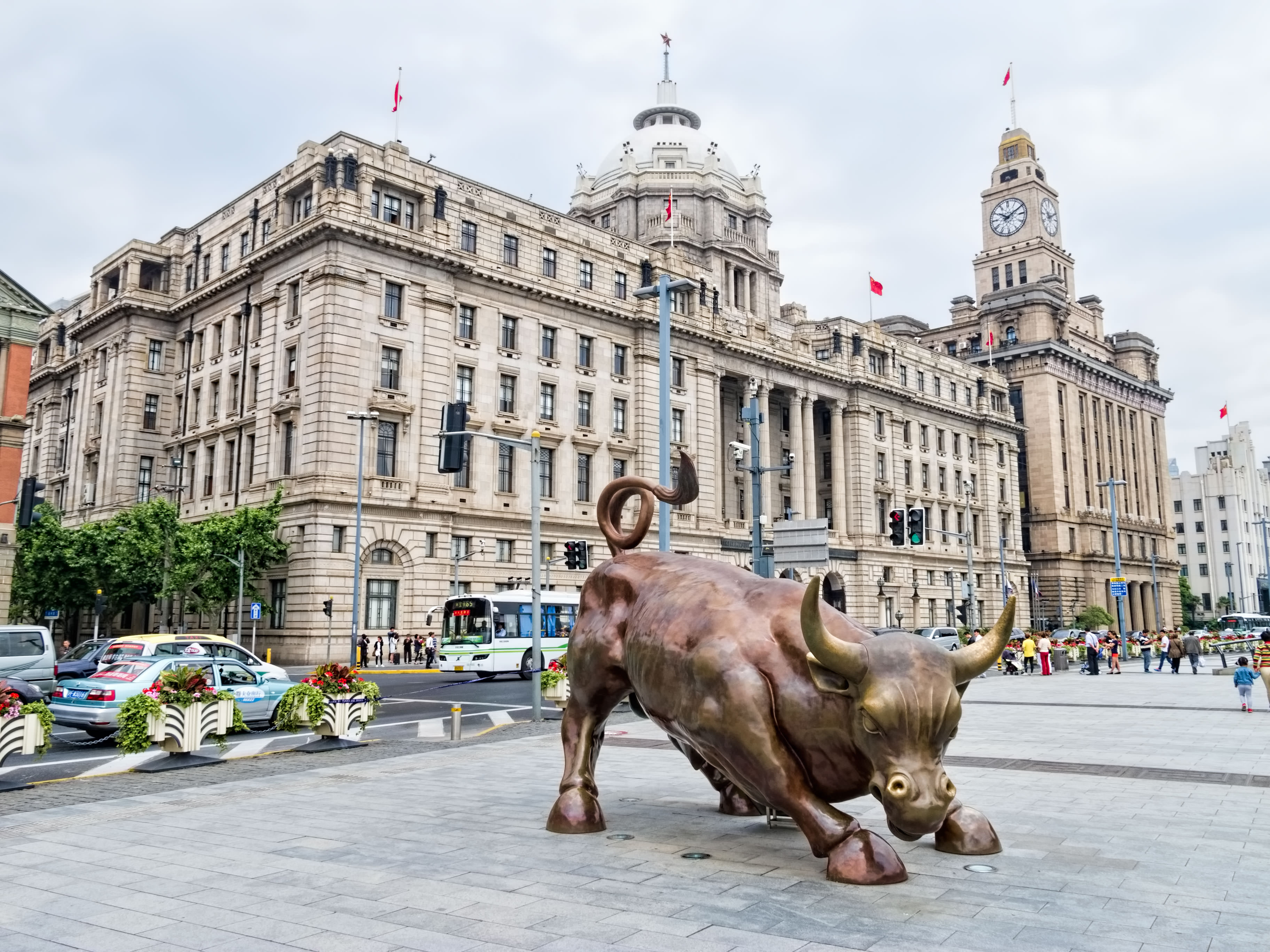
The sculpture and the HSBC building in 2016

It is located in the Bund, which is considered to be a location that symbolizes the era of European colonial capitalism in China, and it will be adjacent to the Huangpu River in Shanghai's Pudong district, which is a dynamically growing economic development zone. The bull is located in a square with four stock price screens across the river from the city's financial district. The newly opened square is being called Bund Financial Square.

Like its Wall Street counterpart, the Bund Bull's male genitalia is rumored to produce good luck when stroked. Despite a constant security, visitors attempt to climb the bull to pray for good luck and hang bags on the horns while taking pictures. Eventually, the cordoning was discontinued due to the strong public desire to be close to the bull.

== See also ==
- 2010 in art
- Cows on Parade
