= Man or bear =

Social media thought experiment

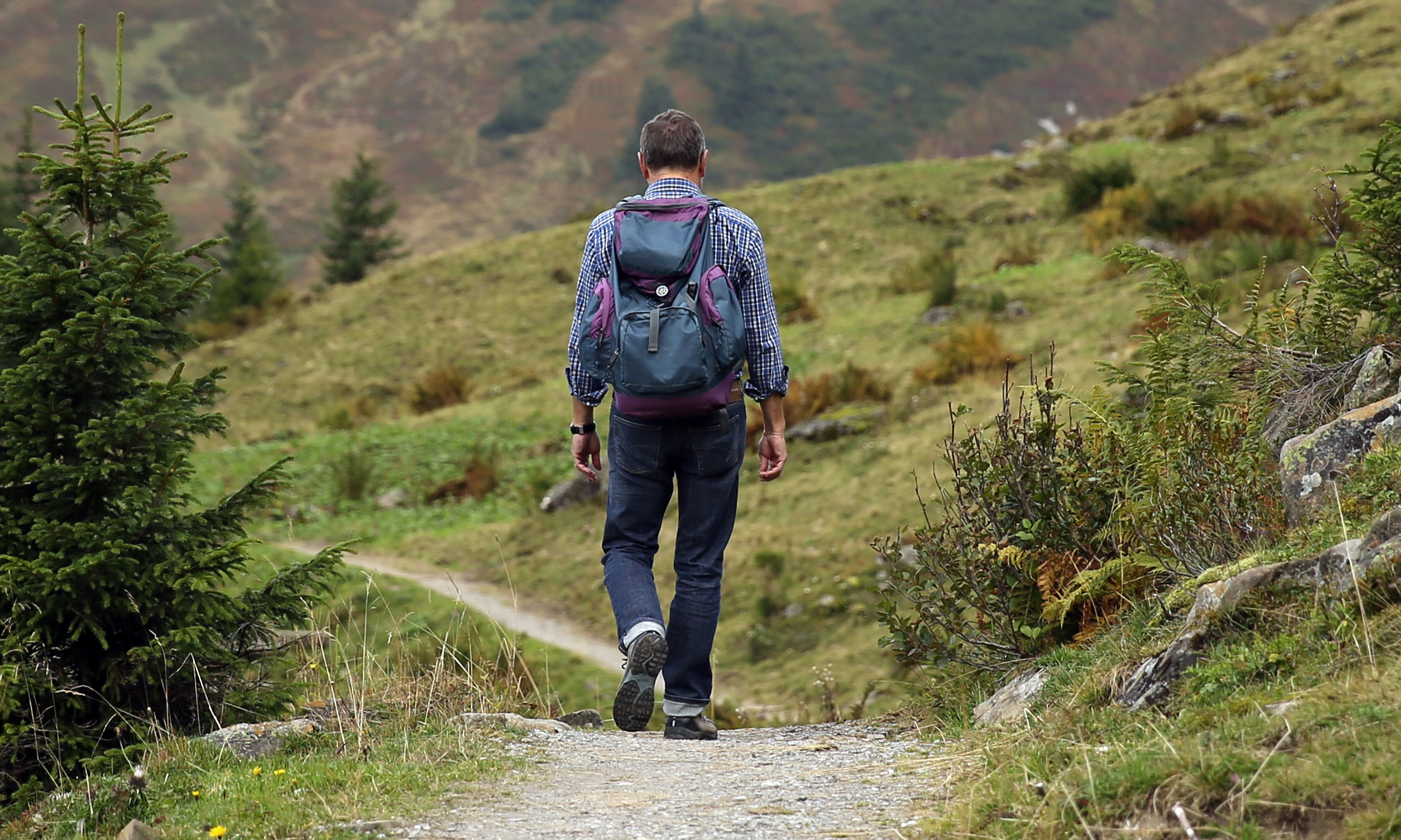
A man in the woods

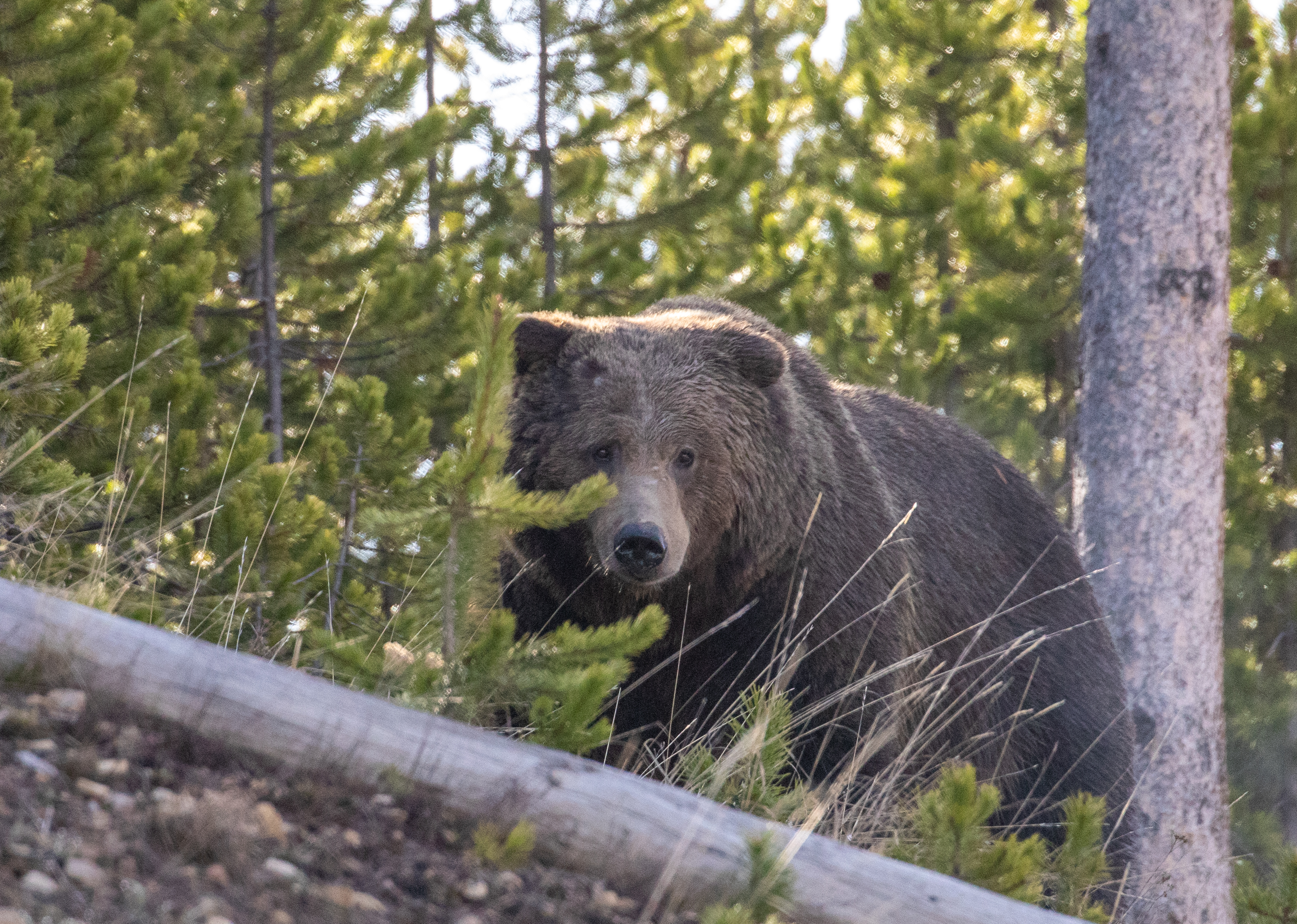
A grizzly bear in the woods

"Man or bear" (also called "man vs. bear") is a viral social media debate and thought experiment in which women consider whether they would prefer to be alone in the woods with either a strange man or a bear. The meme originates from a TikTok video by Screenshot HQ posted in April 2024.

== Background ==
The debate originated from a TikTok video published by Screenshot HQ in April 2024 which interviewed eight women asking the question "Would you rather be stuck in a forest with a man or a bear?", with seven of them picking the bear. The post went viral and gained over 16 million views in two months.

== Response ==
=== Online reception ===
Most women responded to the debate saying they would always choose the bear. One of the main reasons they chose this answer was the rate of male violence, especially sexual violence, against women. Other popular arguments included that bears are unable to commit acts worse than murder, that they are more predictable, that they do not enjoy killing, that they are more likely to see a woman as a human being, and that a woman who claims to have been unjustifiably attacked by a bear is more likely to be believed than a woman who claims to have been unjustifiably attacked by a man.

When posed the same question, some men also chose the bear, especially if it was their daughter encountering a man or bear. Many men also negatively responded to the common choice of the bear among women.

Later in July, the influencer Amanda Wylie shared a video to TikTok about her encounter with a bear in the woods in Montana. She compared it to the "man or bear" debate, saying she would still "choose the bear".

=== Commentary from journalists ===
Some journalists compared the response of women sharing their assault experiences online with the #MeToo movement. Femi Oluwole of The Independent argued that the debate showed that men need to be more informed about the dangers women face in society. Journalists highlighted various murder cases such as those of Grace Millane and Junko Furuta.

Rachel Ulatowski of the feminist magazine The Mary Sue called men's backlash to women picking the bear "bizarre" and "laughable" due to weak arguments with misused statistics and claims of misandry. Some journalists compared it to the #NotAllMen argument. Clarissa-Jan Lim of MSNBC argued that discussion focusing on the actual hostility of bears misses the point, which she said was the "dangers that women experience in [a] world" with men.

The World Health Organization states that one in three women face sexual or physical violence in their lifetime. In contrast, there have been 664 bear attacks over fifteen years with most being non-fatal, which means bear attacks are far less common. Bear expert Jean-Jacques Camarra says that bears have evolved to fear humans, and would therefore most likely run away. Wilfred Reilly of the National Review criticized the bear-favoring statistics people shared as an example of the base rate fallacy that he stated was widespread in modern American politics. Megan McArdle of The Washington Post argued that those statistics were a confusion of the inverse fallacy that "reinforce harmful stereotypes" of women being "irrational, neurotic and bad at math".

Kayleigh Donaldson of Paste associated the novel Bear (1976) by Marian Engel with the debate. According to Tamlyn Avery of The Conversation, Julia Phillips's 2024 book Bear alludes to the debate during a scene with the main character Sam at a family funeral.

== See also ==
- 100 men versus a gorilla
- "The Lady, or the Tiger?"
