= Charging Bull =

Bronze sculpture in Manhattan, New York

- The sculpture in 2020
- Artist: Arturo Di Modica
- Year: 1989
- Medium: Bronze
- Dimensions: 11 ft × 16 ft (340 cm × 490 cm)
- Weight: 7,100 pounds (3,200 kg)
- Location: New York City, New York, US; 40.705576°N 74.013421°W
- Owner: Joe Lewis
- Website: https://arturodimodica.com/

Charging Bull (sometimes referred to as the Bull of Wall Street or the Bowling Green Bull) is a bronze sculpture that stands on Broadway just north of Bowling Green in the Financial District of Manhattan in New York City. The 7,100-pound (3,200 kg) bronze sculpture, standing 11 feet (3.4 m) tall and measuring 16 feet (4.9 m) long, depicts a bull, the symbol of financial optimism and prosperity. Charging Bull is a popular tourist destination that draws thousands of people a day, symbolizing Wall Street and the Financial District.

The sculpture was created by Italian artist Arturo Di Modica in the wake of the 1987 Black Monday stock market crash. Late in the evening of Thursday, December 14, 1989, Di Modica arrived on Wall Street with Charging Bull on the back of a truck and illegally dropped the sculpture outside of the New York Stock Exchange Building. After being removed by the New York City Police Department later that day, Charging Bull was installed at Bowling Green on December 20, 1989. Despite initially having only a temporary permit to be located at Bowling Green, Charging Bull became a popular tourist attraction. Di Modica may have been influenced by a pair of huge metallic sculptures, a charging bull and a bear, placed in front of the Frankfurt Stock Exchange in 1985 as part of the 400th anniversary celebration of the exchange.

Following the success of the original sculpture, Di Modica created a number of variations of the Charging Bull which have been sold to private collectors. Charging Bull has been a subject of criticism from an anti-capitalist perspective, such as in the Occupy Wall Street protests of 2011, and has also been compared to the biblical golden calf worshiped by the Israelites shortly after their exodus from Egypt.

== Description ==
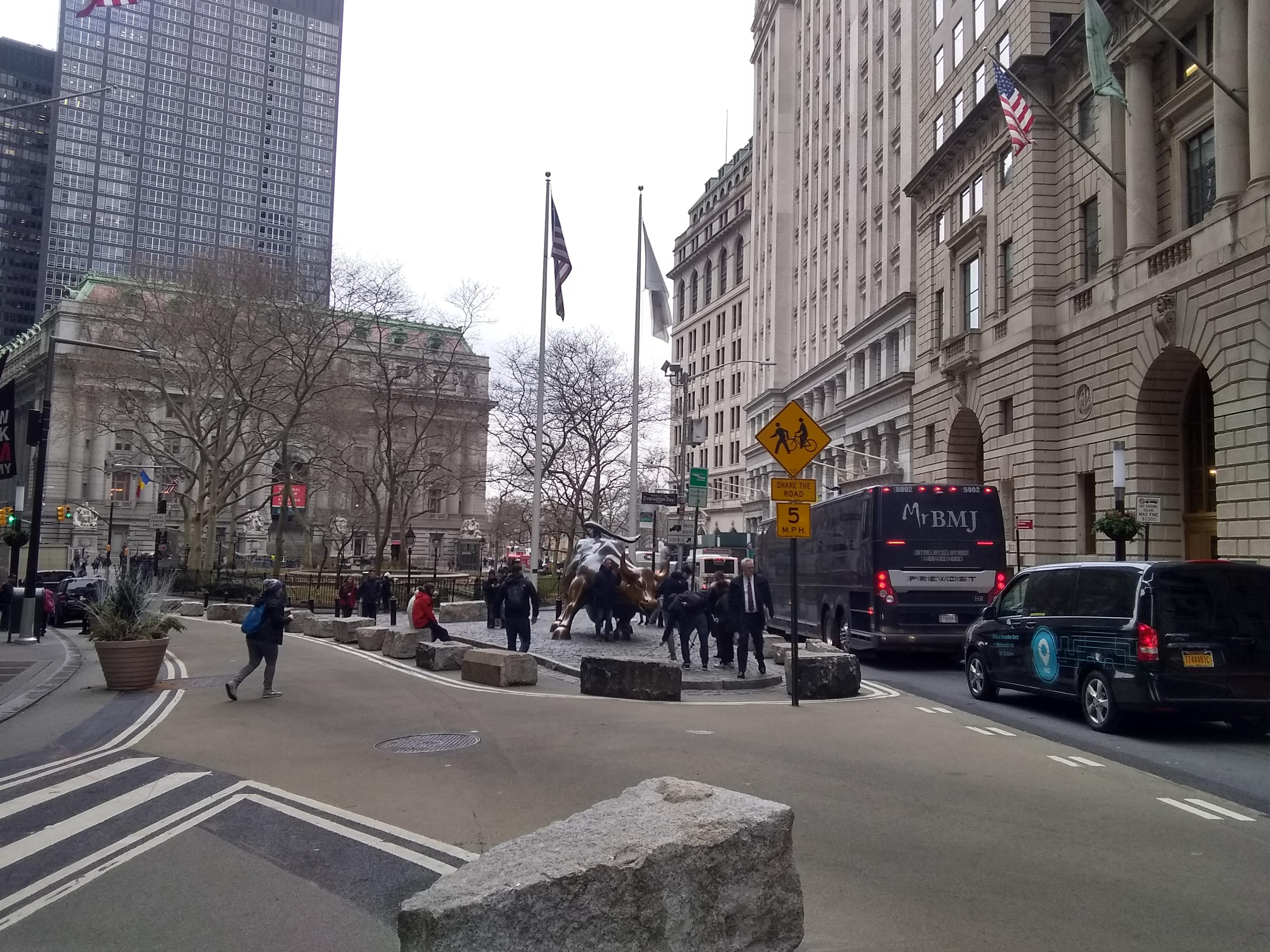
Charging Bull is at the northern tip of Bowling Green.

The 7,100-pound (3,200 kg) sculpture is in a cobblestone-paved traffic median of Broadway just north of Bowling Green. The sculpture is adjacent to 26 Broadway to the east and 25 Broadway to the west. It stands 11 feet (3.4 m) tall and measures 16 feet (4.9 m) long. It depicts a bull, the symbol of financial optimism and prosperity, leaning back on its haunches and with its head lowered as if ready to charge. The sculpture is both a popular tourist destination, which draws thousands of people a day, as well as a symbol of Wall Street and the Financial District, being described as "one of the most iconic images of New York" and a "Wall Street icon." Children also frequently climb the sculpture.

In Outdoor Monuments of Manhattan: A Historical Guide, Dianne Durante describes the sculpture:

The Bull's head is lowered, its nostrils flare, and its wickedly long, sharp horns are ready to gore; it's an angry, dangerous beast. The muscular body twists to one side, and the tail is curved like a lash: the Bull is also energetic and in motion.

The bronze color and hard, metallic texture of the sculpture's surface emphasize the brute force of the creature. The work was designed and placed so that viewers could walk around it, which also suggests the creature's own movement is unrestricted — a point reinforced by the twisting posture of the bull's body, according to Durante.

Charging Bull, then, shows an aggressive or even belligerent force on the move, but unpredictably...[I]t's not far-fetched to say the theme is the energy, strength, and unpredictability of the stock market.

Di Modica told the New York Daily News in 1998:

That bull is one of an edition of five...I'm hoping the other four will be going to cities all over the world, whenever somebody buys them.

== History ==
=== Construction and installation ===
The bull was cast by the Bedi-Makky Art Foundry in Greenpoint, Brooklyn. Di Modica spent $360,000 to create, cast, and install the sculpture following the 1987 stock market crash. The sculpture was Di Modica's idea. Having arrived penniless in the United States in 1970, Di Modica felt indebted to the nation for welcoming him and enabling his career as a successful sculptor. Charging Bull was intended to inspire each person who came into contact with it to carry on fighting through the hard times after the 1987 stock market crash. Di Modica later recounted to art writer Anthony Haden-Guest, "My point was to show people that if you want to do something in a moment things are very bad, you can do it. You can do it by yourself. My point was that you must be strong."

Another artist, Domenico Ranieri, enlarged the model of the bull and worked with Di Modica to bring out the fine points of the sculpture. In an act of guerrilla art, Bedi-Makky Art Foundry and Di Modica trucked it to Lower Manhattan. Late in the evening of December 14, 1989, they installed it beneath a 60-foot (18 m) Christmas tree in the middle of Broad Street in front of the New York Stock Exchange Building as a Christmas gift to New Yorkers. That day, hundreds of onlookers stopped to see it as Di Modica handed out copies of a flier about his artwork.

NYSE officials called police later that day, and the NYPD seized the sculpture and placed it into an impound lot. The ensuing public outcry led the New York City Department of Parks and Recreation to reinstall it two blocks south of the Exchange, in Bowling Green, facing up Broadway just north of Whitehall Street. Charging Bull was rededicated at its new location with a ceremony on December 21, 1989.

=== Ownership ===
The sculpture has a temporary permit allowing it to stand on city property since the city does not own the sculpture, but the temporary permission has lasted since 1989, when city officials said the new location would not be permanent. Art on loan is usually limited to a year's display, and although the city does not buy art, it does accept donations. By 1993, Di Modica wanted to sell the statue to recover the $320,000 cost of manufacturing it. However, there was only one major bid for the statue: a hotel in Las Vegas that offered $300,000.

A writer in the New York Daily News wrote in 1998 that the statue's placement was "beginning to look a mite permanent." According to an article in Art Monthly, Di Modica, as well as officials and New Yorkers, "view it as a permanent feature of Lower Manhattan." In 2004, Di Modica announced that Charging Bull was for sale, on condition the buyer did not move it from its location. Joe Lewis, the British billionaire and ex-owner of Christie's, purchased the sculpture, but claimed in 2026 that he does not own the version located on Bowling Green; the actual owner of the statue is unclear.

Di Modica continued to own the artistic copyright to the statue, and filed several lawsuits against firms making replicas. For instance, Di Modica sued Wal-Mart and other companies in 2006 for selling replicas of the bull and using it in advertising campaigns. Three years later, Di Modica sued Random House for using a photo of the bull on the cover of a book discussing the collapse of financial services firm Lehman Brothers.

=== Evolution into tourist attraction ===
`As soon as the sculpture was set up at Bowling Green, it became "an instant hit." One of the city's most photographed artworks, it has become a tourist destination in the Financial District. "Its popularity is beyond doubt," an article in The New York Times said of the artwork. "Visitors constantly pose for pictures around it." Henry J. Stern, the city parks commissioner when the statue first appeared in the Financial District, said in 1993: "People are crazy about the bull. It captured their imagination." Adrian Benepe, a later New York City parks commissioner, said in 2004, "It's become one of the most visited, most photographed and perhaps most loved and recognized statues in the city of New York. I would say it's right up there with the Statue of Liberty." A 2003 Bollywood film, Kal Ho Naa Ho, featured Charging Bull in a musical number, one visitor told a reporter that the bull's appearance in the film was a reason for his visit to New York City. Despite the 2008 financial crisis, Charging Bull remained a popular tourist attraction.

The Charging Bull's scrotum is noticeably lighter in color due to frequent rubbing.

In addition to having their pictures taken at the front end of the bull, many tourists pose at the back of the bull, near the large testicles "for snapshots under an unmistakable symbol of its virility." According to a 2002 article in The Washington Post, "People on The Street say you've got to rub the nose, horns and testicles of the bull for good luck, tour guide Wayne McLeod would tell the group on the Baltimore bus, who would giddily oblige." A 2004 article in The New York Times said, "Passers-by have rubbed—to a bright gleam—its nose, horns and a part of its anatomy that, as Mr. Benepe put it gingerly, 'separates the bull from the steer.'" A 2007 newspaper account agreed that a "peculiar ritual" of handling the "shining orbs" of the statue's scrotum seems to have developed into a tradition.

In November 2019, city officials announced that they wished to move Charging Bull to a plaza outside the New York Stock Exchange due to safety concerns at Bowling Green. Officials stated that because Charging Bull is located on a traffic median with large crowds, it was vulnerable to terrorist attacks, citing examples such as the 2017 truck attack on the nearby West Side Highway. Local community group Downtown Alliance supported the relocation, but Di Modica opposed it. The New York City Department of Transportation (DOT) had filed an application with the New York City Public Design Commission (PDC) to relocate Charging Bull, but subsequently withdrew the application, which a city spokesperson said was due to uncertainty over the new location. Residents of Manhattan Community District 1, which includes the Financial District, expressed opposition to the relocation in a meeting with city officials in May 2020. At the time, updated plans called for Charging Bull to be located at the corner of Broad Street and Wall Street, north of Fearless Girl. The PDC declined to endorse relocation in June 2020.

=== Other sculptures ===
On March 7, 2017, a bronze sculpture by Kristen Visbal, Fearless Girl, was installed facing Charging Bull. It was commissioned to advertise for an index fund that comprises gender-diverse companies that have a relatively high percentage of women among their senior leadership and installed in anticipation of International Women's Day the following day. It depicts a girl four-foot (1.2 m) high, promoting female empowerment. It was removed in November 2018 and relocated to outside the New York Stock Exchange. A plaque with footprints was placed on the original site of Fearless Girl.

On October 18, 2021, a statue of Harambe, a gorilla, was placed facing the statue in a similar manner to Fearless Girl and thousands of bananas were put under the bull's feet. The act was carried out by organizers promoting Sapien.Network, an in-development social media network.

In fall 2021, artist Nelson Saiers placed a series of sculptures next to the Bull to comment on the Federal Reserve's monetary policy and inflation. The first, "Cheap Money is Out of Order," featured a gumball machine filled with $10 bills offered for 25 cents with an "Out of Order!" sign taped to its face.

== Replicas ==
In 2010, a similar Charging Bull sculpture by Di Modica was installed in Shanghai on commission by the Shanghai city authority; it is informally called the Bund Bull. Two years later, Di Modica unofficially installed another Charging Bull sculpture outside the Amsterdam Stock Exchange on Beursplein, Amsterdam.

In 2019, Professional Bull Riders authorized Di Modica to craft a scaled replica of Charging Bull as the trophy for the champion of their annual Monster Energy PBR Unleash the Beast bull riding major event, the Monster Energy Buck Off at the Garden major. It was first presented during the 2020 event to João Ricardo Vieira.

=== Art market ===
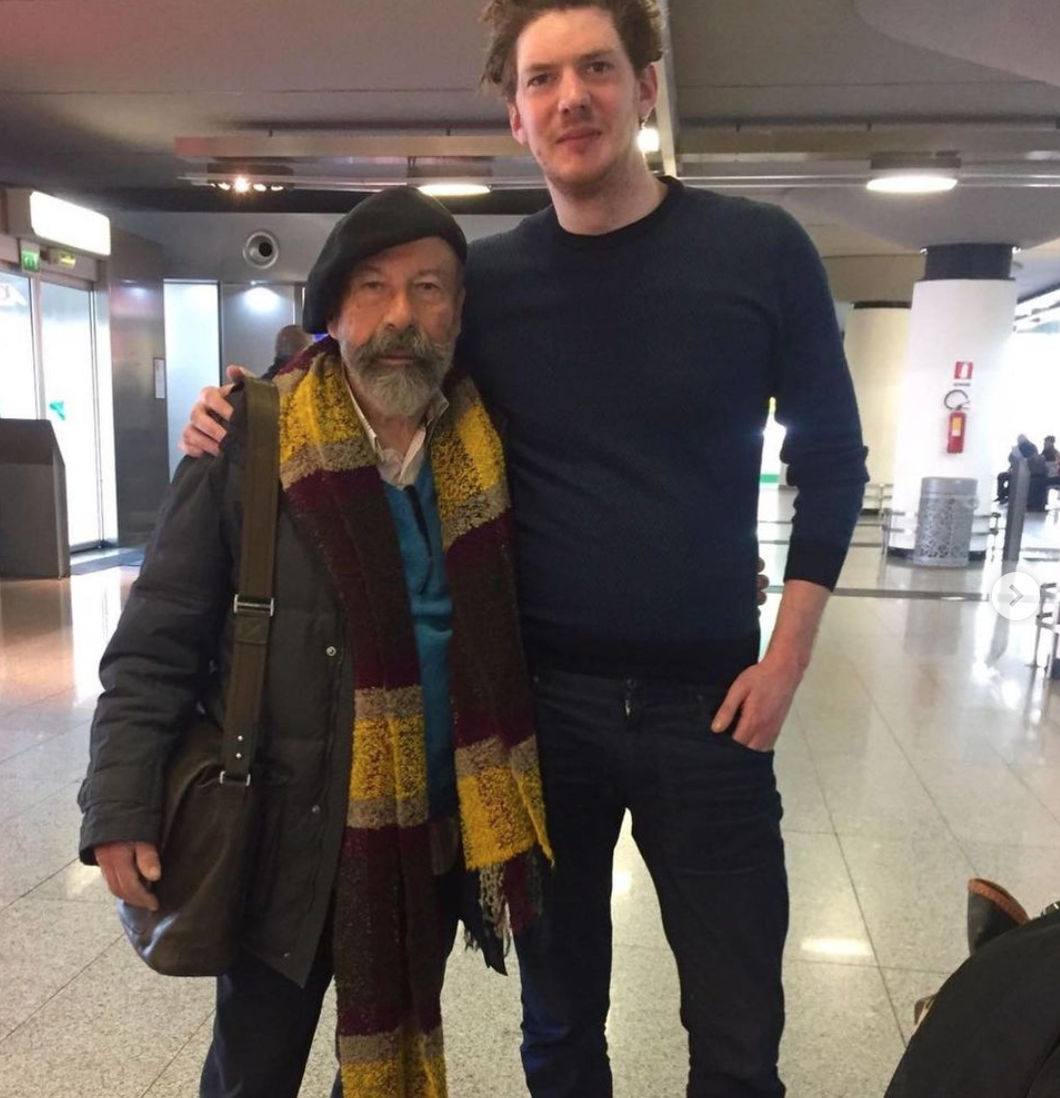
Arturo Di Modica and his representative Jacob Harmer in Sicily, Italy, in 2017

Di Modica worked the majority of his career alone, from his SoHo studio without representation. By the 1990s, Di Modica's artwork had achieved global icon status, but he continued to work outside of the formal art market. By 2000 he had built up a roster of wealthy private collectors. He ate in Cipriani Downtown most days whilst in New York where he met new clients and entertained his existing ones.

Di Modica put the original 16 ft Charging Bull on the market in 2004 with an asking price of $5m. Joe Lewis, the British billionaire and ex-owner of Christies, later purchased the sculpture on the condition that he never move it from Bowling Green. Lewis also purchased the rest of the 16 ft edition which he installed on his various golf courses. In 2012, Di Modica met the London-based art dealer, Jacob Harmer, and shortly afterwards entered into his first formal representation agreement with Harmer's dealership, Geist, based on Mount Street, Mayfair. From 2013, Harmer began documenting the life of the artist, commissioning new sculptures, buying back historical works and building a global market.

In October 2018, the first major work by Modica came to auction, a 6 ft polished bronze version of Charging Bull at Phillips London which was the first in an edition of eight and marked "1987–89". The sculpture sold for £309,000 ($405,000). In March 2019, a stainless steel version of Charging Bull came to auction at Sotheby's New York and despite being in poor condition, sold for $275,000. In Arturo Di Modica: The Last Modern Master, his representative confirms selling 4 ft sculptures for up to $496,000.

== Criticism ==
A poster showing a ballerina on the Charging Bull to promote the Occupy Wall Street movement

Charging Bull has often been a subject of criticism from an anti-capitalist perspective. The Occupy Wall Street protests used the statue as a symbolic figure around which to direct their critiques of corporate greed. A 2011 image from Adbusters portraying a dancer posed in an attitude position atop the sculpture was used to promote the forthcoming protests. The first gathering of Occupy took place around the sculpture on September 17, 2011, before moving to Zuccotti Park. Because of the protests, the bull was surrounded by barricades and guarded by police until 2014.

Charging Bull has been likened to the golden calf worshiped by the Israelites during their Exodus from Egypt. During Occupy Wall Street on multiple occasions an interfaith group of religious leaders led a procession of a golden calf figure that was modeled on the bull. A large papier-mâché piñata made by Sebastian Errazuriz for a 2014 New York design festival was intended to be reminiscent of both the golden calf and Charging Bull. Further comparisons to the golden calf have been made by Jewish and Christian religious commentators.

== Vandalism ==
As a prominent symbol of Wall Street and capitalism generally, Charging Bull has been the frequent target of vandalism, particularly as an act of civil disobedience. Shortly after the bankruptcy of Lehman Brothers during the 2008 financial crisis, the bull's scrotum was painted as Blue balls. Leading up to a protest on May 12, 2011, the bull was tagged in at least two locations, once again including the scrotum, with the Anarchist "circle-A" iconography, prompting the New York City Police Department to temporarily install barricades around the sculpture. The barriers returned that fall during the Occupy Wall Street protests, and remained in place until March 25, 2014, despite a unanimous resolution from the local community board saying they constituted a hazard to pedestrians.

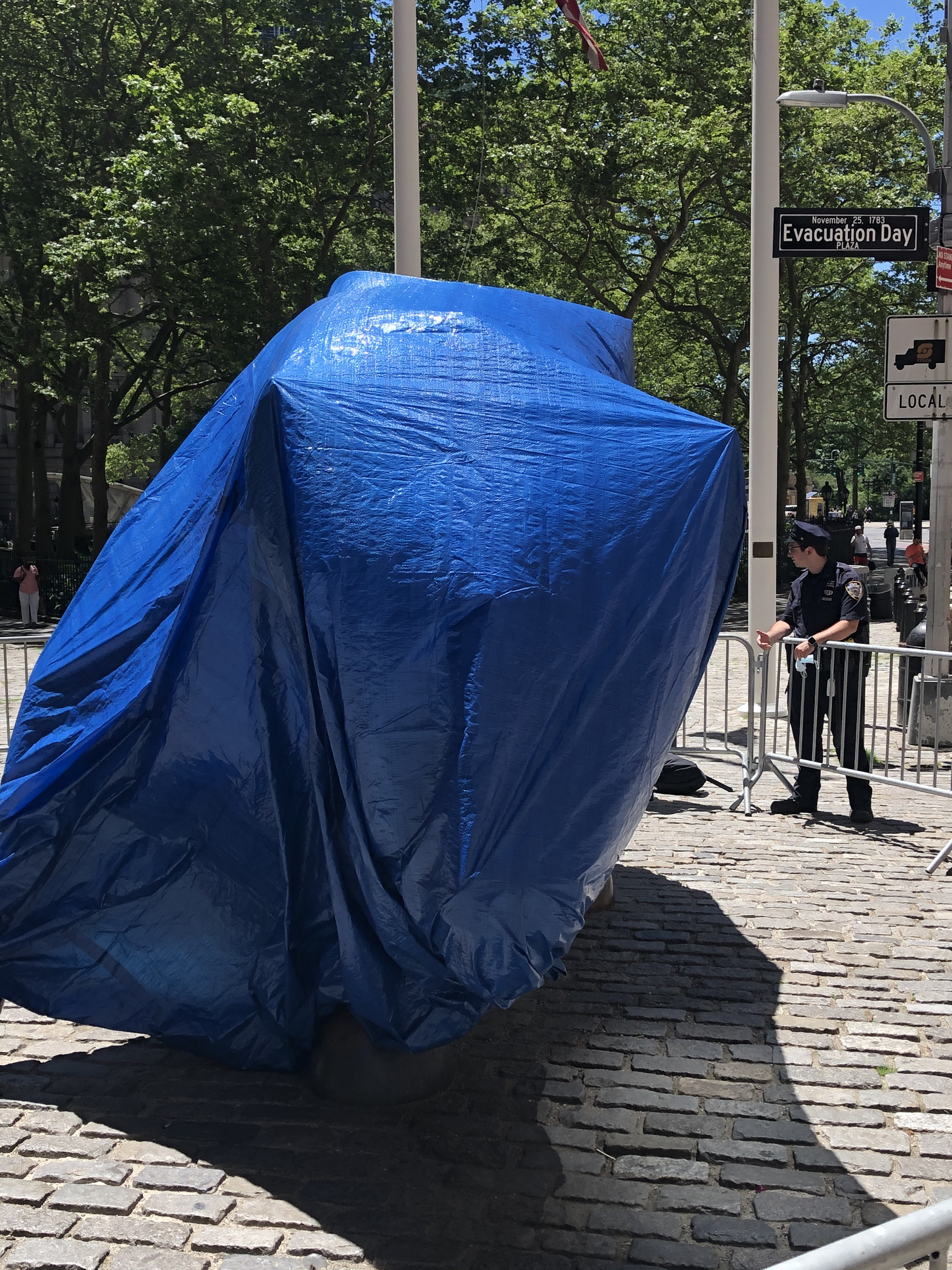
Charging Bull covered in a blue tarp and surrounded by barricades in June 2020 during the George Floyd protests in New York City

On September 14, 2017, three months after U.S. president Donald Trump formally announced the United States' withdrawal from the Paris Agreement on climate change, an artist attempting to highlight U.S. popular support for the accord doused the head of the sculpture in a blue pigment.

In 2019, Charging Bull was vandalized twice. On September 7, a man from Dallas struck the sculpture with a banjo, leaving a sizable dent in the horn. Professional Bull Riders donated money from its ticket sales to pay for fixes to the horn, and Di Modica personally came to the site the following month to repair his creation. Then, on October 7, activists from Extinction Rebellion hurled fake blood over the sculpture and staged a die-in on the surrounding traffic plaza. In June 2020, Charging Bull was covered in a tarp and monitored by police to protect it from vandalism attempts during the George Floyd protests in New York City.

== In popular culture ==
The history of the sculpture and its sculptor was presented in the 2014 Italian documentary film Il Toro di Wall Street, released internationally as The Charging Bull. In Mr. Robot, Darlene Alderson (Carly Chaikin) is shown castrating the statue.

Charging Bull has featured in several films set in Manhattan, including The Big Short, The Wolf of Wall Street, and Hitch. The statue appears in the 2011 remake of Arthur in which Russell Brand and Luis Guzman respectively as Arthur and his butler crash into it with a Batmobile while dressed as Batman and Robin handing the bovine a giant severance package. In The Sorcerer's Apprentice (2010), the sculpture comes alive and chases Nicolas Cage's character down Broadway. The sculpture can be seen floating through space at the end of Don't Look Up (2021) after presumably being blown into orbit by the comet's impact.

== See also ==
- Market sentiment
- Big Bull, India – a similar sculpture originally located inside the Bombay Stock Exchange, Mumbai
- The Pasture – a set of grazing cattle sculptures located within Toronto's Financial District
- Bust of Edward Snowden – another example of New York guerrilla art
- Art in Odd Places festival
- CowParade
- Qilin – ancient Chinese symbol of prosperity
