= 100 men versus a gorilla =

Thought experiment and Internet meme

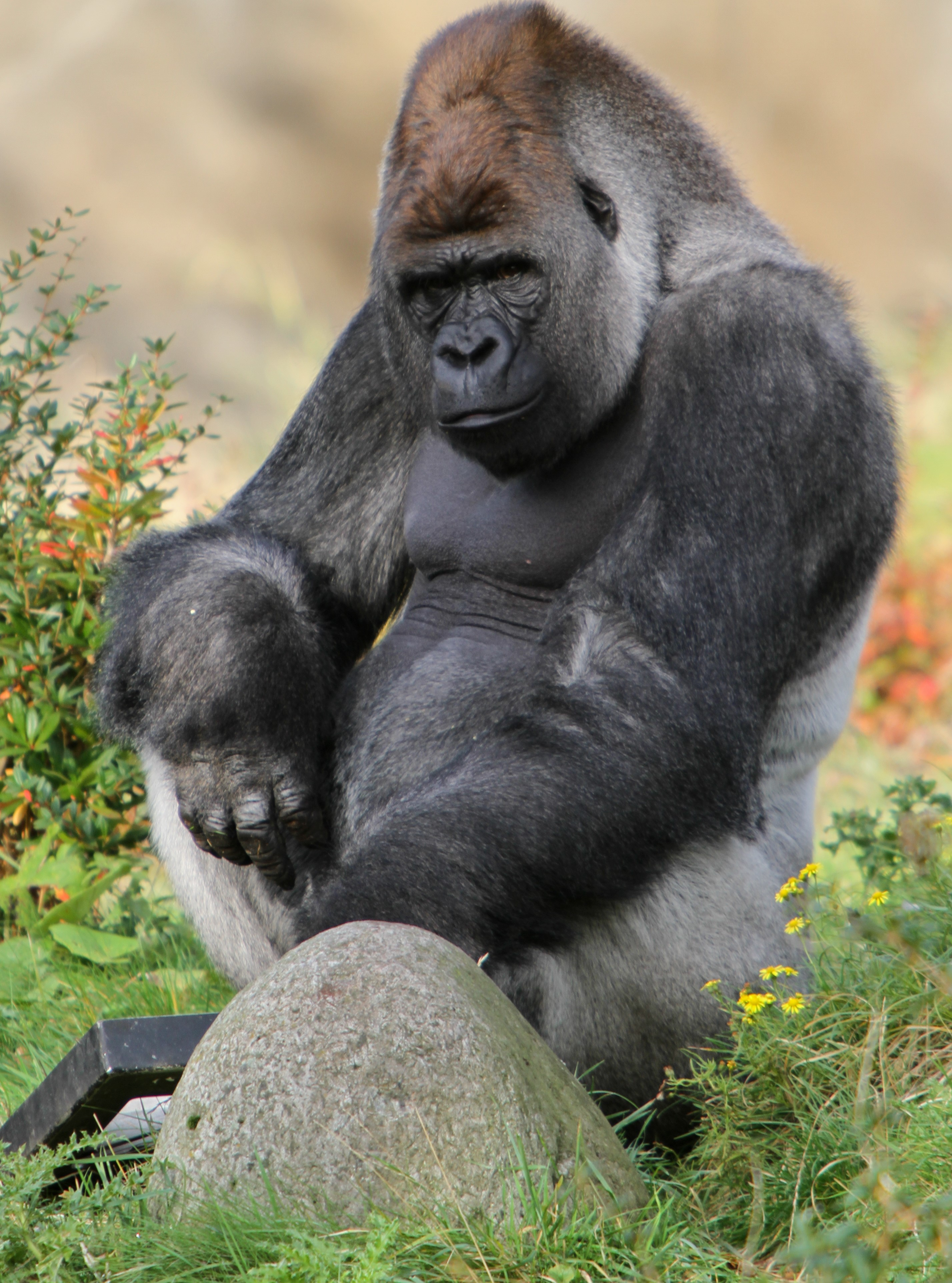
Bokito, a male silverback western gorilla

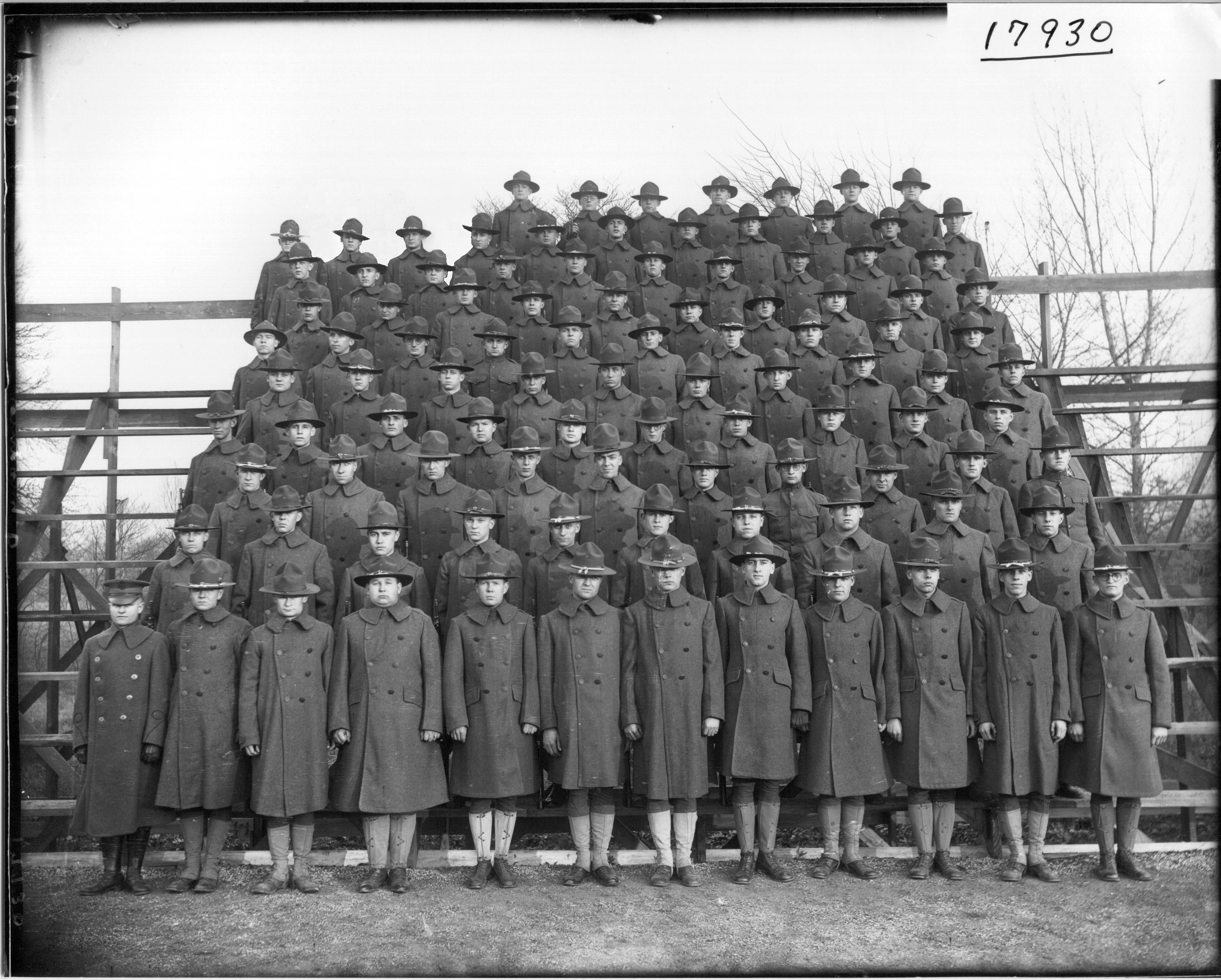
100 men in military training at Miami University, January 1919 (Note: This photo is digitally altered; there are 103 men in the original image.)

"100 men versus a gorilla" is a satirical thought experiment originating from the Internet concerning the winner of a hypothetical battle between one hundred male humans and a silverback gorilla. It typically assumes that the men are unarmed. First recorded in a Reddit post in 2020, it inspired internet memes upon gaining newfound popularity in 2025.

== History ==
The question's first known appearance was on the subreddit r/whowouldwin in a 2020 post by u/probablycashed. The question went viral on TikTok in 2022. In April 2025, the question went viral again on Twitter, and then spread to Facebook and YouTube.

== Scientific assessment ==
Tara Stoinski, president of the Dian Fossey Gorilla Fund, said that people often overestimate the power of gorillas, saying that despite gorillas having strong muscles and jaws, these traits are used more for protection than a hunting attack. She thought that a large group of humans could use their ability to cooperate and coordinate, taking turns to attack, to "prolong a battle that could eventually wear a gorilla out". Primatologist Michelle Rodrigues agreed that gorillas are "not typically aggressive" and "pick their battles", and that in this situation a gorilla would try to flee.

Ron Magill, communications director of Zoo Miami, believed that human attackers could win by "working together to envelop the gorilla and create a human straightjacket", but would suffer some deaths and serious injuries from concussion, bite wounds and broken necks. Primatologist Cat Hobaiter argued that if the human attackers were prevented from rushing the gorilla simultaneously and were required to attack one by one, they "wouldn't stand a chance".

== Reception ==
The hypothetical question has received attention from popular news organizations and celebrities. Montana senator Tim Sheehy stated in a Twitter video that he thought the men would "clearly win", although suffering "a high casualty rate".

On 1 May 2025, the official White House Twitter account referenced the debate in a tweet with the following: "100 men vs 1 gorilla is still up for debate. Meanwhile, 142,000+ illegal alien criminals went up against 1 President Trump — They all got deported.🤭" accompanied with an AI-generated picture of many illegal immigrants boarding a plane, referencing Trump's immigration policies.

The conservationist Robert Irwin responded that people should be working out how many people are needed to protect an endangered species. Dian Fossey Gorilla Fund International representatives hoped that the meme would spark interest in gorilla conservation efforts.

Jake Paul posted an Instagram video of himself with a gorilla in the background. In the video, Paul declared that "it's time to end the debate", implying he wanted to fight the gorilla. His post resulted in ridicule, with many commentors saying Paul could not take on one gorilla. One user stated that Paul should "come back later when the gorilla retires," referring to Paul's 2024 boxing match against Mike Tyson.

The YouTube personality MrBeast posted a joke tweet asking for 100 male volunteers to take on the hypothetical challenge of fighting a gorilla. This tweet received over 17 million views and sparked widespread discussion on social media platforms. Elon Musk's response to MrBeast's tweet was "Sure, what's the worst that could happen?" Animal rights organization PETA criticized MrBeast for the tweet, suggesting that he should leave animals out of his content.

=== In video games ===
Blizzard Entertainment announced a special livestream of the video game Overwatch 2 for 6 May 2025, in which 100 Soldier 76es would fight the gorilla character Winston.

Scott Duwe, a staff writer at Destructoid, asked editors and writers if 100 Marios could beat one Donkey Kong. Some thought Donkey Kong would easily charge and beat many of the Marios, while some interviewed thought the Marios would win.

== See also ==
- Harambe, a silverback gorilla that also became the subject of Internet memes
- Man or bear, another Internet thought experiment
