= MV Harambee =

History
- Name: Reg IV (ordered); Belgrano (1952–65); Santa Barbara (1965–66); Harambee (1966–79); Arambee (1979–80)
- Owner: Rudolf A. Oetker, Hamburg (1953–66); Eastern Africa National Shipping Line (1966–79); Silverstar Corporation, Panama (1979–80)
- Ordered: 1952
- Builder: Lübecker Flenderwerke AG, Lübeck
- Yard number: 435
- Launched: 27 August 1953
- Completed: 21 October 1953
- Identification: IMO 5039599
- Fate: Scrapped in 1980

General characteristics
- Type: General cargo ship
- Tonnage: 6,169 GT; 3,776 NT; 10,178 DWT
- Length: 482 ft (147 m) LOA
- Beam: 59 ft 9 in (18.21 m)
- Draught: 25 ft 2 in (7.67 m)
- Propulsion: 6-cylinder M.A.N. oil engine; 4,000 b.h.p.
- Speed: 13 kn (15 mph; 24 km/h)
- Endurance: 678 tons of oil
- Capacity: 596 cub. grain; 533,181 cub. ft., bale
- Complement: 8 passengers; 33 crew

MV Harambee was a German-built general cargo ship, initially ordered as the Reg IV. Bought while under construction by a different company, she was launched in 1953 and served with the German Merchant Navy under the name Belgrano, making voyages to South America until 1966. She was sold to an African company, renamed Harambee, and served for another thirteen years, before being sold once more, renamed Arambee, and scrapped in Taiwan shortly afterwards.

== Construction and early career ==
Harambee was initially planned as the Reg IV, ordered from Lübecker Flender-Werke, Lübeck, by Rohstoff Einfuhr Gesellschaft and laid down as yard No 435.

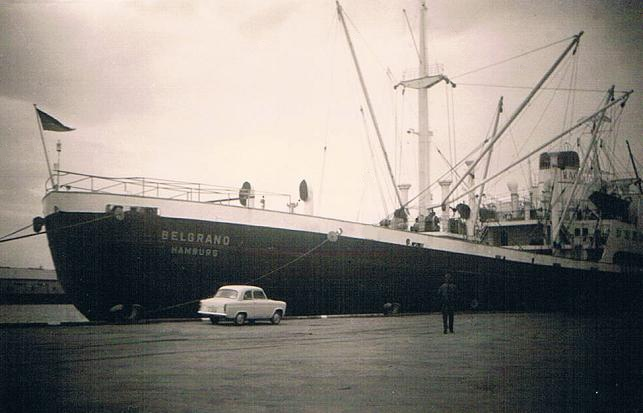
MV Belgrano at Port Adelaide in November 1959

She was bought while still under construction by Rudolf A. Oetker, Hamburg and completed for the company under the name Belgrano. She was launched on 27 August 1953 and delivered to the company on 21 October that year. With a tonnage of 6,169 GT, 3,776 NT she was 482 ft (147 m) long overall, with a beam of 59 ft 9 in (18.21 m) and a draught of 25 ft 2 in (7.67 m). Equipped with a 6-cylinder M.A.N. oil engine capable of 4,000 b.h.p., she could achieve a speed of 13 kn (15 mph; 24 km/h). Manned with a crew of thirty-three, she also had accommodation for eight passengers.

Belgrano spent most of her career sailing for Hamburg-Südamerikanische Dampfschifffahrts-Gesellschaft (Hamburg-Süd) between Hamburg and South American ports, but was also used for tramping services. She was renamed Santa Barbara in September 1965.

== African career and disposal ==
On 8 December 1966 was sold by Hamburg-Süd to the Eastern Africa National Shipping Line Ltd. (Southern Line Ltd, managers), based in Mombasa and owned jointly by the Governments of Kenya, Tanzania and Uganda in the East African Community. Her new owners renamed her Harambee, and registered her under the Red Ensign. In 1969 she appeared on a 50 cents postage stamp issued by the Kenya, Uganda, Tanzania postal service. Harambee sailed for thirteen years for the company until being sold to Silverstar Corporation, Panama in August 1979 and renamed Arambee. Her service in this guise was short-lived, she made only one voyage for the company, between Gdynia and Fushiki, and then was sold for scrapping. She sailed to Kaohsiung, Taiwan, arriving on 3 February 1980, and demolition work began on 20 February in the breaking yards of Yih Shen Steel Enterprise Co. Ltd.
