= Arturo Di Modica =

Sicilian sculptor (1941–2021)

- Born: January 26, 1941; Vittoria, Sicily, Italy
- Died: February 19, 2021 (aged 80); Vittoria, Sicily, Italy
- Notable work: Charging Bull (1987–1989)
- Website: https://arturodimodica.com/

Arturo Di Modica (January 26, 1941 – February 19, 2021) was an Italian sculptor, widely known for his Charging Bull sculpture. His figurative art was primarily in the medium of bronze, showing increasing modernist influences as his career progressed.

Henry Moore referred to Di Modica as "the young Michelangelo" in his lifetime.

== Early life ==
Arturo Di Modica was born in Vittoria, a small town in the province of Ragusa, Sicily, on January 26, 1941. His father, Giuseppe, owned a grocery store and his mother, Angela, was a homemaker. Inspired by his surroundings, Di Modica told an interviewer in 2017 that as a child he had liked to hang out at craftsmens' workshops, watching them weaving baskets and carving wooden carts. As his father did not approve of him becoming an artist, Di Modica ran away from home at the age of 18, taking a train to Florence to pursue a career in sculpting.

Upon arrival in Florence, he enrolled in the Accademia di Belle Arti di Firenze and attended courses in the Free School of the Nude for a few years. To support himself, he worked various jobs, including one in the x-ray department of a hospital and one as a mechanic in a local garage. Unable to afford the use of local foundries, he built his own forging and metalworking tools, salvaged materials, and cast bronzes in his home-built foundry.

== Career ==
Di Modica had his first major show of rough abstract bronze castings at Villa Medici in 1968. By the late 1960s, Di Modica had begun working with Carrara marble in Pietrasanta, where he met the prominent English sculptor Henry Moore; he nicknamed Di Modica "the young Michelangelo", In the 1970s, Di Modica moved to New York City on the advice of his teachers, after they observed his frustration with the art world in Florence. Di Modica set up his first studio on Grand Street in SoHo, a neighborhood popular for its emerging bohemian art scene. Here, he became known for leaving large scale marble works on the street outside his studio. It was also at this address that Di Modica found a young graffiti artist, Jean-Michel Basquiat (also known as SAMO), spray painting his studio door.

In 1977, Di Modica held a major exhibition at Battery Park and invited art critic Hilton Kramer to the show. Uninterested, Kramer hung up on Di Modica, prompting Di Modica to illegally drop eight monumental abstract marble sculptures outside Rockefeller Center, blocking Fifth Avenue and drawing the attention of police. Upon hearing about the commotion and interested to meet the artist, Mayor Abe Beame arrived and, after receiving a $25 fine, Di Modica was granted permission to temporarily leave the sculptures on exhibit. This stunt made the front page of the New York Post the next day. All eight sculptures were sold.

Towards the end of the 1970s, Di Modica bought 54 Crosby Street, a vacant lot not far from his first studio. After tearing down the original shack, he built a new building using salvaged materials, completely to his own design and without planning permission. Among the materials he used were seven-meter beams of timber that he attached to himself and dragged back to Crosby Street through the streets at night, as well as 8,000 bricks that he bought for $400 from a priest. He would then go on to add two underground levels, again without the necessary permission, covertly removing the rubble under the cover of darkness. Crosby Street would become his creative center, where he lived, worked and hosted lively art parties and events.

=== Il Cavallo, Lincoln Center (1988) ===
During the 1970s, Di Modica's focus was on abstract sculpture, often balancing opposing materials into a single work. However, this began to change in the early 1980s, when his focus turned to the equine form. A 1984 polished bronze horse on display in Trump Tower was followed by Il Cavallo, an almost 10.5 ft depiction of a horse biting its own tail. On Valentine's Day 1988, Di Modica delivered the sculpture – wrapped in a red sheet with the message "Be my Valentine NY Love AD" – to Lincoln Center on the back of his Ferrari. Di Modica later sold a copy of the work to the Italian designer Roberto Cavalli.

=== Charging Bull (1987–1989) ===
Arturo Di Modica's Charging Bull (1987–1989)

Di Modica conceptualized the Charging Bull sculpture following October 19, 1987, when Black Monday hit American financial markets. He spent the next two years creating the 16 ft bronze in his Crosby Street Studio, financing the $350,000 cost himself, conceiving of it as a symbol of the power of the American economy, which he felt he had benefited from after his move. The sculpture was then cast using a local foundry, after which Di Modica and his colleagues spent the next few nights watching police patrols on Wall Street, in order to move and present the sculpture in a guerrilla manner. Before dawn on December 15, 1989, they arrived, only to find that the city had installed a 40 ft Christmas tree during the day; he simply told the group to "drop the bull under the tree – it's my gift."

Di Modica stayed by the sculpture to greet morning commuters. In 1989, the New York Stock Exchange arranged for the sculpture to be removed. Public demand for the bull's return came to the attention of Parks Commissioner Henry Stern, who arranged for the sculpture's formal installation at Bowling Green on December 20, where it has been since.

While in conversation with art critic and writer Anthony Haden-Guest, Di Modica emphasized that he thought of Charging Bull as a symbol "to show people that if you want to do something in a moment things are very bad, you can do it. You can do it by yourself. My point was that you must be strong."

==== Placement of Kristen Visbal's Fearless Girl (2017) ====
On March 7, 2017, State Street Global Advisors commissioned and installed American sculptor Kristen Visbal's bronze sculpture Fearless Girl, in close range of Charging Bull, to create a dialogue between the two sculptures on the topic of gender representation on corporate boards of directors. Adweek described Fearless Girl, depicting a 4-foot-high (1.2 m) girl standing in a self-confident pose, as "staring down the 28-year-old Wall Street "Charging Bull"".

Di Modica contested the placement, deeming Fearless Girl to be an "advertising trick"; The New York Times described him as being "wounded" by the sculpture's placement, quoting him viewing the placement as being "[her] there attacking the bull", and his attorney Norman Siegel complained that the juxtaposition had "transformed [Charging Bull] into a negative force and a threat."

=== Bund Bull (2010) ===
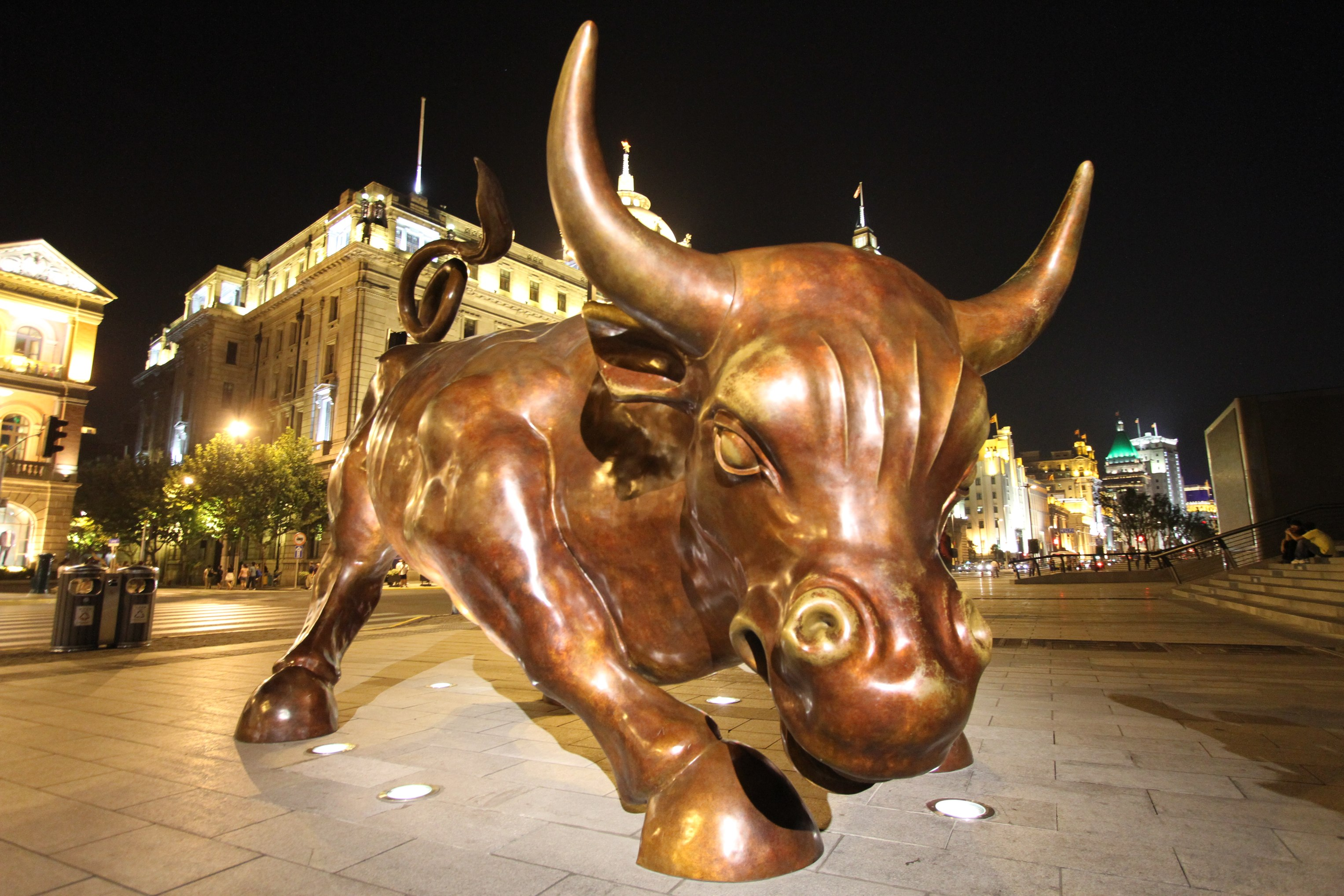
Arturo Di Modica's Bund Bull (2010), Shanghai

Di Modica created the Bund Bull in April 2010, with it being unveiled on The Bund in Shanghai on May 15, 2010. It is 17.1-foot (5.2 m) long and 10.5-foot (3.2 m) tall, and was intended to be a Chinese cultural parallel to Charging Bull. The tone of the bronze in the sculpture is reddish, and the figure of the bull leans to the right.

== Value ==
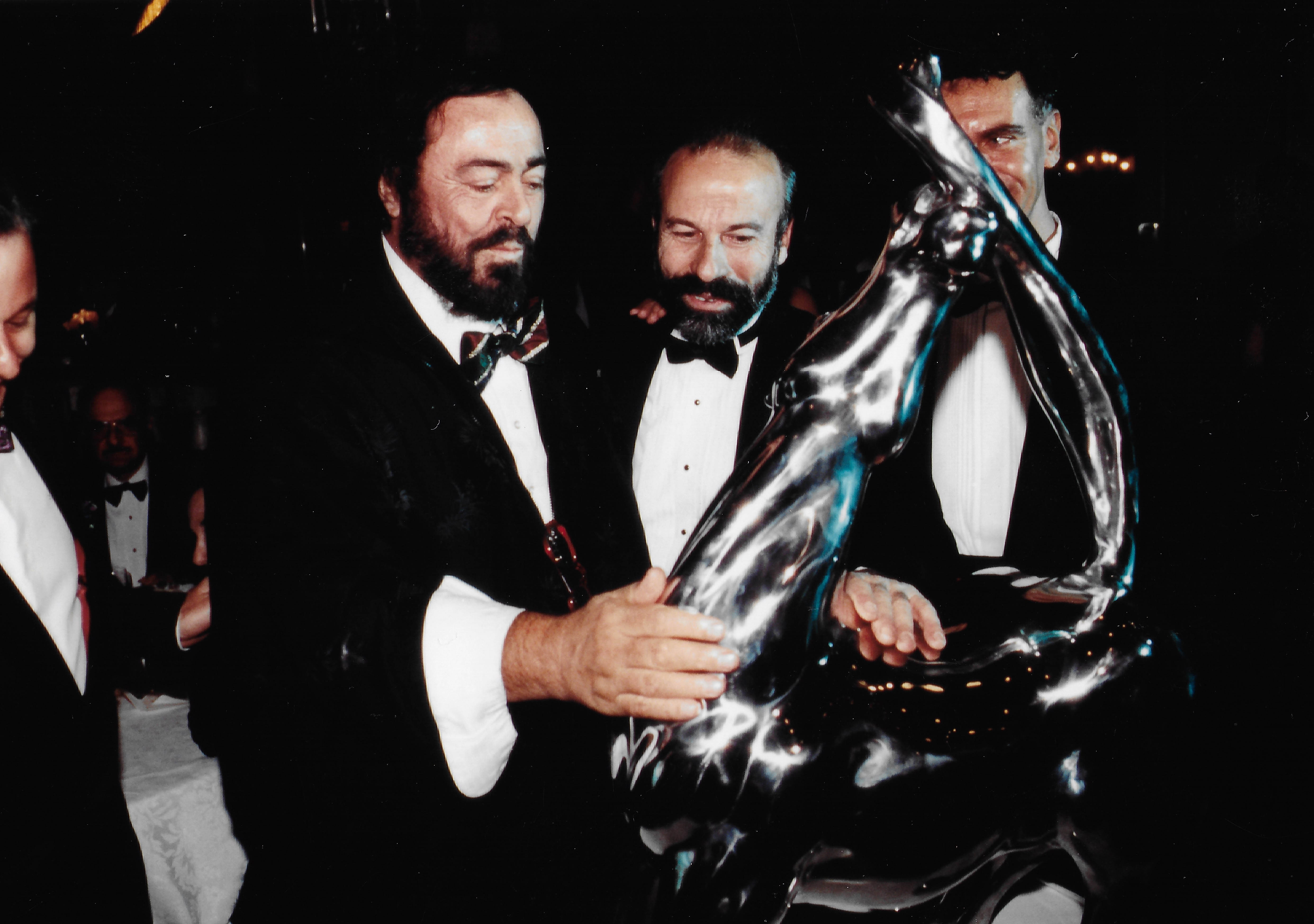
Di Modica and his collector Luciano Pavarotti, 1999

In the mid-2000s British businessman Joe Lewis bought the original Charging Bull statue for an undisclosed sum. A condition of the sale was that the statue stayed at Bowling Green. Lewis also commissioned the remainder of the sculptures within the edition, which had yet to be cast, and they are on display at several of his properties. In 2014, it was reported that Di Modica had been offered $12 million for a 16 ft platinum bull but the deal was never finalized. In October 2018, the first major work by Di Modica went to auction at Phillips London. The 6 ft polished bronze version of Charging Bull was the first in an edition of eight and marked "1987–89". It sold for £309,000 ($405,000). In March 2019, a stainless steel version of Charging Bull went to auction at Sotheby's New York and despite being in poor condition, sold for $275,000. His representative has confirmed that 4 ft sculptures have been sold for up to $496,000 as early as 2013.

== Later life and death ==
In 2004, at the age of 63, Di Modica said: "I have a lot of art to create. I have another 15, 20 years to do something beautiful." Not long after, Di Modica embarked upon two new projects simultaneously: the School of the New Renaissance and Wild Horses. The School of the New Renaissance is a 12-acre sculpture school in his home town of Vittoria. Di Modica believed it would become an international attraction capable of drawing in tourists from all over the world and helping the local economy. Wild Horses was an ambitious project: two 140 ft bronze horses straddling the Ippari River. Shortly before his death and despite his poor health, Di Modica had finished the 40 ft prototype.

== Death ==
Di Modica died from cancer on February 19, 2021, in his birthplace of Vittoria, Sicily. The day of Di Modica's funeral was declared an official day of mourning by Vittoria's municipality.
