= Harambe =

Captive gorilla (1999–2016)

- Still frame from a video showing Harambe holding the 3-year-old boy
- Species: Western lowland gorilla
- Sex: Male
- Born: May 27, 1999; Gladys Porter Zoo, Brownsville, Texas, U.S.
- Died: May 28, 2016 (aged 17); Cincinnati Zoo and Botanical Garden, Cincinnati, Ohio, U.S.
- Cause of death: Gunshot wound
- Known for: Circumstances of death
- Residence: Gladys Porter Zoo (1999–2014); Cincinnati Zoo and Botanical Garden (2014–2016)
- Weight: 440 lb (200 kg)
- Named after: Rita Marley song

Harambe (/hə.ˈrɑːm.beɪ/, hə-RAHM-bay; May 27, 1999 – May 28, 2016) was a western lowland gorilla who lived at the Cincinnati Zoo. On May 28, 2016, a three-year-old boy visiting the zoo climbed under a fence into an outdoor gorilla enclosure where he was grabbed and violently dragged and thrown by Harambe. Fearing for the boy's life, a zoo worker shot and killed Harambe. The incident was recorded on video and received broad international coverage and commentary, including controversy over the choice to use lethal force. Several primatologists and conservationists wrote later that the zoo had no other choice under the circumstances, and that it highlighted the danger of zoo animals near humans and the need for better standards of care.

Harambe became the subject of Internet memes, a statue, songs, and other tributes and recognitions.

== History ==
=== Early life and upbringing ===
Harambe was born at Gladys Porter Zoo in Brownsville, Texas, on May 27, 1999. He was named by Dan Van Coppenolle, a local area counselor who won a naming contest sponsored by the zoo. He came up with the name after listening to the 1988 song "Harambe (Working Together for Freedom)" by Rita Marley, widow of Bob Marley. Harambee is a Swahili term for communal labor.

On January 6, 2002, when Harambe was two years old, his mother, Kayla, his 11-month-old brother, Makoko, and his two-year-old half-sister, Uzuri, died of chlorine gas poisoning after a container of chlorine solution left too close to a space heater released gas into the gorilla enclosure. Harambe was also possibly injured in the accident.

On September 18, 2014, Harambe was transferred to the Cincinnati Zoo and Botanical Garden, to learn adult gorilla behavior and join a new social group.

=== Death ===
On May 28, 2016, a three-year-old boy visiting the Cincinnati Zoo fell into the moat at the Gorilla World habitat.

Witnesses said they heard the child say he wanted to go into the gorilla enclosure. The boy then climbed a 3-foot-tall (0.9 m) fence, crawled through 4 feet (1.2 m) of bushes, and then fell 15 feet (4.6 m) into a moat of shallow water. Zoo officials immediately signaled for the three gorillas in the habitat to return inside, and two females did so. However, the third gorilla, 450-pound (200 kg) male silverback Harambe, climbed down into the moat.

Over the next 10 minutes, Harambe became increasingly "agitated and disoriented" by the screams of onlookers. He carried the child through the water, occasionally propping him up when he sat, or pushing him down when he stood. Harambe exhibited "strutting" behavior—walking around with legs and arms stiffly extended to appear bigger—a bluffing move with inherent danger should Harambe throw or drag the boy around too roughly. Harambe then carried the boy up a ladder out of the moat onto dry land. Afraid for the boy's welfare, zoo officials decided to kill Harambe, doing so with a single rifle shot to the head. Cincinnati firefighters said the boy was between Harambe's legs when the shot was fired.

Harambe was killed one day after his 17th birthday. The boy was given a trauma assessment and transported to Cincinnati Children's Hospital Medical Center; his injuries were non-life-threatening.

== Reactions ==
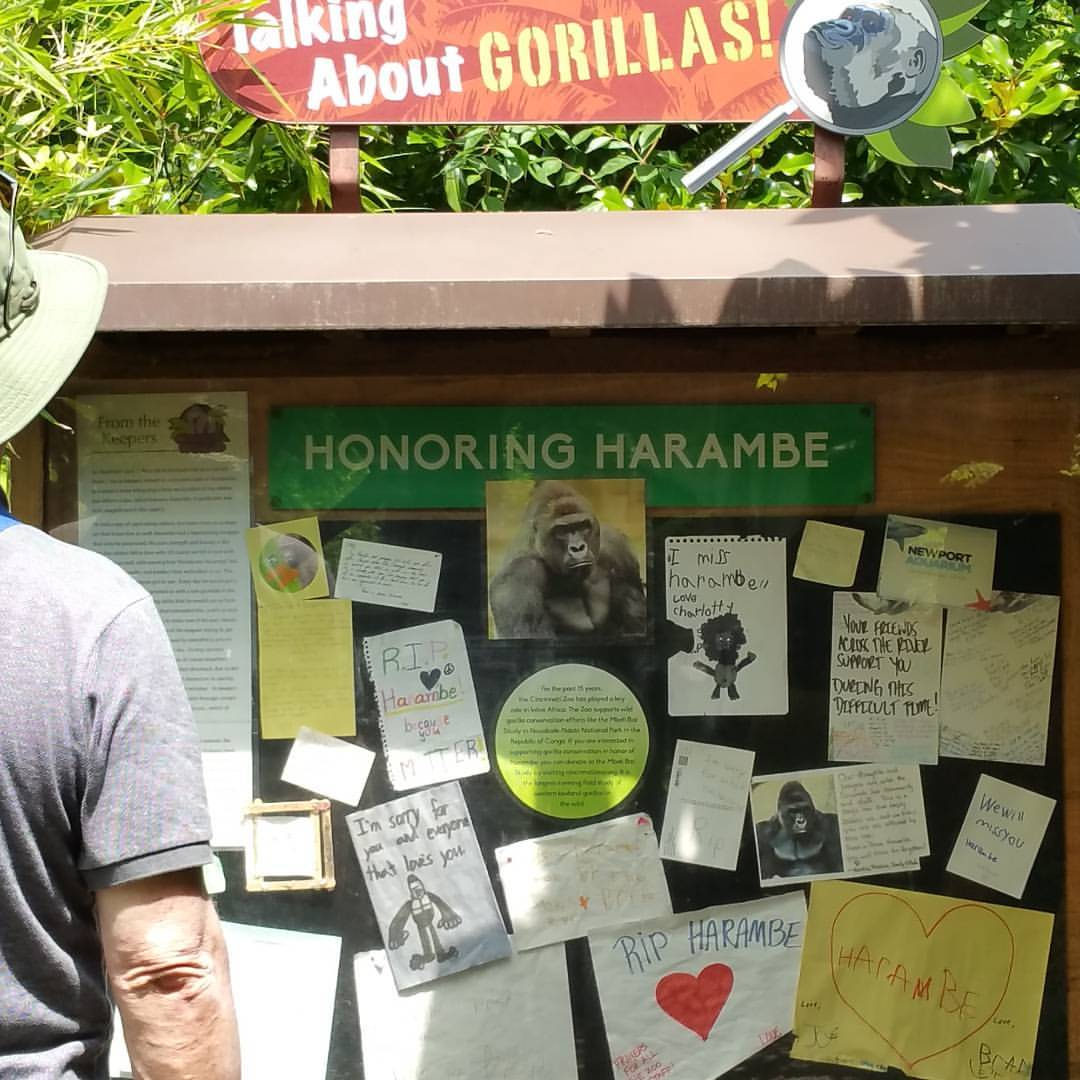
Memorial for Harambe at the Cincinnati Zoo, June 12, 2016

The incident was recorded in a dramatic video by an anonymous bystander and uploaded to YouTube, where it went viral, sparking global publicity and controversy. Some observers said that it was unclear whether Harambe was likely to harm the child. Others called for the boy's parents or the zoo to be held accountable for the gorilla's death. Zoo director Thane Maynard stated, "The child was being dragged around ... His head was banging on concrete. This was not a gentle thing. The child was at risk."

The crowd of onlookers reacted to the situation largely by screaming. Experts assessed that this likely agitated Harambe and motivated him to drag the child away from the perceived threat of the screaming crowd. An onlooker told the screamers to stop, and noted afterward to the Detroit Free Press that "when we got the crowd to stop and be quiet [Harambe] sat still longer, but the minute the volume went up and people really started yelling, the more he felt like he had to get that boy away". An editorial in Outside blamed the screamers for Harambe's death.

Police investigated possible criminal charges against the parents while the parents defended the zoo's actions. The boy's mother also became the target of online shaming. On June 6, 2016, Ohio prosecutor Joe Deters said that the mother would not face any charges of wrongdoing. The zoo was investigated by the Association of Zoos and Aquariums (AZA), which sets the standards for zoos, and the USDA.

Several vigils took place to honor Harambe's death. A candlelight vigil was held at Hyde Park, Cincinnati. Animal rights activist Anthony Seta spoke at a vigil at Cincinnati Zoo, saying: "I'm not here to decide what was right and what was wrong; the fact is that a gorilla who just celebrated his birthday has been killed."

The shooting was criticized by celebrities, including Ricky Gervais, Brian May, and Piers Morgan. Donald Trump defended the actions of the zoo during his 2016 presidential campaign, stating the zoo employees "probably had no choice", although he said "it was almost like a mother holding a baby".

=== Scientists ===
The incident sparked debate among biologists and primatologists on whether gorillas and other primates should be held in captivity at all. Primatologist Jane Goodall said that according to the video it seemed Harambe was trying to protect the child. She gave a longer explanation in an interview with the president of the International Fund for Animal Welfare, concluding that the zoo had no choice but to kill Harambe. She wrote, "It was awful for the child, the parents, Harambe, the zoo, the keepers and the public. But when people come into contact with wild animals, life and death decisions sometimes have to be made." Goodall said, "We will never be able to be 100% sure that people and wildlife won't be injured when they are in such close proximity", and she believed that zoos "with the highest standards of care" could play an important role in the animals' well-being.

Zookeeper Jack Hanna strongly defended the zoo's actions, noting that a tranquilizer dart might have taken five or ten minutes to take effect and would have further aggravated Harambe. Primatologist Frans de Waal said he saw few options for the zoo: "A gorilla is so immensely strong that even with the best of intentions—and we are not sure that Harambe had those—the child's death was a probable outcome." Ian Redmond of the Ape Alliance said other options were not tried, such as showing force to bluster the gorilla to back down, or if someone known and trusted by Harambe had tried to calm him.

Ethologist Gisela Kaplan assessed that Harambe likely would have deemed the child too small to warrant an aggressive reaction, and the scenes of Harambe dragging the child through the enclosure were probably an attempt to protect the child from the perceived threat of the crowd above, who would not stop screaming. She contrasted the incident with the rescue of Levan Merritt from Jambo at the Jersey Zoo in 1986, where the lack of guns in England meant that zookeepers were compelled to let the situation play out until they could extract the child from the enclosure, rather than shooting the gorilla.

== Cultural impact ==
=== Memes ===
Following the killing, Harambe became the subject of multiple viral memes. Vox wrote in November that Harambe has an "undeniable status as 2016's meme of the year." People magazine wrote that "Harambe continues to live on in the collective mind of the internet, entering into a rarefied state of venerated meme status." One of the most widespread memes was noted by The Washington Post and New York magazine who observed a proliferation of over-the-top and fake tributes to Harambe. "The idea is, the more intense and more sincere-seeming the expression of mourning is, the funnier the joke." For example, the "Dicks out for Harambe" meme can be seen as a fake tribute to an incident that would normally engender sincere mourning. Aja Romano of Vox wrote that "If you were a progressive, the Harambe meme gave you a chance to mock what you viewed as the hypocritical haranguing of the mainstream while avoiding real issues of social justice; and if you were a conservative, the Harambe meme gave you a chance to mock liberal hysteria." One meme is a play on conspiracy theories, such as "Bush did Harambe", a reference to 9/11 conspiracy theories. In Australia, people joked about supporting Harambe's corpse as a write-in candidate on the ballot for the federal election. Public Policy Polling included Harambe in their polling for the U.S. presidential election. Harambe had 5% support in late July 2016 (ahead of Green Party nominee Jill Stein) and 2% in August 2016 (tied with Stein).

Cincinnati Zoo director Thane Maynard reacted negatively: "We are not amused by the memes, petitions and signs about Harambe. Our zoo family is still healing, and the constant mention of Harambe makes moving forward more difficult for us. We are honoring Harambe by redoubling our gorilla conservation efforts and encouraging others to join us." In late August, the zoo deleted its Twitter account after being targeted daily by trolls mentioning Harambe. The zoo resumed its account two months later.

=== Comedic culture ===
As noted by Chris Rosales, "While the gorilla's death is tragic, the culture that has spawned around it is quite comedic."

A self-described underground culture collective known as Otaku Gang released a computer parody fighting game known as Harambe vs. Capcom, with Harambe being able to fight characters from Capcom's Street Fighter franchise.

American rappers Young Thug and Dumbfoundead each released songs entitled "Harambe". The former did so on his 2016 album Jeffery, each track of which is named after one of his "idols", although the lyrics do not reference the gorilla; the latter likens the fate of the ape to gang violence and police brutality. Canadian dubstep producer Excision included a song titled "Harambe" on his 2016 album Virus.

On June 16, 2017, satire news site The Onion featured a parody article of professional wrestler Big Show being killed by WWE after a seven-year-old boy wandered into his fight cage. On March 30, 2019, Elon Musk released a two-minute rap song titled "RIP Harambe" onto his SoundCloud. The track was performed by Yung Jake, written by him and Caroline Polachek. Rolling Stone magazine called the track "a bouncy tribute to Harambe".

On October 18, 2021, the 7-foot-tall (2.1 m) bronze statue Harambe was placed in Bowling Green Park in New York City, facing the Charging Bull statue, to promote Sapien Network. The statue of Harambe facing the bull, whose feet were surrounded by 10,000 bananas, was a statement about wealth disparity.

In October 2023, a new pedestrian bridge in Mauldin, South Carolina, was listed as "Harambe Memorial Bridge" on Google Maps before the bridge had been officially named. The city was petitioned to keep the proposed name, but in February 2024 it was officially named the Mauldin Gateway Bridge.

On May 28, 2026, on what would have been Harambe's 27th birthday, the White House released a statement lamenting the ten-year anniversary of his death, calling him a "true patriot". The statement said Harambe was "a symbol of loyalty, strength, chaos, unity, and the strange beauty of the internet bringing millions of people together".

== Later developments ==
In September 2017, the zoo added Mshindi, a 29-year-old male western lowland gorilla transferred from the Louisville Zoo. He joined females Chewie, 21, and Mara, 22, who were present on the day of the killing. At the same time, the zoo created a new indoor habitat where the public can view the gorillas year-round from behind safety glass.

On the 2023 World Gorilla Day (September 24), the feature-length documentary Harambe was released. The film is critical of Harambe's killing. It shows new photographs and video footage from the day, and claims new evidence that Harambe was trying to return the boy to his parents.

== See also ==
- 100 men versus a gorilla, a thought experiment that also became an Internet meme
- Binti Jua, subject of a similar incident in 1996
- List of individual apes
