= Queen Elizabeth Gate =

Celebratory landmark in London for The Queen Mother

Coordinates: 51°30′15″N 0°09′09″W

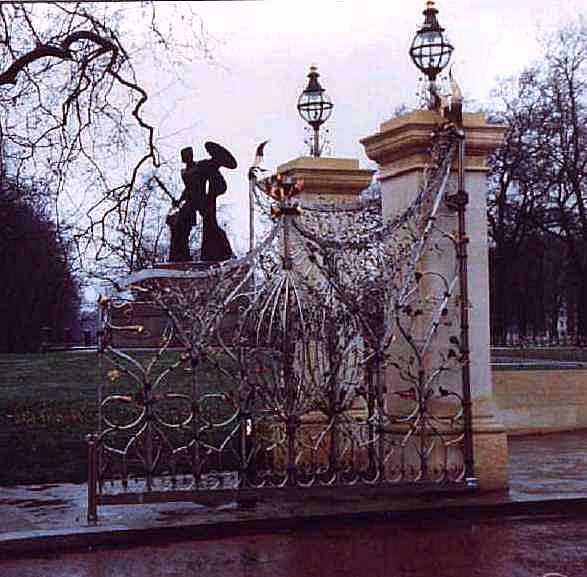
Queen Elizabeth Gate, Hyde Park, by Giusseppe Lund

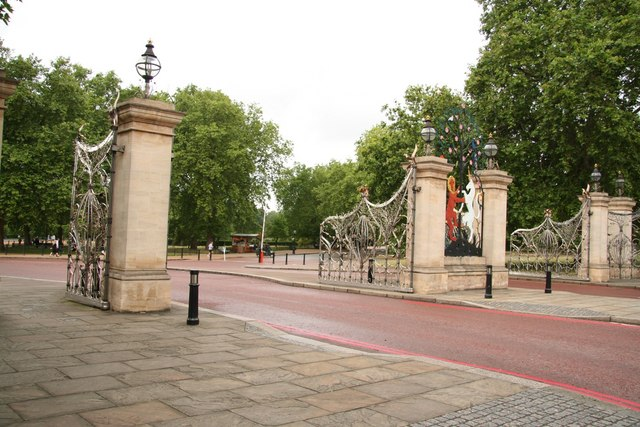
Queen Elizabeth Gates - geograph.org.uk - 908215

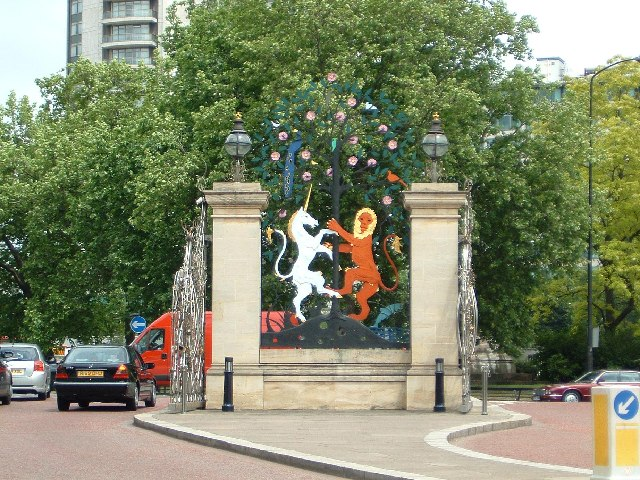
Queen Elizabeth Gate, 2005

Queen Elizabeth Gate, also known as the Queen Mother's Gate, is an entrance consisting of two pairs and two single gates of forged stainless steel and bronze situated in Hyde Park, London, behind Apsley House at Hyde Park Corner. There is also a centre feature made of painted cast iron.

It was opened by Queen Elizabeth II in 1993 to celebrate the 90th birthday of her mother, Queen Elizabeth The Queen Mother. It cost £1.5 million to construct, raised by private individuals and public funding, under the patronage of Prince Michael of Kent.

The stainless steel and bronze gates, railings and lights were designed and made by Giusseppe Lund. The centre piece, featuring a red lion (England) and a white unicorn (Scotland), was designed by sculptor David Wynne.

The organic nature of the forged steel reflects the Queen Mother's love of flowers, particularly those from a cottage garden. Her life spanned most of the century and this is represented by a flow from formal symmetry at the base of the gates upwards to an increasing freedom of line at the top. Many of the elements are free to move when touched and the whole structure vibrates when moved. This is in direct contrast to the heavier rectilinear gates found in other entrances to the park.

Although much admired, it was described as "hideous" by architect Zaha Hadid. Another architect, Richard Rogers, described it as "romantic candyfloss", and Viscount Linley, a grandson of the Queen Mother's, was reported as saying that he "absolutely loathed" the work. The then arts minister, Lord St John of Fawsley, said they were "full of joy, strength and courage, like the personage in whose honour they have been created".

There were also initial concerns that the metal was rusting due to a misunderstanding of the nature of the gate's colouring which was in fact a deliberate creation of chromium oxides with the application of heat. This treatment has since proved to be extremely durable thanks to the initial intensifying of the chromium content on the surface by the use of electro-polishing
