= Harambe (statue) =

Sculpture of Harambe, a gorilla

- Artist: Unrevealed
- Year: 2021
- Medium: Bronze
- Subject: Harambe
- Dimensions: 2.1336 m × 0.741 m × 0.420 m (7.000 ft × 2.43 ft × 1.38 ft)
- Location: New York City, New York

The Harambe statue is a seven-foot-tall, bronze sculpture of deceased western lowland gorilla Harambe designed by a civic group called Sapien.Network. It first appeared in public on Monday, October 18, 2021, on Wall Street, New York City, New York, facing the Charging Bull statue. Beneath Charging Bull were 10,000 bananas (later donated to charity).

On October 26, 2021, it was briefly placed in front of the Facebook headquarters in California.

== Sculpture and artist ==
The bronze sculpture was apparently cast in five pieces by using a lost wax technique, and soldered together by an unrevealed artist commissioned by Ankit Bhatia and Robert Giometti of Sapien.Network group.

== Reaction ==
Multiple news agencies reported on the Harambe statue. The news spread beyond North America, with French newspaper Libération covering Harambe.

== See also ==
- Gorilla, 1961 sculpture in London
