= Heritage Village Museum =

Recreated 1800s community in Sharonville, Ohio

- Location within Ohio
- Location: Sharonville, Ohio
- Coordinates: 39°16′41″N 84°24′0″W
- Type: Open-air museum
- Website: www.heritagevillagecincinnati.org

Heritage Village Museum is a recreated 1800s community in Southwestern Ohio, in the United States. The village contains 13 historic buildings from around the Cincinnati area; they were moved here to save them from destruction. The village is located within Sharon Woods Park in Sharonville, Ohio.

Heritage Village is open year-round for self-guided tours.

== Architecture ==
The historic buildings located in the village include:

- Hayner House, a Greek Revival building featuring fluted column with Ionic capitals, bilateral wings, and seven fireplaces on the first floor and two in the basement. The house was originally built in 1852. It eventually began to deteriorate, was dismantled and put into storage. In 1967 it was rebuilt and restored to its original form at Heritage Village Museum. The house was once located in Warren County Ohio, right alongside the Little Miami River close to South Lebanon. In 1862 John Hayner purchased the property the house sat upon along with several other local farms. Hayner made his living by raising and drying corn. Later, he and a few business partners, started to can corn and the business flourished. When there was no longer a need for dry corn, he turned his drying barn into a cannery.
- Elk Lick House is an example of Carpenter Gothic architecture moved from Clermont County Ohio. It is estimated that the house was built in 1818 and the addition was added in the 1840s. The Two sections of the Elk Lick House have distinctive differences. The original two-room, 1818 cottage in the back had simple lines on the outside and basic woodwork on the inside. The front section is more ornate and speaks of mild affluence. The mid-century country farmhouse is from the Elk Lick Valley. Several different owners lived in the house and eventually built on the front portion. The house was scheduled to be demolished to make way for the East Fork Reservoir. The Miami Purchase Association for Historic Prevention rescued it by purchasing it from the U.S. Army Corps of Engineers in 1969.
- Chester Park Train Station is an example of Italianate architecture. It was formerly known as Spring Grove Train Station or Witton Place. In Southwestern Ohio, early settlements along the Ohio River and its tributaries employed riverine transportation, but other settlements inland had no way of getting their extra produce to the market. Trains became the primary means of carrying goods inland to markets but also a better form of transportation. Villagers used the trains to travel from town to town, to take pleasure excursions and commute from suburbs to the city. In 1875, across the road from where the station was located, a racetrack called Chester Park was built. The small station quickly became inadequate to handle the crowds of customers who came from the city to this new park. In 1879 the station was enlarged and named Chester Park. This is the structure that now resides at the Heritage Village Museum.
- Benedict Cottage is a Federal building whose original structure was hidden under a Greek Revival cladding. It was originally thought to have been built sometime between 1825 through 1850, but it may be older than that estimate. Originally built as a workman's cottage along Mill Creek, it was eventually moved west of Springfield Pike near Glendale-Milford Road in Woodlawn. There it functioned as a caretaker's home on the grounds of the Benedict Estate, then owned by the Burchenal family of the Procter & Gamble Company. In October 1997 the cottage was moved four miles to the Heritage Village Museum, which has restored it and uses it to interpret 19th-century textile crafts.
- Vorhes House is another Federal building and a typical Cincinnati-area farmhouse from the 1820s or 1830s. Moved from Cornell Road in Blue Ash, it is a substantial and well-built residence. Its floor plan has two rooms and two fireplaces on the first floor and three rooms with two fireplaces on the second floor, which can be reached by either of two staircases.
- Kemper House was built in 1804 by James and Judith Kemper and came from the Walnut Hills section of Cincinnati. Ordained in late October 1792, Rev. Kemper was the first Presbyterian minister ordained north of the Ohio River. This building is considered a house rather than a cabin because of the plastered walls, staircase and wood trim, as well as a large sitting room. Kemper family members continued living in the house until its relocation to the Cincinnati Zoo in 1912.
- Somerset Church was built around 1829 and was located at Fields Ertel and Montgomery Roads in Deerfield Township. Rev. Kemper, who never preached at the church, was instrumental in installing the church's first minister. Rev. Kemper's log house now sits next to Somerset Church at Heritage Village Museum. Its roots begin in 1801, when the Montgomery Presbyterian Church was organized. Church records indicate that its Sunday school attendance was large compared to average worship attendance. The building has been restored to its original appearance and is used for special events in addition to representing the place of early settlers' Christian faith.
- Langdon Medical Office is an example of 1850s Steamboat Gothic architecture. It was the doctor's office of Dr. Henry A. Langdon, a Civil War physician who resided in the Langdon House in Columbia-Tusculum, whence the office was moved. Here Langdon practiced medicine from 1865 to 1876, and the museum interprets it and its collection of 19th-century medical instruments to tell the story of medicine in the 19th century. Relocation from Columbia-Tusculum required complete dismantling and reassembly.
- Fetter General Store is an example of Leadville architecture, moved from Main Street in Boston (now known as Owensville) in Clermont County. Constructed in the 1860s and named for owner John C. Fetter, it was acquired by the Heritage Village Museum in 1983. Extensively deteriorated, the exterior has been restored and is used for education programs.
- Schram Printing Company was located on Madison Avenue in Covington, Kentucky. The building located at the Village is not the original structure for the print shop; it was built as a replica of an original structure in order to hold a collection of printing presses and letter trays donated by Schram.
- Gatch Barn is believed to be one of the oldest barns from Clermont County and comes from the Gatch family farm.
- Myers Schoolhouse is a one-room schoolhouse that was built in 1891. It was taken from Delhi Township.
