= James Kemper =

James Kemper may refer to:

- James L. Kemper (1823–1895), American lawyer, Confederate general, and Governor of Virginia
- James S. Kemper (1886–1981), American businessman, philanthropist, and diplomat

== See also ==
- Kemper Log House, built by Reverend James Kemper
