= Cincinnati Zoo and Botanical Garden =

Zoo in Cincinnati, Ohio, United States

Cincinnati Zoo
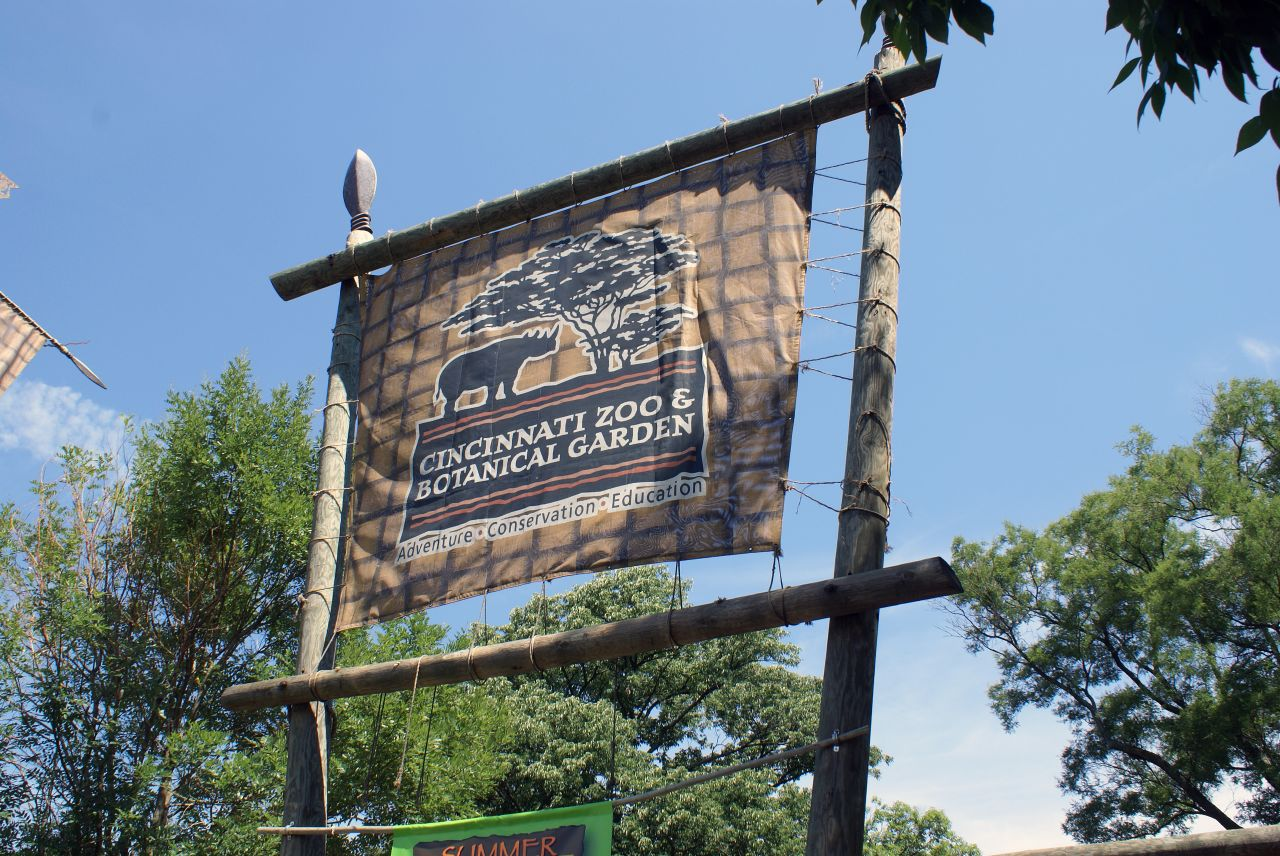
- Interactive map of Cincinnati Zoo
- 39°08′42″N 84°30′27″W
- Date opened: 1875
- Location: 3400 Vine St, Cincinnati, Ohio, U.S.
- Land area: 75 acres (30 ha)
- No. of animals: 1,896
- No. of species: 500+
- Annual visitors: 1.2 million+
- Memberships: AZA, WAZA
- Public transit: SORTA
- Website: cincinnatizoo.org

The Cincinnati Zoo & Botanical Garden is a zoo in the Avondale neighborhood of Cincinnati, Ohio. It is the second oldest zoo in the United States, founded in 1873 and officially opening in 1875. It originally began with 64.5 acres (26.1 ha) in the middle of the city, but has spread into the neighboring blocks and several reserves in Cincinnati's outer suburbs. Several historic buildings were designated as a National Historic Landmark in 1987.

The zoo houses over 400 species, 1,800 animals and 3,000 plant species. In addition, the zoo also has conducted several breeding programs in its history, and was the first to successfully breed California sea lions. In 1986, the Lindner Center for Conservation and Research of Endangered Wildlife (CREW) was created to further the zoo's goal of conservation. The zoo is known for being the home of Martha, the last living passenger pigeon, and of Incas, the last living Carolina parakeet. It is also known as the home of the gorilla Harambe and the hippopotamus Fiona, both animals that garnered online fame.

The zoo is an accredited member of the Association of Zoos and Aquariums (AZA), and a member of the World Association of Zoos and Aquariums (WAZA).

In 2014, USA Today included the Cincinnati Zoo in a ranking of U.S. zoos based on data provided by the Association of Zoos and Aquariums. A 2019 reader's choice ranking of the nation's best zoos by USA Today named the Cincinnati Zoo the top zoo in North America.

== History ==
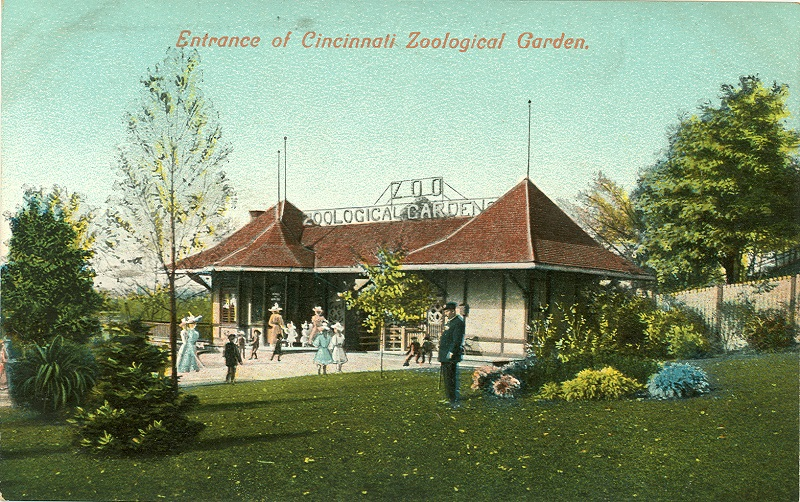
Entrance of the Cincinnati Zoological Gardens from the year of its opening in 1875

In 1872, three years before the zoo's creation, Andrew Erkenbrecher and several other residents created the Society for the Acclimatization of Birds in Cincinnati to acquire insect-eating birds to control an severe outbreak of caterpillars. A collection of approximately 1,000 birds imported from Europe in 1872 was housed in Burnet Woods before being released. Besides a group of birds that he had collected, Erkenbrecker owned a group of mammals of all types, including monkeys and an elephant that he had bought from a circus. In 1873, members of the Society of Acclimatization began discussing the idea of starting a zoo and founded The Zoological Society of Cincinnati. One year later, the Zoological Society of Cincinnati purchased a 99-year lease on 65 acres (26 ha) in the cow pasture known as Blakely Woods.

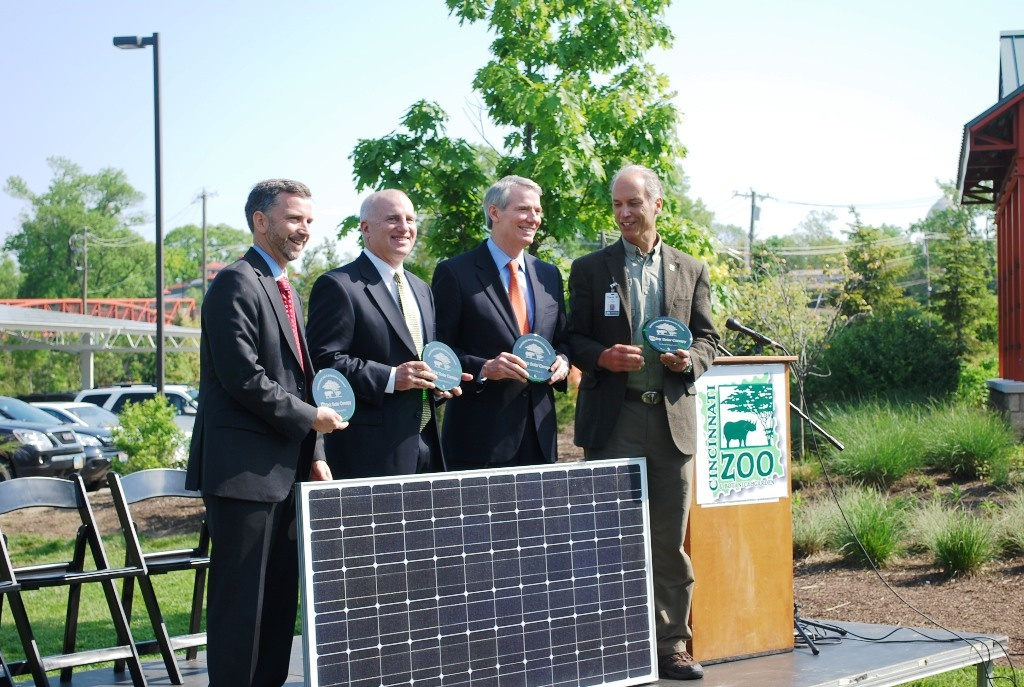
Assistant Secretary of the Treasury Dan Tangherlini traveled to Cincinnati to help dedicate the nation's largest publicly accessible urban solar array in 2011. The 6,400 solar panels provide shaded parking for the Cincinnati Zoo's visitors and will produce about 20 percent of the Zoo's annual energy needs

The Cincinnati Zoological Gardens officially opened its doors on September 18, 1875. The original landscape design was by Adolph Strauch. Architect James W. McLaughlin, who constructed the zoo's first buildings, designed the earliest completed zoological exhibits in the United States. The zoo began with eight monkeys, two grizzly bears, three white-tailed deer, six raccoons, two elk, a buffalo, a laughing hyena, a tiger, an American alligator, a circus elephant, and over four hundred birds, including a talking crow. The first guide book about the Cincinnati Zoo was written in 1876 in German. The founders of the zoo, including its first general manager, were German immigrants and the city had quite a large German-speaking population. The first English-language edition (illustrated) was published in 1893.

In its first 20 years, the zoo experienced many financial difficulties, and despite selling 22 acres (8.9 ha) to pay off debt in 1886, it went into receivership in 1898. In order to prevent the zoo from being liquidated, the stockholders chose to give up their interests of the $225,000 they originally invested. For the next two years, the zoo was run under the Cincinnati Zoological Company as a business. In 1901, the Cincinnati Traction Company, purchased the zoo, hoping to use it as a way to market itself to potential customers. They operated the zoo until 1917, when the Cincinnati Zoological Park Association, funded by donations from philanthropists Mary Emery and Anna Sinton Taft and a wave of public desire to purchase the increasingly popular zoo, took over management. In 1932, the city purchased the zoo, an action that had been advocated for by Ohio state senator Robert J. O'Brien in 1916, and started to run it through the Board of Park Commissioners. This marked the zoo's transition from its period of financial insecurity to its modern state of stable growth and fiscal stability.

In addition to its live animal exhibits, the zoo houses refreshments stands, a dance hall, roads, walkways, and picnic grounds. Between 1920 and 1972, the Cincinnati Summer Opera performed in an open-air pavilion and were broadcast by NBC radio.

=== "More Home to Roam" expansion campaign ===
In 2018 the zoo launched an expansion campaign named "More Home to Roam" with the goal of raising $150 million to be used on developing new attractions and infrastructure. The zoo opened the Roo Valley and African Penguin Point in summer of 2020, and they have plans to renovate the Lords of the Arctic area to bring back the black bears and introduce sea otters after their last polar bear named Little One was euthanized due to a renal failure in March 2021. The Rhino Reserve renovations and a 1,800 vehicle parking garage will hopefully be open by 2023, Elephant Trek opened in fall of 2024, and the old elephant exhibit was changed into Giraffe Junction, where the concrete dome was repaired, the roof replaced, windows installed, a new garden area added, and a habitat for giraffes. The plan also includes a new entrance to facilitate traffic into the zoo. The additions are also aimed at making the zoo net zero in terms of waste, water, and energy, making the facilities waste free.

Philanthropists Harry and Linda Fath contributed $50 million to the campaign in June 2018. Previous expansion efforts, such as the Africa exhibit and gorilla exhibit, cost $34 million and $18 million respectively.

As result on the COVID-19 pandemic, the zoo tabled its original plan to build a parking garage and bumped Elephant Trek to the top of the priority list.

=== Historic structures ===
- Cincinnati Zoo Historic Structures
- U.S. National Register of Historic Places
- U.S. National Historic Landmark
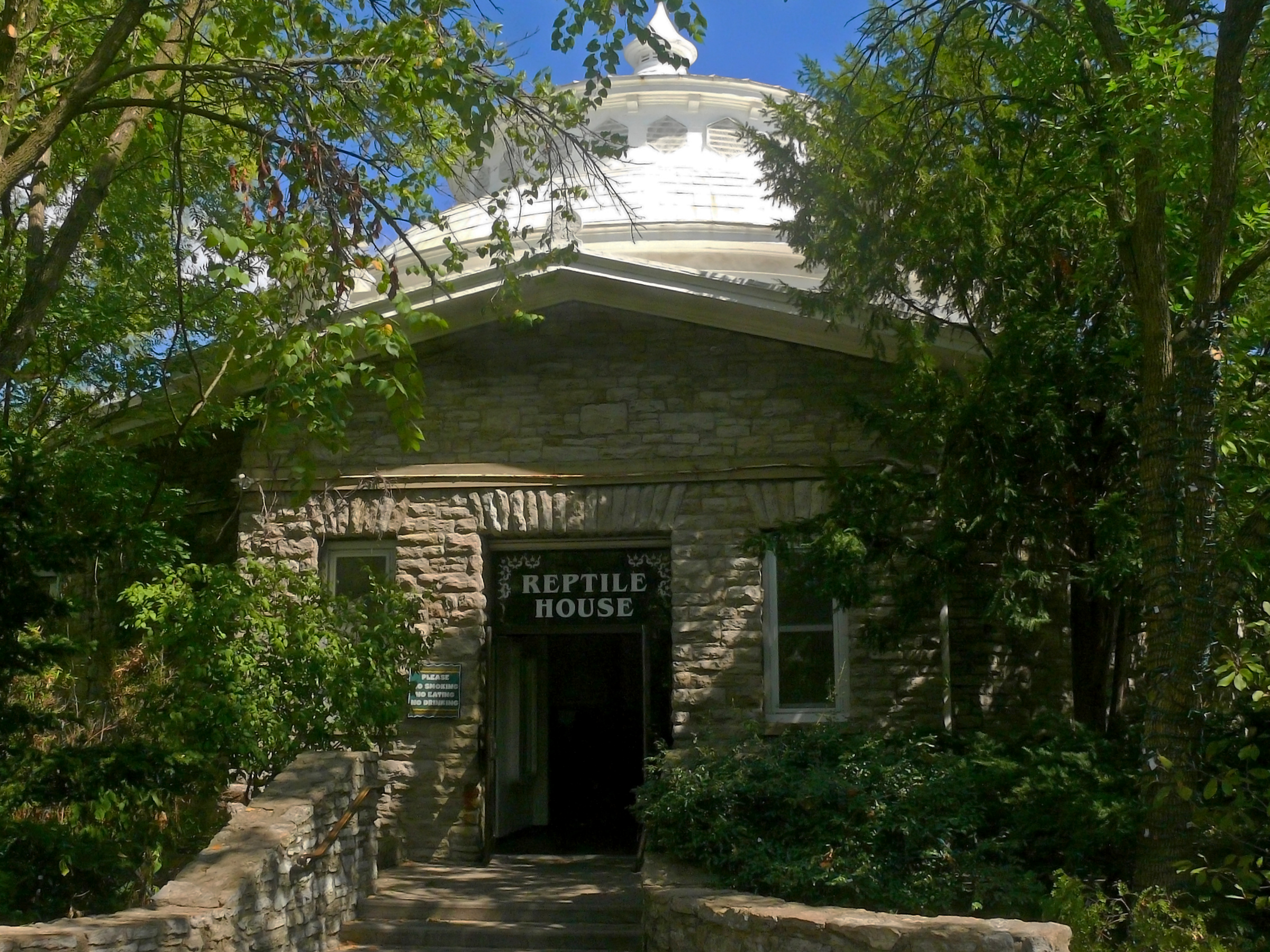
- Reptile House
- Location: 3400 Vine St., Cincinnati, Ohio
- Area: Less than 1 acre (0.40 ha)
- Built: 1880
- Architect: James W. McLaughlin
- Architectural style: East Indian Temple
- NRHP reference No.: 87000905

Significant dates
- Added to NRHP: February 27, 1987
- Designated NHL: February 27, 1987

- Cincinnati Zoo District
- Formerly listed on the U.S. National Register of Historic Places
- U.S. Historic district
- Location: Cincinnati Zoological Gardens, Cincinnati
- Area: 25 acres (10 ha)
- Built: 1876
- NRHP reference No.: 75001415
- Removed from NRHP: January 1, 1999

In 1987, parts of the zoo were designated as a National Historic Landmark, the Cincinnati Zoo Historic Structures, due to their significant architecture featured in the Elephant House, the Reptile House, and the Passenger Pigeon Memorial.

Four zoo buildings were listed on the National Register in 1975 as the "Cincinnati Zoo District", although they were removed in 1999. This district comprised the Kemper Log Cabin (built in 1804 and moved to the zoo in 1912), the Aviary, the Monkey House, and the Elephant House, the oldest existing structures in the complex at that time. The Monkey House and the Elephant House were separately included in the Cincinnati Zoo Historic Structures designation in 1987 and named a National Historic Landmark. Built of concrete and stone, the Monkey House had been constructed by 1880, along with the Aviary, and the Elephant House was built in 1902. The Kemper Log Cabin was moved to Sharon Woods Village in Sharonville in January 1982.

==== Elephant House ====
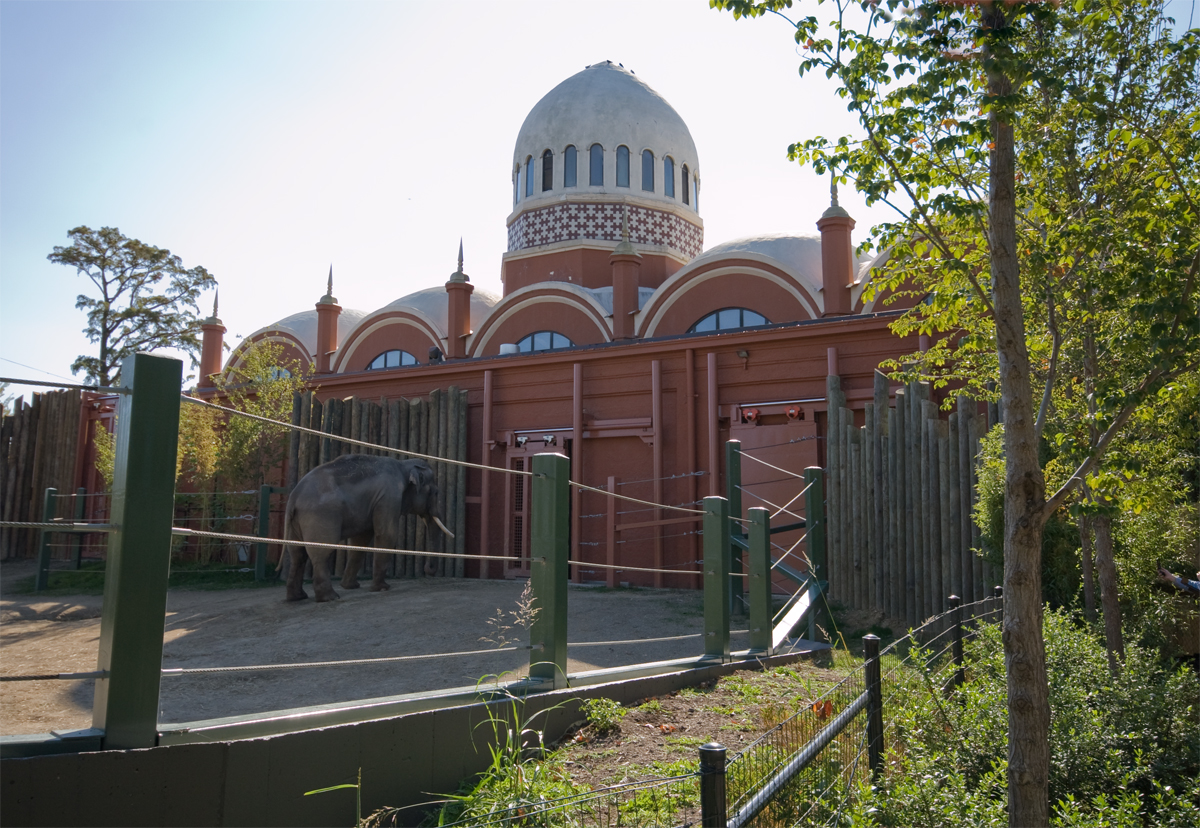
An elephant at the Elephant House

Equipped with minarets and a windowed dome, the Elephant House was built to evoke the Taj Mahal and a sense of contemporary India. This concrete structure measures 150 by 75 feet (46 m × 23 m). The zoo followed the pattern of many other zoos, which constructed animal houses in the styles of the countries whence the animals came, but the Elephant House was one of the last zoo buildings in the United States constructed with such a philosophy. Designed by architects Elzner and Anderson, it was placed atop the zoo's highest hill. Its original cost was $50,000, and in later years the zoo has expended further money on renovations.

==== Reptile House ====
Originally built as the Monkey House, the Reptile House is a round Moorish Revival building designed by James W. McLaughlin for use as the aviary. Its design centers around a large dome more than 40 feet (12 m) high, with numerous windows and skylights that enable it to be lit by sunlight, in addition to Corinthian columns. Although it was expanded in 1922 by the construction of a veterinary hospital, the zoo arranged for an extensive remodeling to prepare it for the reptiles that were first placed within it in 1951. Zoo historians claim that the Reptile House was the oldest zoo building anywhere in the United States. The original Aviary no longer stands, having been destroyed in the 1970s; a collection of gorilla exhibits occupies the site now.

== Animals and exhibits ==
=== Elephant Reserve (currently unoccupied) ===
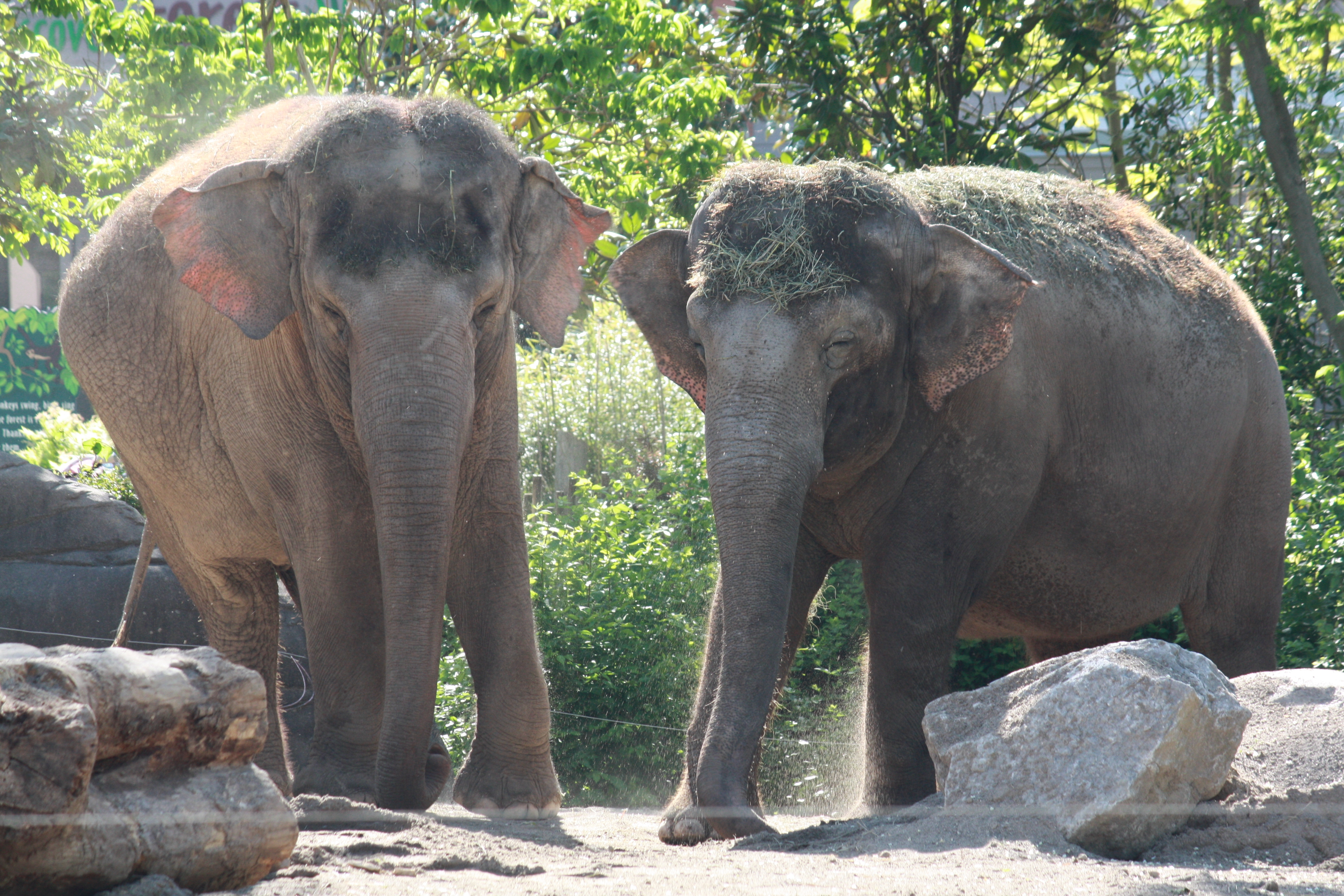
Asian Elephants (Elephas maximus) at the Elephant Reserve

The Herbivora building was constructed in 1906 for $50,000, a huge sum at the time, which was home to the zoo's Elephants, Giraffes, Hippopotamuses, and Rhinoceroses until the late 1990s. Listed on the National Register of Historic Places in 1975, it is considered one of the most spectacular historic buildings in the world. The building was 150 feet (46m) and 75 feet (23m) wide and was constructed primarily of concrete for housing hooved animals. In 2000, the attraction became Vanishing Giants, featuring giraffes, okapis, and elephants. From 2007 to 2008, the giraffe and okapi yards were renovated into a food court area, and their respective species were moved to other areas in the zoo. It has since undergone several renovations and became the Cincinnati Zoo's Elephant Reserve at that time.

Elephant Reserve was the home to two subspecies of the Asian elephant in a four-acre (1.6 ha) exhibit with a 60,000-gallon pool in the female yard. The zoo has been trying to breed the two, but they have been unsuccessful since their last baby in 1998.

As of October 1, 2024, the elephants were moved to the Elephant Trek. The current Elephant Reserve is to become Giraffe Tower sometime in the future.

=== P&G Discovery Forest ===
Renovated in 1989, this classroom is used for live animal demonstrations for school groups and zoo visitors presented regularly during the summer. The building houses a few species, including a Linnaeus's two-toed sloths, Florida box turtle, and the Eastern box turtle. It also contains many small animals used for demonstrations as part of the zoo’s visitor engagement program.

=== Eagle Eyrie ===
This flight cage opened in 1970 as one of the largest flight cages of its time. Originally containing bald eagles, these were moved elsewhere, and the exhibit currently features a Steller's sea eagle and an Andean condor.

=== Reptile House ===
The Reptile House is America's oldest surviving zoo building, built in 1875. Originally, it housed monkeys and other primates until 1951. Now, it is home to over 30 reptile species from around the world in both indoor and outdoor exhibits. Selected species include Chinese alligators, Gila monsters, brown anoles, emerald tree monitors, quince monitors, Pascagoula map turtles, pancake tortoises, spider tortoises, poison dart frogs, Titicaca water frogs, hellbenders, black rat snakes, corn snakes, rattlesnakes, pine snakes, king cobras, Indochinese spitting cobras, boa constrictors, emerald tree boas and West African Gaboon vipers. Neighboring the Reptile House are two outdoor exhibits featuring the Galápagos tortoises and rescued bald eagles, the latter formerly contained Japanese macaques.

=== Gorilla World ===
This exhibit opened in 1978 as a naturalistic, rain forest habitat for the Cincinnati Zoo's western lowland gorillas. The Cincinnati Zoo leads the country in gorilla births with 51. Mboka Jo was the last gorilla born at the zoo in 2025. The zoo holds the record for having 6 gorilla births in one year in 1995. In this same year, one of their gorillas gave birth to the world's first test-tube gorilla. Near the gorilla exhibits, the zoo also features black-and-white colobus monkeys.

=== Night Hunters ===
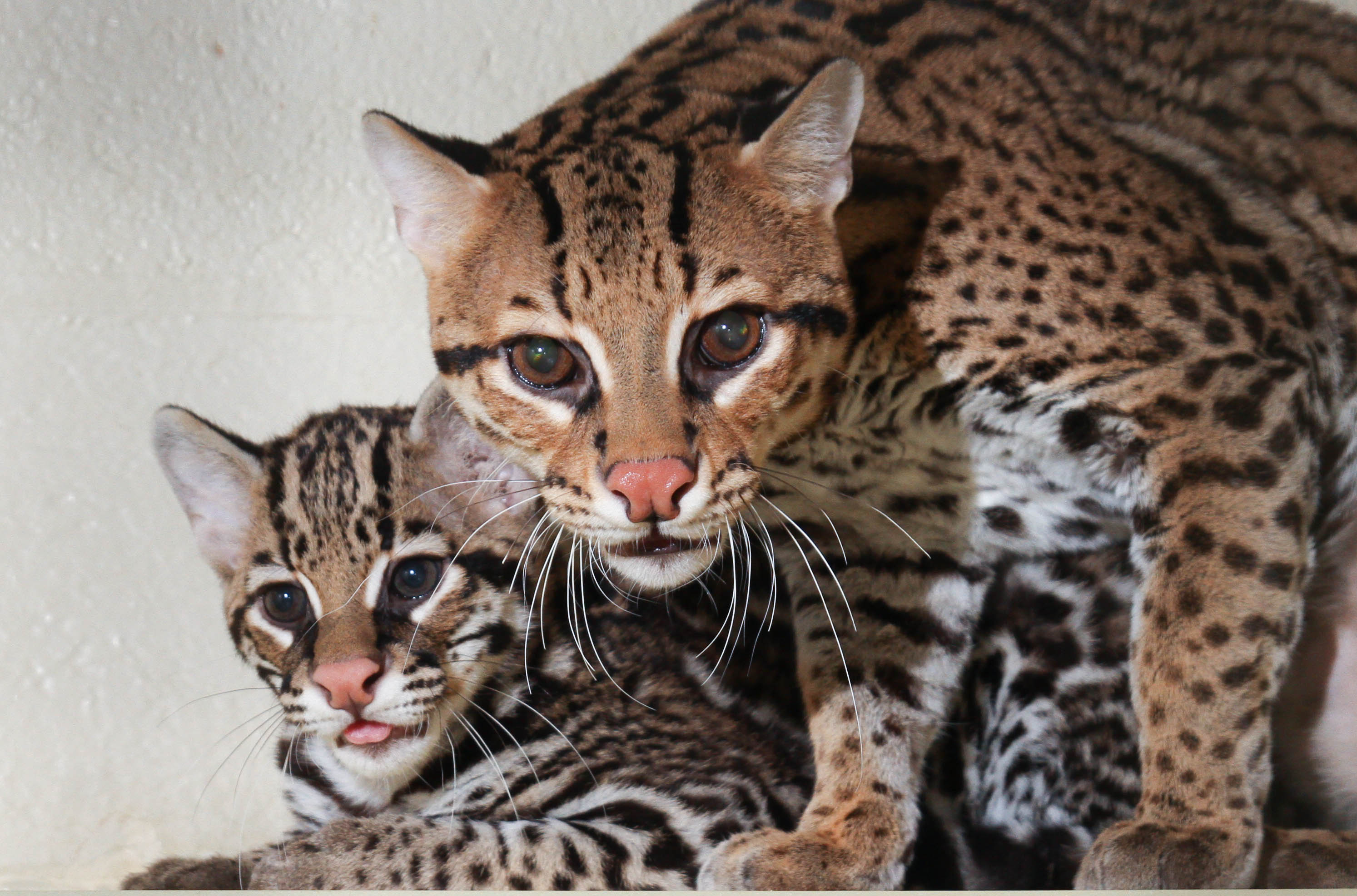
A mother ocelot (Leopardus pardalis) and her cub at the zoo

The Carnivora Building was built in 1952. In 1985, it was renovated to become the Cat House. From 2010 to 2011, it was renovated again to become the Night Hunters exhibit. It is home to many nocturnal and/or predatory animals previously found in other exhibits throughout the zoo, including aardvarks, binturong, black-footed cats, fishing cats, clouded leopards, common vampire bats, fennec foxes, Indian flying foxes, large-spotted genets, Pallas's cats, ringtails, a Gambian pouched rat, sand cats, and tawny frogmouths. During the day, lights inside the building are kept very low to allow visitors to view the animals in their natural nocturnal habitats.

=== Cat Canyon ===
Cat Canyon houses feline species, including cougars, Malayan tigers, and snow leopards. The exhibit also supports educational conservation programs focused on threatened species. Included at the end of this trail is an exhibit housing Eurasian eagle-owls.

=== World of the Insect ===
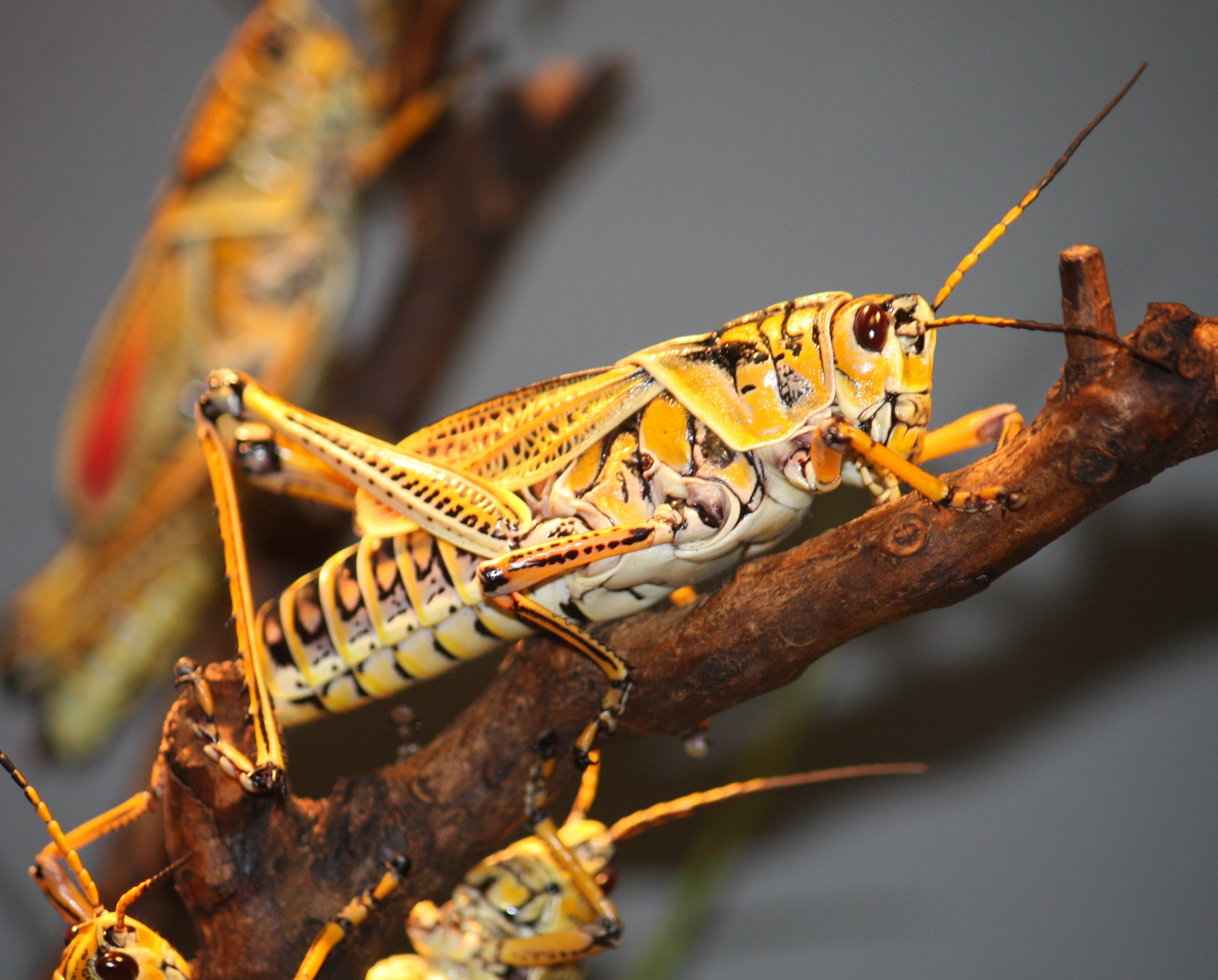
Eastern lubber grasshopper (Romalea microptera) at the World of the Insect exhibit

Opened in 1978, this is the largest building in North America devoted to the display of live insects. The Cincinnati Zoo has been given four awards by the American Zoo and Aquarium Association for successful propagation of insects, and World of the Insect received the prized American Zoo and Aquarium Association exhibit award in 1979. This building also features the longest ant exhibit in the world, housing colonies of leafcutter ants. Some of its species include Antilles pinktoe tarantulas, Brazilian whiteknee tarantulas, dragon-headed katydids, Eastern lubber grasshoppers, marbled crayfish, Texas bullet ants and water scorpions. Despite being an insect house, it also displays Fire belly newts, the Phelsuma grandis, poison dart frogs, Argentine horned frogs and even naked mole-rats

=== Dragons! ===
This building features five species of colorful monitor lizards ranging from Southeast Asia and Australia. In the past, this exhibit housed other animal species until the zoo received the largest Komodo dragon to ever live in captivity in the Western Hemisphere, named Naga. He was a gift from George H. W. Bush from the Indonesian Government. The Cincinnati Zoo was the second U.S. zoo to exhibit Komodo dragons and the second zoo to breed them outside of Indonesia. The exhibit was renovated in 2009 and opened in June 2010. A few other species of lizards such as armadillo girdled lizards, blue tree monitors and Nile monitors are also housed in this complex.

=== Lemur Lookout ===
This open-aired exhibit was built in 1962 as Baboon Island and renovated as Ibex Island. It allows guests to look down at some of the zoo's ring-tailed lemurs on a 30-foot (9.1 m) tall, man-made rock with many lush and shady areas, surrounded by a small stream.

=== Wings of Wonder ===
Wings of Wonder is an educational live show featuring different species of birds.

=== Otto M. Budig Manatee Springs ===
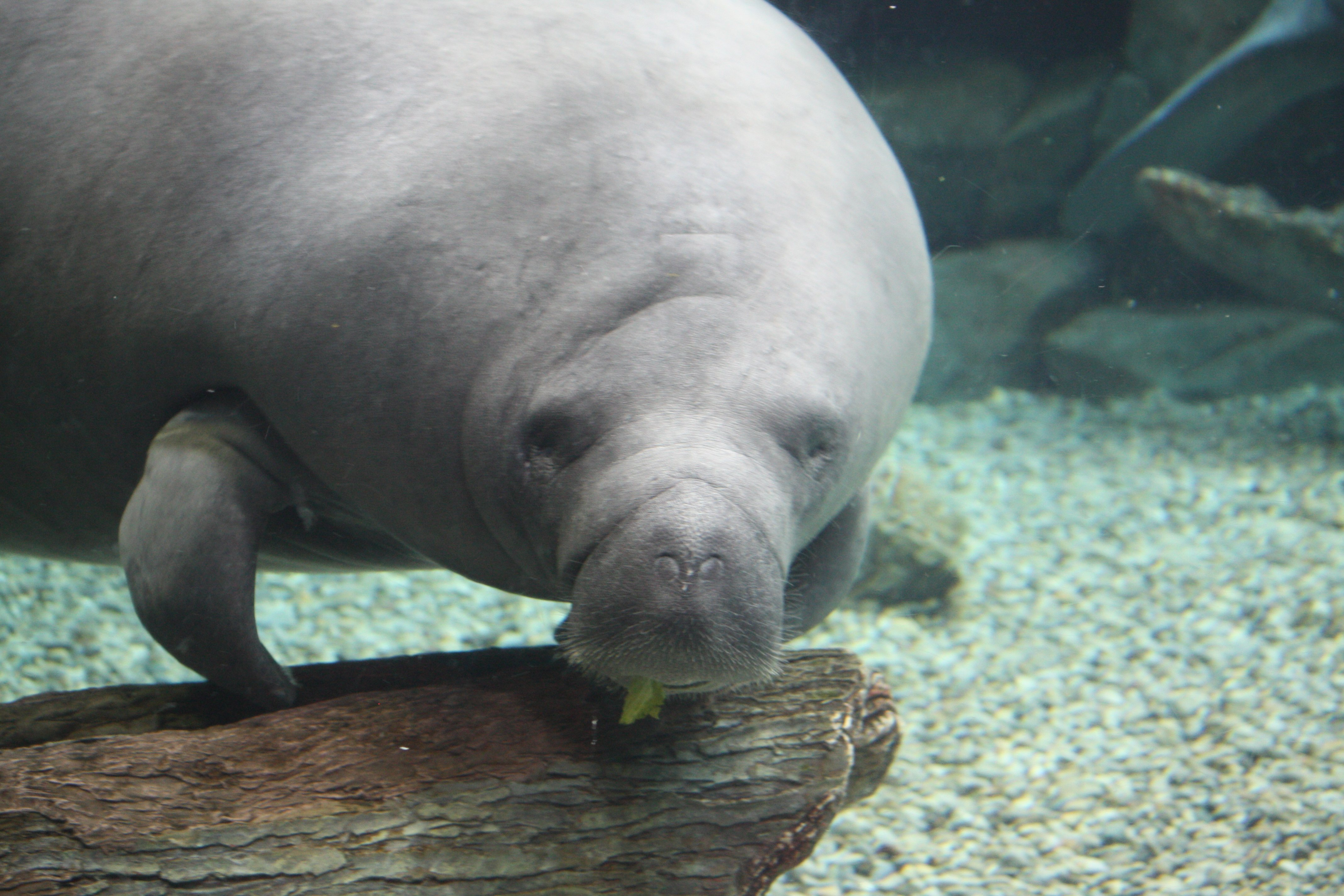
Florida Manatee (Trichechus manatus latirostris) at the zoo

Manatee Springs, a $4,500,000 attraction, opened on May 21, 1999, and was awarded the Munson Aquatic Conservation Exhibitry Award and a Significant Achievement Exhibit Award from the American Zoo and Aquarium Association in 2000. In addition to Manatees, the facility hosts over 45 other species, highlighting Florida's biodiversity. Visitors are guided along a walkway through the multiple constituent exhibits including above-ground and underwater viewing opportunities.

Manatee Springs facilities include a greenhouse (304 m^{2}) and an exhibit building (1035 m^{2}). The entire facility (1339 m^{2}) includes 171 m^{2} (1,900 ft²) of staff and support areas and 369m² (4,100 ft²) of filtration equipment space on two levels. The manatee tank is 120,000 gallons with 3 viewing areas including a bubble window. In addition to the central exhibit with Florida manatees, other Florida species are featured, including American alligators, American crocodiles, alligator gars, alligator snapping turtles, coastal plain cooters, loggerhead musk turtles, greater sirens, two-toed amphiumas and the invasive Burmese python.

=== Siegfried and Roy's White Lions of Timbavati ===
This exhibit opened as Big Cat Canyon in 1975, containing three one-year old White tigers. In February and August 1988, the Zoo obtained rare white lion cubs donated to the zoo by Siegfried and Roy. These lions successfully bred four offspring in April 2001, but as of May 2022, they had all died. The exhibit temporarily contained Bennett's wallabies and will soon contain the zoo’s Mexican wolf population.

=== Rhino Reserve ===
Built in 1935 as the African Veldt with large hoofed animals, the series of exhibits was renovated in 1997 to become Rhino Reserve. This area is home to Flamingo Cove with over twenty greater flamingos. The Cincinnati Zoo ranks as a U.S. leader in breeding eastern black rhinos with eighteen births over the course of their existence. Other featured species include okapi, yellow-backed duiker, plains zebra, eastern bongo, and Visayan warty pigs.

On July 17, 2017, a black rhino calf, Kendi, was born to parents Faru and Seyia. Kendi's birth was captured on camera and can be viewed on the zoo's website. Curator of mammals at the zoo, Christina Gorsuch states, "This calf is only the fifth eastern black rhino born in the last two years in North America." She goes on to say "Every rhino calf born is incredibly important for the population, which includes fewer than 60 in North America. Calves will stay with their mothers for 3–4 years which means that the average female can only have one calf every 5 years." In 2015, AZA and Species Survival Plan (SSP) determined that parents Utenzi (known in Cincinnati as Faru) and Seyia were a good genetic match and recommended that they breed. Faru came to Cincinnati from Atlanta in the summer of 2015 and was introduced to Seyia. Kendi was sent to San Diego Zoo Safari Park October 2019 and later to the Honolulu Zoo in 2022. Faru and Seyia's second calf, a male named Ajani Joe, was born in August 2020. Faru/Utenzi was moved to the Lincoln Park Zoo in September 2022. The zoo's two current rhinos, Seyia and A.J, were transferred out in 2025. The zoo no longer features Eastern black rhinoceros.

=== Spaulding Children's Zoo ===
Renovated in 1984–1985, 55,000 sq ft (5,100 m^{2}) of exhibits that feature common barnyard animals, animals of the eastern American woodlands, and animals of the southwest American desert such as alpacas, llamas, Nigerian Dwarf goats, Juliana pigs, guinea pigs as well as Brazilian porcupines, radiated tortoises and southern tamanduas. There is a nursery where guests can see either babies born at the zoo or babies that came to the zoo. Volunteers and keepers bring a certain harmless animal out every day for guests to be able to touch, and learn more about them. Lucille, a two-year old binturong, is the ambassador for the Cincinnati Bearcats, there is also a ground squirrel named Yam, Scamper, a rescued American red fox, and a Virginia opossum named Opal who was rescued in Northern Ohio in early 2023, she was brought to the zoo to educate guests about the importance of local wildlife.

=== Gibbon Islands ===
Completed in 1972, Gibbon Islands occupies the former location of the old Opera Pavilion. (From 1920 to 1971, the Cincinnati Zoo was home to the Cincinnati Opera Summer Festival.) These two islands are surrounded by water that flows from Swan Lake. Bamboo exercise bars are on the islands helping to immerse you in the island feel. Currently, gibbons can be found in Jungle Trails and Elephant Trek.

=== Red Panda Habitat ===
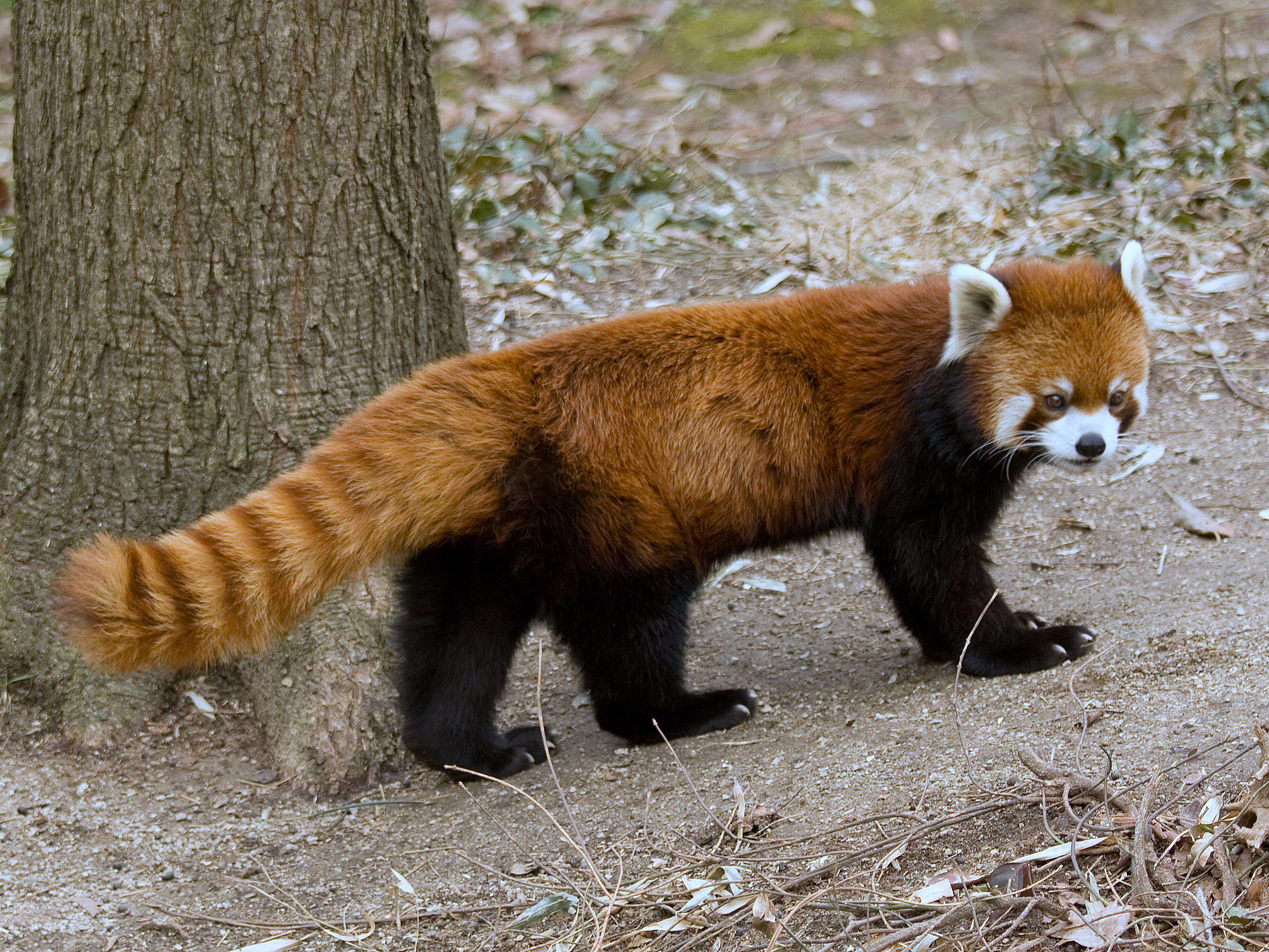
A red panda taking a stroll at the zoo

Opened in 1985, this naturalistic woodland landscape includes many native Chinese plant species to simulate the natural forest habitat of the red panda. One pair of red pandas was a gift to the Cincinnati Zoo from the Beijing Zoo in China. These lavish exhibits are opened aired, connected by a small flowing stream under low elevated bridge. It also provides many tall trees for the five red pandas to relax and sleep on. In 2025 the zoo's red panda pair Zuko and Marcy had the 100th red panda cub born at the zoo.

=== Swan Lake ===
Swan Lake is a large body of water near the zoo's entrance. The lake is home to various waterfowl species. The Cincinnati Zoo was the first place to exhibit and breed red-crowned cranes, trumpeter swans, and wood ducks.

=== Wolf Woods ===
Wolf Woods opened in 2005 after a renovation of Otter Creek. After another renovation in the summer of 2011, the second section focuses on the conservation story of the Mexican gray wolf native to the southwestern United States. Here, a rustic, historical trapper's cabin has been converted into a Mexican wolf field research station. Other species include the gray foxes, North American river otters, and barred owls.

=== North America ===
Formerly Bear Ridge, the exhibit was retooled to house North American wildlife, along with American black bears and sea otters in Fall 2025. A short “Adventure Trail” at the top of North America was also added that allows visitors to explore rockwork, find surprise animal statues in nooks, and cross over a rope bridge that simulates a hiking experience in a national forest or park.

It was also formerly Lords of the Arctic, which opened in 2000, housing species representing the northern parts of the world in a 21,000 sq ft (2,000 m^{2}) attraction. Originally housing polar bears; the last individual having died in 2021, the exhibit also featured Arctic foxes.

=== Jungle Trails ===
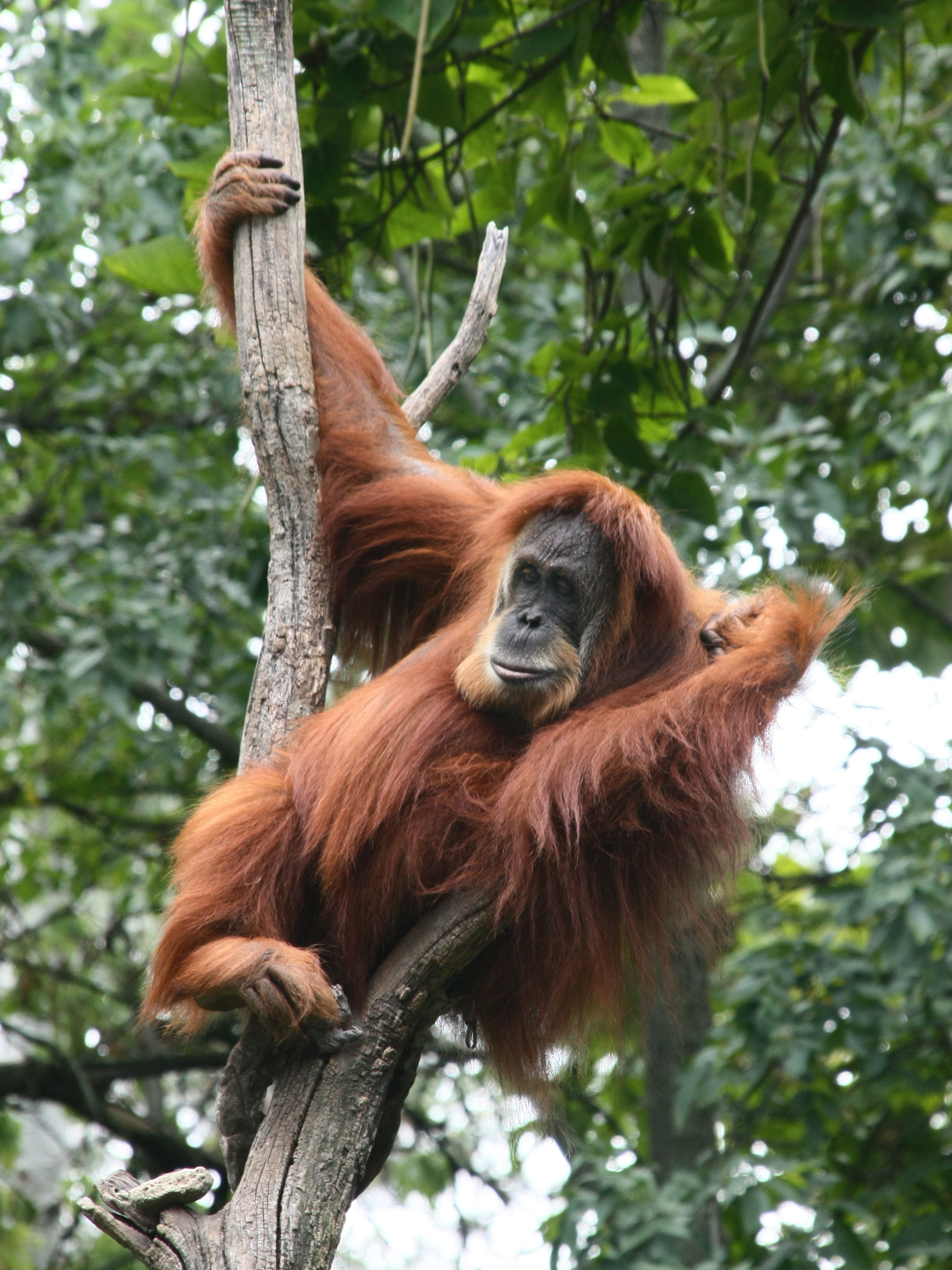
Sumatran orangutan in a tree at the zoo

Jungle Trails takes visitors through a 2.5-acre (1.0 ha) naturalized rain forest habitat, teeming with rare and exotic wildlife and hundreds of plant species from Asia, South America, and Africa. Each region in the exhibit is divided by outdoor and indoor habitats with enjoyable viewing of the Zoo's collection of rare primates birds, reptiles, insects, small mammals.

The attraction received the AZA prestigious exhibit award in 1994, a year after it opened. First, a series of outdoor exhibits features Sumatran orangutans, white-handed gibbons, Müller's gibbons, helmeted curassows and blue-throated macaws. Next, an indoor building houses pygmy slow loris, golden-headed lion tamarins, and white-faced sakis, in addition to indoor housing for the orangutans and gibbons. Further on, another series of outdoor exhibits features black howlers, bonobos, Coquerel's sifakas, and Angola colobuses. The second building features West African pottos, and an aye-aye.

=== Birds of the World ===
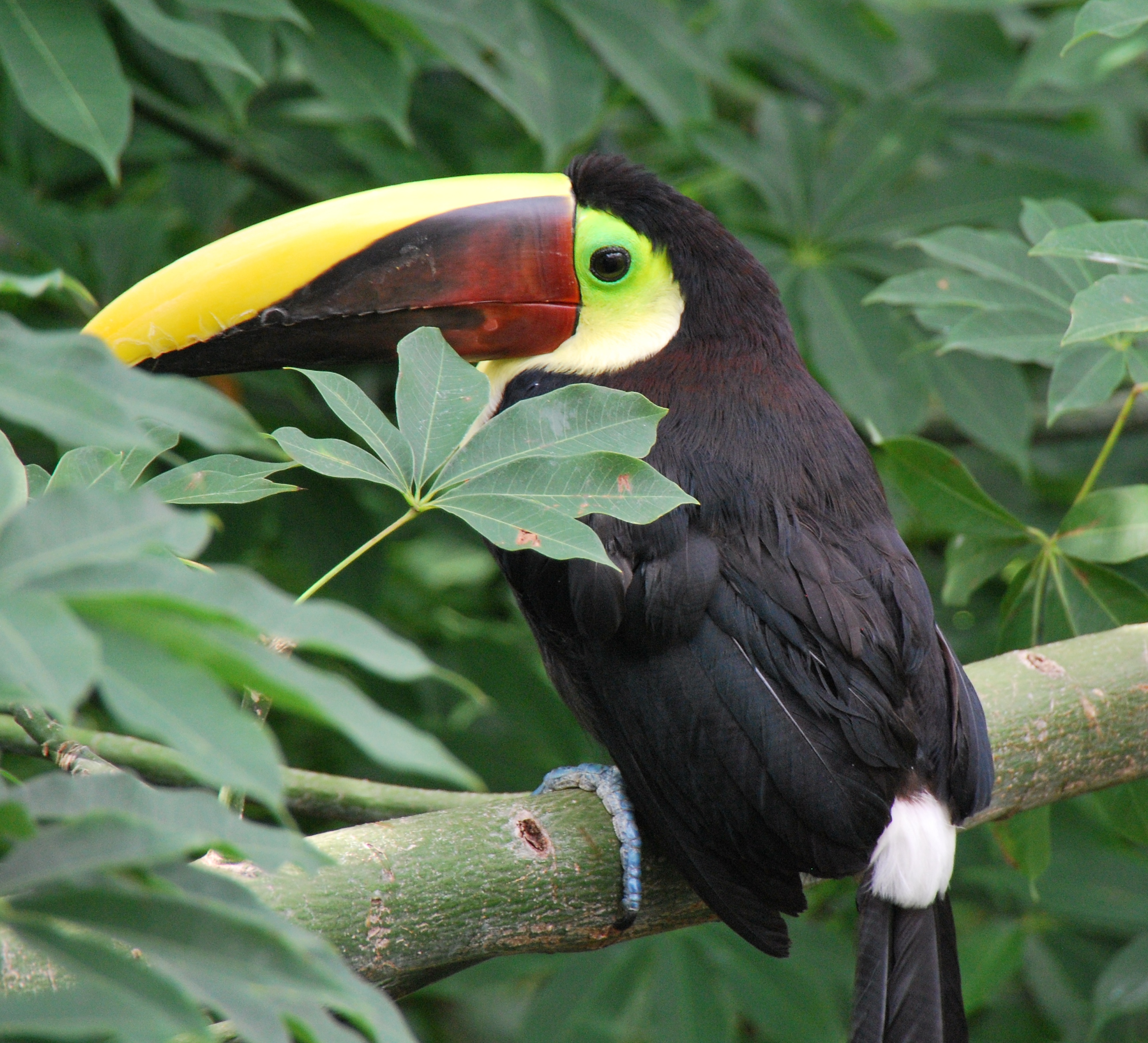
Chestnut-mandibled toucan (Ramphastos ambiguus swainsonii)

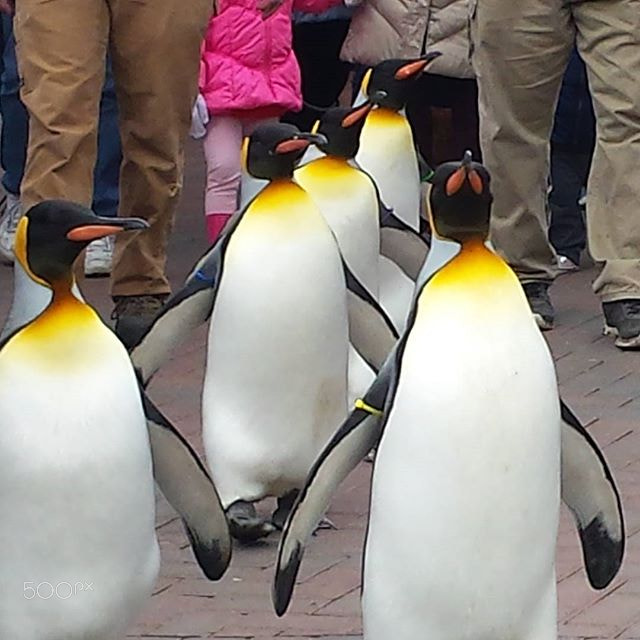
King Penguins marching through the zoo

Birds of the World features a wide-variety of bird species from throughout the entire world, including a selection of aviaries that guests can enter to get up close and personal. Birds housed include Bali mynas, boat-billed herons, buff-crested bustards, Guam rails, Inca terns, masked lapwings, sunbitterns, thick-billed parrots, penguins and puffins.

(outside)

- Salmon-crested cockatoo
- Cape Barren goose
- Major Mitchell's cockatoo

(inside)

- South America: Scarlet ibis, Sunbittern, Boat-billed heron, Southern lapwing, Indian peafowl (indigenous to Asia), Peruvian pigeon, Cattle egret, Blue-grey tanager, Red-capped cardinal, Yellow-rumped cacique, Inca tern, Guira cuckoo, Matamata turtle
- Blue-faced honeyeater, Asian fairy bluebird
- Australasia: Bali mynah, White-breasted woodswallow, Guam rail, White-naped pheasant pigeon, Nicobar pigeon, Masked lapwing, Shama thrush, Collared finchbill, Blue-crowned laughingthrush
- Mexico: Thick-billed parrot
- African Savannah: Buff-crested bustard, Golden-breasted starling, Red-and-yellow barbet, Yellow-fronted canary, Crested coua
- Southeast Asia: Rhinoceros hornbill
- Northern Oceans: Atlantic puffin, Pigeon guillemot, Common murre, Smew, Common eider, King eider, Harlequin duck, Horned puffin
- Southern Oceans: King penguin, Magellanic penguin, Southern rockhopper penguin, Chiloe wigeon, Black-faced ibis
- Free Flight Aviary: Victoria crowned pigeon, Ruddy shelduck, Chestnut-bellied malkoha, Kea, Magpie goose, Lady Ross's turaco, Red-legged seriema, Pied imperial pigeon, Ring-billed gull

=== Africa ===
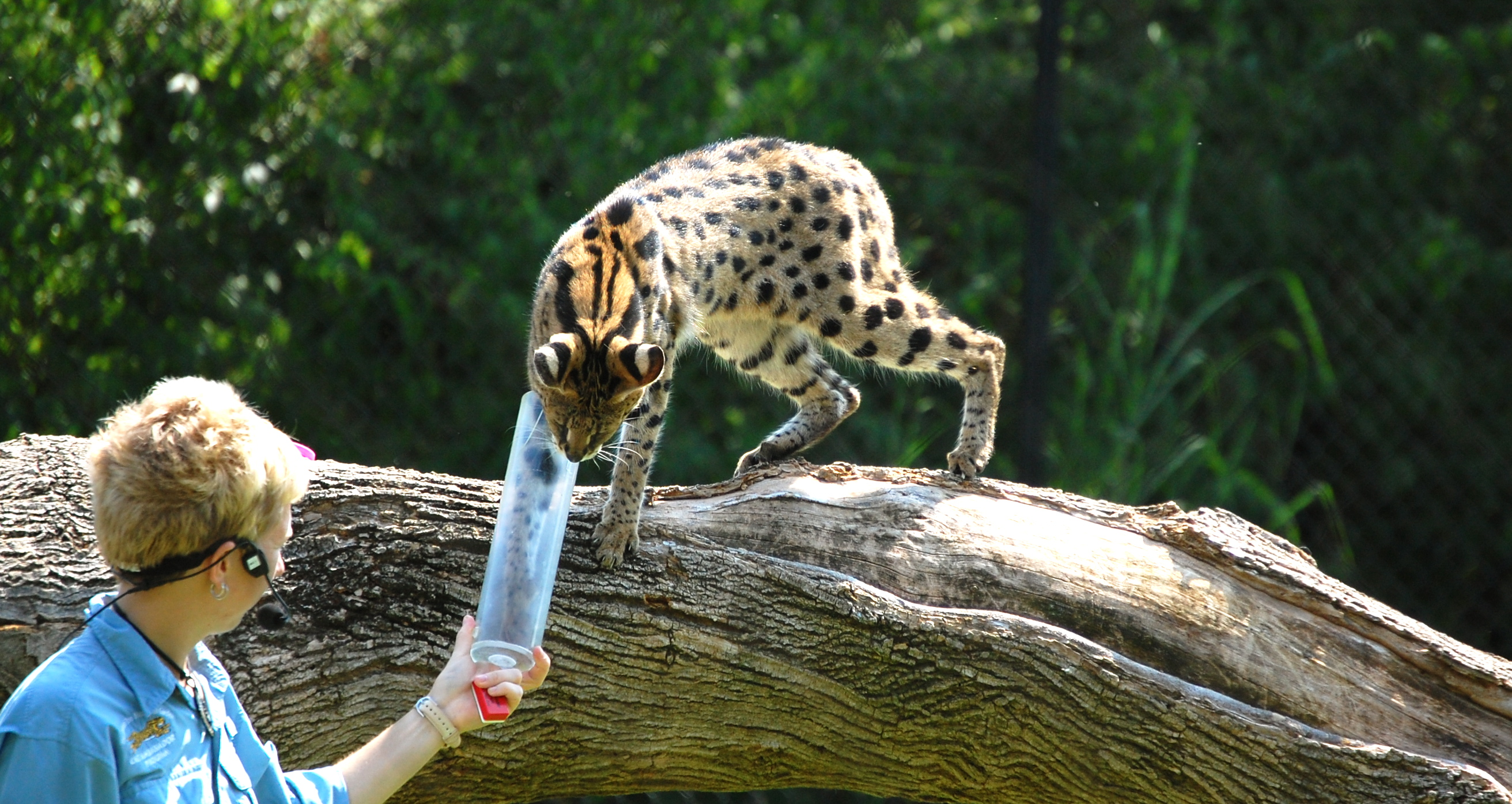
Cleo the Serval demonstrates reaching for prey

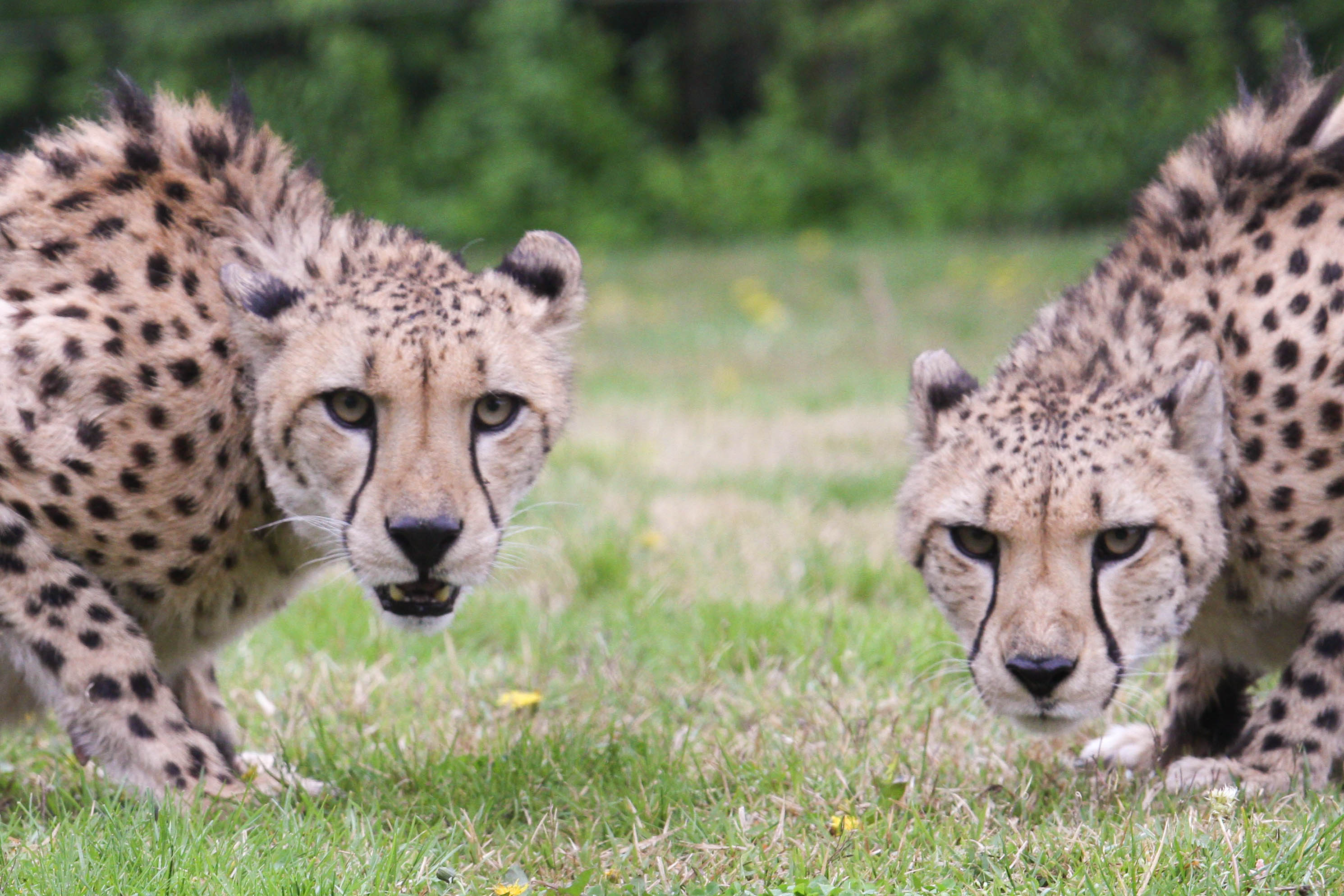
Two cheetahs (Acinonyx jubatus) tracking scents

The 27,000 sq ft (2,500 m^{2}) $1.6 million Dobsa Giraffe Ridge opened on June 6, 2008, and allows guests to feed Masai giraffes from a tall elevated platform. Guests can also view the giraffes in their indoor 25,000 sq ft (2,300 m^{2}) stalls especially during winter.

In the 2010s the zoo built an eight-acre (3.2 ha) Africa exhibit, the largest animal exhibit in its history. Phases I and II, completed in 2010, added an exhibit for cranes and expanded the Cheetah Encounter yard so that the cheetahs had a 40% larger running space. Phase III opened on June 29, 2013, and included a wider vista that offers visitors an opportunity to see African lions, servals, a bat-eared fox, African wild dogs, and a new cheetah exhibit. A new Base Camp Café, said to be the greenest restaurant in the US, was also added in the 2013 season.

Phase IV, the largest phase of the Africa expansion, opened on June 28, 2014. It introduced a wide savanna with lesser kudus, a saddle-billed stork, common ostriches, crested guineafowl, pink-backed pelicans, Rüppell's vultures, lappet-faced vultures, and grey crowned cranes.

Phase V, the final phase of the expansion, opened on July 23, 2016, adding an area for Nile hippos, Hippo Cove, which provides both above and below-water viewing. A 34-year-old male named Henry from the Dickerson Park Zoo and a 17-year-old female named Bibi from the St. Louis Zoo joined the zoo. On the morning of January 24, 2017, Bibi gave birth to a six-weeks premature calf.

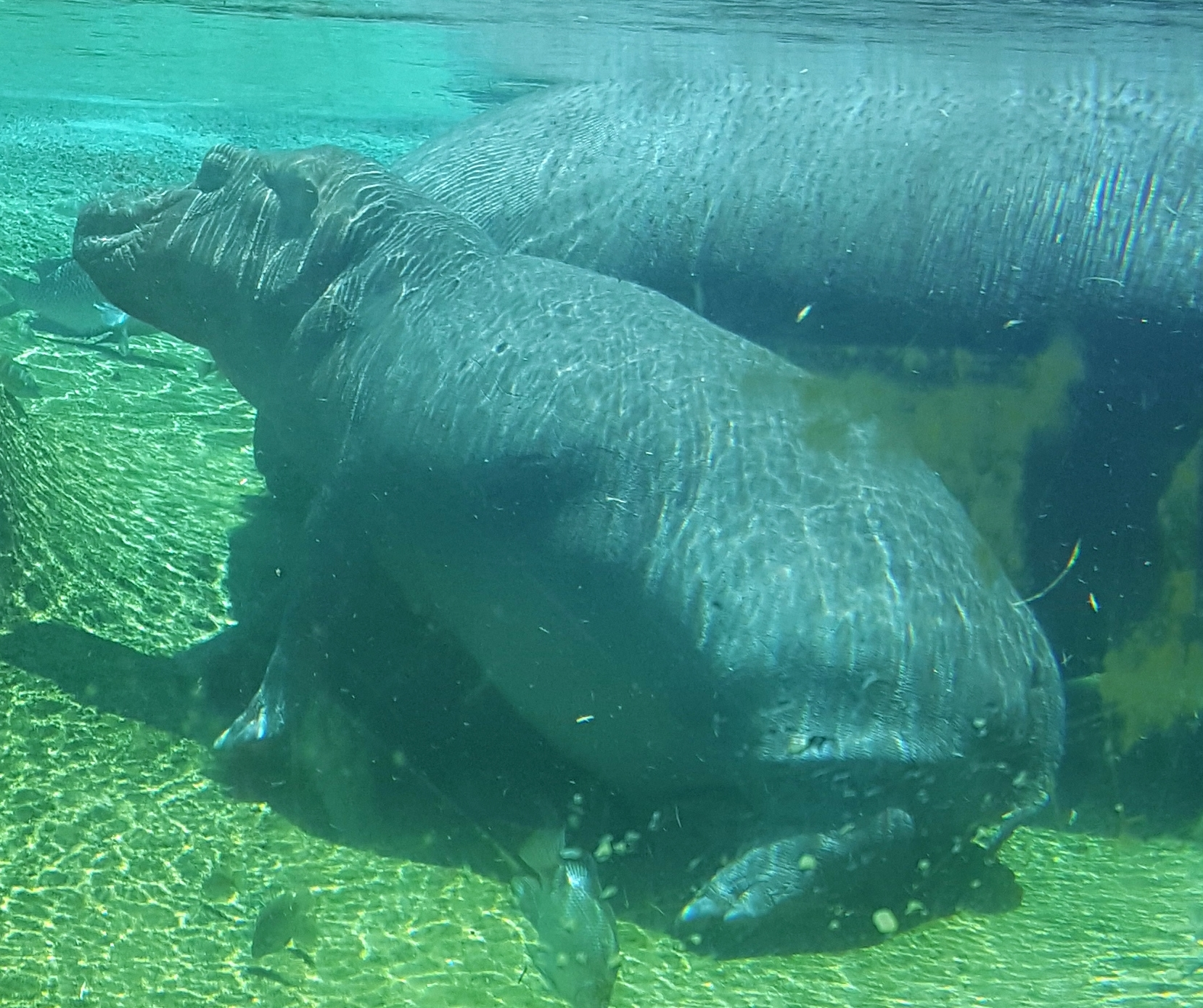
Fiona in Hippo Cove

The baby female hippo, named Fiona by zoo staff, is the first hippo to be born at the zoo in 75 years. Fiona was also the first Nile hippo to ever be captured on an ultrasound image. After intensive care from zoo keepers, veterinarians, and NICU specialists at Cincinnati Children's Hospital, Fiona survived. The story of her trials and success made her an internet celebrity and city hero, and has dramatically increased zoo attendance. Henry's health declined later in 2017 and he was euthanized on October 31. On September 6, 2021, a 19-year-old male named Tucker from the San Francisco Zoo joined the zoo. On August 24, 2022, Bibi gave birth to another calf which weighed roughly 60 pounds. This calf was named Fritz, which was decided through a public vote. Fiona died on November 19, 2026 from complications after ingesting a hat.

=== Painted Dog Valley ===
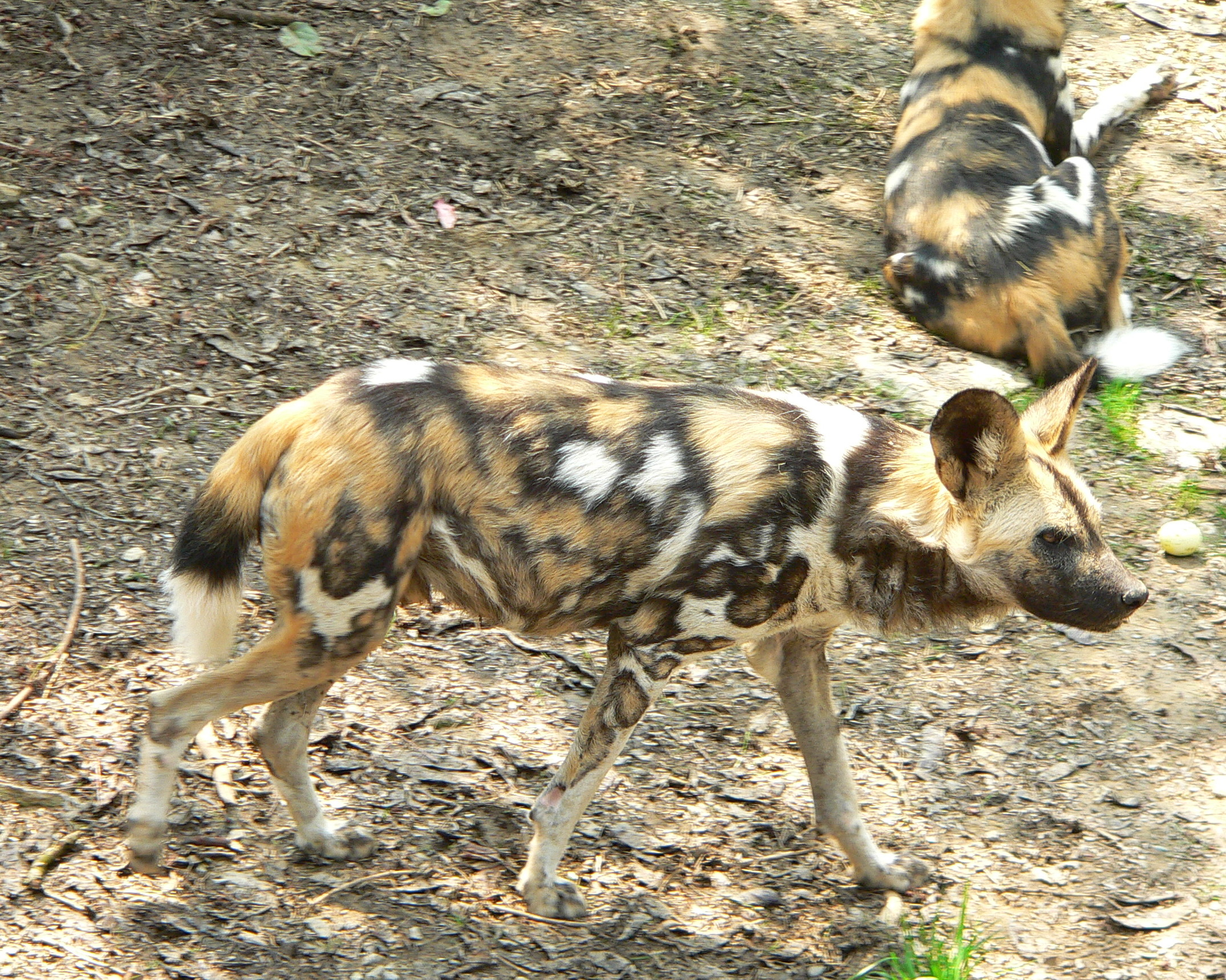
African painted dog at the zoo

- African painted dog
- Meerkat

=== Hippo Cove ===
- Hippopotamus
- Nile tilapia

=== Roo Valley ===
In August 2020, the Cincinnati Zoo finished the first part of their master plan "More Home To Roam". They turned their old Wildlife Canyon exhibit (former home of the critically endangered Sumatran rhino) into an exhibit called Roo Valley, the exhibit features the Zoo's first-ever kangaroo walkabout, with a new beer garden and restaurant, a big rope course over the habitat, and provides the largest outdoor little penguin habitat. Roo Valley adds five new species to the zoo as well, including red and western grey kangaroos, Australian wood ducks, New Zealand scaups and freckled ducks, the latter three species living side by side with the little penguins.

=== African Penguin Point ===
In September 2020, the Cincinnati Zoo finished the second part of the master plan. They turned their old sea lion habitat, sometimes referred to as "Seal Falls" until the passing of Duke the California sea lion in 2019, into a bigger exhibit for their African penguins, increasing their breeding success rate, while at the same time including some other African sea birds like the white-breasted cormorants, great white pelicans, and yellow-billed ducks.

=== Harry and Linda Fath Elephant Trek ===
On June 15, 2021, the Zoo broke ground on the biggest habitat in Zoo history, The Harry and Linda Fath Elephant Trek. The Elephant Trek is five times the size of the Zoo's former elephant habitat. The current exhibit opened on October 1, 2024, and is home to a multi-generational herd of eight Asian elephants, including a family unit from the Dublin Zoo and four elephants that the zoo had before construction. It includes swimming pools, streams, overhead feeding stations, mud wallows, and enrichment opportunities at every turn. These enrichments encourage movement and other natural behaviors. The herd of eight can access three different yards that serve different purposes and can accommodate separation for training and medical procedures. It is also home to Vietnamese pheasants and Azure-winged magpies.

Phase 2 opened on April 14, 2025, and includes Siamang’s Point, a rhinoceros hornbill exhibit, Asian small-clawed otters and a Babirusa for the Clawed River Otter Habitat and the New Picnic Shelter Complex.

== Center for Conservation and Research of Endangered Wildlife (CREW) ==
The Cincinnati Zoo has been active in breeding animals to help save species, starting as early as 1880 with the first hatching of a trumpeter swan in a zoo, as well as four passenger pigeons. This was followed in 1882 with the first American bison born in captivity.

In 1986, the zoo established the Carl H. Lindner Jr. Family Center for Conservation and Research of Endangered Wildlife for the purpose of using science and technology to understand, preserve, and propagate endangered flora and fauna and facilitate the conservation of global biodiversity. Its Frozen Zoo plays a major role. In it are stored over 2,500 specimens representing approximately 60 animal and 65 plant species. Terri Roth is CREW's director.

The zoo's breeding programs have been associated with the nicknames "world's sexiest zoo" and the "sexiest zoo in America" in media coverage".

== Notable animals ==
Animals housed at the zoo have included an American alligator reported to be approximately 70 years old, a cheetah described as the fastest in captivity, and a Komodo dragon reported as the largest in confinement. The zoo was the first in the United States to put an aye-aye on display, and after losing its last aye-aye in 1993, it finally acquired another in 2011 – a six-year old transferred from the Duke Lemur Center in North Carolina.

The zoo is one of only a dozen in North America to house and breed bonobos (also known as pygmy chimpanzees), an endangered species of the great apes.

On January 6 and 7, the zoo celebrated the birth of its first babies of 2020. Two penguin chicks hatched, one each day.

=== Martha ===
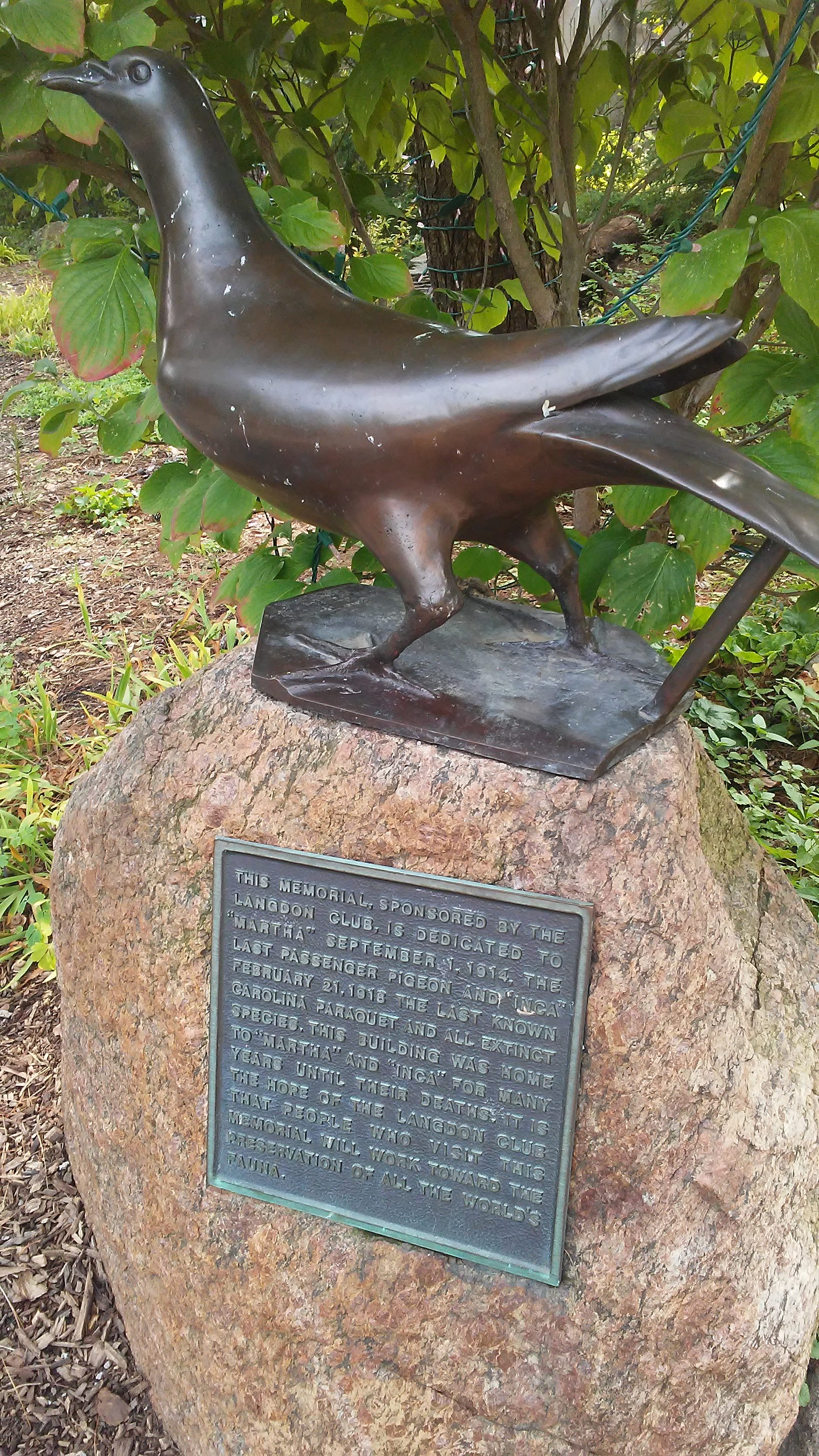
The statue of Martha outside of pagoda that is believed to have housed her and Incas

Martha was the last passenger pigeon housed at the Cincinnati Zoo. She was named after Martha Washington, the very first First lady of the United States of America. Following the death of her last mate on July 10, 1910, Martha became the sole passenger pigeon of the zoo and the last known individual of her species. She became one of the most famous individuals in the zoo due to her status as the species' endling and the $1,000 reward ($33,000 in 2024) for a successful capture of another living individual. On September 1, 1914, Martha died of natural causes and following her death, the passenger pigeons were declared extinct. Since then, Martha's body has been taxidermised and is currently on display at the Smithsonian's Wonders of the World exhibit. Outside of the building that is believed to have housed Martha, a statue of her was built to immortalise her and Incas, the last known Carolina parakeet and to raise awareness of conservation to prevent similar species from meeting the same fates as Martha and Incas.

=== Incas ===
Incas was the last known Carolina parakeet, and similar to Martha, he was housed at the Cincinnati Zoo. He was brought to the zoo in 1885 as part of a captive breeding programme to establish a population. He had a mate named Lady Jane, but they were unsuccessful in producing offspring. In the Summer of 1917, Lady Jane died which led to Incas becoming very depressed and mournful. In the evening of February 21, 1918, Incas died of abnormal freezing temperatures at the age of 33. However, unlike Martha, the location of the remains of Incas are unknown with possibilities that he may be on display unlabelled at the Cincinnati Museum of Natural History.

=== Susie ===
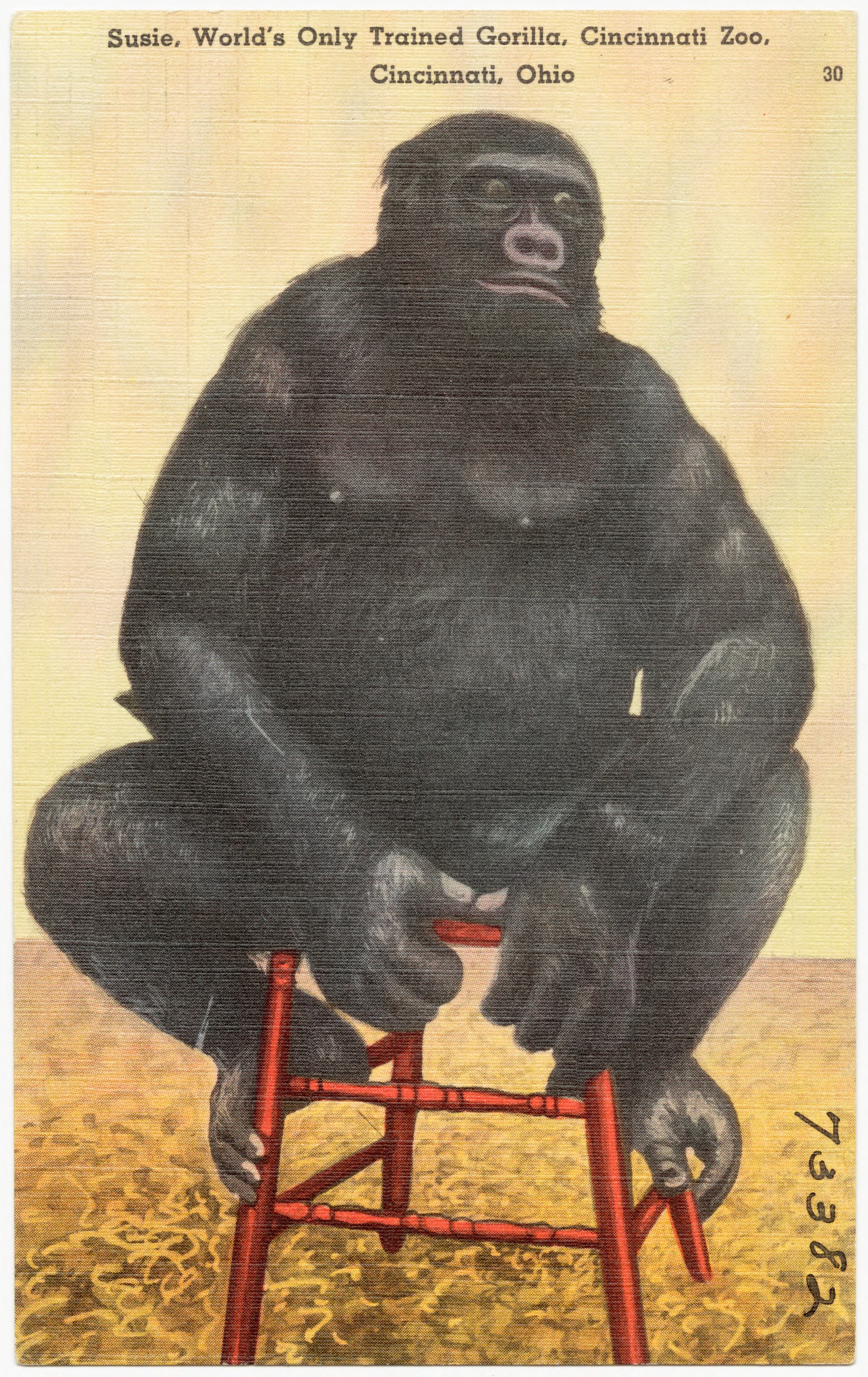
Susie on a postcard

In 1931, Robert J. Sullivan permanently loaned the zoo a female eastern gorilla named Susie. Captured in the Belgian Congo, Susie was first sold to a group of French explorers who sent her to France. In August 1929, Susie was transported from Europe to the United States aboard the airship Graf Zeppelin accompanied by William Dressman. After Susie completed a tour through the United States and Canada with Ringling Bros. and Barnum & Bailey Circus, Sullivan purchased Susie for $4,500 and loaned her to the zoo. Dressman, who stayed on as Susie's trainer after she was loaned to the zoo, taught her how eat with a knife and fork and orchestrated two performances every day. Susie was so popular that on her birthday on August 7, 1936, more than 16,000 visitors flocked to the zoo. Susie remained one of the most popular animals at the zoo until her death on October 29, 1947. Her body was "unceremoniously mounted and stuffed" after death, and donated to the University of Cincinnati. Her skeleton was on display until it was destroyed in a fire in 1974.

=== Harambe ===
On May 28, 2016, Harambe, a 17-year-old, 200-kilogram (440 lb) male western lowland gorilla, was fatally shot by zoo officials after a three-year-old boy climbed into Harambe's enclosure. The incident was recorded by a bystander and uploaded to YouTube, where the video went viral. Zoo director Thane Maynard stated, "The child was being dragged around ... His head was banging on concrete. This was not a gentle thing. The child was at risk." The shooting was controversial, with some observers stating that it was not clear whether or not Harambe was likely to harm the child. Others called for the boy's parents and/or the zoo to be held accountable for the gorilla's death.

The boy was transported to the hospital with non-life-threatening injuries after being rescued. Police investigated possible criminal charges, while the parents of the boy defended the zoo's actions. The incident received global publicity; comedian and actor Ricky Gervais, rock guitarist and astrophysicist Brian May, and journalist and television personality Piers Morgan criticized the shooting, while real estate developer and then-presidential candidate Donald Trump and zoo director and notable animal expert Jack Hanna both lamented the shooting but defended the zoo's decision to prioritize the boy's safety.

=== Fiona ===
In January 2017, the zoo had its first birth of a hippopotamus in 75 years. Named Fiona, she was born six weeks prematurely and her survival was in doubt. At the time of her birth, she weighed only 29 pounds, which was 25 pounds less than the lowest recorded birthweight for her species. The zoo's efforts to save her and her subsequent improvement to good health provided a viral sensation on the internet. At the age of four, Fiona weighed 1,600 pounds. Fiona died in November 2026 from complications after ingesting a hat.

=== Gallery ===
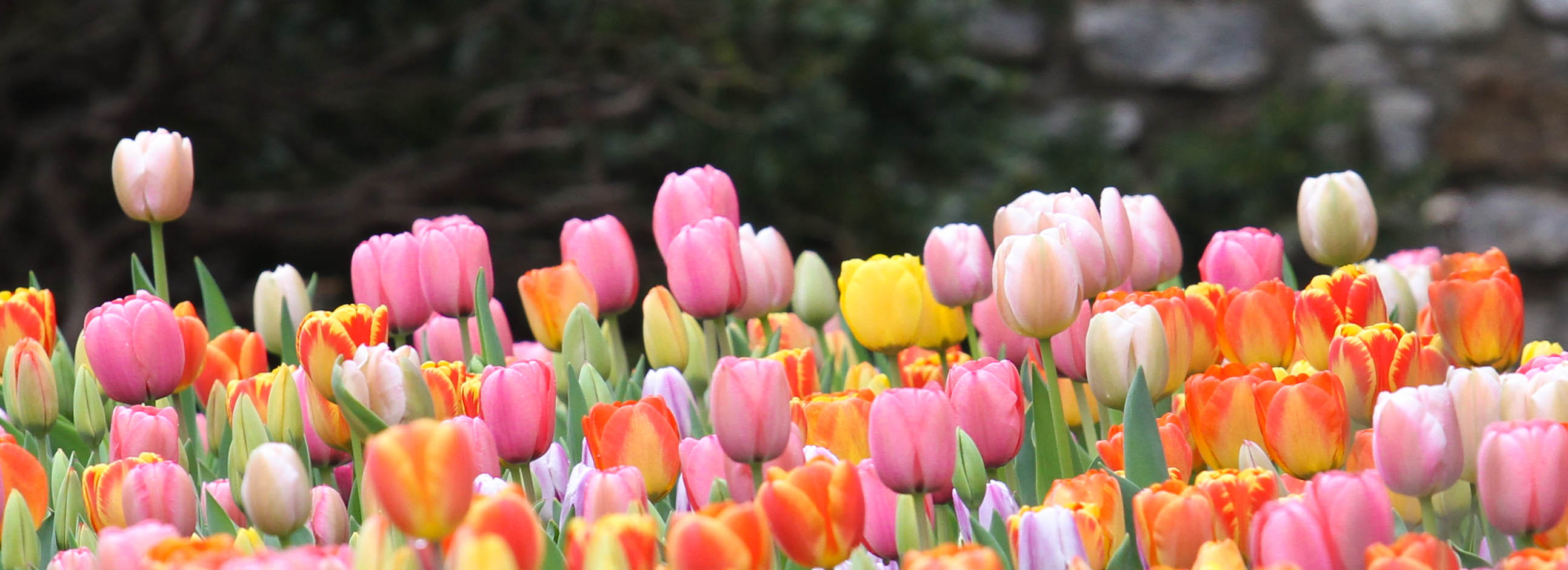
Various tulips in the gardens

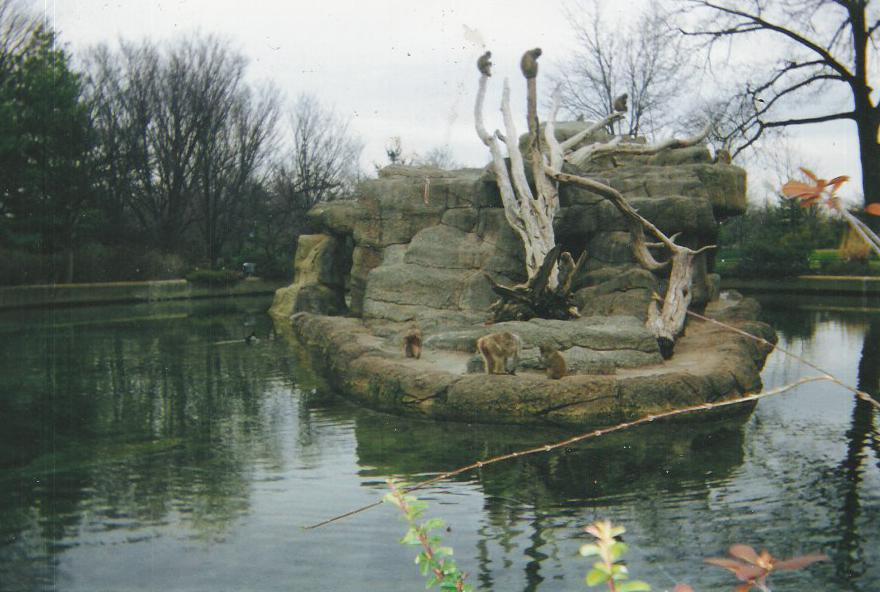
Japanese macaques on one of the zoo's "monkey islands"

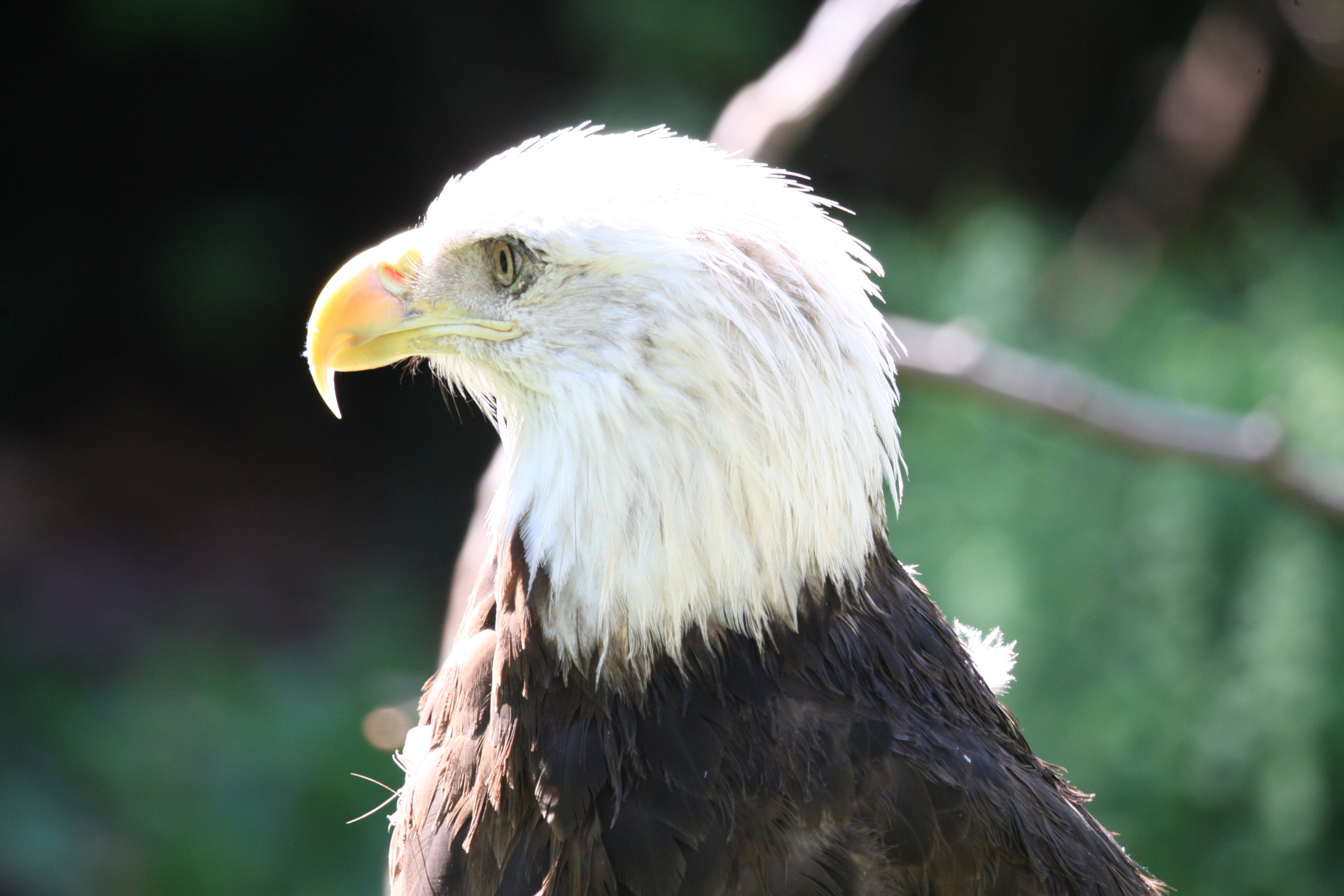
Bald eagle at the zoo

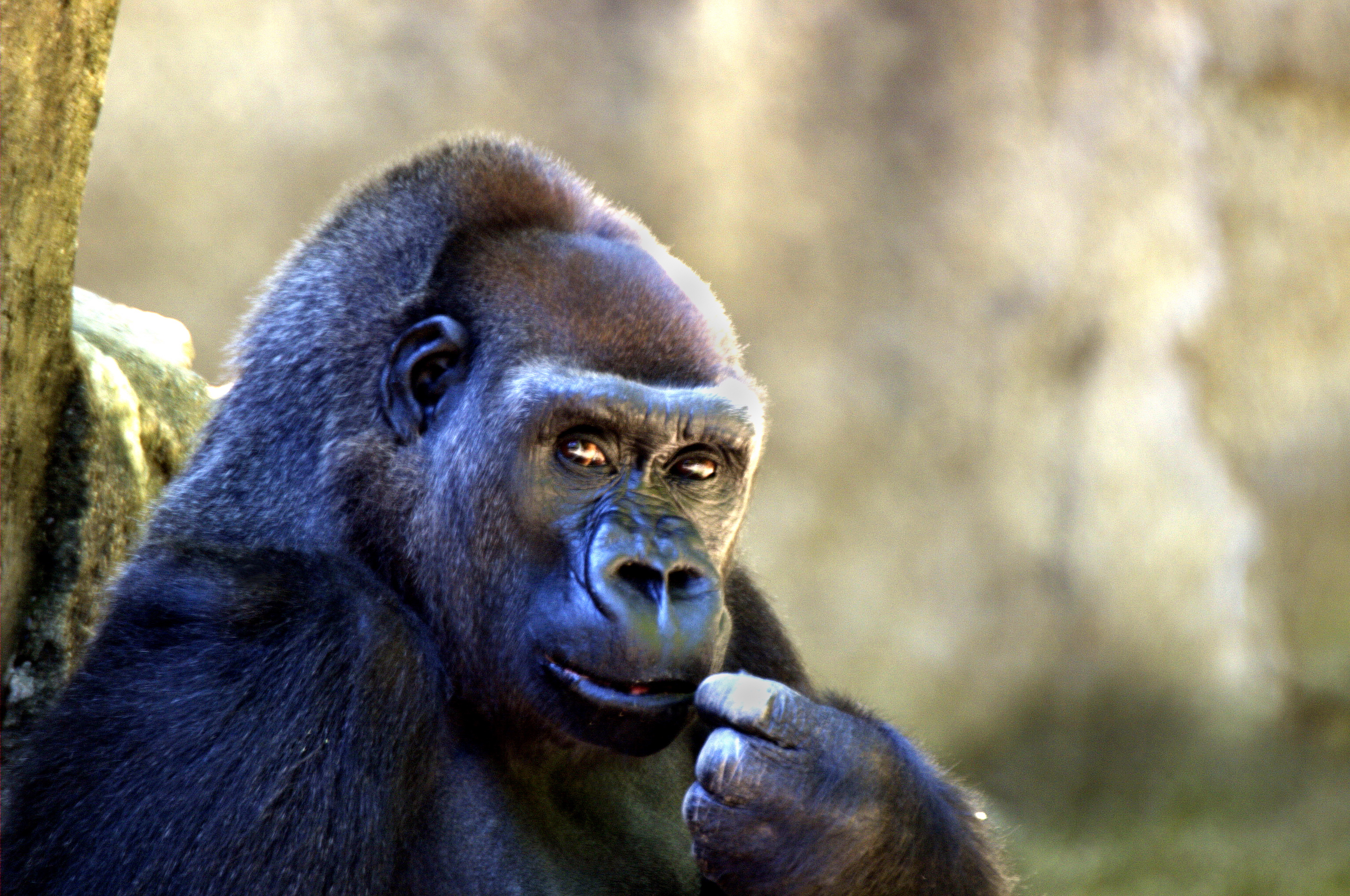
Gorilla at the zoo

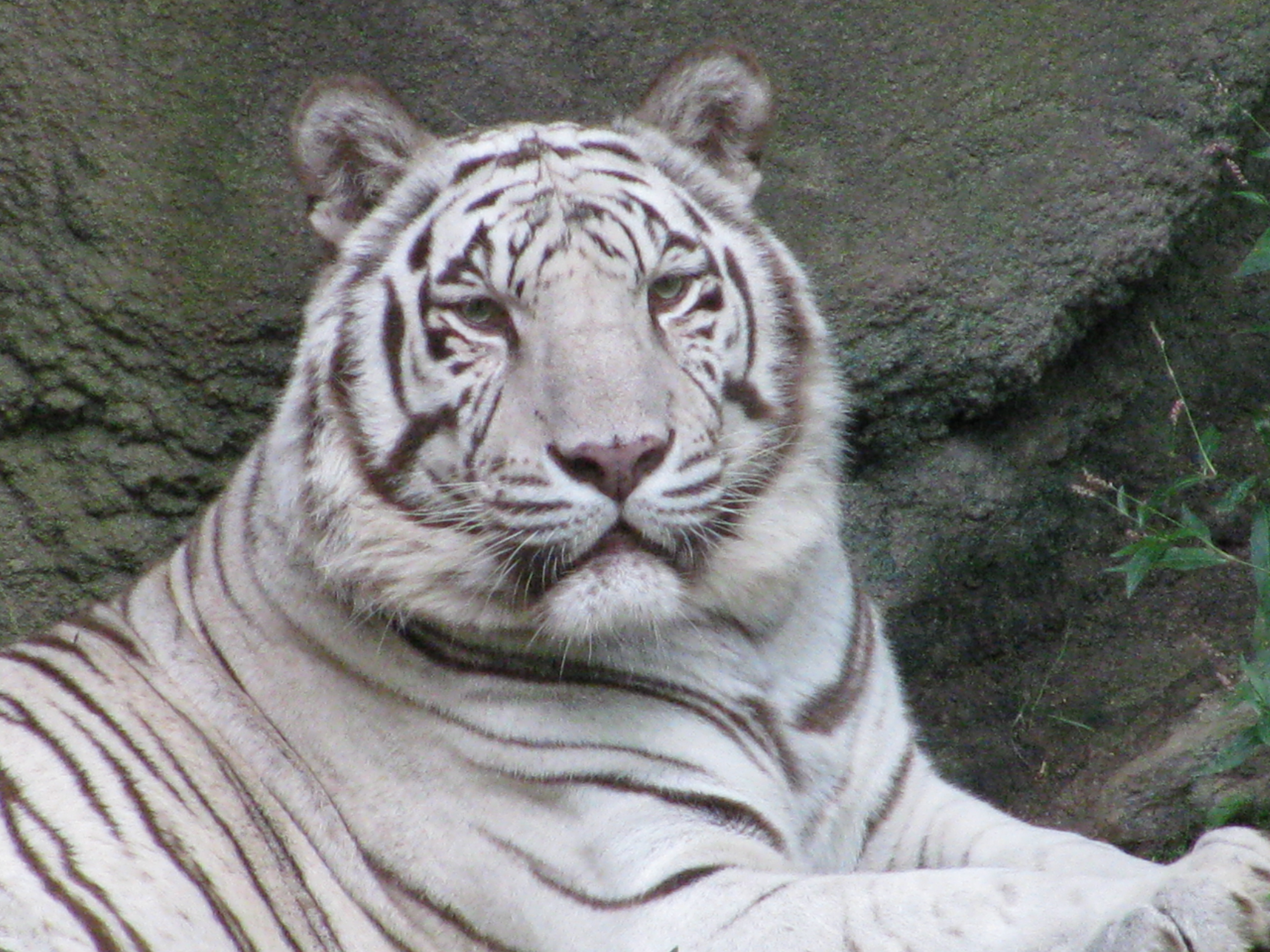
White tiger

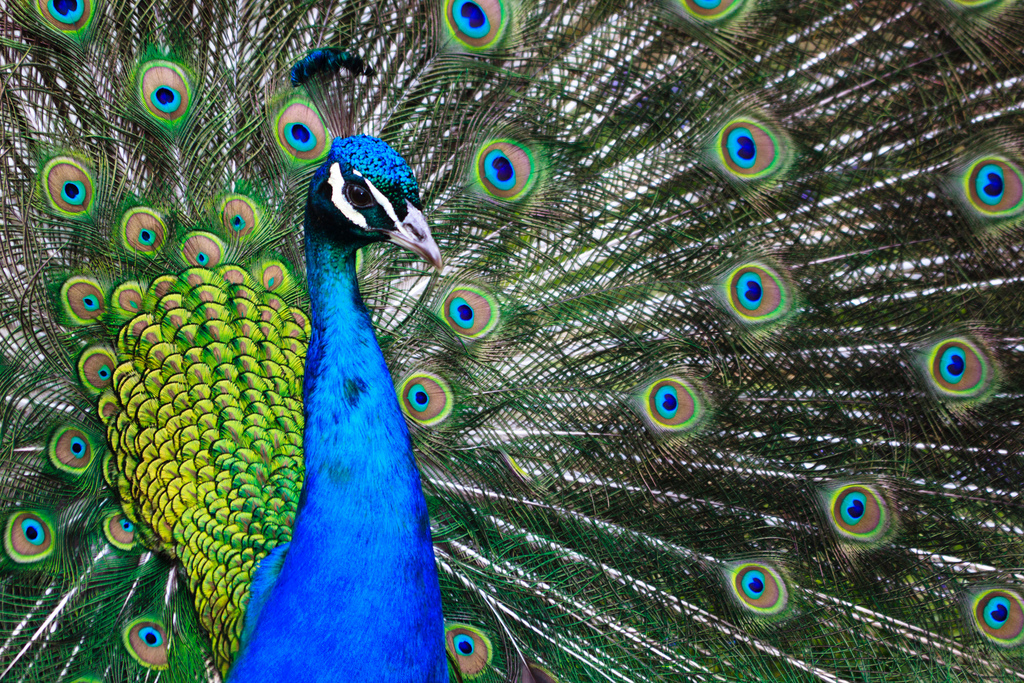
Indian Peafowl

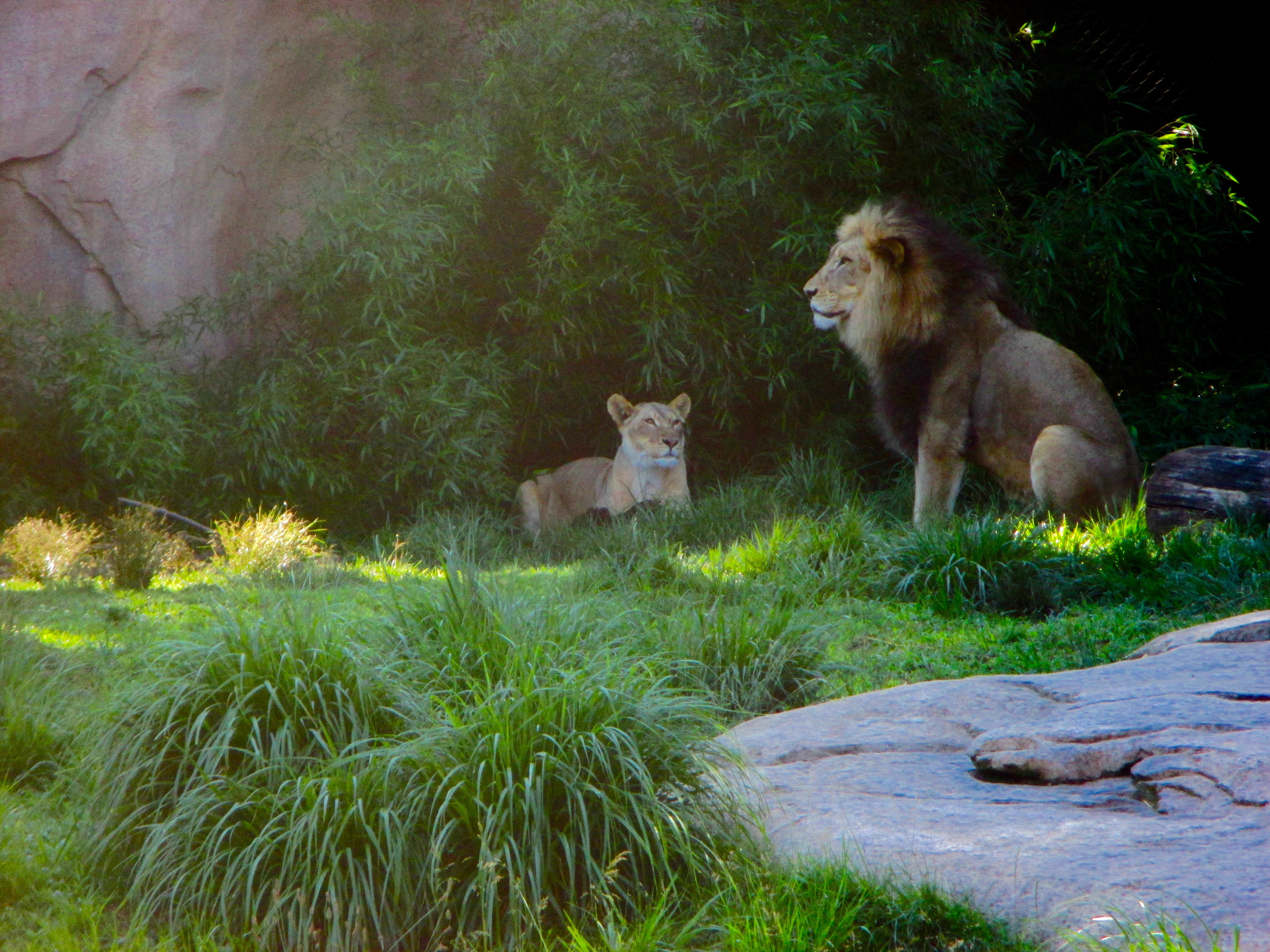
Lions in an exhibit

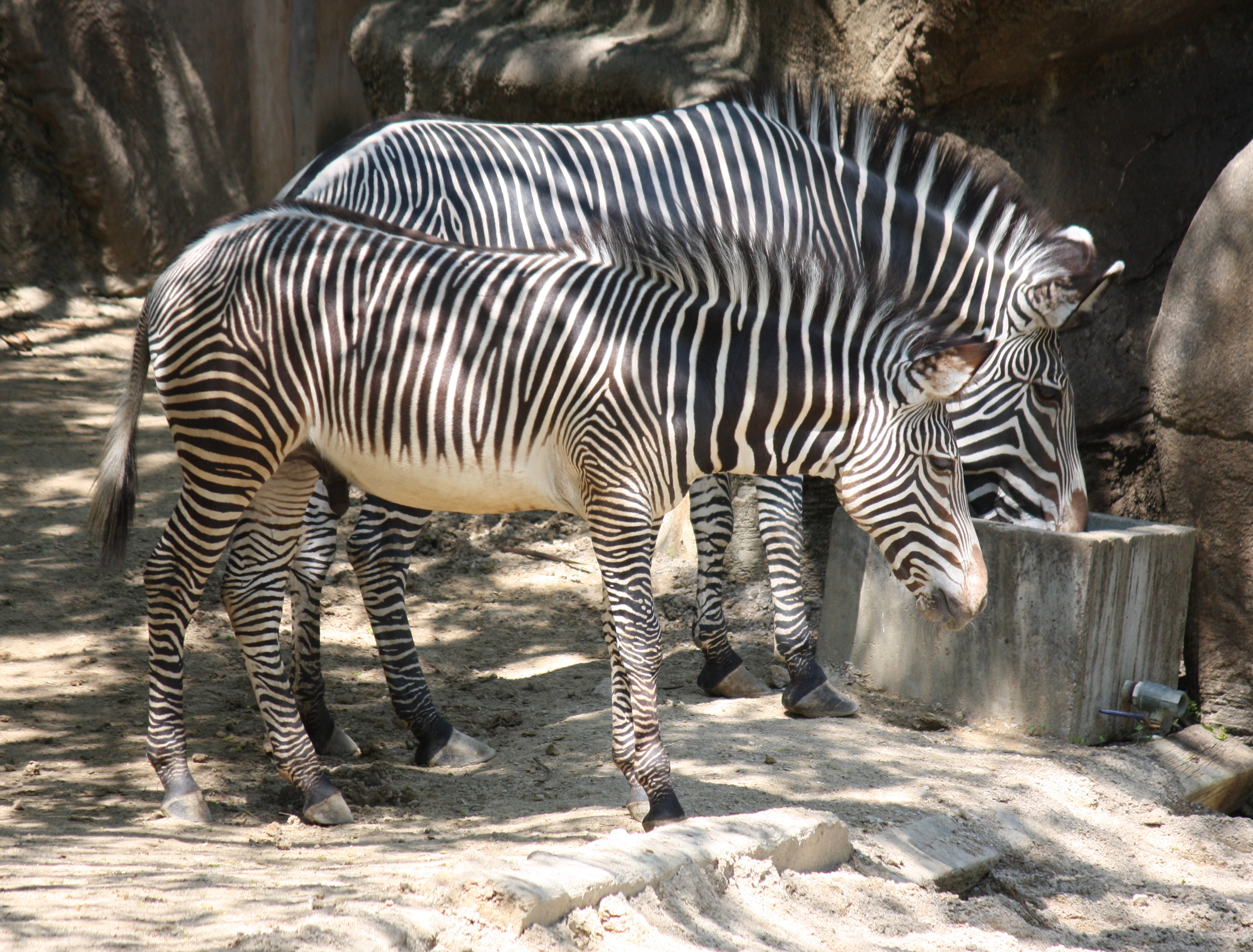
Grevy's Zebra (Equus grevyi)

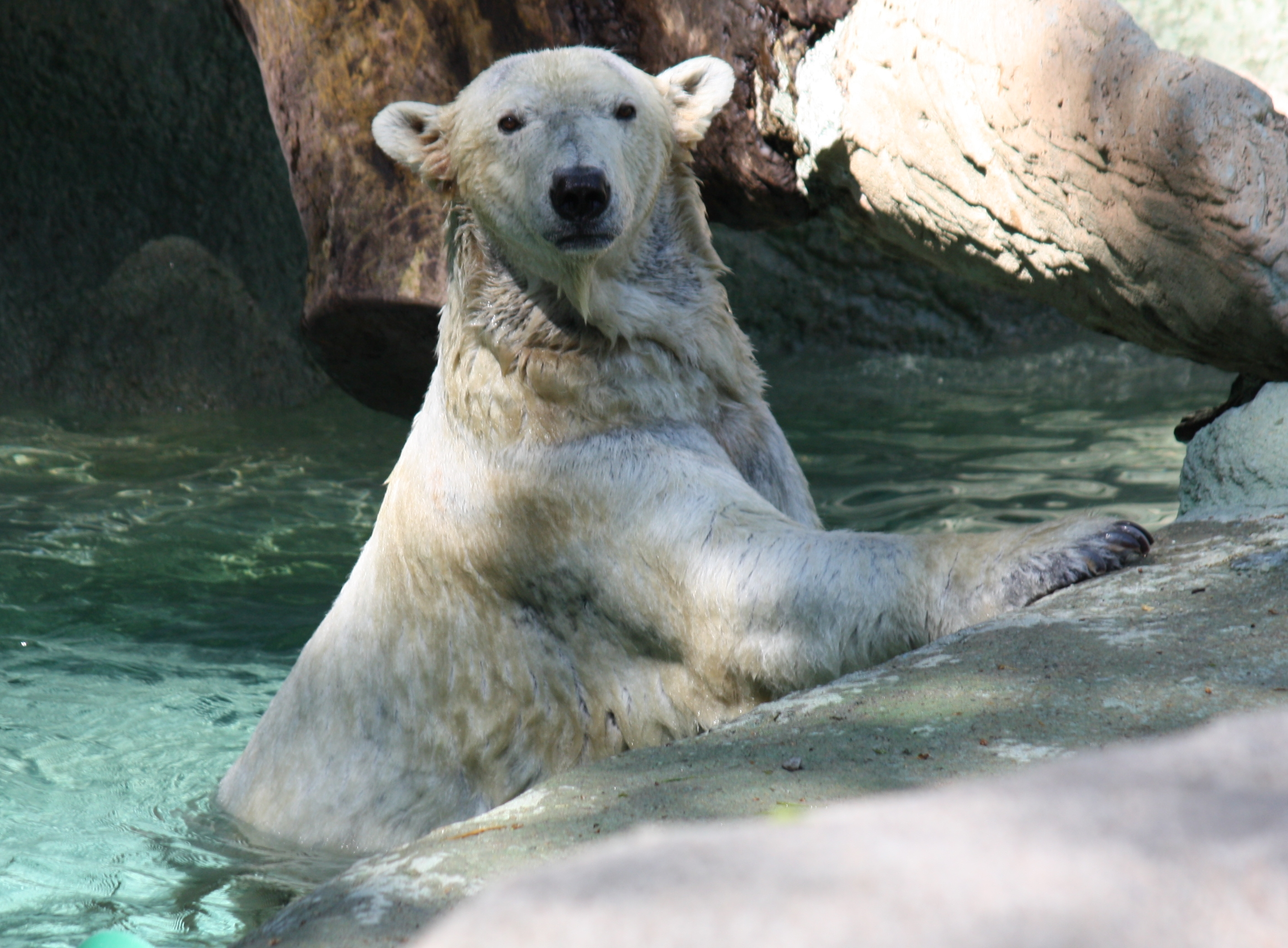
Polar Bear (Ursus maritimus)

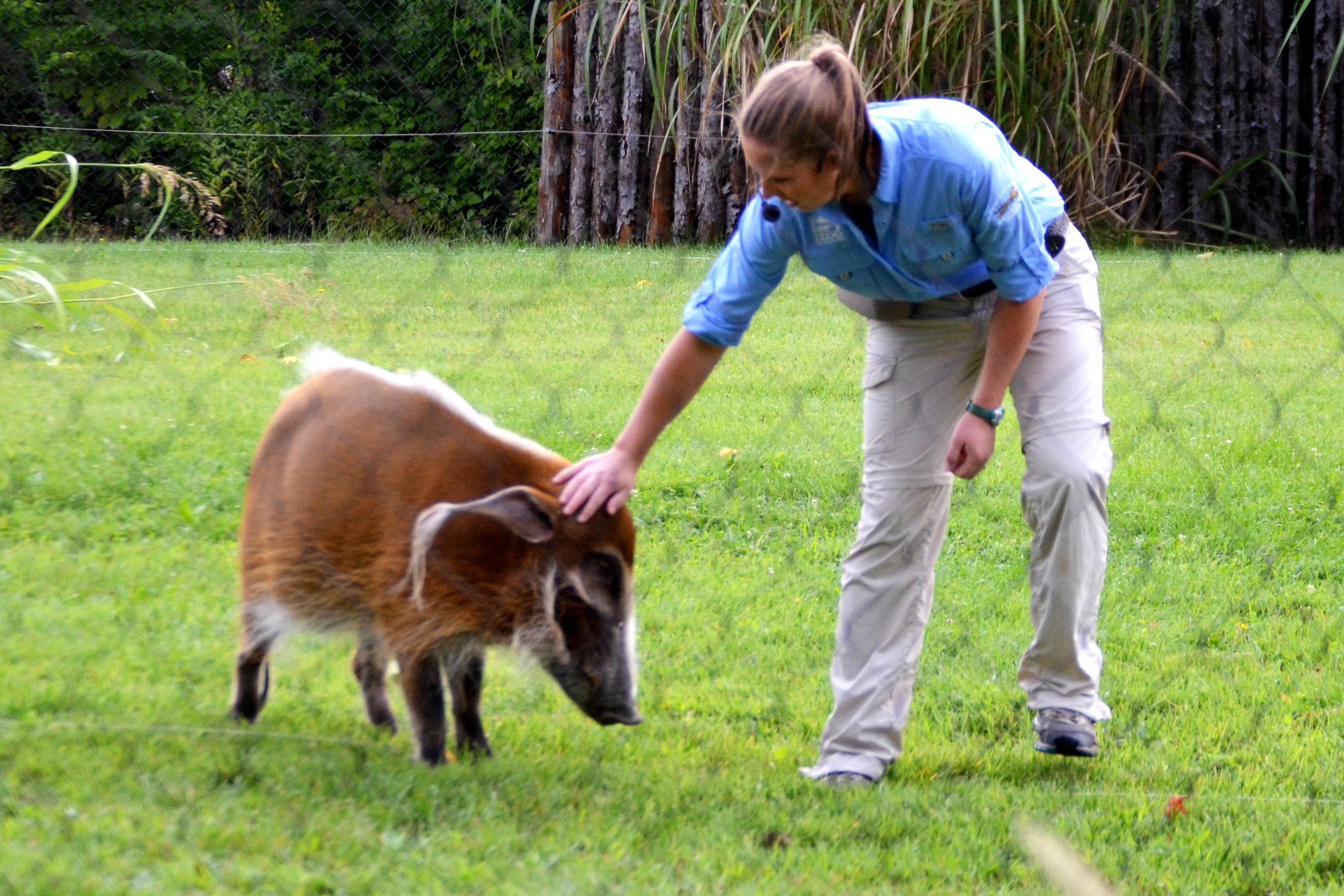
Good Red River Hog with trainer

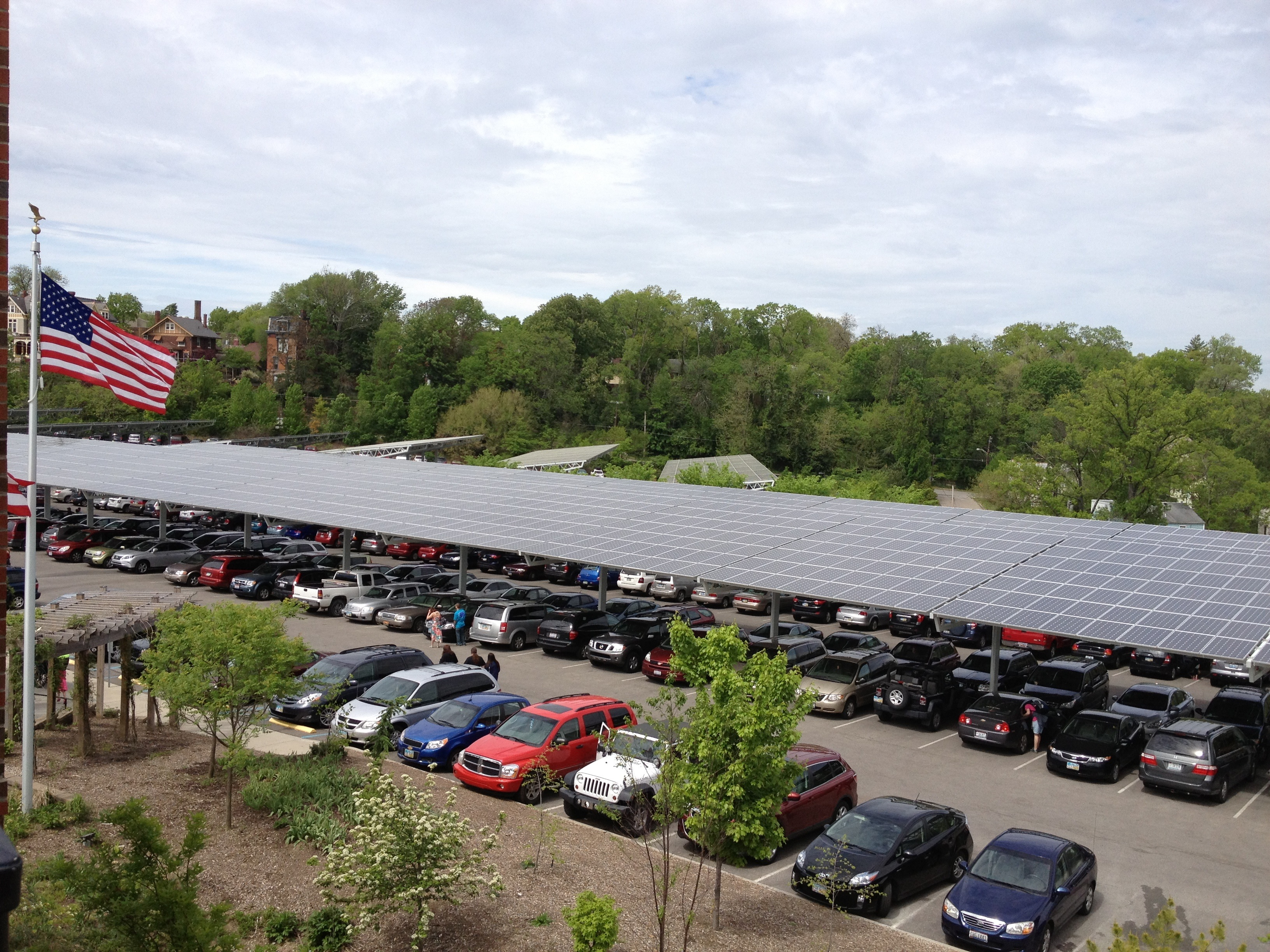
Solar panel canopies over parking lots

== See also ==
- Binti Jua
- Cincinnati Zoo Historic Structures
- List of botanical gardens and arboretums in the United States
- Sarah (cheetah)
- Martha (passenger pigeon)
- Incas (Carolina parakeet)
