= Kemper Log House =

Coordinates: 39.279845°N 84.399283°W

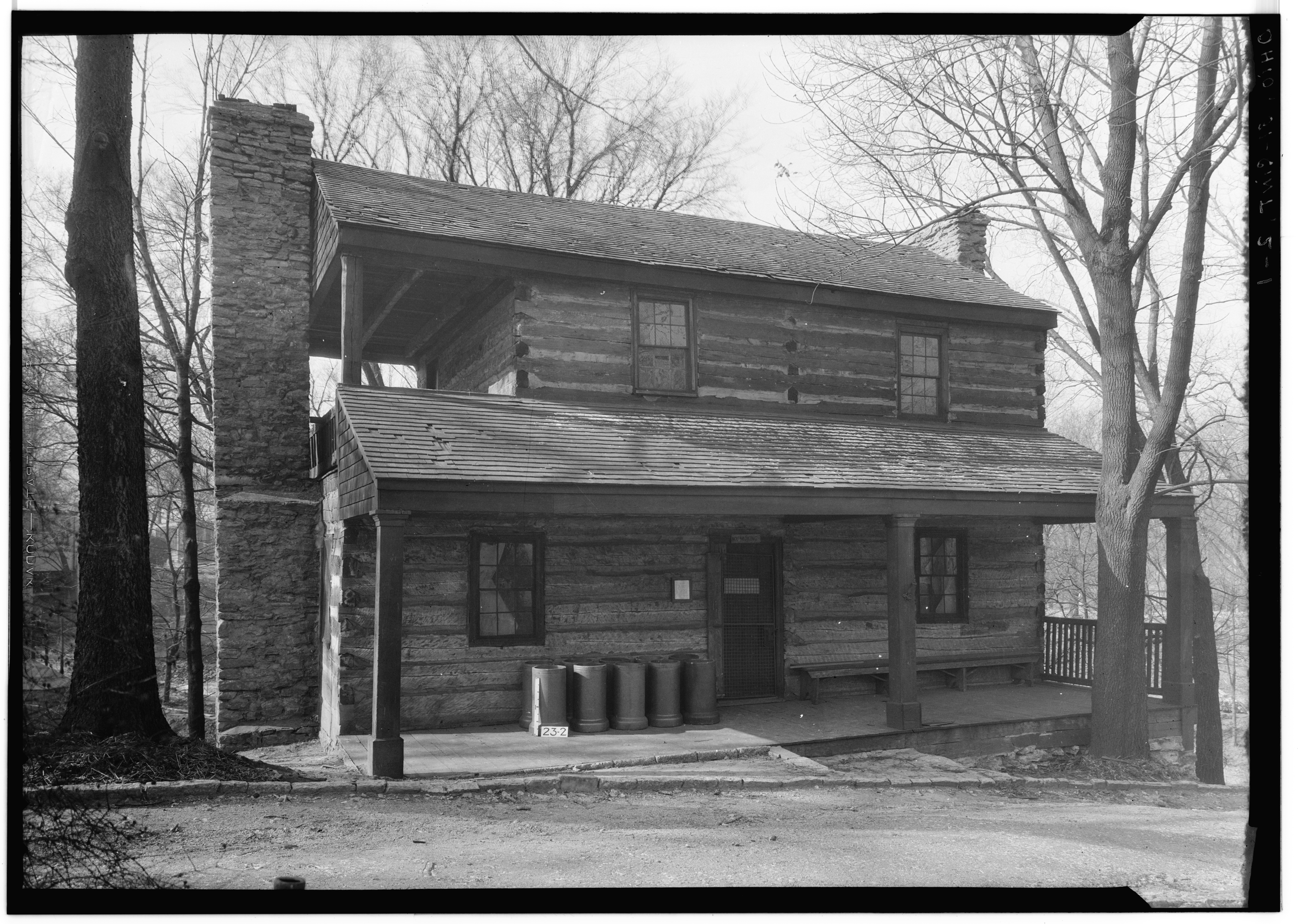
Front view of Kemper Log House

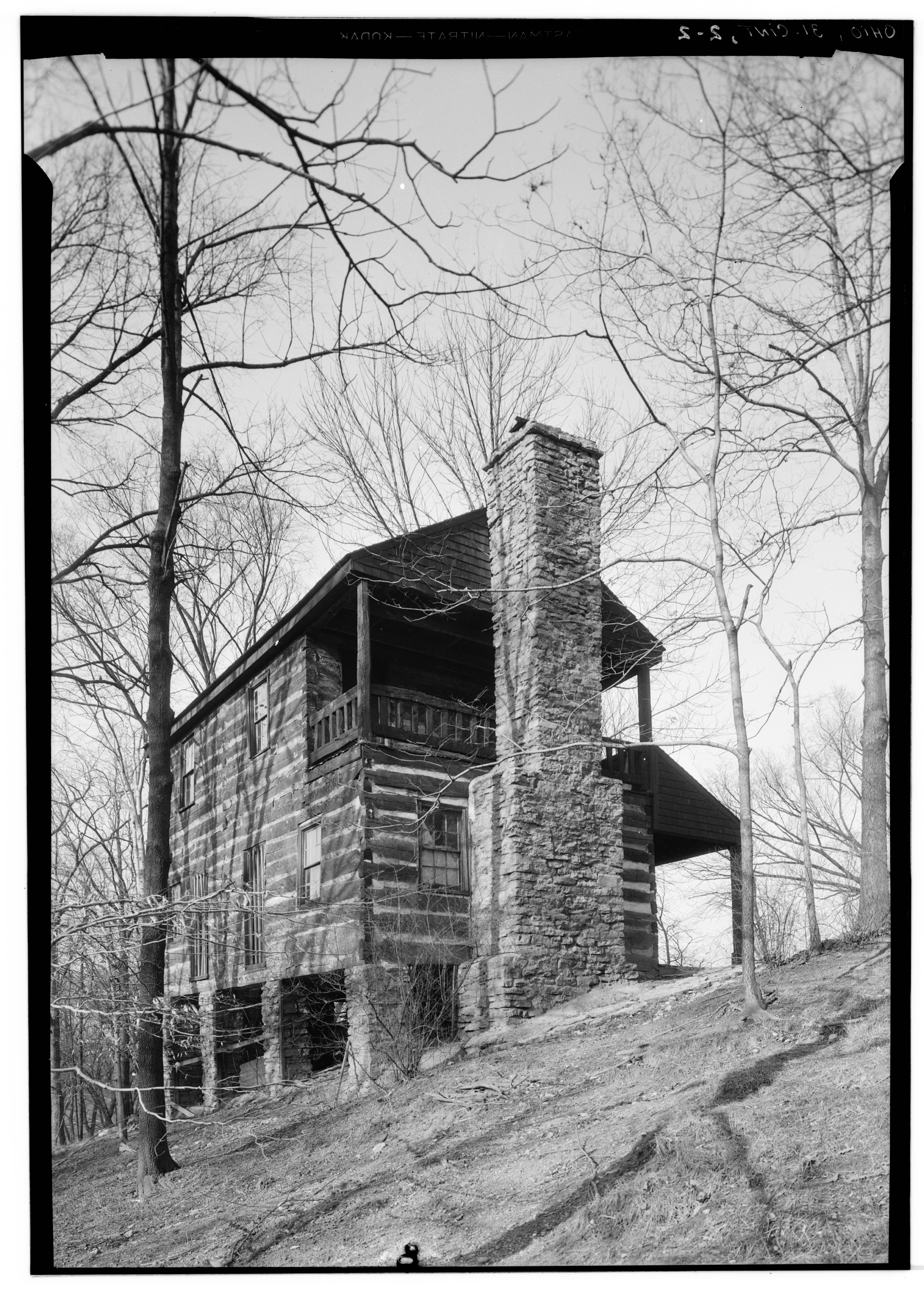
Side view of Kemper Log House

The Kemper Log House is a two-story, double pen log house, which was built in 1804 by the Reverend James Kemper on Kemper Lane, in the Walnut Hills neighborhood. It was occupied by members of the Kemper family until 1897. It is one of the oldest houses built in Cincinnati, Ohio that is still standing. The house was moved in 1912 to the Cincinnati Zoo and then relocated at Heritage Village Museum in Sharon Woods. Its operation is coordinated with Historic Southwest Ohio, which maintains the village.
