= Langdon House =

Historic house in Ohio, United States

- U.S. National Register of Historic Places
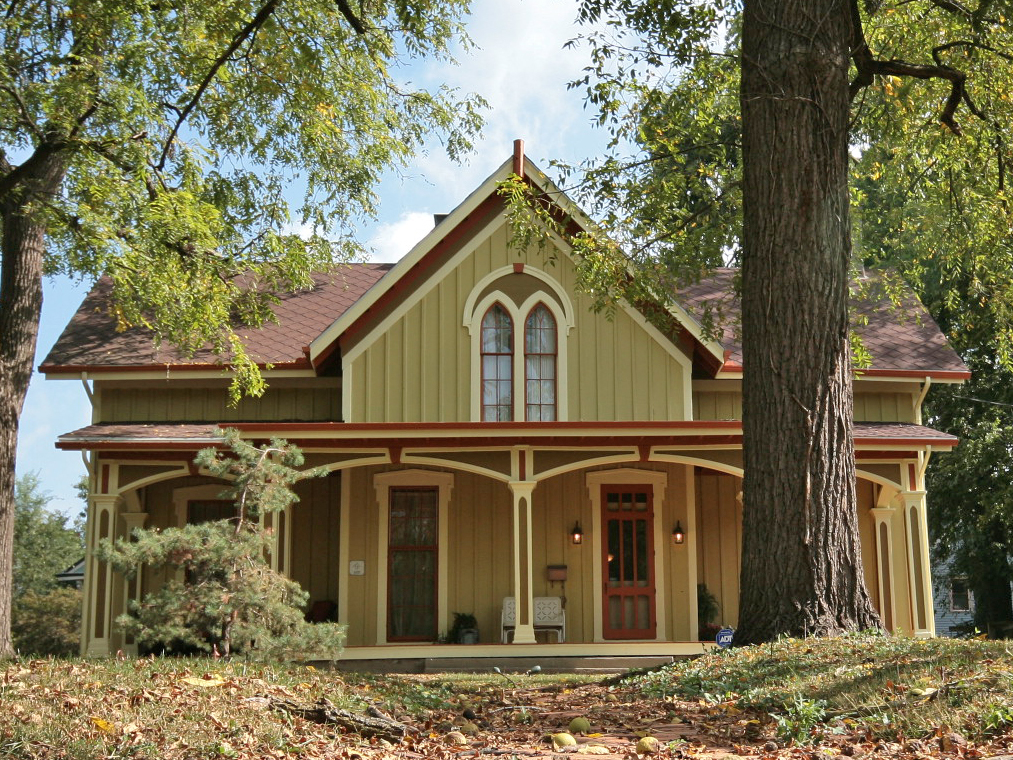
- Front of the house

- Location within Ohio Location within the United States
- Location: 3626 Eastern Ave., Cincinnati, Ohio
- Coordinates: 39°6′49″N 84°26′14″W
- Area: Less than 1 acre (0.40 ha)
- Built: 1855
- Architectural style: Steamboat Gothic
- NRHP reference No.: 69000143
- Added to NRHP: April 16, 1969

The Langdon House is a historic house on the eastern side of Cincinnati, Ohio, United States. Located along Eastern Avenue, it is a frame house with weatherboarded walls, built in the Steamboat Gothic style. It was erected in 1855 in the village of Columbia, which has since been annexed to the city of Cincinnati. Seven years after it was constructed, its owner, Henry Langdon, joined the 79th Ohio Infantry to fight in the Civil War. After his return in 1865, Langdon returned to his Columbia house; there he maintained a medical practice until his 1876 death.

In 1969, the Langdon House was listed on the National Register of Historic Places. Key to its inclusion is its unusually well-preserved historic architecture: almost no other Steamboat Gothic houses remain in Cincinnati.
