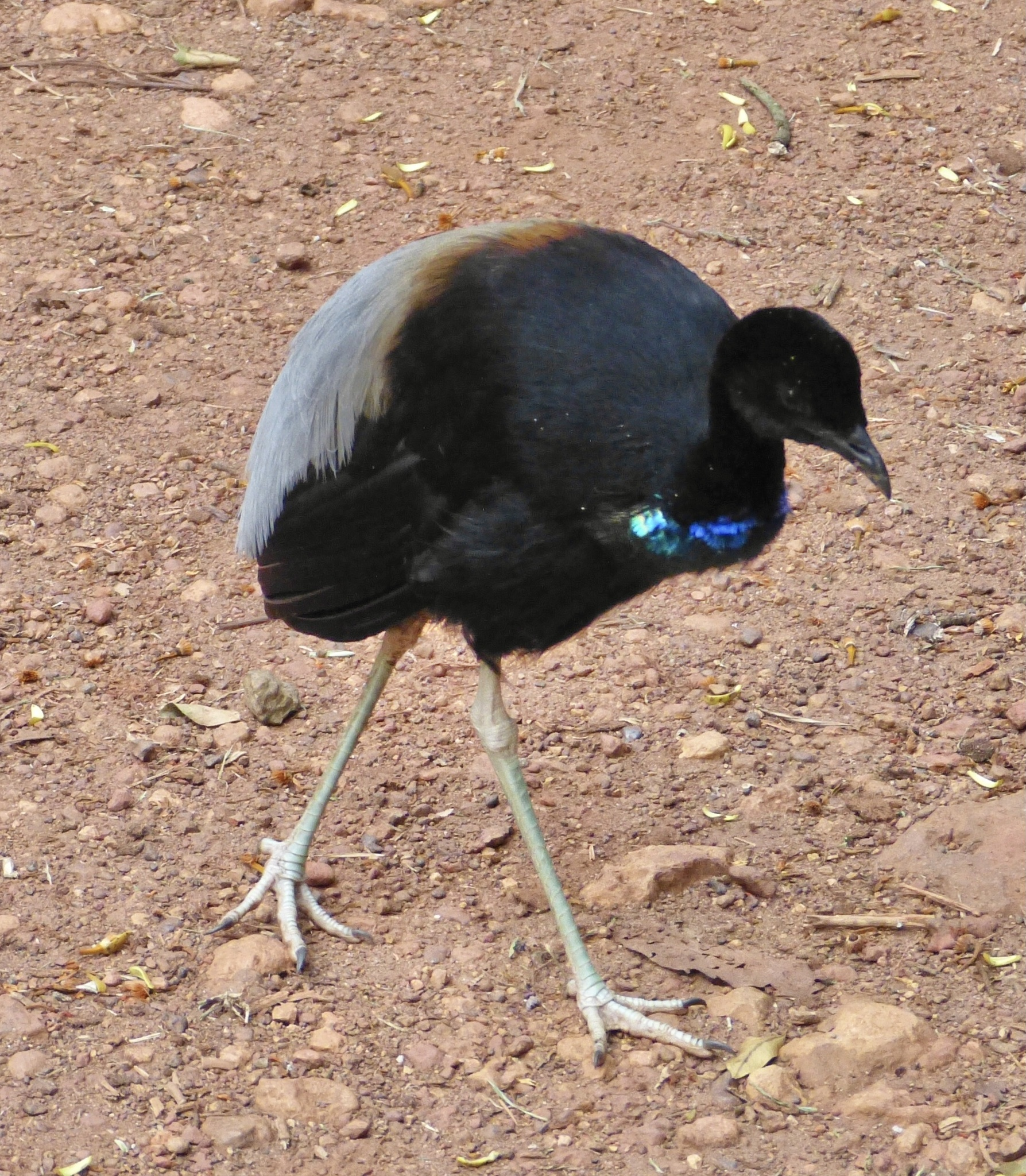
- Nominate P. c. crepitans in Brokopondo, Suriname

Conservation status
- Least Concern (IUCN 3.1)

- Least Concern (IUCN 3.1)

Scientific classification
- Kingdom: Animalia
- Phylum: Chordata
- Class: Aves
- Order: Gruiformes
- Family: Psophiidae
- Genus: Psophia
- Species: P. crepitans

Binomial name
- Psophia crepitans Linnaeus, 1758

= Grey-winged trumpeter =

Species of forest bird from the Amazon

The grey-winged trumpeter (Psophia crepitans) is a member of a small family of birds, the Psophiidae. It is found in Brazil, Colombia, Ecuador, French Guiana, Guyana, northern Peru, Suriname, and Venezuela, north of the Amazon River.

== Taxonomy ==
The grey-winged trumpeter was formally described in 1758 by the Swedish naturalist Carl Linnaeus in the tenth edition of his Systema Naturae under current the binomial name Psophia crepitans. Linnaeus based his account on the earlier description by the French naturalist Pierre Barrère. Linnaeus specified the type locality as "America meridionali" but this is now restricted to Cayenne in French Guiana based on Barrère. The specific epithet is Latin meaning "breaking wind" or "resounding".

The grey-winged trumpeter's taxonomy is unsettled. The International Ornithological Committee (IOC), the South American Classification Committee of the American Ornithological Society, and the Clements taxonomy recognise three subspecies:

- P. c. crepitans Linnaeus, 1758 – Venezuela and southeast Colombia through the Guianas and north Brazil
- P. c. napensis Sclater, PL & Salvin, 1873 – southeast Colombia to northeast Peru and northwest Brazil
- P. c. ochroptera Pelzeln, 1857 – central north Brazil

Some authors treat P. c. ochroptera as a subspecies of the pale-winged trumpeter (P. leucoptera), and BirdLife International's Handbook of the Birds of the World treats it as a separate species, the ochre-winged trumpeter. In addition, there has been some suggestion that the other two subspecies also warrant treatment as species. This article follows the three-subspecies model.

== Description ==
The grey-winged trumpeter is a chicken-like bird with a long neck and legs and a hump-backed profile. It is 45 to 52 centimetres (18 to 20 in) long. Two males weighed 0.82 and 1.02 kg (1.8 and 2.2 lb) and six females weighed between 0.79 and 1.06 kg (1.7 and 2.3 lb). The sexes are similar in appearance. Their stout, slightly decurved, bill is yellowish-green and their legs and feet greenish-olive. Their plumage is mostly black. The nominate subspecies has green or violet iridescence on the lower neck. Its inner wings and rump are ashy grey and the middle of the back is ochre to chestnut. Subspecies P. c. napensis has bronzy or purple iridescence, lighter grey wings and rump, and a more ferruginous back, and P. c. ochroptera has entirely ochraceous wings, rump, and middle back. The newly hatched chicks have russet-brown down with pale lines along the back giving good camouflage.

== Distribution and habitat ==
The grey-winged trumpeter is a bird of the northern Amazon Basin. The nominate subspecies is found from southeastern Colombia east through eastern and southern Venezuela and the Guianas and south into Brazil to the Amazon River east of the Rio Negro. P. c. ochroptera is found in northwestern Brazil north of the Amazon and west of the Rio Negro. P. c. napensis is found from southeastern Colombia south through eastern Ecuador into northeastern Peru and east into extreme northwestern Brazil north of the Amazon.

The grey-winged trumpeter inhabits dense lowland tropical rainforest. Within that broad category it favours landscapes away from human habitations and with an open understory and many fruiting trees. Despite being mostly a bird of the lowlands it sometimes can be found in higher elevation cloudforest.

== Behaviour ==
The grey-winged trumpeter is a gregarious species that lives in flocks of up to about 15 birds of all ages. Each flock maintains a territory that varies between 58–88 ha (140–220 acres). Being weak flyers, they spend most of their time on the ground foraging for food. At night, they roost low in the canopy in trees.

=== Movement ===
The grey-winged trumpeter is entirely non-migratory and tends to move only within its flock territories. It does not cross major rivers.

=== Feeding ===
Adult grey-winged trumpeters feed mostly on soft fruit that has fallen to the forest floor. Though much of it has been knocked loose or picked and dropped by squirrel monkeys or arboreal birds, it tends to persist so the trumpeters do not need follow monkey troops. Fruits eaten are usually those of large trees but trumpeters will pick fruit from shrubs as well. About 10% of their diet is small arthropods, some of which they capture when following army ant swarms. Chicks are fed a greater percentage of arthropods when young. Adults also eat small vertebrates but only rarely.

=== Breeding ===
Grey-winged trumpeters are polyandrous and cooperative breeders. Up to three males mate with the dominant female of the flock, and all members contribute to raising the young. The species usually nests in holes in trees that have been excavated by other species, and sometimes also in natural breaks where for instance a trunk has split. They do not build a nest in the hole. They apparently time their breeding so the eggs hatch at the beginning of the local rainy season when fruit, and especially insects, are abundant. The clutch size is two to four eggs but usually three.

=== Voice ===
All trumpeters are highly vocal. The grey-winged trumpeter's song is a low humming "wuh-wuh-wuh wuh wuh - -". Its alarm call is "loud, harsh 'GRAH' notes".

== In captivity ==
Indigenous peoples tame trumpeters as sentinels because of their predator-spotting ability and loud alarm call; they are also thought to kill snakes.

A captive grey-winged trumpeter named Trumpy was kept at Jersey Zoo by the author Gerald Durrell, and was noted for interacting with the people and animals of the zoo. "Trumpy" is mentioned several times in Durrell's book "Menagerie Manor".

== Status ==
The IUCN follows HBW taxonomy and so assesses the grey-winged and ochre-winged trumpters separately. Both are rated as being of Least Concern. The population size of neither is known but both are believed to be decreasing. The white-winged trumpeter sensu lato is heavily hunted. It is frequently trapped by indigenous peoples but does not reproduce well in captivity. Deforestation for timber, ranching, and gold mining is an ongoing threat.

== Gallery ==
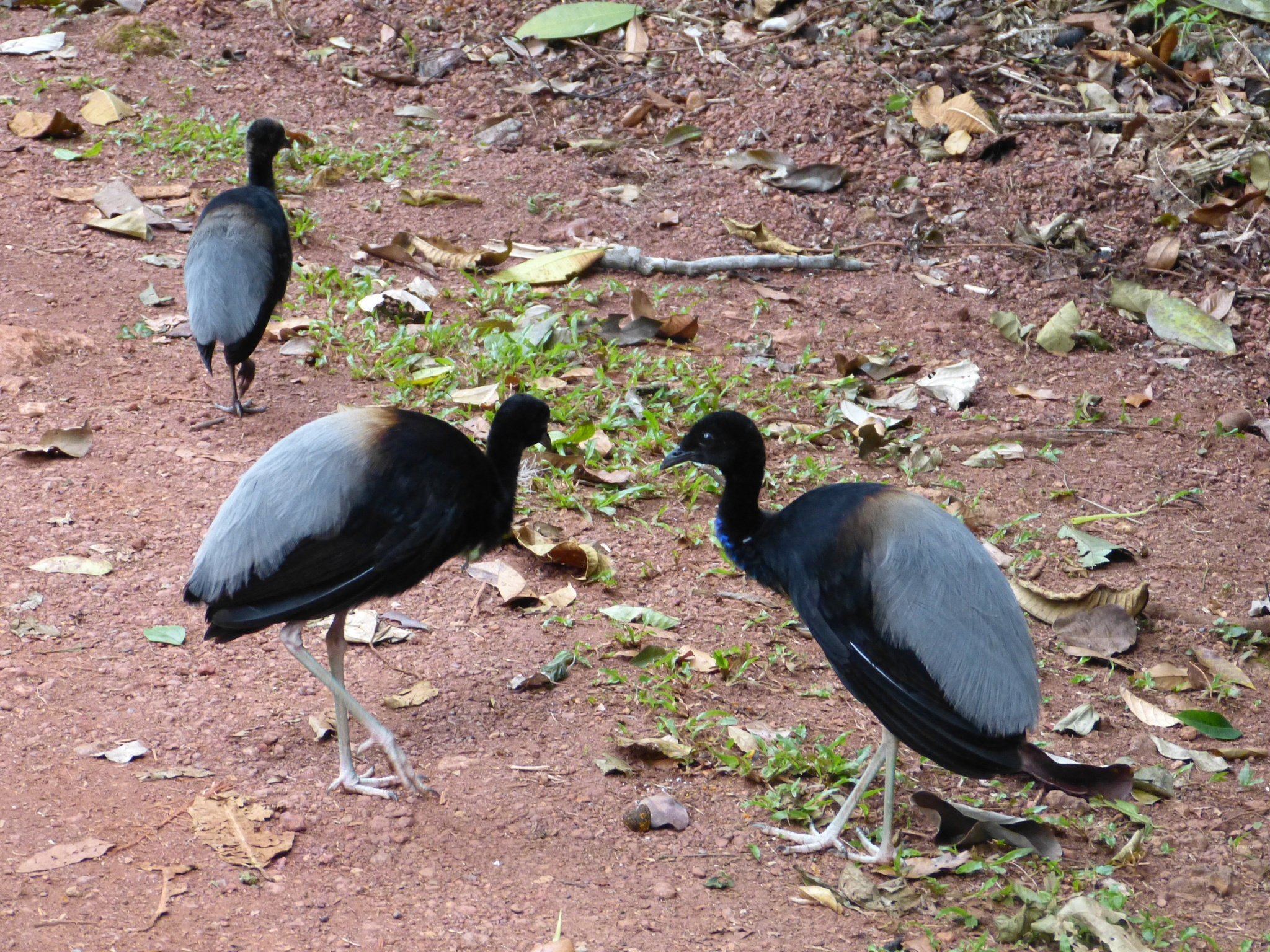
Group in Suriname

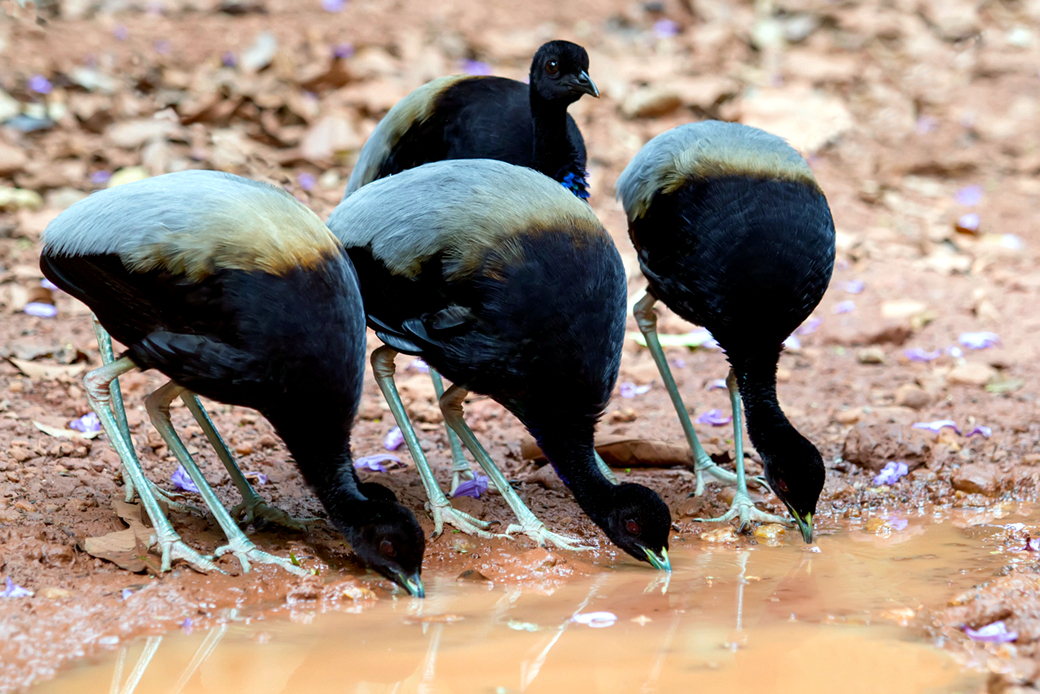
Group in Suriname

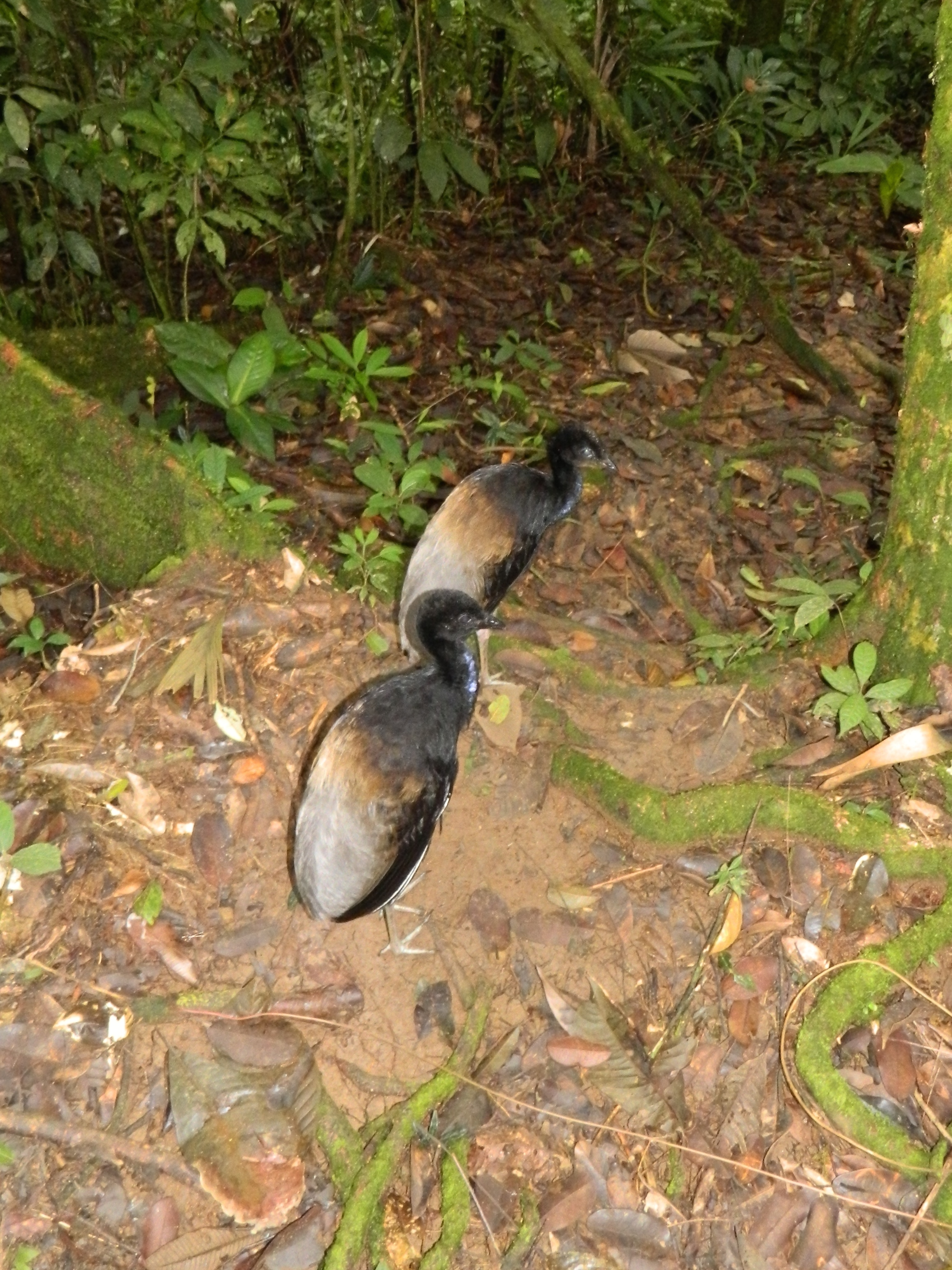
Pair of P. c. napensis in eastern Ecuador

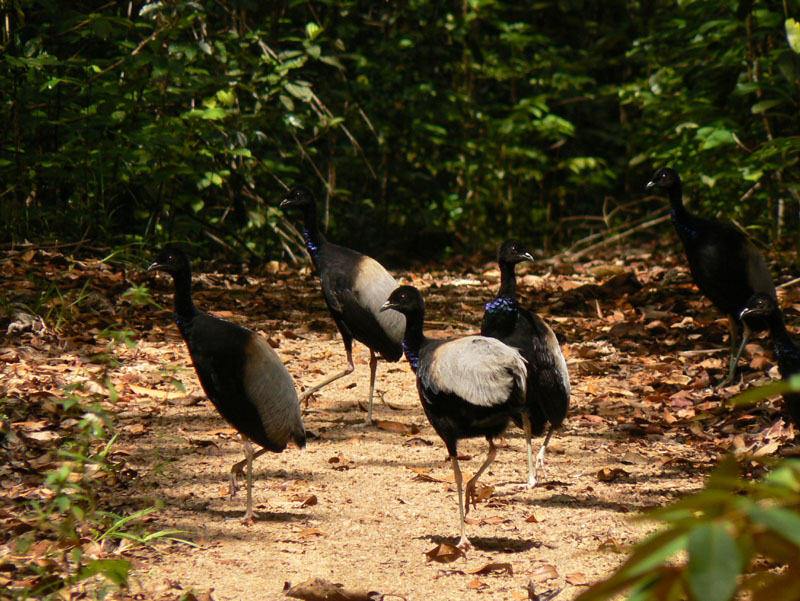
A flock in French Guiana

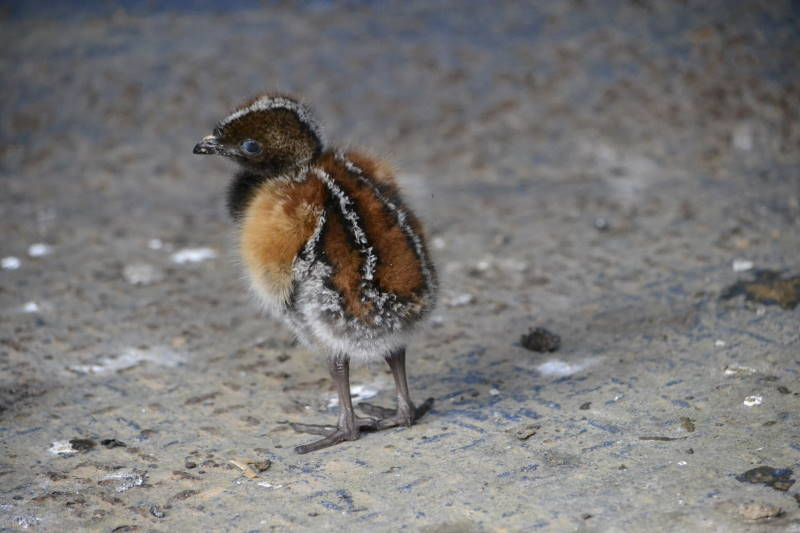
Chick, Ecuador
