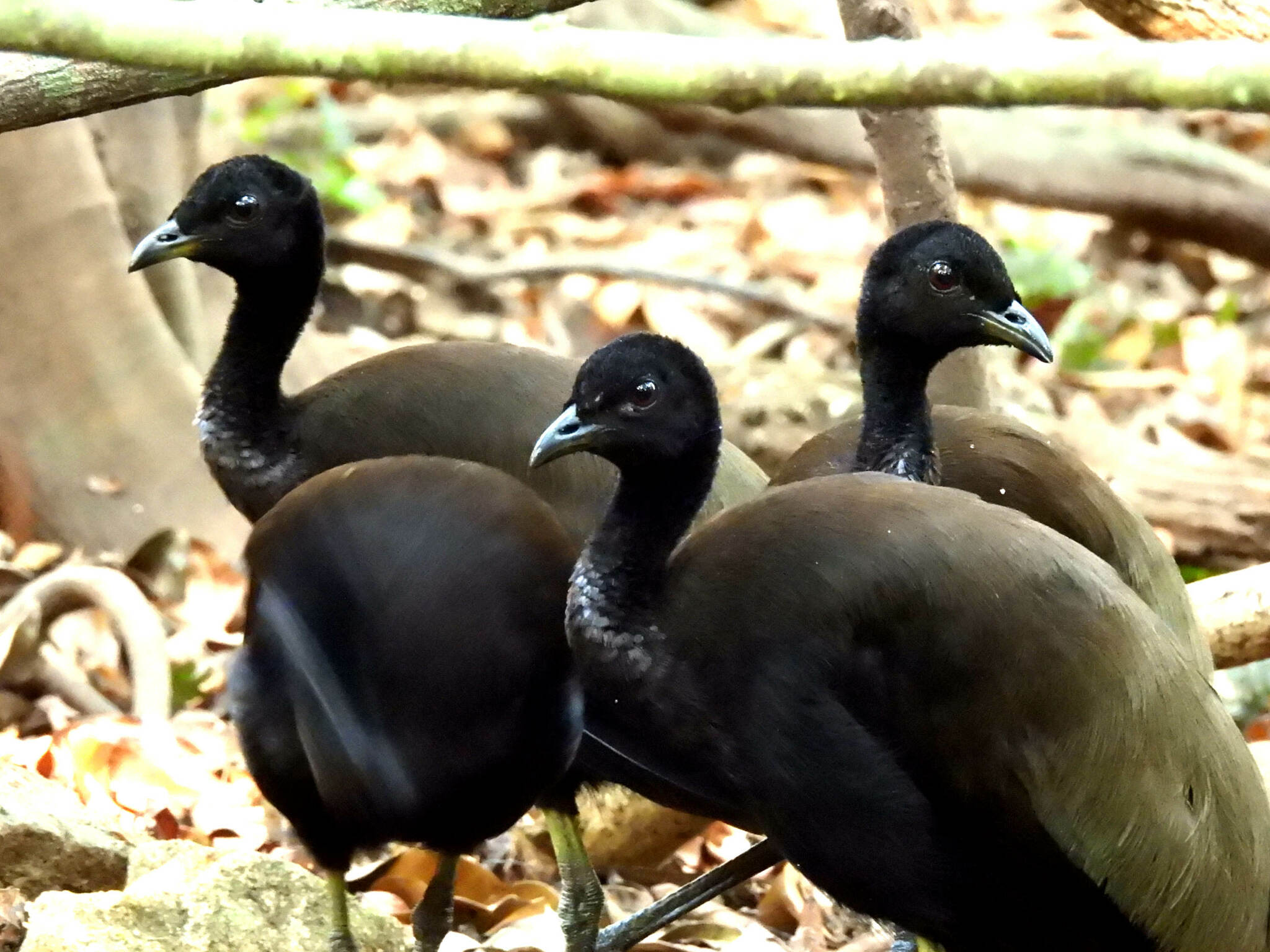

Conservation status
- Endangered (IUCN 3.1)

Scientific classification
- Kingdom: Animalia
- Phylum: Chordata
- Class: Aves
- Order: Gruiformes
- Family: Psophiidae
- Genus: Psophia
- Species: P. dextralis

Binomial name
- Psophia dextralis Conover, 1934

= Olive-winged trumpeter =

Species of bird

The olive-winged trumpeter (Psophia dextralis) is a species of bird in the family Psophiidae. It is found in the Amazon rainforest of Brazil, but only east of the Tapajós River and west of the Araguaia River. This species is listed as Endangered by the IUCN. While the IUCN currently regards Psophia dextralis as a full species, IOC and eBird/Clements taxonomies still regard the olive-winged trumpeter as a subspecies of dark-winged trumpeter (Psophia viridis) as (P. v. dextralis), typically under the common name "dusky-backed trumpeter".

== Behavior ==
The olive-winged trumpeter lives in dense lowland rainforest away from human contact.

=== Diet ===
The olive-winged trumpeter's diet consists of fruit, small vertebrates, arthropods and carrion.

=== Threats ===
The olive-winged trumpeter is threatened by deforestation and hunting.

=== Breeding ===
The olive-winged trumpeter's breeding is not well documented; all that is known is that its eggs are large.
