= Binti Jua =

Western gorilla, Brookfield Zoo, b. 1988

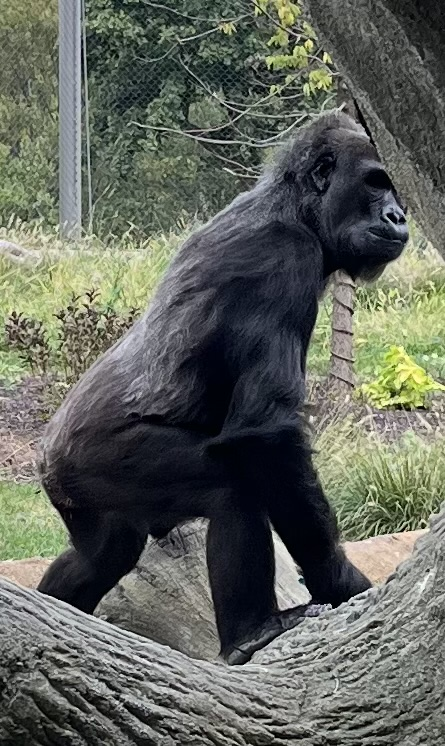
- Species: Western lowland gorilla
- Sex: Female
- Born: March 17, 1988 (age 38); Brookfield Zoo, Brookfield, Illinois, U.S.
- Notable role: Tended to three-year-old boy who had fallen into her enclosure.
- Owners: Brookfield Zoo, Brookfield, Illinois
- Offspring: Koola, Bakari

Binti Jua (born March 17, 1988) is a female western lowland gorilla resident at the Brookfield Zoo, in Brookfield, Illinois, outside Chicago, United States. She received media attention after a situation in 1996 in which she tended to a three-year-old boy who had been injured by falling into her enclosure.

Binti Jua (whose name means "Daughter of Sunshine" in Swahili) is the niece of Koko, a gorilla whose linguistic accomplishments have been the subject of several scientific studies. Her mother, Lulu, was originally from the Bronx Zoo and died on January 24, 2011, after residing at the Columbus Zoo and Aquarium. Her father is Sunshine, from the San Francisco Zoo.

== Family ==
Binti Jua has a daughter named Koola with a wild-born silverback called Abe. She also has a son named Bakari with another wild-born silverback, Ramar, who was purchased by Jack Badal as a baby and was trained to do circus stunts. Ramar inspired a book called Jungle to Stage. Bakari resides at the Saint Louis Zoo with his half-brother, Nadaya. Binti has three granddaughters: Kamba, born to her daughter Koola and silverback Ramar, Nora, born to Koola and silverback JoJo, and Ali, also born to Koola and JoJo. She also has a great-grandson named Zachary through Kamba.

Family tree

Abe	Binti	Ramar
Ramar	Koola	JoJo	Bakari
Kamba	Nora	Ali
Zachary

== Zoo enclosure rescue ==
On August 16, 1996, when Binti Jua was eight years old, a three-year-old boy climbed the wall around the gorilla exhibit and fell 24 feet (7.3 m) into the gorilla enclosure below, suffering a broken hand and a large gash on the side of his face.

Binti walked towards the unconscious boy while spectators screamed. Binti cradled the child and laid him down when she heard her shift door open to her downstairs enclosure. Her 17-month-old baby, Koola, clutched her back throughout the incident. The boy spent four days in the hospital and recovered fully. Binti received international media attention from this incident, and, for many months afterwards, received special treats and food from zoo personnel, and much attention from visitors.

== Aftermath ==
After the incident, experts debated whether Binti's actions were a result of training by the zoo or of animal altruism. Because Binti had been hand-raised by humans, as opposed to being parent-raised (due to her mother rejecting her after Binti was born), she had to be specially trained to care for an infant gorilla and to take her offspring to personnel for examinations. Primatologist Frans de Waal, however, uses Binti Jua as an example of empathy in animals.

There are many other examples of animals (especially primates) demonstrating apparent altruism. In a situation very similar to Binti's, a male gorilla named Jambo, of Jersey Zoo, protected a five-year-old child who had fallen into his enclosure. Jambo was not trained to care for children and was raised in captivity by his own gorilla mother, so his actions may have involved an instinctive sense that the child needed his help. Similar behavior has been seen in chimpanzees who appear to comfort each other after an attack or other trauma.

== See also ==
- Harambe
- Jambo
- List of individual apes
