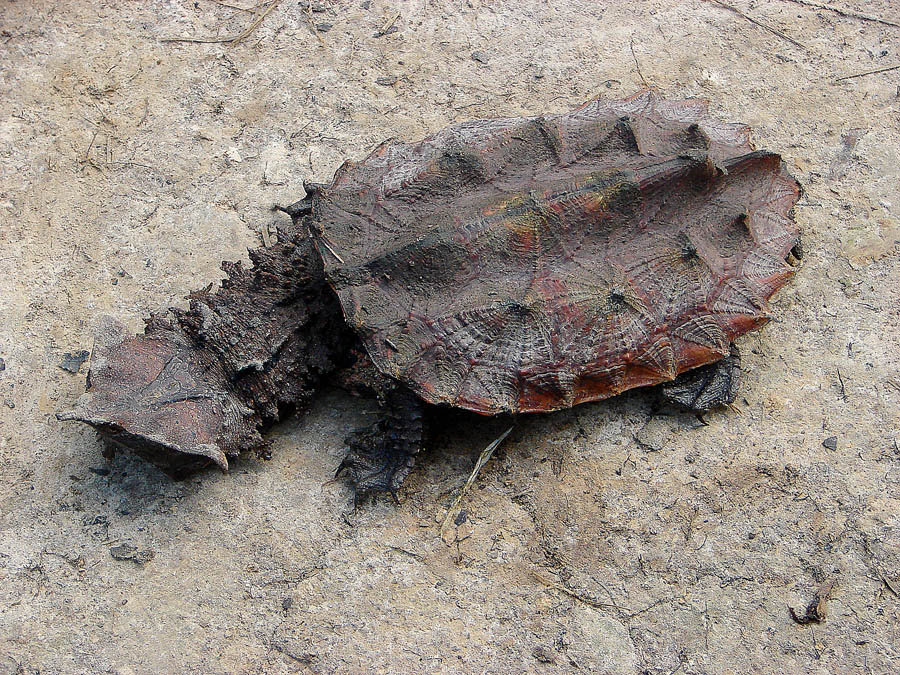
- On the banks of the Javary River

Conservation status
- Least Concern (IUCN 3.1)
- CITES Appendix II

Scientific classification
- Kingdom: Animalia
- Phylum: Chordata
- Class: Reptilia
- Order: Testudines
- Suborder: Pleurodira
- Family: Chelidae
- Genus: Chelus
- Species: C. fimbriata

Binomial name
- Chelus fimbriata (Schneider, 1783)

Synonyms
- Species synonymy: Testudo terrestris Fermin, 1765 Nomen rejectum; Testudo fimbriata Schneider, 1783; Testudo fimbria Gmelin, 1789 nomen novum; Testudo matamata Bruguière, 1792 nomen novum; Testudo bispinosa Daudin, 1801 nomen novum; Emydes matamata Brongniart, 1805; Chelus fimbriata (Schneider, 1783) recombination; Testudo rapara Gray, 1831 nomen novum; Testudo raparara Gray, 1844 nomen novum; Testudo raxarara Gray, 1856 nomen novum; Chelys boulengerii Baur, 1890 nomen novum

= Amazon mata mata =

Amazon mata mata Temporal range: Pliocene–Recent

Species of freshwater turtle

The Amazon mata mata (Chelus fimbriata) is a South American species of freshwater turtle found in the Amazon basin and river system of the eastern Guianas.

== Taxonomy ==
The mata mata first became known to western scientists when it was described by French naturalist Pierre Barrère in 1741 as a "large land turtle with spiky and ridged scales" (translation). Mata matas were first scientifically described as Testudo terrestris in 1765 by Spanish zoologist Fermín Zanón Cervera, but the same scientific name was used for describing the Greek tortoise by Peter Forsskål posthumously in 1775. In 1783, the mata mata was scientifically described again, this time as Testudo fimbriata by German naturalist Johann Gottlob Schneider. In 1805, it was moved to its own genus as Chelys fimbriata by André Marie Constant Duméril. From the mid 1700s to the late 1800s, altogether 15 different scientific names were used for the species. Since the late 1800s, most authorities have used the name Chelys fimbriata. In 1963, the International Commission on Zoological Nomenclature resolved the issue of Testudo terrestris (Fermín 1765) by declaring it a nomen oblitum (meaning that only Testudo terrestris Forsskål 1775 is valid and a synonym for the Greek tortoise), while also declaring that Chelys fimbriata is a conserved name for the mata mata.

In 1995, distinct morphological differences were noted between the populations of the Amazon and Orinoco basins. In 2020, this was supported by a genetic analysis, which showed a deep split between two of its populations. The authors proposed that the mostly Orinoco population be assigned to a new species, Chelus orinocensis, with the Amazon population retaining the C. fimbriatus. C. fimbriatus is absent from the upper Rio Negro–Branco system (the northernmost part of the Amazon basin), which instead is inhabited by C. orinocensis.

== Habitat ==
The Amazon mata mata inhabits slow moving streams, stagnant pools, marshes, and swamps ranging into northern Bolivia, eastern Peru, eastern Ecuador, southeastern Colombia, the eastern Guianas, and northern and central Brazil.

It was formerly believed to also occur in the Orinoco basin, western Guianas and upper Rio Negro–Branco system, but in 2020 these populations were found to belong to a separate species, Chelus orinocensis (Orinoco mata mata).

== Anatomy and morphology ==
The Amazon mata mata is distinguished from the Orinoco species through several characteristics: a carapace with parallel to slightly constricted sides, resulting in a rectangular shape; darkly pigmented plastron; and bold, black bars on the underside of the head and neck. These characters are consistent throughout growth.

== Reproduction ==
Males display for females by extending their limbs, lunging their heads toward the females with mouths agape, and moving the lateral flaps on their heads. Nesting occurs from October through December in the Upper Amazon. The 12 to 28 brittle, spherical, 35 mm-diameter eggs are deposited in a clutch.

== Gallery ==
Juveniles from Peru

Juvenile, in Ecuador

Face closeup, in Brazil
