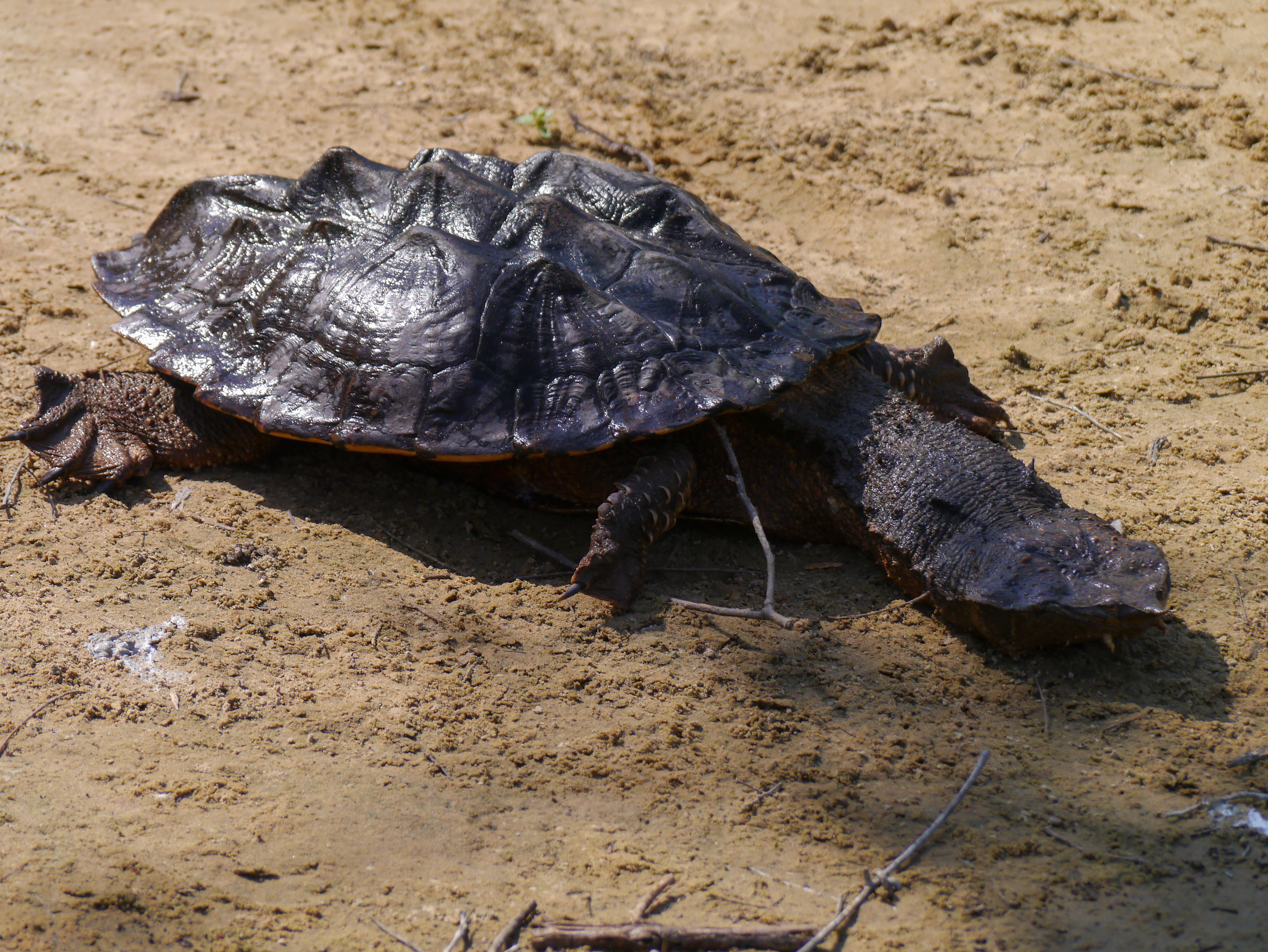
- In Venezuela

Conservation status
- Least Concern (IUCN 3.1)

Scientific classification
- Kingdom: Animalia
- Phylum: Chordata
- Class: Reptilia
- Order: Testudines
- Suborder: Pleurodira
- Family: Chelidae
- Genus: Chelus
- Species: C. orinocensis

Binomial name
- Chelus orinocensis Vargas-Ramírez, et al. 2020

= Chelus orinocensis =

Species of turtle

Chelus orinocensis, the Orinoco mata mata, is a species of freshwater turtle found in northern South America in the Orinoco, upper Rio Negro–Branco and Essequibo basins, and in Trinidad. It was split off from the very similar Chelus fimbriata in 2020.

== Description ==
A genetic analysis of the mata mata was reported in 2020, which showed a deep split between two of its populations. The authors proposed that the mostly Orinoco population be assigned to a new species, Chelus orinocensis, with the Amazon population retaining the Chelus fimbriatus species designation. However, Chelus fimbriatus is absent from the upper Rio Negro–Branco system (the northernmost part of the Amazon basin), which instead is inhabited by Chelus orinocensis.

Prior to its description as a separate species, observations of distinctive morphological differences had already been noted among specimens in the populations of the Amazon and Orinoco basins.

The Orinoco mata mata is distinguished from the Amazon species through several characteristics: an oval-shaped carapace (as opposed to carapace with parallel to slightly constricted sides, resulting in a rectangular shape); lightly pigmented plastron (often being yellowish); and bold, black bars on the underside of the head and neck of juveniles, which fade with age and become largely pinkish in adults. Some populations have reddish plastrons, but this appears to be a form of staining as this coloration may be cleaned off; the staining is thought to be ab effect of water-borne tannins, which is characteristic of black-water rivers.

Carapace

Plastron
