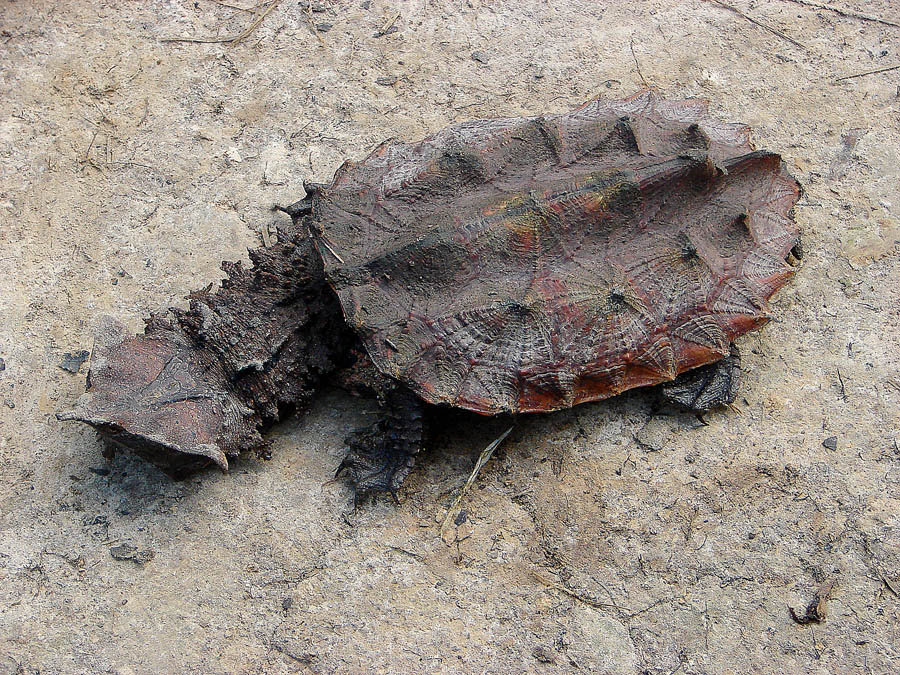
- Chelus fimbriatus
- Chelus orinocensis

Scientific classification
- Kingdom: Animalia
- Phylum: Chordata
- Class: Reptilia
- Order: Testudines
- Suborder: Pleurodira
- Family: Chelidae
- Subfamily: Chelinae
- Genus: Chelus; Duméril, 1805

Type species
- Testudo fimbriata Schneider 1783

= Chelus =

Chelus Temporal range: Miocene–recent

Genus of turtles

Chelus is a genus of large freshwater turtles found in tropical South America, known as matamatas, mata-matas, or mata matas. Formerly considered to be a monotypic genus, it now consists of two extant species after Chelus orinocensis was identified in 2020 from a genetic analysis.

== Evolution ==
Fossils of the extinct †C. colombianus have been found in Venezuela, Colombia, and Brazil, including a skull dating to the early Miocene (~ 16 m.y.) of the Castilletes Formation, Cocinetas Basin, in Colombia. The fossil shows that the skull morphology of Chelus has been almost unchanged since the Miocene.

The two extant species diverged during the late Miocene approximately 12.7 million years ago, likely as a result of the tectonic forces that divided the Orinoco basin and Amazon basin around 10.5 million years ago.

Skull (lateral view)

Skull (dorsal view)

Skull (ventral view)

== Species ==
There are two extant recognized species in this genus and one extinct species:

- Chelus fimbriatus – Amazon mata mata
- Chelus orinocensis – Orinoco mata mata
- †Chelus colombianus – Columbian mata mata (Early-Late Miocene)

== Description ==
Mata matas are large, sedentary turtles with large, triangular, flattened head with many tubercles and flaps of skin, and a "spike" on their long and tubular snouts. Three barbels occur on the chin and four additional filamentous barbels at the upper jaw, which is neither hooked nor notched.

The mata mata's brown or black, oblong carapace can measure up to 45 cm (18 in) at adult age. The mata mata's plastron is reduced, narrowed, hingeless, shortened towards the front, and deeply notched at the rear with narrow bridges. The shell may be meant to resemble a piece of bark, camouflaging it from possible predators. The neck is longer than the vertebra under its carapace and is fringed with small skin flaps along both sides. Hatchlings show a pink to reddish tinge in the underside edge of their carapaces and plastrons that gradually disappear as they grow. Each forefoot has five webbed claws. Males have concave plastrons and longer, thicker tails than females.

== Behavior ==
The shell of mata matas shell resemble bark, and their heads resemble fallen leaves. As they remain motionless in the water, the skin flaps enable them to blend into the surrounding vegetation until a fish comes close. Mata mata thrust out their heads and open their large mouths as wide as possible, creating a low-pressure vacuum that sucks the prey into their mouth, known as suction feeding. Mata matas snap their mouth shut, the water is slowly expelled, and fish are swallowed whole.

Mata matas are strictly aquatic, but prefer standing in shallow water where their snouts can reach the surface to breathe.

== Diet ==
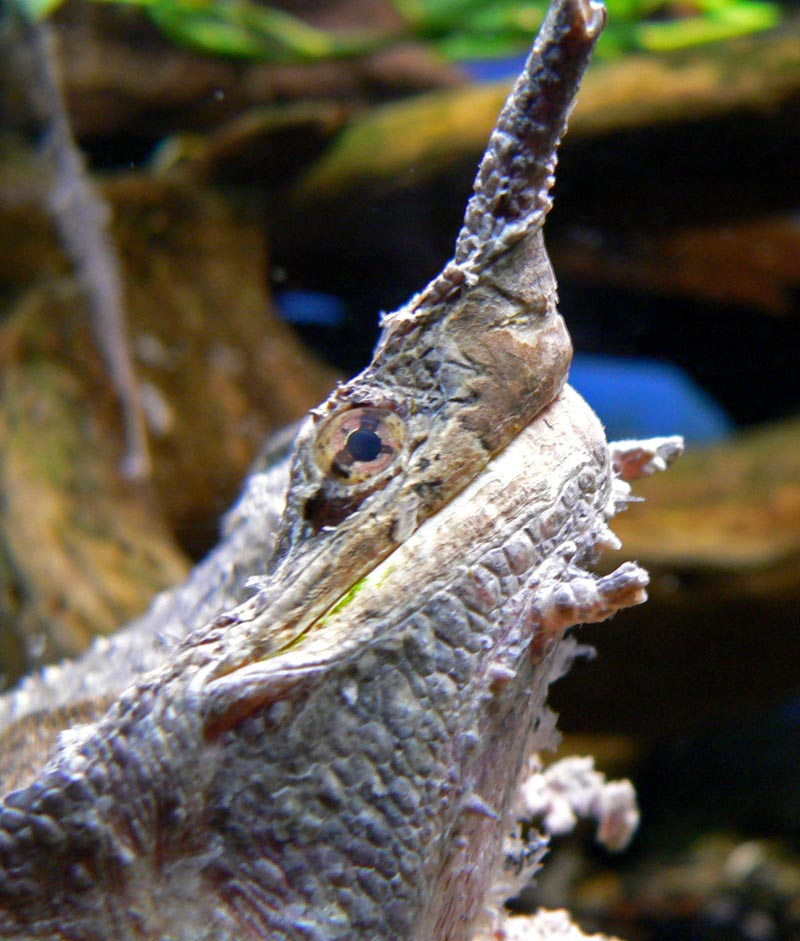
Closeup of a mata mata's head

Mata matas are carnivorous, feeding almost exclusively upon aquatic invertebrates (such as worms, mussels, crustaceans and insects) and fish. On rare occasions, they may feed on small birds, amphibians or small mammals that have entered the water. When the stomach contents of 20 wild mata matas were examined it consisted exclusively of small fish. The turtles predominantly feed at night in muddy water with limited visibility. However the turtle is well adapted to hunting in these conditions. Mata matas have very fine eyesight with eyes that reflect light, similar to other nocturnal reptiles. In addition, the skin flaps on the neck are also extremely sensitive and help mata matas detect nearby movement.

Mata matas use a specific method of seizing their prey. They will move the prey into shallower areas of water, surround the prey, and wave their front legs to prevent them from escaping. Once surrounded, mata matas will open their mouths and contract their pharynx, causing a rush of water that pushes the prey into their mouth.

== In captivity ==
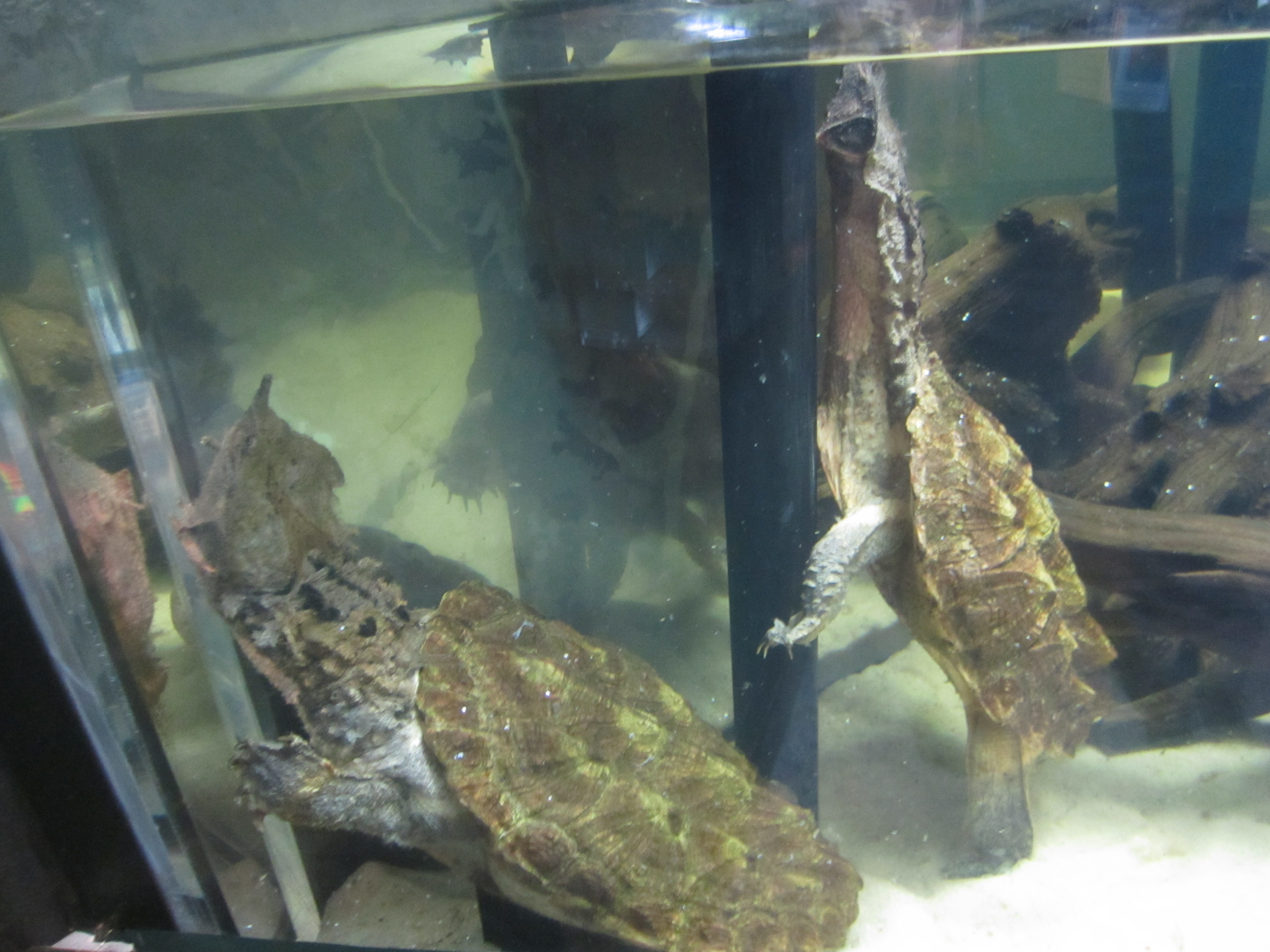
On exhibit at the North Carolina Museum of Natural Sciences

Mata matas are readily available in the exotic pet trade and are quite expensive to obtain. Due to their unique appearance, they make interesting display animals. They also grow quite large. However, mata matas are not active hunters, so, like the alligator snapping turtle, they need less space than a large, active species.

As with all aquatic turtles, water quality is one of the keys to keeping this species successfully in captivity. Warm, acidic water is the best type used with a high tannin content that should be maintained all year round. Moderate to heavy filtration is recommended. Author David Fogel considers his captive mata mata turtles to be quite intelligent. For example, he has observed one turtle positioning itself near the spray bar of the aquarium at feeding time so that floating food is pushed beneath the water's surface where the turtle can catch it more easily.
