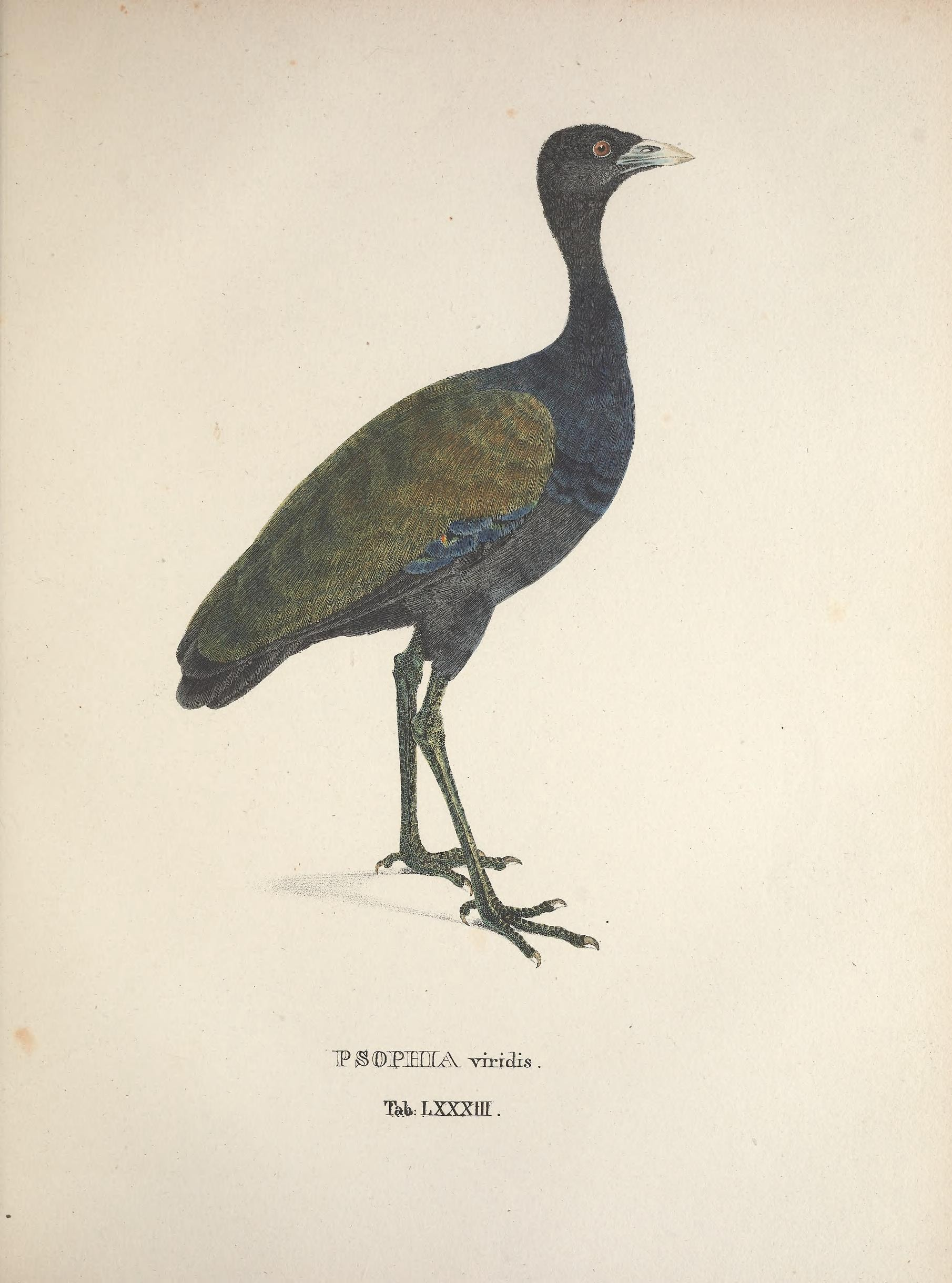

Conservation status
- Vulnerable (IUCN 3.1)

Scientific classification
- Kingdom: Animalia
- Phylum: Chordata
- Class: Aves
- Order: Gruiformes
- Family: Psophiidae
- Genus: Psophia
- Species: P. viridis

Binomial name
- Psophia viridis Spix, 1825

= Dark-winged trumpeter =

Species of bird

The dark-winged trumpeter or green-winged trumpeter (Psophia viridis) is a species of bird in the family Psophiidae. It is endemic to Brazil.

== Taxonomy and systematics ==
The dark-winged trumpeter's taxonomy is far from settled. The International Ornithological Committee (IOC) assigns it three subspecies, the nominate P. v. viridis, P. v. dextralis, and P. v. obscura. The Clements taxonomy splits a fourth from dextralis, P. v. interjecta. BirdLife International's Handbook of the Birds of the World (HBW) treats each of the three IOC-recognized subspecies as separate species, the "green-winged", "olive-winged", and "black-winged" trumpeters respectively. HBW includes interjecta as a subspecies of the "olive-winged". Considerable evidence supports the treatment as three species.

This article follows the IOC three-subspecies model.

Dark-winged trumpeters at Cristalino Jungle Lodge, Brazil

== Description ==
The dark-winged trumpeter is a chicken-like bird with a long neck and legs and a hump-backed profile. It is 45 to 52 centimetres (18 to 20 in) long. The sexes are alike. Their bill color ranges from dusky brown to bright green and their legs and feet are dusky brown to greenish olive. Adults of the nominate subspecies are mostly velvety blackish with a dark smoky olive-green mantle and wing patch. They have an iridescent purple patch on the lower neck and their outer wing coverts are tipped with iridescent purple. Subspecies P. v. dextralis (including interjecta) has a dark brown mantle and wing patch that is olive green towards the end. It has no iridescence on the neck or wing coverts. P. v. obscura is almost identical to dextralis but has a small amount of purple iridescence on the lower neck and wing coverts.

== Distribution and habitat ==
The dark-winged trumpeter is found in the Amazon Basin of Brazil south of the Amazon River. The nominate subspecies is the westernmost, found between the Rio Madeira and the Rio Tapajós. Subspecies P. v. dextralis is found from the Tapajós to the Rio Tocantins. (P. v. dextralis sensu stricto and P. v. interjecta are separated by the Rio Xingu when they are treated as individual subspecies.) P. v. obscura is found from the Tocantins to the Atlantic coast in the state of Pará. Undocumented sight records in northeastern Bolivia lead the South American Classification Committee of the American Ornithological Society to call the species hypothetical in that country.

== Behavior ==
=== Movement ===
The dark-winged trumpeter is assumed to be sedentary and territorial like the other trumpeters.

=== Feeding ===
The dark-winged trumpeter forages in groups containing up to about 20 individuals. Its diet is not known in detail but includes fruit, arthropods, small vertebrates, and carrion. It sometimes follows army ant swarms to capture fleeing prey.

=== Breeding ===
Almost nothing is known about the dark-winged trumpeter's breeding biology. Its breeding season appears to include January to April. The other trumpeters are polyandrous and cooperative breeders. They nest in tree holes made by other bird species.

=== Vocalization ===
All trumpeters are highly vocal. The dark-winged trumpeter's song has been described as "a series of low humming notes, given singly at first and then doubled." It also makes "various harsh, sharp or raucous 'tset' notes" as both contact and alarm calls.

== Status ==
The IUCN follows HBW taxonomy and so has assessed the "green-winged", "olive-winged", and "black-winged" trumpeters separately. The "green-winged" (viridis) is Vulnerable. The "olive-winged" (dextralis) is Endangered. The population sizes of these two are unknown and believed to be decreasing due to deforestation and hunting. The "black-winged" (obscura) is Critically Endangered. It has a small range and its estimated population of 50 to 250 mature individuals is believed to be decreasing, like that of the others due to deforestation and hunting.
