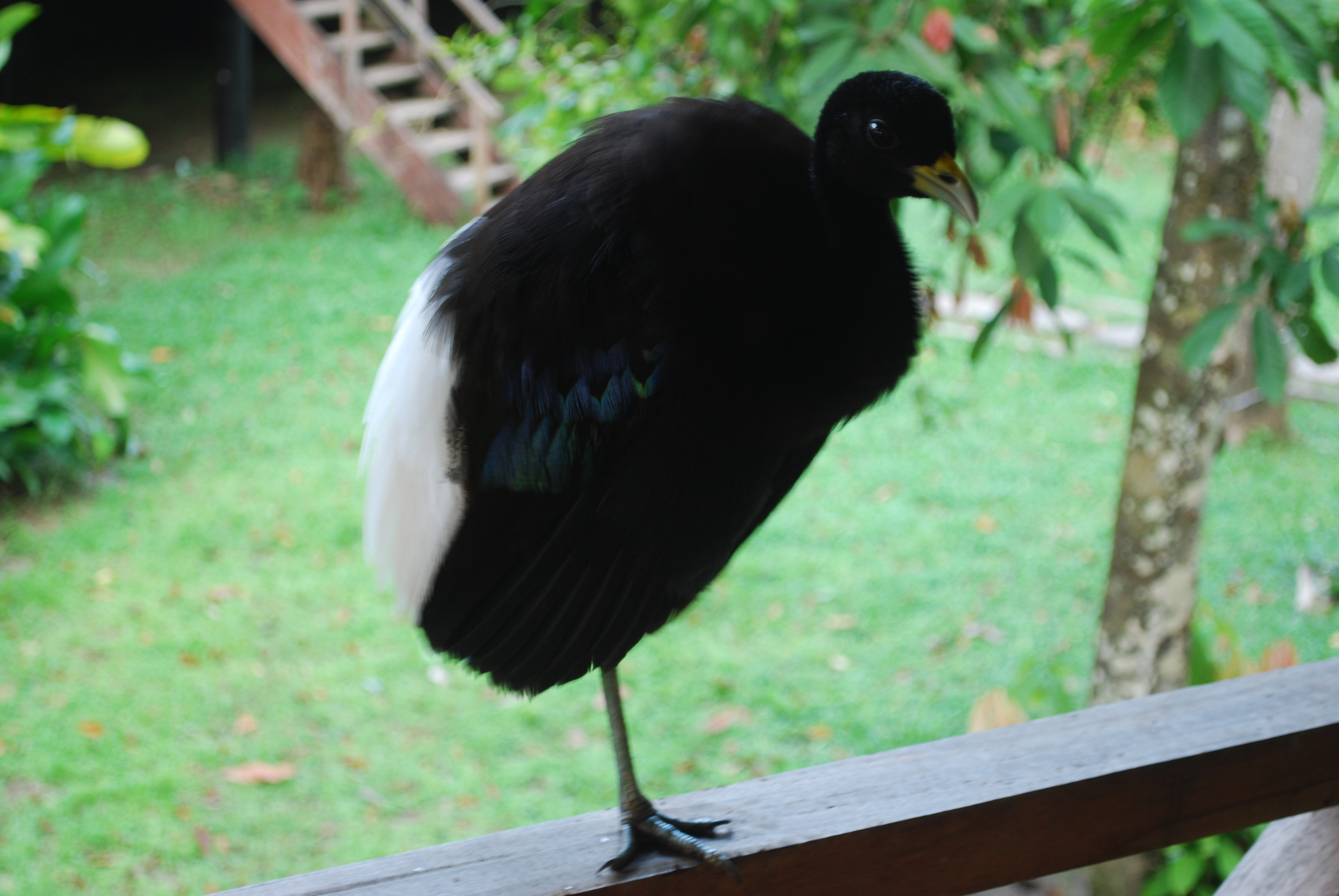
- near Puerto Maldonado, Peru

Conservation status
- Least Concern (IUCN 3.1)

Scientific classification
- Kingdom: Animalia
- Phylum: Chordata
- Class: Aves
- Order: Gruiformes
- Family: Psophiidae
- Genus: Psophia
- Species: P. leucoptera

Binomial name
- Psophia leucoptera Spix, 1825

= Pale-winged trumpeter =

Species of bird

The pale-winged trumpeter (Psophia leucoptera), also known as the white-winged trumpeter, is a species of bird in the family Psophiidae. It is found in the western Amazon rainforest of Bolivia, Brazil, and Peru.

== Taxonomy and systematics ==
The "ochre-winged" trumpeter is now considered a subspecies of the grey-winged trumpeter (P. crepitans).

== Description ==
The pale-winged trumpeter is a chicken-like bird with a long neck and legs and a hump-backed profile. It is 45 to 52 centimetres (18 to 20 in) long. Males weigh 1.28 to 1.44 kg (2.8 to 3.2 lb) and females 1.18 to 1.32 kg (2.6 to 2.9 lb). The sexes are similar in appearance. Their stout, slightly decurved, bill is grayish with a yellow base and their legs and feet are pale grayish. They are almost entirely black, with a white hindwing and purple, green, and bronze iridescence on the outer wing coverts.

== Distribution and habitat ==
The pale-winged trumpeter is found in the upper Amazon Basin of eastern Peru, northern and central Bolivia, and central-western Brazil south of the Amazon and west of the Rio Madeira. A single record in extreme southeastern Colombia has not been accepted by the South American Classification Committee of the American Ornithological Society. The species inhabits dense lowland tropical rainforest. Within that broad category it favors landscapes away from human habitations. In elevation it ranges up to 750 m (2,500 ft).

== Behavior ==
=== Movement ===
The pale-winged trumpeter is entirely non-migratory and tends to move only within the flock's territory.

=== Feeding ===
The pale-winged trumpeter is primarily frugivorous. It forages on the forest floor for fallen ripe fruit which makes up 90% of its diet. The remainder of its diet is invertebrates like beetles and ants and occasionally small vertebrates like snakes.

=== Breeding ===
The reproductive behavior of the pale-winged trumpeter is the best known of all the trumpeters'. They are polyandrous and cooperative breeders, and groups of adults defend a territory together. Groups have a dominant pair who are the only pair to lay a clutch. While subordinate males do mate with the dominant female, this occurs when the dominant female is not fertile. When the dominant female is fertile, the dominant male will aggressively prevent other males from mating with her. Their breeding season begins at the end of the dry season and continues throughout the rainy season, typically between September and April. The female will lay her clutch in a shallow tree cavity that is an average of 11 meters off the ground and free of vines or other vegetation to avoid the risk of nest predation. The clutch size is two to four eggs but usually three. The incubation period is 23 to 29 days with the dominant male and female taking turns to incubate, and subordinate males also contribute to incubation. The young hatch covered with thick, dark, cryptically patterned down. The day after hatching, chicks jump down to the ground and follow the adults.

=== Cleaning symbiosis ===
Pale-winged trumpeters have cleaning symbiosis, a form of mutualism, with ungulate species like the gray brocket deer as they are ectoparasite removers. Trumpeter groups will occasionally follow ungulates around pecking to remove ticks, and also have been observed snatching other pests like flies that are swarming the ungulate. This cleaning symbiosis provides nutritional benefit for pale-winged trumpeters as well as reduces the risk of ectoparasite disease vectors for the ungulate.

=== Vocalization ===
All trumpeters are highly vocal. The pale-winged trumpeter's song is a low pitched "wuh-wuh-wuh wuh wuh - -". Its alarm call is "loud, harsh 'KRETCH' notes".

== Status ==
The IUCN originally assessed the pale-winged trumpeter as being of Least Concern, but listed is as Near Threatened between 2014–2023. As of 2023, it is again listed as Least Concern. Habitat degradation associated with cattle ranching and agriculture along with hunting are the most serious threats facing this species.
