= Jambo =

Gorilla known for protecting a child that had fallen in his enclosure

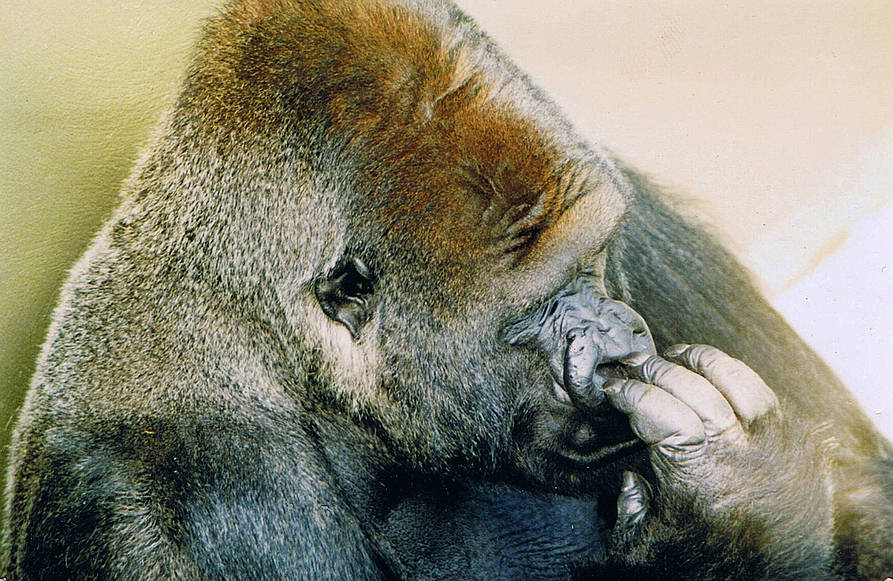
- Jambo c. 1986
- Species: Western gorilla
- Sex: Male
- Born: 17 April 1961; Zoo Basel, Basel, Switzerland
- Died: 16 September 1992 (aged 31); Jersey Zoo
- Known for: Protecting a child that had fallen in his enclosure

Jambo (17 April 1961 – 16 September 1992) was a gorilla housed at Durrell Wildlife Park in Jersey, Channel Islands. He was involved in an incident in which he was seen to be protective of a child who fell into his enclosure.

== Early life ==
Jambo means "hello" in Swahili. The gorilla was born on 17 April 1961, in Zoo Basel, Basel, Switzerland, to mother Achilla and father Stephi. Stephi was acquired from the Columbus Zoo in Ohio. Stephi was captured in 1950 by Columbus resident and gorilla hunter Bill Said, with two other baby gorillas, in French Equatorial Africa. The three were sold to the Columbus Zoo for $10,000. The two which the Columbus Zoo kept, Baron Macombo and Millie Christina, became the parents of Colo, the first gorilla born in a zoo, in Columbus on 22 December 1956. She was the first gorilla born in captivity as well as the first gorilla in captivity to be raised by her own mother.

Jambo's older sister Goma, born on 23 September 1959 in Basel, was the first gorilla born in Europe and lived in the Zoo Basel until her death in 2018. Before Jambo was transferred to Jersey Zoo, Jambo and Goma had a son named Tamtam, who was born at Zoo Basel on 2 May 1971, and died at Wuppertal Zoo on 23 July 2009. Jambo also fathered a daughter while still at Zoo Basel by an unrelated female. Jambo had seven siblings and 20 offspring by five different mates, including three stillbirths. He was moved to Jersey Zoo on 27 April 1972.

== Rescue of Levan Merritt ==
On 31 August 1986, five-year-old Levan Merritt fell into the gorilla enclosure and lost consciousness. Jambo stood guard over the boy when he was unconscious, placing himself between the boy and other gorillas in what ethologists analyze as a protective gesture. He later stroked the unconscious boy's back. When the boy regained consciousness and started to cry, Jambo and the other gorillas retreated in panic, and the silverback led them into a small hut in the corner of their pen. A paramedic and two keepers rescued the boy. Most of the incident was recorded on home video and extensively photographed by zoo visitors. The publicity on major news channels and newspapers helped ease public fears about the potentially violent nature of gorillas.

== Death and legacy ==
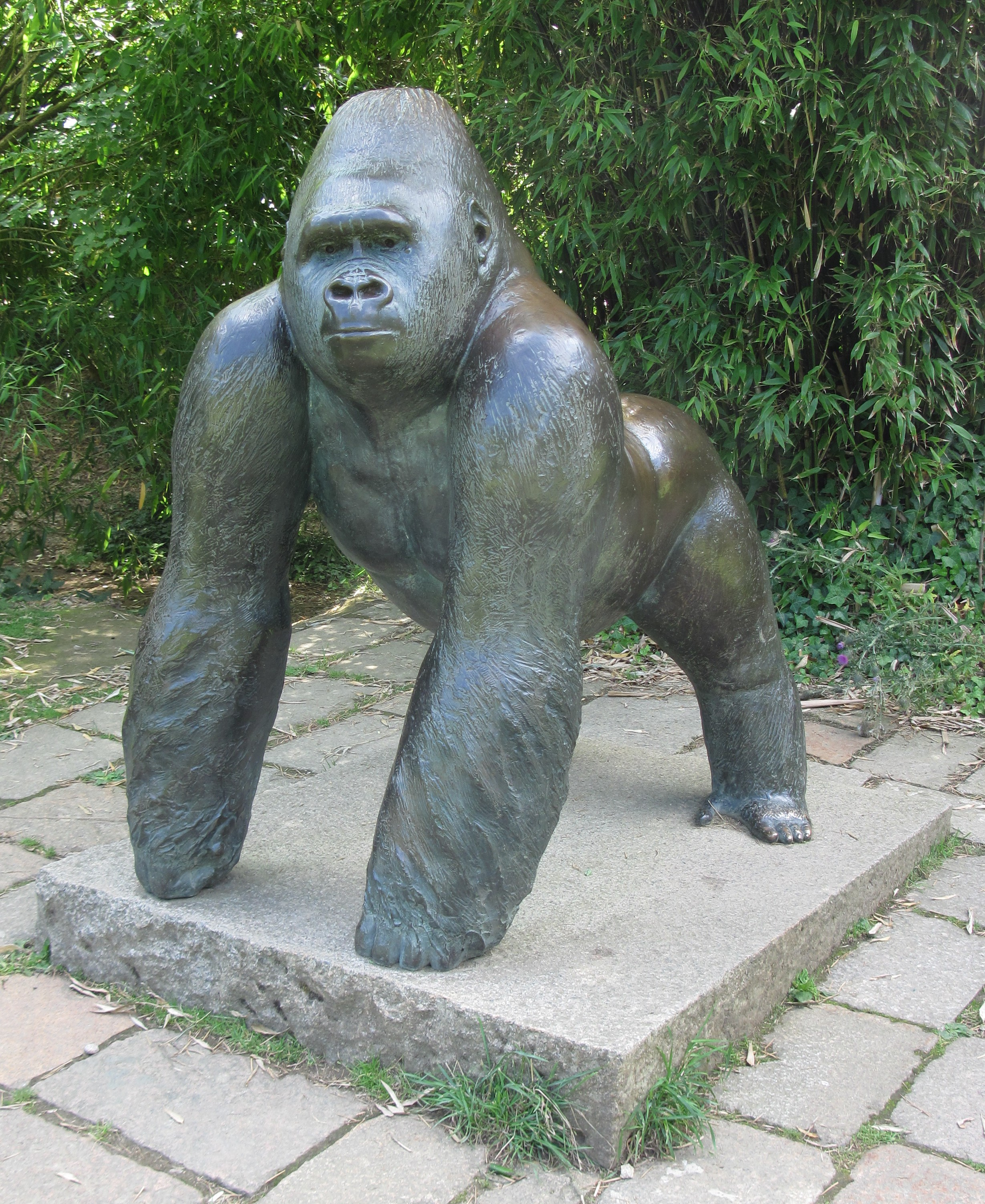
Statue of Jambo by Ralph Brown at Durrell Wildlife Park

Jambo was found dead by his keeper in the gorilla enclosure on 16 September 1992. The cause of death was the spontaneous rupture of a major artery, resulting in a hemorrhage in his chest. A biography of Jambo, written and illustrated by his keeper, was published following his death. A documentary has also been released primarily based on the home video footage of the Levan Merritt incident.

Jersey Zoo has erected a bronze statue of Jambo inside the zoo grounds as a tribute to the gorilla who helped change public perception about the species.

== See also ==
- Binti Jua, a gorilla at Brookfield Zoo in Brookfield, Illinois, who protected a three-year-old boy who had fallen into her enclosure in a similar incident in 1996.
- Harambe
- List of individual apes
