= Menagerie Manor =

1964 book by Gerald Durrell

First edition (publ. Rupert Hart-Davis)

Menagerie Manor is a book by Gerald Durrell, published in 1964. The book is a collection of pen portraits of some of the creatures of Gerald Durrell's Zoo - and some of the lessons Durrell learned about making real and sustaining his childhood ambition of having his own zoo. It officially opened on March 26, 1959. The Manor of the title is Les Augrès Manor in Trinity, Jersey.
