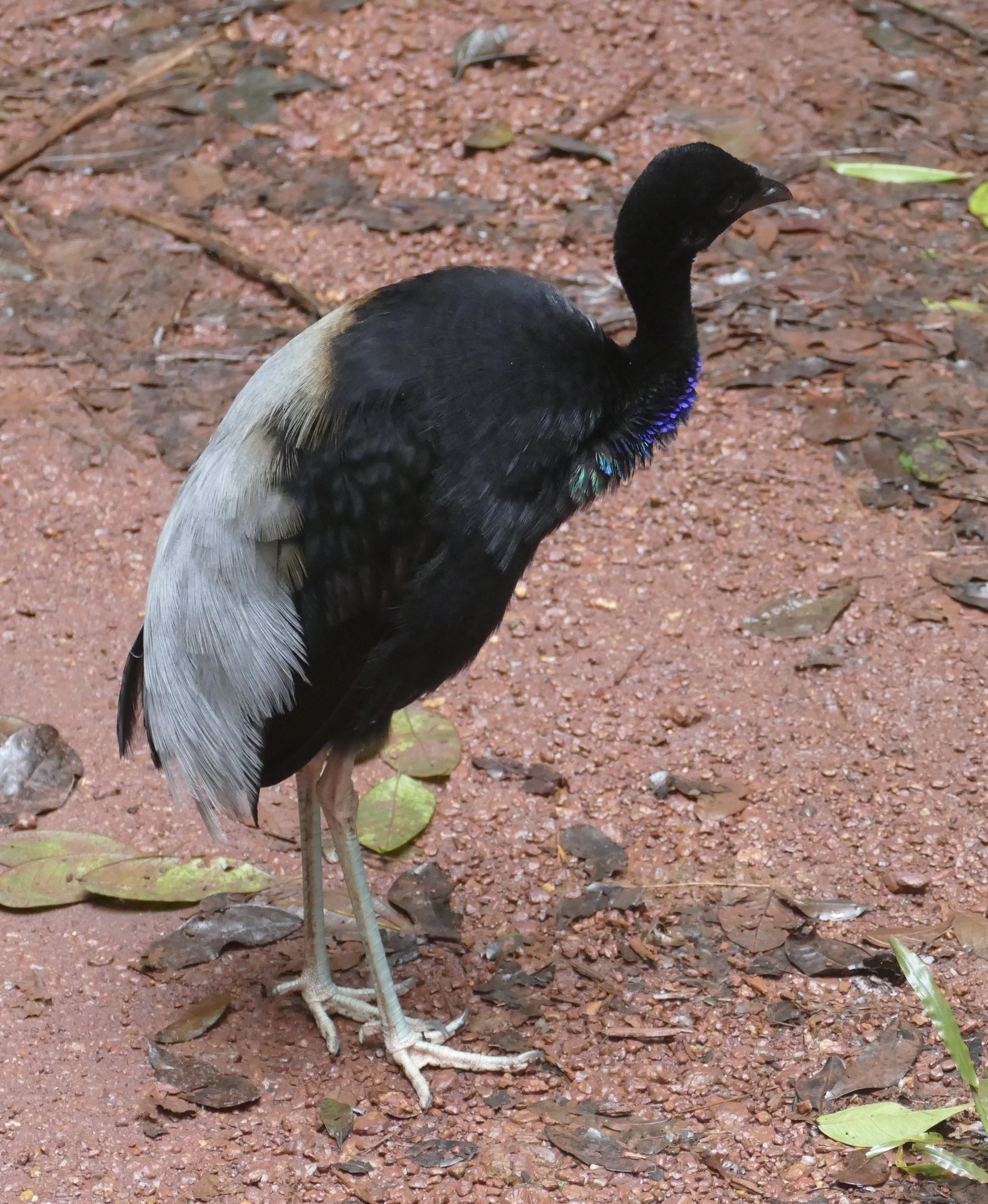
- Grey-winged trumpeter (Psophia crepitans) in Suriname

Scientific classification
- Kingdom: Animalia
- Phylum: Chordata
- Class: Aves
- Order: Gruiformes
- Family: Psophiidae; Bonaparte, 1831
- Genus: Psophia; Linnaeus, 1758

Type species
- Psophia crepitans (grey-winged trumpeter) Linnaeus, 1758

Species
- 3–8, see text
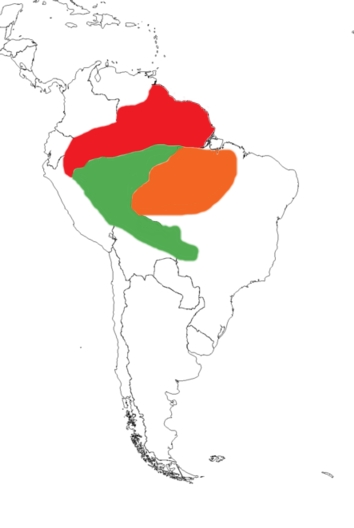
- Approximate distribution of grey-winged (red), pale-winged (green) and dark-winged trumpeter (orange). The ranges are separated by large rivers.

= Psophia =

Trumpeters

Family of birds from northern South America

Psophia is a genus of birds restricted to the humid forests of the Amazon and Guiana Shield in South America. It is the only genus in the family Psophiidae. Birds in the genus are commonly known as trumpeters, due to the trumpeting or cackling threat call of the males. The three species resemble slightly taller, longer-legged chickens in size and appearance; they measure 45 to 52 centimetres (18 to 20 inches) long and weigh 1 to 1.5 kg (2.2 to 3.3 lb). They are rotund birds with long, flexible necks and legs, downward-curving bills and a "hunched" appearance. Their heads are small, but their eyes are relatively large, making them look inquisitive and "good-natured". The plumage is soft, resembling fur or velvet on the head and neck. It is mostly black, with purple, green, or bronze iridescence, particularly on the wing coverts and the lower neck. In the best-known taxa, the secondary and tertial flight feathers are white, grey, or greenish-black and hairlike, falling over the lower back, which is the same colour. These colours give the three generally accepted species their names.

== Taxonomy and systematics ==
The genus Psophia was introduced in 1758 by the Swedish naturalist Carl Linnaeus, in the tenth edition of his Systema Naturae, as containing a single species, the grey-winged trumpeter (Psophia crepitans). The genus name is from the Ancient Greek psophos meaning "noise".

The genus' taxonomy is far from settled; anywhere from three to six species (with varying numbers of subspecies) are accepted by different taxonomic systems.

The International Ornithological Committee's treatment is the most conservative. They accept three species, two of which have three subspecies:

- Grey-winged trumpeter, Psophia crepitans
  - P. c. crepitans
  - P. c. napensis
  - P. c. ochroptera
- Pale-winged trumpeter, Psophia leucoptera
- Dark-winged trumpeter, Psophia viridis
  - P. v. viridis
  - P. v. dextralis
  - P. v. obscura

The Clements taxonomy splits P. v. dextralis and adds English names to the subspecies:

- Grey-winged trumpeter, Psophia crepitans
  - P. c. crepitans (grey-winged)
  - P. c. napensis (Napo)
  - P. c. ochroptera (ochre-winged)
- Pale-winged trumpeter, Psophia leucoptera
- Dark-winged trumpeter, Psophia viridis
  - P. v. viridis (green-backed)
  - P. v. dextralis (dusky-backed)
  - P. v. interjecta (Xingu)
  - P. v. obscura (black-backed)

BirdLife International's Handbook of the Birds of the World (HBW) accepts six species:

- Grey-winged trumpeter, Psophia crepitans
  - P. c. crepitans
  - P. c. napensis
- Ochre-winged trumpeter, Psophia ochroptera
- White-winged trumpeter, Psophia leucoptera
- Green-winged trumpeter, Psophia viridis
- Olive-winged trumpeter, Psophia dextralis
  - P. d. dextralis
  - P. d. interjecta
- Black-winged trumpeter, Psophia obscura

Traditionally, only three species of trumpeters have been recognised. A 2008 review of the morphology of the dark-winged trumpeter resulted in the recommendation that it be divided into three species. A 2010 review of the phylogeny and biogeography of all members of the family resulted in a suggested total of eight species, with two in the grey-winged trumpeter complex, two in the pale-winged trumpeter complex, and four in the dark-winged trumpeter complex.

== Behaviour and ecology ==
Trumpeters fly weakly but run fast; they can easily outrun dogs. They are also capable of swimming across small rivers; large rivers are however a major barrier to them, with the distribution boundaries of the species being defined by major rivers, including the Amazon, and its tributaries the Madeira, the Tapajós, and the Tocantins. They spend most of the day in noisy flocks, sometimes numbering more than 100, on the forest floor. They feed on fallen fruit (particularly fruit knocked down by monkeys). They also eat a small amount of arthropods, including ants and flies, and even some reptiles and amphibians. At night they fly with difficulty into trees to roost 6 to 9 metres (20 to 30 ft) above the ground.

Trumpeters nest in a hole in a tree or in the crown of a palm tree. They lay 2 to 5 eggs with rough, white shells, averaging about 76 grams (2.7 ounces). In the pale-winged trumpeter and the grey-winged trumpeter, groups of adults care for a single clutch.

== Relationship with humans ==
Trumpeters are often used as "guard dogs" because they call loudly when alarmed, become tame easily, and are believed to be adept at killing snakes. One source states their skill at hunting snakes as a fact, and the nineteenth-century botanist Richard Spruce gave an account of the friendliness and snake-killing prowess of a tame grey-winged trumpeter. For these reasons, Spruce recommended that England import trumpeters to India. However, another source says this prowess is "reputed".
