= Jersey Zoo =

Zoo on the island of Jersey

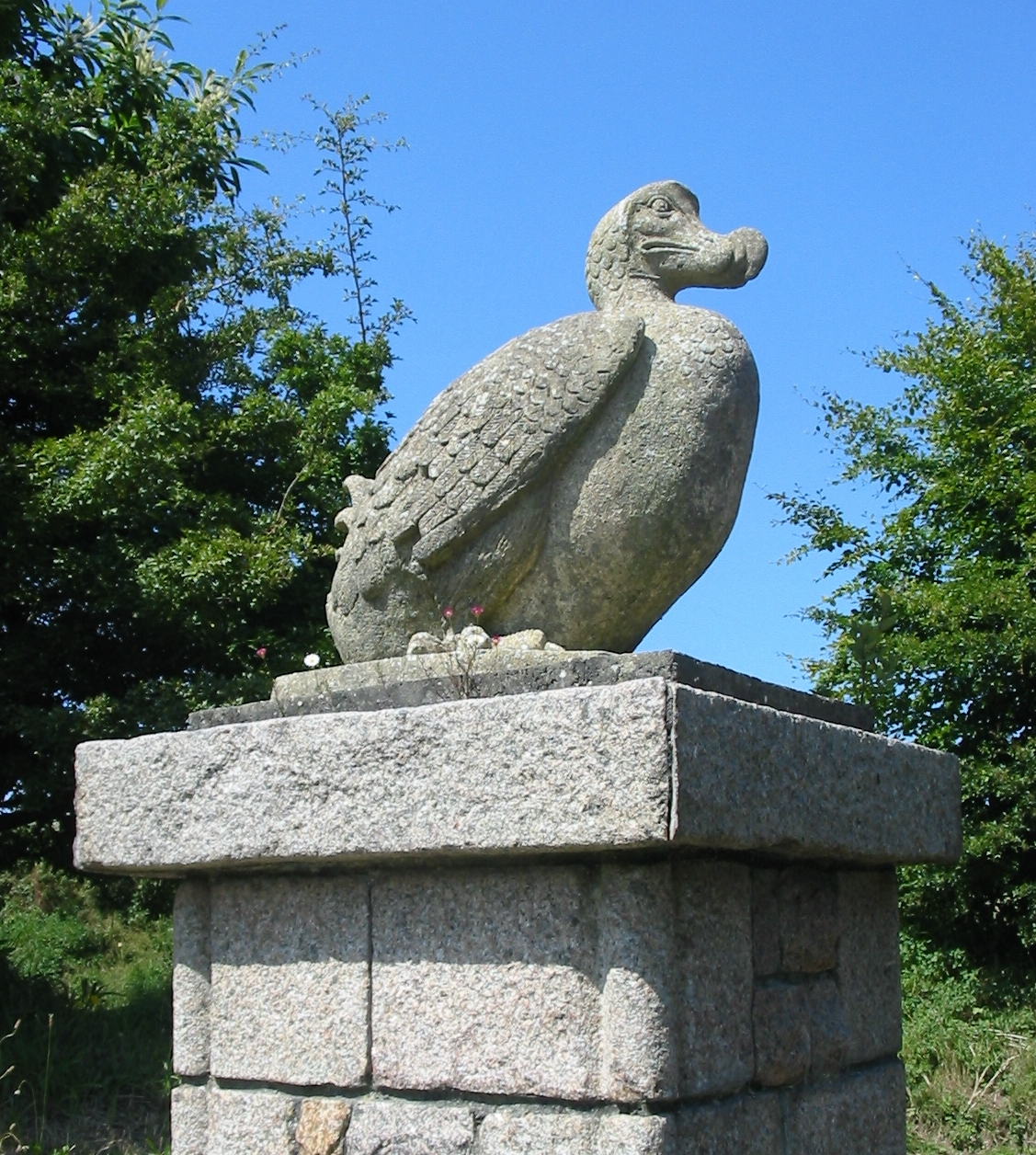
- The dodo is the symbol of the trust and the zoo. Statues of dodos stand at the zoo's gateways.
- Interactive map of Jersey Zoo
- 49°13′45″N 02°04′25″W
- Date opened: 26 March 1959
- Location: Trinity, Jersey
- Land area: 32 acres (13 ha)
- No. of animals: 1,400+
- No. of species: 130+
- Annual visitors: 169,000 (2009)

Jersey Zoo (formerly Durrell Wildlife Park) is a zoological park established in 1959 on the island of Jersey in the English Channel by naturalist and writer Gerald Durrell. It is operated by the Durrell Wildlife Conservation Trust. In 2023, the zoo welcomed 209,474 visitors, its highest number in four years.

Jersey Zoo has always concentrated on rare and endangered species. It houses mammals, birds, amphibians and reptiles, comprising over 130 species. In 2025, Niall Husbands was appointed Chair of the Trust, succeeding Matthew Hatchwell.

== Overview ==
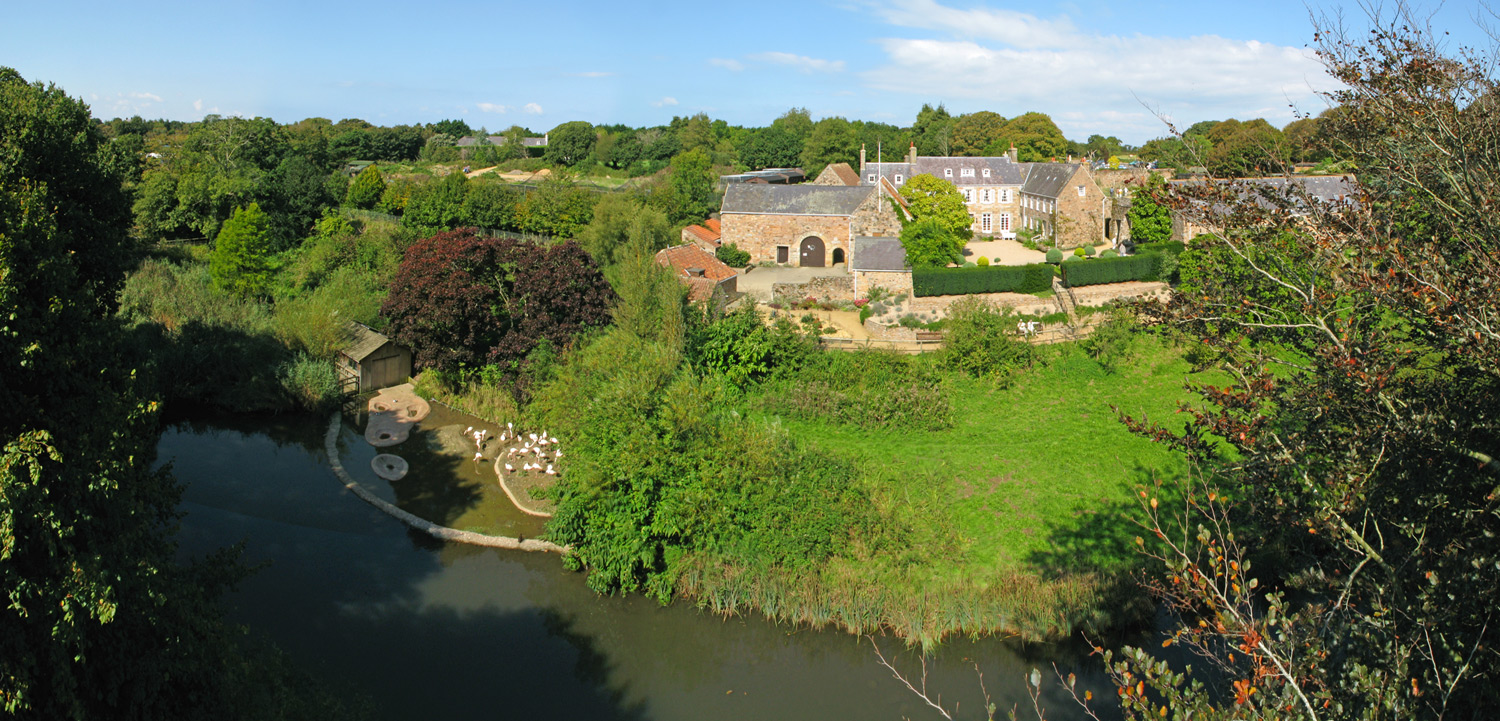
Buildings at the zoo (photo September 2008)

The park is located at Les Augrès Manor, Trinity, Jersey, 5 miles (8 km) north of Saint Helier. It officially opened on 26 March 1959.

The park is situated in 32 acres (13 ha) of landscaped parkland and water-gardens. The Trust has a commitment to looking after the Island's native wildlife, and large areas within the grounds have been designated native habitat areas. The planting of flowering and fruiting trees throughout the grounds also serves to attract wild birds and insects. Included in the former are several species of bird which used to be commonly seen in island gardens but have become increasingly scarce, including the house sparrow and song thrush.

There are over 50 nest-boxes positioned around the grounds, which are used by a variety of birds including barn owls, kestrels, swallows and house martins. Other animals which are commonly seen within the grounds are the red squirrel, bank vole, and the short-toed treecreeper.

== History ==
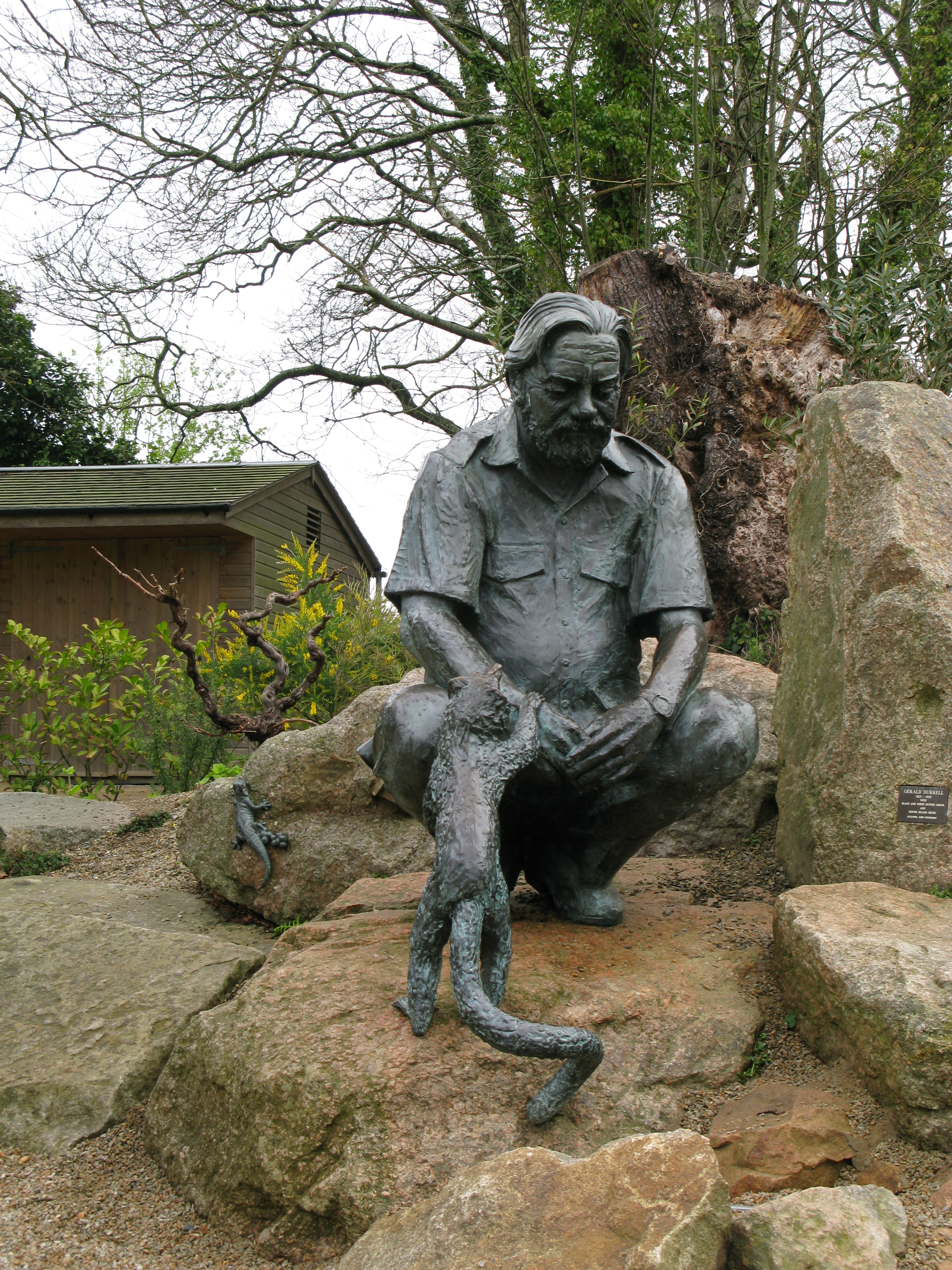
Statue of Gerald Durrell with a black-and-white ruffed lemur, April 2008

Gerald Durrell began his career capturing animals for other zoos, but thought that the facilities needed to concentrate more on animal conservation rather than mere entertainment. He started the zoo in 1959. Durrell tells the story of starting the zoo in his book Menagerie Manor and others.

In January 2008 plans known as "New Vision" were unveiled for the future of the zoo. These plans had an emphasis on the notion of "TopSpots"; places where the greatest diversity of animals are found such as islands and highlands. The plan included projects including African Bai, an environment mirroring the ecology of the African habitat that the western lowland gorillas would need to adapt to if one day it would be safe for them to be left alone in the wild; Mascarenia, to the mammals, birds and terrapins of Madagascar, Mauritius and islands of the western Indian Ocean; and eco-lodge cabins for visitors to stay in.

It was budgeted that the cost of the redevelopment would be in the region of £46 million (equivalent to £68,000,000 in 2024) over the next five years. All funds needed to be raised through public and private donations. But most of the plan was eventually cancelled due to costs.

In May 2011, a new visitor centre and restaurant was officially opened by Princess Anne. A webcam service has been recently developed at the zoo. Cameras have been installed in the meerkat enclosure, as well as in those of the Telfair's skinks, the Livingstone's fruit bats and in the Kirindy Forest, the home of a rare and colourful bird collection. The webcam lets viewers to those species at times when they are often inaccessible, including watching the fruit bats during the evening when they are most active. In 2015 an infant silverback gorilla named Indigo who lived at the park was chosen to be the mascot of the 2015 Island Games which were held on the island.

== Exhibits ==
=== Jewels of the Forest ===
Opened in 2004, this exhibit houses various Asian birds such as:

- Palawan peacock-pheasant
- Blue-crowned laughingthrush
- Red-tailed laughingthrush
- White-rumped shama
- Nicobar pigeon
- Emerald dove
- Mindanao bleeding-heart dove
- Java sparrow
- Pekin robin
- Chestnut-backed thrush
- Asian fairy-bluebird
- Grey-faced liocichla

=== Cloud Forest ===
Opened in 1999, the Cloud Forest was the first enclosure at the zoo to feature mixed animals, including carnivorous species.

- Andean bear
- Visayan warty pig – temporary residents whilst new home is built (completed in 2023)
- Black howler monkey
- Linnaeus's two-toed sloth
- Bush Dog

=== Princess Royal Pavilion ===
The Pavilion was opened by Princess Anne in the 1970s, and serves as a conference centre, and classroom. The theatre shows films depicting the work of the trust, and also exhibits artwork. It highlights the work undertaken by the Trust around the world.

=== The Gaherty Reptile and Amphibian Centre ===
The reptile house is the home of many species of reptiles and amphibians. The Gaherty Reptile and Amphibian Centre was so named because of a gift from Canadian philanthropist Geoff Gaherty. Around sixty percent of the species are not on public display. Those that are include:

Reptiles

- Ploughshare tortoise
- Madagascan big-headed turtle
- Lesser Antillean iguana
- Cuban Iguana
- Serrated casquehead iguana
- Rio Fuerte beaded lizard
- Telfair's skink
- Turqoise Dwarf Gecko
- Lesser night gecko
- Martinique's anole
- Emerald tree boa
- Dumeril's boa
- Galapagos giant tortoise - external paddock (seasonal)
- Radiated tortoise - external paddock (seasonal)
- European adder - outdoor enclosure (seasonal)

Amphibians

- Mountain chicken
- Strawberry poison-dart frog
- Blue poison dart frog
- Golden poison dart frog
- Mission golden-eyed tree frog
- Amazon poison dart frog

=== Discovery Desert ===
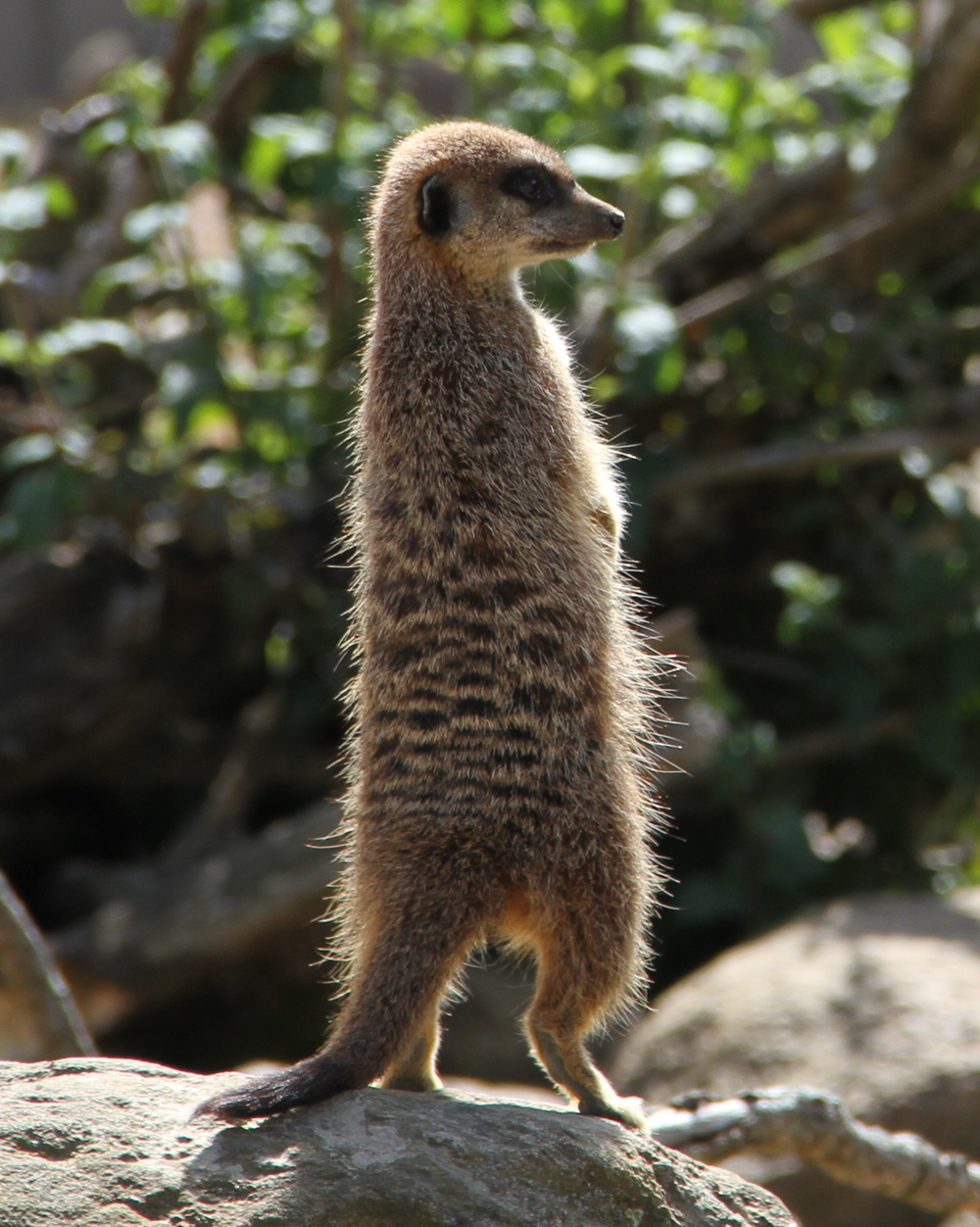
One of the meerkats in 2012

The Discovery Desert was opened in April 2009, and was designed to give the family of meerkats more room to roam, and prevent them from digging for freedom. Discovery Desert is a mixed-species exhibit featuring other animals which share the meerkat's habitat in the wild.

=== Gorillas ===
The western lowland gorilla family has been represented at Jersey Zoo since it first opened in 1959, when they had only an infant female (thought to be male at first) gorilla named N'Pongo, who was later joined by a younger infant female gorilla named Nandi. The current enclosure includes an outdoor play area, and three internal rooms, two large on-show ones and a smaller off-show one. The family of five is led by a silverback called Badongo, who was born in La Vallée des Singes, a zoo in France. Badongo is the successor of Ya Kwanza, and has had two offspring with Bahasha, a male named Indigo and a female named Amari. Indigo has since left to start his own family. The remaining members of the troupe are Kishka (who died in 2024), and Hlalli Kahilli a female descendant of Jambo and N'Pongo. Female Afia joined them in June 2026 from Bristol zoo.

An expanded and updated gorilla complex was completed in 2026.

Jambo

Jambo was a gorilla who was born in 1961, in the Zoo Basel, Switzerland. Jambo featured in the news on 31 August 1986, when five-year-old Levan Merritt fell into the gorilla enclosure and lost consciousness. Jambo stood guard over the boy when he was unconscious, placing himself between the boy and other gorillas in what ethnologists analyse as a protective gesture. He later stroked the unconscious boy. When the boy regained consciousness and started to cry, Jambo and the other gorillas retreated, and an ambulance paramedic and two keepers rescued the boy.

=== Orangutans and gibbons ===
In an enclosure which was revamped in the 1990s the orangutans have a large outdoor play area for them to swing around. The enclosure consists of one large main house, with two extensive external islands surrounded by a moat. The orangutan family have been at Jersey Zoo since 1968, and come from Sumatra. The zoo used to have the Bornean orangutans, until it was decided that it should focus on the rarest when the redevelopment took place. There are currently five orangutans at Jersey Zoo; The dominant male is called Dagu. The adult females are, Annette and Dana. The two offspring are Mawar (who moved to Prague Zoo with her son Gempa in 2011)'s eldest son Jiwa and Annette's son Jantho. Sharing the island play areas is a female lar gibbon named Hazel and a white cheeked gibbon named Genta.

=== Tamarins and marmosets ===
The tamarins are kept in two areas of the park, some such as the golden lion and emperor tamarins best kept within their own enclosures. Meanwhile, others such as the pied tamarin and the silvery marmoset are allowed to run free in a small wooded area.

=== Central Valley ===
The Central Valley expands across the centre of the park, creating a natural barrier and water resource for local species. £1 million project to redevelop the central valley, completed in 2002, has created an area for kingfishers, bank voles, butterflies, dragonflies, and several species of waterfowl. During the valley restoration two species of locally rare orchid were encouraged, and first flowered in 2005. They are Anacamptis laxiflora and Dactylorhiza praetermissa.

Since 1964 Jersey Zoo have been working with the macaque family, in the same location, just to the side of the valley. The family have bred well, though events in Sulawesi counterbalance the work by the zoo's team.

In 2022 the zoo introduced a troupe of 15 gelada to the park. They moved in next door to the Macaque family.

=== Aviaries ===
Dotted around the Central Valley are a number of aviaries which house a selection of birds from different parts of the world. The aviaries are specialised to reflect habitat the birds should become adapted to should they be released back into the wild. They are large enough for them to fly short distances, or search the ground for food.

- Northern bald ibis
- Edward's pheasant
- Bali starling
- Pink pigeon
- Malagasy Black bulbul
- Montserrat oriole
- Wrinkled hornbill
- White-crowned robin-chat
- Javan green magpie
- Sumatran laughingthrush
- Black-winged stilt
- White-winged duck
- White-backed duck
- African pygmy goose
- Madagascar turtle dove

=== Lemur Lake and Pontoon ===
- Ring-tailed lemur
- Red ruffed lemur
- Alaotran gentle lemur

=== Island Bat Roost ===
A large polytunnel was built with used tyres in spring 2011 to home two species of bat, the Rodrigues flying fox and the Livingstone's fruit bat. An additional tunnel was completed in summer 2017, also built using recycled materials, to provide more room for the bats to fly, in particular creating a circular flying pattern.

After at least 10 of the Livingstone's fruit bat colony died from the bacterial infection pasteurella in 2025, the curator of mammals announced that the facility would close, citing the high cost of rebuilding the bat tunnel.

=== Butterfly Kaleidoscope ===
In 2019, a butterfly walkthrough tunnel was built and opened by Princess Anne. It contains Menelaus blue morpho butterflies and some giant tortoises.

=== Tortoise Tunnel ===
Opened in 2023, this is a new temperature-controlled home for four Aldabra giant tortoises.

=== Kirindy Forest ===
A major renovation project was to transform the Walled Gardens into an area marked Kirindy Forest. Based on the dry forests of Madagascar, the area is designed to showcase the work being done with the native species. There are homes for lemurs, giant jumping rats, mongooses and a walkthrough aviary.

- Black-and-white ruffed lemur
- Red-fronted brown lemur
- Aye-aye
- Narrow-striped mongoose
- Malagasy giant rat

Kirindy Walkthrough Aviary

- Hammerkop
- Meller's duck
- Madagascar crested ibis
- Red fody
- Namaqua dove

=== Conservation successes ===
In 1976 there were only four Mauritius kestrel individuals in the wild with one female. Durrell took the risk of taking a recent clutch of eggs and had them hatched successfully – rebuilding the species, almost from scratch. The conservation for the species has moved on to the next stage and its focus has returned to Mauritius, re-establishing the species in the community and ecosystem.

Originally extinct from the wild, the zoo was part of the coalition of zoos which together brought the Przewalski's horse species from the brink of extinction.

== Work in Jersey ==
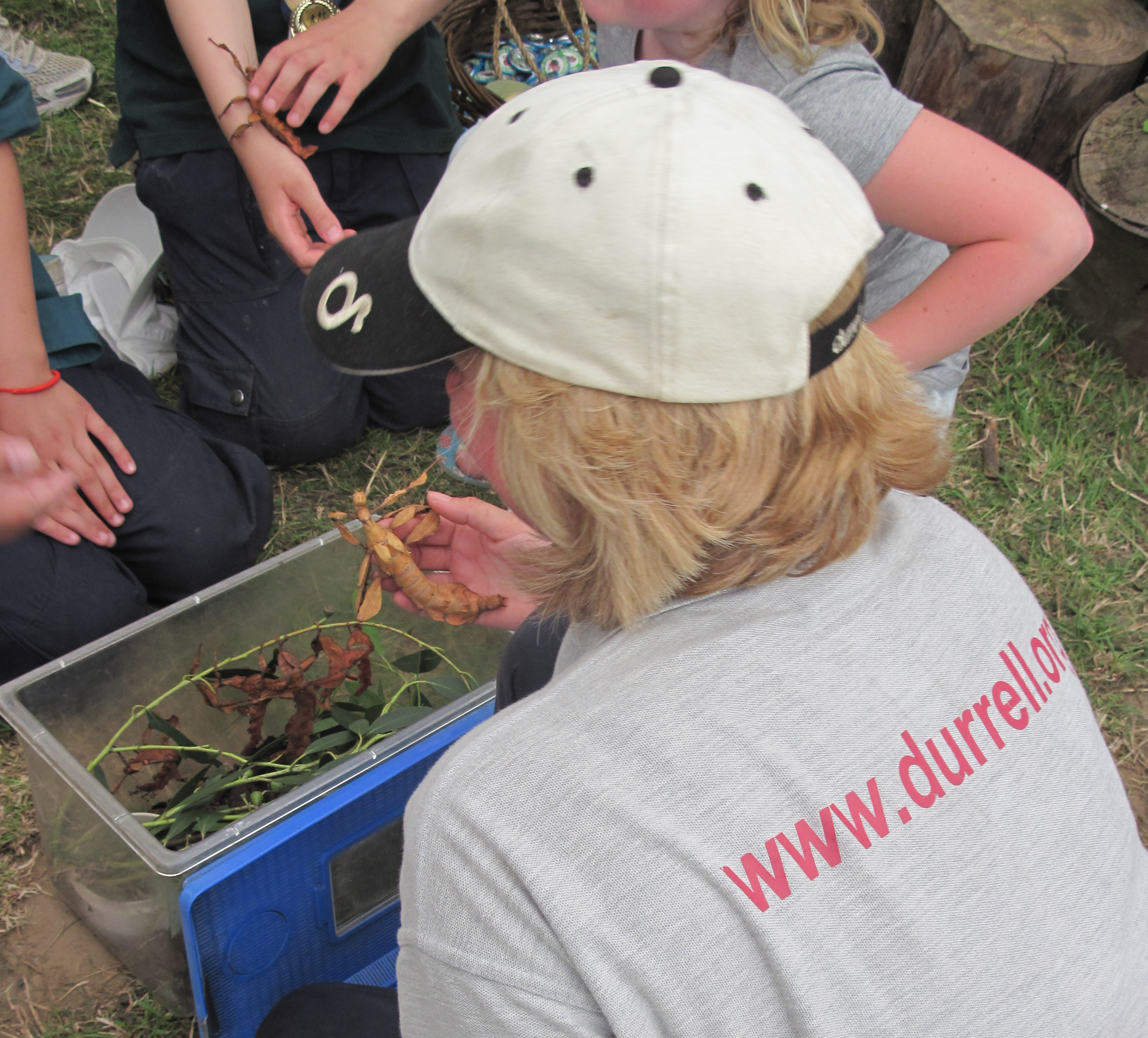
Outreach education in the community at the 2010 West Show

Jersey Zoo works with local wildlife groups to help with the declining populations of Jersey's sand lizard, the Jersey crapaud / common toad, and Jersey's agile frog. It also undertakes efforts to maintain the genetic diversity of locally rare plants. Currently four species are being grown in the propagation unit. Fragaria vesca (wild strawberry), Dianthus gallicus (Jersey pink), Anogramma leptophylla (Jersey fern) and Linaria vulgaris (common toadflax).Other plant species will be propagated as seed or cutting material becomes available. As some of these plant species are severely threatened, finding specimens for propagation will be a challenge.

In 2010, Jersey Zoo undertook a project to reintroduce birds that once populated the island's clifftops, but have long disappeared. The red-billed chough is the first focus of the programme. There are also plans to do something similar with the yellowhammer should the project prove successful. The red-billed chough became extinct on Jersey in the nineteenth century, but they have once again returned. Jersey Zoo has joined a breeding programme and so a group are being kept there to form a captive colony, with hope to establish a free flying colony on Jersey's north coast.

== Operations overseas ==
Although no longer located in Jersey, conservation of Pygmy hogs is still monitored by Jersey Zoo in Assam, India and other locations. During 2008 some pygmy hogs were released into the wild in Assam, early reports show good progress with the species.

There has been some success in Grand Cayman with the blue iguana. Working alongside local authorities the iguana is being saved from extinction. It shows what can be done. In 2008 the project suffered a drawback when intruders broke into the complex and killed numerous iguanas, including juveniles and expecting females.

The Madagascar pochard was previously thought extinct, though was rediscovered when looking for something else. Jersey Zoo have recently teamed up with Madagascar to help research and study the species. With scouts unable to locate more individuals, it has become a possibility that experts will have to bring the survivors back to Jersey, using expertise from the Madagascar teal and Meller's duck to help the duck get back from the brink.

In 1995 the Antiguan racer was dubbed the world's rarest snake. More recently the species have been relocated back to Antigua on some islands where they are free from predators and pests.

== Durrell Wildlife Camp ==
Work began on the Durrell Wildlife Camp in early 2012, which will allow the park to sell lodging and services to visitors.

A wooded copse to the west of Les Augrès Manor has been landscaped to provide a nine-metre-square level wooden deck roughly every seven metres. These decks will house twelve geodesic dome-shaped, semi permanent tent structures and a separate shower and toilet cubicle for each. A further two platforms will house a communal structure and a pod for health and beauty treatments.
