= Pierre Barrère =

French physician and naturalist (1690–1755)

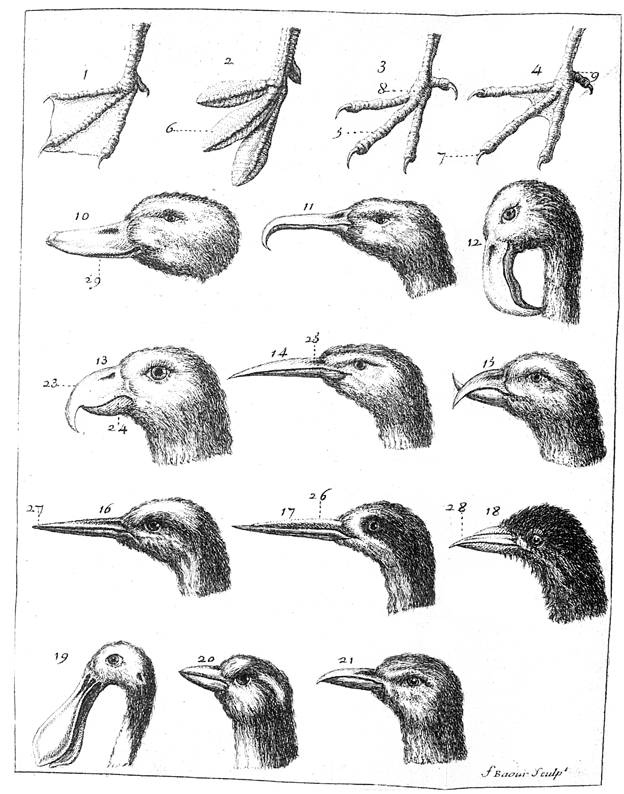
Plate from ''Ornithologiae Specimen de Barrère showing his system of bird classification

Pierre Barrère (1690, Perpignan, Roussillon – 1 November 1755, Perpignan) was a French physician and naturalist. Barrère practised in Perpignan from 1717. His thesis on medical botany brought him into contact with Antoine de Jussieu who helped him become a naval surgeon. In 1722, he voyaged to Cayenne where he stayed for five years. Back in Perpignan, he became professor of botany at the university and doctor in the military hospital. The plant genus Barreria was named after him but it is now a synonym of Brunia. He is commemorated in Vanilla barrereana.

== Ornithology ==
In 1745 he published his Ornithologiae Specimen Novum, sive Series Avium in Ruscinone, Pyrenaeis Montibus, atque in Galliâ Aequinoctiali Observatarum, in Classes, genera & species, novâ methodo, digesta at Perpignan.

His classification, entirely based on the form of the beak and feet, divided the birds into four groups : les palmipèdes, les demi-palmipèdes, les fissipèdes et les demi-fissipèdes. Within these groups there was no rank above genera and species and these were more or less disordered. His very artificial classification was soon abandoned. The work was dedicated to Buffon.

== Medicine ==
Barrère published Observations anatomiques tirées des ouvertures d’un grand nombre de cadavres in 1753 at Perpignan. As anonymous the Dissertation sur la cause physique de la couleur des nègres, de la qualité de leurs cheveux, et de la dégénération de l’un et de l’autre, Paris, chez Pierre-Guillaume Simon, 1741. He claimed, based on cadaver dissections, that the bile of black people was black.

== Fossils ==
He published in 1746 his Observations sur l'origine et la formation des pierres figurées, et sur celles qui, tant extérieurement qu'intérieurement, ont une figure régulière & déterminée at Paris. He was interested in the origin and the nature of fossils and described many from Catalonia and the Pyrenees. He proposed that the fossils of marine mollusks proved the presence of an ancient ocean.

== Account of Guyana ==
Barrère published two more works, these on his observations in Guyana. These were Essai sur l'histoire naturelle de la France équinoxiale, ou Dénombrement des plantes, des animaux et des minéraux qui se trouvent dans l'isle de Cayenne, les isles de Remire, sur les côtes de la mer et dans le continent de la Guyane (1741) and Nouvelle Relation de la France équinoxiale, contenant la description des côtes de la Guiane, de l'île de Cayenne, le commerce de cette colonie, les divers changements arrivés dans ce pays, et les mœurs et coutumes des différents peuples sauvages qui l'habitent; avec les figures dessinées sur les lieux (1743).

== Other sources ==
- Michael Walters (2003). A Concise History of Ornithology. Yale University Press (New Haven, Connecticut) 255 p.
