= List of Swallows and Amazons characters =

This is a listing of characters from the Swallows and Amazons series of books by Arthur Ransome.

== The Swallows ==
- John Walker — eldest of the Walker children and Captain of the Swallow
- Susan Walker — Mate of the Swallow and the cook and domestic organiser
- Titty Walker — Able Seaman of the Swallow and the most imaginative of the Walkers. This name was the nickname of the real life Mavis Altounyan, taken from Joseph Jacobs's children's story Titty Mouse and Tatty Mouse. The name has caused amusement among generations of children since, causing it to be changed to Kitty in the original 1963 television series of Swallows and Amazons and Tatty for a 2016 BBC Films adaptation (but in the 1974 BBC adaptation she was Titty).
- Roger Walker — initially Ship's Boy, later Able Seaman (and Ship's Engineer in Great Northern?), mischievous, mechanical and very fond of chocolate. He is the second-youngest of the children. He was named after Roger Altounyan.
- Bridget Walker — Ship's Baby who proves to be a brave member of the crew in Secret Water. Referred to as Vicky in Swallows and Amazons because of her supposed resemblance to Queen Victoria.

== The Amazons ==
- Nancy Blackett (real name: Ruth) — Captain of the Amazon; an enterprising leader. She is an imaginative and lively tomboy who is always willing to create fantasies and adventures. Though brash and short-tempered, she has a heart of gold and is always quick to defend the weaker and less-confident characters in the tales
- Peggy Blackett (real name: Margaret) — Mate of the Amazon, Nancy's sister; although a bit timid and unassuming, she tries to live up to Nancy's expectations.

== The Ds ==
- Dorothea Callum — imaginative romantic novelist introduced in Winter Holiday with her brother.
- Dick Callum — Dorothea's younger brother. Scientific and thoughtful, he often comes up with solutions to technical problems. Though younger than his sister, Dick is Captain of the Scarab and she the First Mate.

== The Coots ==
- Tom Dudgeon — competent sailor, owner and skipper of the Titmouse and (briefly) captain of the Teasel on the Norfolk Broads, in Coot Club and The Big Six.
- Bess "Port" Farland — left-handed twin and expert yacht racer
- Nell "Starboard" Farland — right-handed twin and expert yacht racer

The Death and Glories (surnames never stated):

- Joe — co-owner of the Death and Glory and owner of a white rat, 'Ratty'
- Bill — co-owner of the Death and Glory
- Pete — is the youngest co-owner of the Death and Glory and keenest fisher of the crew

== The Eels ==
- Don (The Mastodon) — Chief of the Eels (in Secret Water)
- Daisy — Fierce and bold, acts like the chief most of the time, even though she is the youngest Eel.
- Dum — Eel, elder brother and best eeler of the tribe.
- Dee — Eel, younger brother, though older than Daisy,

== Friendly Natives ==
- James Turner also known as Captain Flint or Uncle Jim — the well-travelled brother of Mrs Blackett and therefore uncle to Nancy and Peggy Blackett, by whom he is considered "unfriendly" at the beginning of Swallows and Amazons. He is given his nickname by the Walker family (the Swallows) after Captain Flint of Treasure Island. After differences are resolved he becomes the closest adult ally to the Swallows and the Amazons and joins them in many adventures.
- Molly Blackett (real name: Mary) — mother of Nancy and Peggy Blackett (Peter Duck is dedicated to Mrs Robert Blackett and Mrs E.H.R. Walker)
- Mrs Walker — called Mother (or Mary by Ted) — mother of the Swallows. Australian by birth, she gives her children more freedom than was common at the time.
- Cdr Walker — called Daddy ('Ted' by Mrs Walker/Mary) — father of the Swallows and sender of the famous telegram "Better drowned than duffers if not duffers won't drown"
- Professor and Mrs Callum — parents of the Ds; Prof Callum is an archaeologist
- Jim Brading — owner of the Goblin in We Didn't Mean To Go To Sea which he lends to Cdr Walker in Secret Water
- Timothy Stedding — friend of Captain Flint, originally known as Squashy Hat the rival prospector in Pigeon Post
- Dr Dudgeon, Mrs Dudgeon and "our baby" — Tom's family
- A.P — Mr Farland, Port and Starboard's father, the "Aged Parent" and neighbour to Dr Dudgeon. A widower, he works as a solicitor in Norwich. Not named in the book, but is addressed as "Frank" in the movie.
- Mrs McGinty — Housekeeper to Mr. Farland. A kind, caring, but rather no-nonsense lady, she expresses quiet disapproval regarding the twins' often racing off to partake of their adventures instead of doing household chores or being home in time for meals.
- Mrs Barrable — Custodian of the Teasel. The children decide to make her "Admiral" of the "fleet" consisting of the Teasel and the Titmouse.
- Jim Wooddall — skipper of Sir Garnet, the fastest wherry on the Bure. Port and Starboard work their passage (peeling potatoes) when Sir Garnet is late with her tide and is thus able to give them a lift down to Yarmouth.
- The Billies — Old Billy and Young Billy, father and son charcoal burners, who befriend the Swallows in Swallows and Amazons and Young Billy treats Roger for his sprained ankle in Swallowdale. Young Billy is over 70 and Old Billy is 94.
- Mr & Mrs Jackson — farmers at Holly Howe, the Swallows' initial holiday location. They own the Swallow.
- Mr & Mrs Dixon — farmers at Dixon's Farm, where the Swallows often go for milk and where Dick and Dorothea stay during Winter Holiday. Mrs Dixon was nurse to Dick and Dorothea's mother when she was young. She is famous for her pork pies and also makes toffee and fudge.
- Silas — cowhand at Dixon's Farm, where the Swallows often go for milk and where Dick and Dorothea stay during Winter Holiday. Silas and Mr Dixon make the Ds' sledge following the rescue by Dick of the cragfast sheep.
- Mr & Mrs Swainson and Mary Swainson (their granddaughter) — Farmers at Swainson's Farm where the Swallows go for milk when shipwrecked in Swallowdale; Neddy who is 90 sings them a song. Mrs Swainson is famous for patchwork quilts (mentioned in Swallowdale and in Winter Holiday). Mary darns Roger's shorts after he has slid down the Knickerbockerbreaker in Swallowdale. She also rows the Great Aunt, Miss Maria Turner, over to Captain Flint's houseboat on her way to the railway station for her holiday in The Picts and the Martyrs.
- Jacky Warriner — farmer's son met briefly by Roger and Titty in Swallowdale, in The Picts And The Martyrs he brings milk for the Ds, lends them his saw which they find in the Dogs Home, shows them how to store milk under a stone covering a scooped-out hollow in moss, teaches them to guddle trout in the beck and also gives them a rabbit and an onion.
- Mrs Tyson and her son Robin — In Pigeon Post; she is apprehensive about fires and they are glad to escape from Tyson's Farm to the campsite by the spring (Titty's Well). Robin lends them a crowbar for the sinking of the well.
- Mrs M. Braithwaite — usually called Cook — cook to the Blackett family.
- Mr Tedder properly PC Tedder — a local policeman who Mrs. Barrable befriends.

== Other friendly characters ==
- Peter Duck – elderly sailor with a story of treasure in the book of the same name. He also previously appears in Swallowdale as Titty's imaginary friend; the implication is that both he and Missee Lee were actually just fictional figures who were invented by the children and that the subsequent title-stories about them were also made up by the children and thus were not actually part of their "real-life" adventures as related in the other nine novels.
- Bill – cabin boy of the Viper who joins the crew of the Wild Cat in Peter Duck
- Missee Lee (or Miss Lee) – Chinese Cambridge-educated pirate leader in the book of the same name
- Slater Bob – an old slate miner who tells the children tales of a lost gold seam in Pigeon Post

== Unfriendly Natives ==
- Maria Turner, also known as Great Aunt Maria, the Great Aunt or The G.A. – the childhood guardian of James Turner and Molly Turner, whose parents are never named. Jim and Molly address her as "Aunt Maria" and she held considerable sway as head of the family, even after Molly's marriage to Bob Blackett. As a parent figure to their mother, Great Aunt Maria clearly thought of herself as something of a grandmother-figure to her great-nieces Nancy and Peggy Blackett. However, their view of her as some sort of distant relative, as well as an overprotective adventure-spoiler, forms the basis of the conflict. Of the twelve completed books in the series, she makes appearances in two, Swallowdale and The Picts and the Martyrs.
- George Owdon – a spoiled and contemptuously-vengeful Norfolk boy, older than Tom Dudgeon, in Coot Club and The Big Six. Not only does he smoke cigarettes and otherwise behave obnoxiously, but although he comes from a wealthy family and thus has no need for extra pocket-money, he also steals endangered birds' eggs to sell illegally, so is an enemy of the Coots.
- Ralph Strakey – a friend and accomplice of George Owdon in The Big Six, in which George and Ralph attempt to frame the Coots for theft and for setting adrift moored boats, both of which the two teenage conspirators had actually committed themselves. But because Tom Dudgeon already had a "prior" due to his actually having set the Margoletta adrift to keep its noisy crew from disturbing the coots' nest, George and Ralph dishonestly use this fact to their advantage.
- The Hullabaloos – a party of five (three men and two women) who hire the Margoletta in Coot Club. Last seen in gaudy but wet yachting gear and beach pyjamas being escorted to a hotel in Yarmouth after having rammed a post on Breydon Water. They are called Ronald, James and 'Livy' (Olivia?), plus an unnamed man and unnamed woman (called Jerry and Maude in the TV series Swallows and Amazons Forever).
- Mr Jemmerling – an egg collector and owner of the Pterodactyl in Great Northern?
- The Dogmudgeon – Scottish head ghillie and one of the Gaels who at first stalk the explorers in Great Northern? but later assists them against Mr. Jemmerling.
- The Young Chieftain and his father The McGinty who capture Mr Jemmerling in Great Northern?; they initially think the shore party have been sent to drive the deer from their traditional breeding ground.

== Other unfriendly characters ==
- Taicoon Chang and Taicoon Wu — leaders of the Three Island Pirates who want to chop off heads in Missee Lee.
- Black Jake and the crew of the Viper — five criminals who are after Peter Duck's treasure. The porter says Black Jake has "got the scum of the place with him in that hooker of his". Bill describes them: Simeon Boon just out from two years hard, Mogandy the negro, George (a brother of Black Jake, who is wanted by the police) and a man with a scarred face who was chucker-out or bruiser at the Ketch as Ketch Can (a fisherman's tavern in Lowestoft).

== Animal characters ==
- Polly – Ship's parrot, given to Titty by Captain Flint at the end of Swallows and Amazons. Also features in Peter Duck, Swallowdale and Missee Lee.
- Gibber – Ship's monkey, promised to Roger by Captain Flint at the end of Swallows and Amazons. Only features in Peter Duck and Missee Lee. In Swallowdale and "Winter Holiday" he is referred to as being on holiday at the zoo.
- Sinbad – Ship's kitten, rescued by John when found clinging to a chicken coop in the middle of the North Sea during We Didn't Mean to Go to Sea, he also features in Secret Water.
- William – the noble and heroic pug who braved the mud to save the crew of the Teasel from going hungry on Breydon Water in Coot Club; also in The Big Six
- Bess – Jacky Warriner's sheepdog in The Picts and the Martyrs
- Roy – the Dixon's sheepdog in Winter Holiday
- Ringman – the Jacksons' sheepdog in Winter Holiday
- Ratty - Joe's white rat in Coot Club and The Big Six
