= List of places in Arthur Ransome books =

This is a listing of places from the Swallows and Amazons series of books by Arthur Ransome. Arthur Ransome wrote detailed descriptions of the locations in his books and based many of them on real places that he knew personally or had read about.

== By the Lake ==
The geography of the novels set in the Lake District is less faithful to the real world, but many locations have been identified, either by Ransome himself or by diligent readers.

- The Lake: This appears to be a mix of Windermere and Coniston Water in the English Lake District. The topography of the lake is similar to Windermere, but the surrounding countryside more closely resembles the land around Coniston.
- Rio: The principal town beside the Lake. It is based on Bowness-on-Windermere.
- Holly Howe: The farm where the Walkers stay and the home port of the Swallow. This is modelled after Bank Ground Farm on the east side of Coniston Water.
- Wild Cat Island: The island where the Swallows and Amazons camp is based on Blake Holme in Windermere, but the Secret Harbour at the south end comes from Peel Island in Coniston Water.
- Kanchenjunga: The mountain climbed in Swallowdale is based on Coniston Old Man, named Kanchenjunga because of a well-known expedition to climb the Himalayan mountain while Ransome was writing the book. The Amazons' parents and Captain Flint had called it the Matterhorn when they climbed it thirty years earlier.
- Strickland Junction where the Swallows transferred to the branch line to Rio is Oxenholme. Roger releases a pigeon at Oxenholme station at the start of Pigeon Post.
- Beckfoot The home of the Amazons and their mother, Molly Blackett; on the Amazon River where it flows into the Lake. Appears in Pigeon Post and The Picts and the Martyrs.

== East Anglia ==
Generally Ransome was much more faithful to real geography while writing the books set in this part of England. The towns, villages and waterways in the area are generally given their real names and the descriptions match, apart from changes brought about since the books were written.

- Coot Club and The Big Six are set in and about Horning, a village on the River Bure in the northern Norfolk Broads.
- We Didn't Mean to Go to Sea starts at Pin Mill on the River Orwell upstream from the ports of Felixstowe and Harwich. Ransome sailed the Nancy Blackett from the River Orwell to Flushing when researching the book.

== Essex ==
The book set in Essex is also faithful to the real geography of the area.

- Secret Water is set in and around Hamford Water, close to the resort town of Walton-on-the-Naze.

== Other books ==
Ransome based the geography of the other three books, Peter Duck, Missee Lee and Great Northern? on various books, and often from his own experience.

- Crab Island: The treasure island of Peter Duck was based on the volcanic Brazilian island of Trindade described in E.F. Knight's book The Cruise of the Alerte.
- The Hebridean setting of Great Northern? was based on a fishing trip Ransome made to Lewis in the Outer Hebrides when researching the area for the book.
- The Chinese setting of Missee Lee reflects a visit Arthur Ransome made to China in 1926 & 1927 for the Manchester Guardian. He supported the Kuomintang rather than the British-backed warlords, and concluded that China was the most loathsome place he had ever visited.
