= Swallows and Amazons (disambiguation) =

Swallows and Amazons is a 1930 children's novel by Arthur Ransome.

Swallows and Amazons may also refer to:

- Swallows and Amazons series, a series of novels by Ransome beginning with Swallows and Amazons

Adaptations of the original novel:

- Swallows and Amazons (TV series), a 1963 BBC TV version
- Swallows and Amazons (1974 film)
- Swallows and Amazons (2016 film)

== See also ==
- Swallows and Amazons Forever!, a 1984 BBC TV series based on some of the later books in the series
