= Nancy Blackett =

Fictional character in books by Arthur Ransome

Nancy Blackett is a fictional character in nine of the twelve juvenile novels in Arthur Ransome's Swallows and Amazons series of books. She acts as captain of the dinghy, Amazon and usually directing her friends in their various adventures. Nancy apparently has no real-world counterpart as an inspirational source for Ransome but appears to be completely the author's creation. Nancy is sometimes critically viewed as a subversive character for girl readers. The character appeared in a 1963 BBC television adaptation of Swallows and Amazons as well as in the 1974 and 2016 film adaptations of the book.

== Role in the series ==
At the opening of the series in Swallows and Amazons, Nancy is 12 years old and lives with her younger sister Peggy and her widowed mother in a large Lakeland house called Beckfoot. In common with his treatment of many of his other characters, Ransome does not give a detailed description of Nancy, merely describing her as "bigger than John" (Walker). She is something of a tomboy who captains a dinghy called Amazon, usually wears a red knitted pirate cap and blue shorts. She often uses nautical or piratical words in her speech, such as "Jibbooms and bobstays" or the classic "shiver my timbers." In her first appearance in Swallows and Amazons, Peggy reveals that "Nancy" is itself a nickname derived from her affection for pirates: her real name is Ruth, which she changed to Nancy after her Uncle Jim pointed out that pirates are "ruthless."She usually takes the lead in their adventures. Nancy has a lively imagination and usually thinks up adventures for her friends, which she makes more exciting by imagining an exotic background such as climbing Kanchenjunga in Swallowdale instead of just a local mountain. Nancy is still a prime mover of the action even when she is prevented from taking direct part, such as when she is quarantined with mumps in Winter Holiday, or when she and Peggy are kept at home when the Great Aunt comes to stay in The Picts and the Martyrs.

== Character summary ==
"Nancy takes charge - loading Captain Flint" Detail of an illustration by Arthur Ransome from Swallowdale showing Nancy as visualised by her creator

Her upbringing in a single-parent household with only intermittent male influence of her uncle has been suggested as a contributing factor towards her independence and sturdy self-reliance. Unlike John Walker, the Captain of Swallow, who defers to his father's judgements and seeks approval before acting, Nancy makes and acts on decisions for herself. For some, Nancy has an immature view of the world while John is more mature, dismissing Nancy's suggestion that they could live on Wildcat Island all year round as impractical.

Nancy matures through the series and latterly uses her energy to support the needs of the younger members of the group.

Nancy is not without fault and her flexible standards of honesty, particularly when contrasted with the rigid code of John and the Swallows has been suggested as one of the reasons for her popularity as it makes her seem "more alive for today's reader".

== Origin ==
Unlike a number of his other characters whose origins were firmly rooted in reality, no direct original has been identified for Nancy, although there have been a number of unproven suggestions. They include Dora Collingwood, daughter of writer William Collingwood, whom Ransome first met on Peel Island in 1896, and Taqui Altounyan, daughter of Dora Collingwood and the oldest of the Altounyan children who were models for the Swallows. Ransome himself was never explicit about the inspiration for Nancy, saying only that he had once seen two small girls in red caps playing on the shore of Coniston Water near his house. Another suggestion is that she was based on Georgina Rawdon Smith, whose father had been at Rugby with Ransome, and who, with her sister Pauline, met and played with the Altounyan children on the shores of Coniston.

Ransome's own relationship with Nancy was complex. He recognised that her character defined and led the plots but also acknowledged that other characters were dominated and diminished by her presence. Discussing the plot of Winter Holiday in a letter to his mother dated 2 March 1929 he wrote "the main point of the new book is that two other children turn up... ...and then get involved in one of Captain Nancy's colossal plans for adventure" but later in the same paragraph he mentions the more prominent role that Peggy will play "who in previous books has never really had a fair chance, being so much dominated by Nancy".

== Critical commentary ==
When Ransome was first writing Swallows and Amazons in 1928, it was unusual for a female character like Nancy to display such active leadership over male characters. Whilst children in children's literature had become increasingly self-motivated towards the end of the 19th century, they were, until Swallows and Amazons, still largely bounded by a "closed nursery-orientated world". In Secret Water, Daisy is the leader of the "Eels" despite being younger than her brothers Dum and Dee.

However, despite Nancy's unconventional role, Peter Hunt suggests that Ransome can still be accused of sexism as Susan Walker's domesticity reinforces the common views of the time; however, he points out that gender is unimportant in Ransome's work.

Despite ageing from about twelve to fifteen over the series Nancy, in common with all the children in Ransome's books, shows no sign of developing any interest in sex; in this Ransome is merely reflecting the historical and cultural context of the time, as "Children's fiction in the 1930s had found no way of writing about sex." Victor Watson, a critic of children's fiction, proposes that Nancy's principal role in the books is to open up "possibilities" and "disrupt the comfortable certainties of the Walker family". He observes that she is a force of goodness, especially in the way she deals with her adult counterpart, the Great Aunt, in The Picts and the Martyrs. Nancy shares many characteristics with the Great Aunt, but she displays a "heroic generosity" which the Great Aunt does not have, and does not share the adult's innate cruelty.

In 1960, a possible path for Nancy's adult life was proposed when critic Hugh Shelley postulated that she might have found the Second World War liberating and become a WREN. He suggested that "as a character one feels she could not be transmuted into a normal, satisfactory adult". Recent analysis of Shelley's work by Katherine Holden has concluded the suggestion is a veiled reference to lesbianism and this, as well as his idea that Nancy would have eventually grown to be like her spinster Great Aunt Maria, has been dismissed as reflecting the homophobia of the time when Shelley was writing. Today, Nancy is viewed as a subversive figure who, in the context of interwar Britain, offered young girls the possibility of an alternative route to adulthood. The character has been cited by feminist author and academic Sara Maitland as a childhood role model "who transcended the restriction of femininity without succumbing to the lure of male-identification" and a "hero who had all the characteristics necessary for the job; who lived between the countries of the material and the imaginary".

== Film and television ==
Nancy Blackett has been portrayed in television and film. Amanda Coxell (now known as Mandy Harper) played the character in the 1963 BBC television adaptation of Swallows and Amazons.

A little over ten years later, Kit Seymour portrayed Nancy in a 1974 film adaptation.

She was played by Seren Hawkes in the Swallows and Amazons 2016 film adaptation.

== See also ==
- Nancy Blackett – Ransome's sailing cutter named after his favourite character
- Blackett (family name)

== Bibliography ==
- Brogan, Hugh (1984). The Life of Arthur Ransome. London: Jonathan Cape. ISBN 0-224-02010-2.
- Hardyment, Christina (1984). Arthur Ransome and Captain Flint's Trunk. Jonathan Cape. ISBN 0-224-02989-4.
- Holden, Katherine (2008). The Shadow of Marriage: Singleness in England, 1914–60. Manchester University Press. ISBN 978-0-7190-6892-8.
- Hunt, Peter (1991). Approaching Arthur Ransome. Jonathan Cape. ISBN 0-224-03288-7.
- Shelley, Hugh (1960). Arthur Ransome. Bodley Head
- Thompson, Anne (1992). Give Nancy Her Due in Mixed Moss: The Journal of The Arthur Ransome Society I (III)
- Wardale, Roger (1991). Nancy Blackett: Under Sail with Arthur Ransome. London: Jonathan Cape. ISBN 0-224-02773-5.
- Marshall, Pauline (1991). Where It All Began : The Origins of Swallows and Amazons
