= Great Northern? =

1947 children's book by Arthur Ransome

- Typical cover art depicting a montage of Arthur Ransome's own illustrations from the book
- Author: Arthur Ransome
- Cover artist: Arthur Ransome
- Language: English
- Series: Swallows and Amazons series
- Genre: Children's books
- Publisher: Jonathan Cape
- Publication date: 1947
- Publication place: United Kingdom
- Media type: Print (hard and paperback)
- ISBN: 1-56792-259-7 (David R. Godine, Publisher: paperback, 2009)
- OCLC: 54026728
- Preceded by: The Picts And The Martyrs
- Followed by: Coots in the North

Great Northern? is the twelfth and final completed book of Arthur Ransome's Swallows and Amazons series of children's books. It was published in 1947. In this book, the three families of major characters in the series, the Swallows (the Walker family), the Amazons (the Blackett sisters) and the Ds (the two Callums), are all reunited in a book for the first time since Pigeon Post. This book is set in the Outer Hebrides and the two familiar Ransome themes of sailing and ornithology come to the fore.

== Sources ==
For this story, Ransome was inspired by an adult fan, Myles North, an avid birdwatcher who wrote a letter to Ransome which supplied a detailed outline of much of the basic plot. He also supplied the famous phrase "What's hit's history: what's missed's mystery". Ransome also made a visit to the Isle of Lewis in the Outer Hebrides for a fishing trip and to research the area as the setting for the book.

The fictional cutter Sea Bear in the story is based on Teddy, the vessel sailed by Norwegian writer and sailor Erling Tambs from Oslo to the South Seas in 1928. Tambs's account of the voyage, The Cruise of the "Teddy", was published in 1933, with a foreword by Ransome.

== Plot summary ==
The Swallows, Amazons and Ds are all on a sailing cruise with Captain Flint in the Outer Hebrides. While the older members of the party clean Sea Bear, before returning her to the owner, the younger ones explore inland and a mysterious bird is seen nesting on an island in a loch. The question arises whether it is a great northern diver, which has never been known to nest in the British Isles, or a black-throated diver.

Mr Jemmerling, the expert whom they consult, turns out to be a deadly enemy of the birds, as he collects birds' eggs and stuffed skins of birds. Hence they try to protect the birds while gathering photographic evidence of their nesting. Complicating the matter is a misunderstanding with the local Scottish inhabitants or Gaels who are mostly Gaelic speaking, and believe that their visitors have been sent by rival landowners to spoil the deer-shooting (the local livelihood) by driving the deer from their traditional breeding grounds. While trying to distract Jemmerling and his employee, the children and Captain Flint are rounded up by the ghillies (gamekeepers or gamewardens) of the local laird (called "The McGinty") and locked in a barn. They succeed in attracting the laird's attention and eventually in explaining what is going on, and his conviction is reinforced by the sound of a gunshot, which angers the laird and alters his view. He turns out to be a person of impeccably good manners who apologises profusely to his visitors for the way they have been treated. His son Ian ("the young chieftain") also befriends the children, and everyone delights in the recovery of the divers' eggs and their restoration to the nest before they have gone cold. Ransome entrusts this task to Titty and Dick, the two characters whom his biographer Hugh Brogan considered to be Ransome's favourites, because they contained the most of his own personality. Ransome was personally a strong supporter of the protection of birds, and had previously advocated it in his novel Coot Club to which cross-reference is made in this book.

As the plot involves more excitement and violence than usual, with the egg-collector attempting to shoot the rare bird of the title and a sailor in his employ attempts to shoot dogs, some have classified this book as one of the metafictional stories in the series: a fantasy tale made up by the children themselves. The other two books generally agreed to be metafictional are Peter Duck and Missee Lee.

However, Arthur Ransome himself made it clear that this story was not metafiction. Writing to Myles North, discussing the book's dedication, he says:

...At all costs it must do nothing to weaken the reality ... nothing to suggest that it is a mere story and not the record of an actual happening, even if for bird protection's sake, the details are somewhat disguised. (AR's own emphasis)
