= SY Gondola =

Steam-powered passenger ship located on Coniston Water, England

Coordinates: 54°21′55.44″N 3°03′46.57″W

- Gondola on Coniston Water.

History

United Kingdom
- Name: Gondola
- Owner: Furness Railway (1859–1922); London, Midland and Scottish Railway (1923–44); Private (1945-70s); National Trust (since the 1970s)
- Operator: Furness Railway (1859–1922); London, Midland and Scottish Railway (1923–36); National Trust (since 1979)
- Port of registry: Barrow
- Builder: 1859 – Jones, Quiggin & Co., Liverpool; 1979 – Vickers Shipbuilders, Barrow
- Cost: £1050
- Yard number: The rebuilt hull is the only ship built at Vickers not to be numbered
- Launched: 1859
- Recommissioned: 1979
- Out of service: 1936-79
- Refit: Every November - March
- Motto: 'Cavendo Tutus'

General characteristics
- Type: Steam yacht
- Tonnage: 42
- Length: 84ft
- Beam: 13ft 6inches
- Draught: 4ft 6inches
- Installed power: V twin steam engine
- Propulsion: Propeller
- Speed: 11.7 knots (13.5 mph; 21.7 km/h) maximum speed, 8 knots (9.2 mph; 15 km/h) cruise speed
- Capacity: 86
- Crew: 3
- Time to activate: 1.5 hours

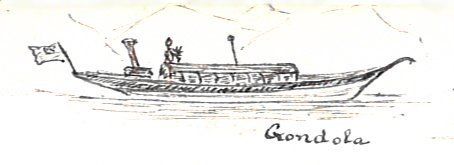
Sketch of Gondola in 1890

The steam yacht Gondola is a rebuilt Victorian, screw-propelled, steam-powered passenger vessel on Coniston Water, England. Originally launched in 1859, she was built for the steamer service carrying passengers from the Furness Railway and from the Coniston Railway. She was in commercial service until 1936 when she was retired, being converted to a houseboat in 1946. In 1979, by now derelict, she was given a new hull, engine, boiler and most of the superstructure. She is back in service as a passenger boat, still powered by steam and now operated by the National Trust.

Gondola is one of the inspirations for Captain Flint's houseboat in Arthur Ransome's book Swallows and Amazons. In Coniston's Ruskin Museum there is a black and white post card of Gondola that Ransome sent to his illustrator, with changes to the outline in ink to show how he wanted the houseboat to look.

== History ==
=== The original Gondola ===
Originally trained in railway engineering, by the late 1850s James Ramsden - first mayor of Barrow-in-Furness (1867) - had become a director of both the Coniston Railway Co. that ran the Foxfield-Coniston line and of the Furness Railway Co. that ran the line from Barrow to Windermere. He had visited Venice in the early years of the decade, and it seems he encountered a style of Venetian boat called a Burchiello, as depicted in some of Canaletto's paintings. These were large wooden barges which between the 16th and 18th centuries carried wealthy passengers along the Riviera del Brenta between Venice and Padua in elegant cabins, luxuriously upholstered and decorated with Corinthian columns and mirrors. Emulating their flowing lines and level of comfort, he proposed an outline design and commissioned a steam yacht for Coniston Water from Jones, Quiggin & Co. of Liverpool. Douglas Hebson, the naval architect, finalised the details of boat and engine. At a cost of 1,000 guineas (£1,050 or equivalent to £114,000 in 2025), Steam Yacht Gondola was to have not only a state-of-the-art boiler and engine borrowed from railway locomotive technology but also an innovative mild steel hull, riveted to frames of Low Moor wrought iron, quite a special material which was also used for the gunwale, and one of the new screw propellers as adopted by Brunel for the SS Great Britain, not to mention the opulent internal finish.

From Liverpool she went in sections by rail and cart to the slipway at Pier Cottage near Coniston Hall, where she was assembled. She was launched on 30 November 1859. She was 84 feet (26 m) long and registered to carry 200 passengers. The Illustrated London News of 7 July 1860 reported after her maiden voyage that the first class saloon was "beautifully finished in walnut wood and cushioned and decorated after the style of the royal carriages of our railways." It continued: "The vessel… is a perfected combination of the Venetian gondola and the English steam yacht – having the elegance, comfort and speed of the latter, and the graceful lightness and quiet gliding motion of the former. It may be said to be the most elegant little steam vessel yet designed, and is especially suitable for pleasure excursions on lake or river."

As Secretary and General Manager of the Furness Railway Company, Ramsden must have been aiming to expand the business from simply carrying freight and a modest number of locals. The Victorian leisure market was growing rapidly, and in particular the popularity of the Lake District as a tourist destination. Doubtless this was fuelled by the Romantic landscape paintings of Turner, Constable and Friedrich and by the works of the Lake District's very own poets, Wordsworth, Coleridge and Southey. Passengers would now be able to reach the southern end of Coniston Water: first by rail to Greenodd and thence by road to Lake Bank. They could then continue northwards on the new steam yacht in real comfort towards more spectacular scenery. Soon the Furness Railway Co. and the Coniston Railway Co. would merge, so Ramsden's vision also took account of the new Foxfield-Coniston rail line, allowing sight-seers to arrive at the northern end of Gondola's run.

In time Gondola formed part of what came to be known as the Great Circle itinerary, introduced to boost flagging revenues by Sir Alfred Aslett, Ramsden's successor at the Furness Railway. The nickname presumably intended to echo the Grand Tour, which still only the wealthiest could possibly afford. Lancashire's increasingly prosperous middle classes could take a paddle steamer from Fleetwood to Barrow and thence by rail to Lakeside on Windermere. A steam vessel up the length of Windermere provided the link to Waterhead, from where a coach and four brought travellers to the delights of Coniston Water. Gondola would return them in fitting style to the southern end of the lake, before continuing by road and rail to Barrow and so by paddle steamer back to Fleetwood. All this was at a cost of ten shillings and sixpence first class, seven shillings and sixpence second class - considerable sums at the time. It would be the equivalent of £55 and £40 in 2016 prices. This gives a good indication of just how much the better-off Victorians now valued their leisure. In her hey-day before the First World War, Gondola was carrying upwards of 25,000 passengers a year. From Brantwood, his home overlooking Coniston, John Ruskin, author of The Stones of Venice and critic of steam power, must have seen her passing back and forth each day.

The outbreak of the Great War saw Gondola being laid up for the duration, but with the peace in 1918 came a return to regular service. As roads improved, however, demand for such water-borne transport dwindled, and in 1936 she was retired. Shortly before the Second World War she was sold to the McAdam family, greengrocers in Barrow, who in 1944 had her boiler and engine removed. Eventually in 1946 the spaces these had occupied were used for a galley and wash-house in Gondola's new role as a static, floating home.

Gondola is one of the inspirations for Captain Flint's houseboat in Arthur Ransome's children's classic Swallows and Amazons. In Coniston's Ruskin Museum there is a black and white post card of Gondola that Ransome sent to his illustrator, with changes to the outline in ink to show how he wanted the houseboat to look.

Gondola spent the next two decades moored off Water Park at the southern end of Coniston, near the outfall of the River Crake (Ransome's Amazon), and half a mile north of Allan Tarn (Octopus Lagoon), gradually deteriorating. A severe storm in the winter of 1963/64 broke her moorings and ran her aground, leaving her damaged and uninhabitable. She came close to being sold for scrap. But Arthur Hatton, caretaker at Water Park, purchased her from the McAdams to save her from that ultimate fate. Instead, she was deliberately sunk to slow down her deterioration, at least for the time being. And there she lay for the next ten years.

=== Rebuild ===
A first attempt to restore her in the mid-1970s met with financial problems. But then Anthony Lord, the National Trust's local boss, took up her case. With support from the community, fund-raising by National Trust staff, donations from local benefactors and sponsorship from large companies, enough money was raised to acquire her and complete a hull survey to assess the damage caused by the storm and to establish whether a full restoration, preferably to a working passenger yacht, was feasible. The survey was disappointing: the hull was seen to be down to a third of the original 1/8" thickness in places. But even if the hull had been in good condition, the Department of Trade would not have registered her as a working vessel, the modern standards requiring a hull twice as thick.

Vickers Shipbuilders at Barrow-in-Furness were approached and asked to make their own survey to see what could be done. They reported that a new hull would be needed and that the superstructure would have to be replaced entirely. Furthermore, if she were to be steam powered once again, a suitable engine and boiler would have to be sourced. The original wrought iron gunwale plate - the curved edge of the ship where the deck meets the hull - was salvageable, however, and could form part of the new hull. Some of the barley-twist wrought iron handrails and railings were reusable, along with many of the bronze and brass deck fittings. Vickers were invited to proceed with work and further funds were raised from the same sources as before. The famous yard readily undertook the project. To get the original hull to Barrow, it was cut into three sections, which then had to be reassembled before work on the new hull could begin, using the lines of the original boat.

Locomotion Enterprises, a training company in the North-East of England, got the task of building the new engine whilst W Bertram & Sons of South Shields provided a new high-pressure boiler, to the Ffestiniog Railway's SB3 design, as used on their locomotive Mountaineer. Vickers shipyard itself undertook the task of making the new hull, using it as an engineering exercise for the apprentices, probably more at home with the hulls of nuclear submarines! They used mild steel, laid in narrow strakes to mimic the riveted plates of the original.

All the components finally came together, and in 1979 the new hull was transported in parts from Barrow back to Coniston. Gondola was finally reassembled in front of Pier Cottage on the one-time northern jetty for Coniston-bound Victorian passengers. This had been Donald Campbell's base, and long before that the home of Captain Felix Hamill who served as Gondola's Master from 1863 to 1913. Over the next few months the shipyard's carpenters and shipwrights travelled to fit her out with boiler, engine, superstructure, decking and all the finery associated with a vessel of this size and pedigree, including a plush carpeted first class saloon complete with varnished walnut trim, gilded Corinthian columns and Puginesque, faux-vaulted ceiling.

On Lady Day 25 March 1980, the new Gondola was launched by Sheila Howell, great granddaughter of Felix Hamill. The resplendent reincarnation floated a little below her intended lines, but sailed her inaugural voyage at 4pm on 8 June of that year, with the 12th Duke of Devonshire a guest of honour. His ancestor the 7th Duke had been chairman of the Furness Railway back in 1859. As a finishing touch and true to the style of the Venetian Burchiello as depicted by Canaletto, the original twin-tailed serpent and boards carved with the Duke of Devonshire's arms again adorned her prow.

== Specification and continuing evolution ==
Gondola is 86 ft long; she has a beam of 15 ft, a draught of 5 ft and weighs 42 tons. Her steam boiler is of the locomotive type, with 90 one and a quarter inch (35mm) steel tubes passing through the barrel. At first it was an all-copper design as used by the Furness Railway on their locomotives; this supplied steam to her engines at a maximum of 80 psi. Around the beginning of the 20th century she was equipped with an all-steel boiler supplying steam at 100 psi. The boiler and the engines were taken out when she was laid up and converted to a houseboat. When she was re-launched in 1980 an all-steel design was again specified, although this time rated at a maximum working pressure of 150 psi.

Gondola's evolution continues. Early in service the engine was significantly modified by Roger Mallinson of Windermere, a local steam boat engine manufacturer, as it was very noisy and broke down too often. He effectively re-built it to achieve the sweetly running unit that now allows her to run reliably and on time. Today she is powered by a twin cylinder 90 degree "V" steam engine, with a slip eccentric reverse system and a double-acting slide valve arrangement. It develops a maximum torque of about 8,000 N·m (5,900 lb·ft) at the prop shaft, turning the 36" diameter propeller at some 150-160 rpm to give a hull cruising speed of about 8 knots (9 mph or 15 km/h). With all this talk of speed, it is interesting to note the vessel's instruments do not include a speedometer. The instruments comprise: a clock, two pressure gauges (boiler pressure and chest pressure - the latter being the effective pressure fed to the cylinders) and an engineroom thermometer. There is no lighting on board, the vessel operating only in daylight. The only modern aid to navigation is a VHF radio.

From March 2008 the firing of her boiler became more environmentally friendly. From her launch in 1859 she had been coal fired, but she now uses Blazer Logs, commercially produced blocks made from compressed sawdust. These burn more efficiently, giving off little smoke with negligible sulphur content and are carbon negative. The cylinders exhaust to atmosphere after first passing through a silencer. The draught induced by the steam is used to draw the heat and waste products of combustion through the boiler and up the funnel, and so draw more air into the furnace, a force draught system. Now that the ship is using a different fuel to fire the boiler, however, a flue damper has also been fitted to produce a finer tolerance of control in the firebox. This uses less fuel to produce more steam, and hence delivers much greater economy.

During the winter the crew switch from their roles as tour guides and boat operators into boat maintenance specialists, working on the jetty at Pier Cottage to return Gondola to peak condition for the next season. A system of planned maintenance is followed to manage long-term conservation and funding, and the vessel remains certified as a Class V passenger vessel by the Maritime & Coastguard Agency.

== Gondola in service today ==
For today's tourists, from beginning of March to the end of October Gondola plies Coniston Water once more, operated as a thriving enterprise by the National Trust. All cruises start from Coniston pier, calling at Brantwood, Lake Bank, Parkamor and Monk Coniston. One-hour South Lake and North Lake cruises take place every day, with a final Full Lake cruise as the last sailing. The vessel sails anti-clockwise around the lake, and all sailings visit Brantwood, the home of John Ruskin. All sailings visit points around the lake upon which places in Swallows and Amazons are based. The South and Full Lake sailings pass close to Peel Island (Wild Cat Island in the book), whilst the North and Full Lake sailings pass by Bank Ground Farm, Coniston (Holly Howe in the book). All cruises access the scene of Donald Campbell's crash in Bluebird K7. The Full Lake cruise goes to Lake Bank – the extreme south of Coniston Water – the place from where Gondola originally picked up her passengers in the 1860s. The waiting room is still to be seen, restored by the Rawdon Smith Trust to the Furness Railway's livery. North and Full Lake sailings also pass Pier Cottage, where Gondola is maintained and where the Campbells based their boats on Coniston.

Gondola also offers private charter sailings and the 'Engineer for the Day Experience', which gives members of the public the opportunity to join the crew for the day. Arriving first thing in the morning, they can shadow the engineer: lighting the fire to raise steam, polishing the engine and copperwork, oiling round, tending the fire and keeping steam during the day, following the shutting down procedure at the end of the day, interacting with passengers, and experiencing helming (steering) the boat.

Gondola has now operated for 117 years as a passenger vessel on Coniston Water, the last 41 years of these under the conservation and management of the National Trust.
