= Peter Duck =

1932 children's book by Arthur Ransome

- First edition
- Author: Arthur Ransome
- Cover artist: Arthur Ransome
- Language: English
- Series: Swallows and Amazons series
- Genre: Children's books
- Publisher: Jonathan Cape
- Publication date: 1932
- Publication place: United Kingdom
- Media type: Print (Hardcover & Paperback)
- ISBN: 0-613-77197-4; 978-1-56792-429-9 (David R. Godine, Publisher: paperback, 1987, 2010)
- Preceded by: Swallowdale
- Followed by: Winter Holiday

Peter Duck is the third book in the Swallows and Amazons series by Arthur Ransome. The Swallows and Amazons sail to Crab Island with Captain Flint and Peter Duck, an old sailor, to recover buried treasure. During the voyage the Wildcat (Captain Flint's ship) is chased by another vessel, the Viper, whose piratical crew are also intending to recover the treasure.

The book, first published in 1932, is considered to be one of the metafictional books in the series, along with Missee Lee and perhaps Great Northern?. Most of the book was written in Aleppo where Ransome was staying with the Altounyans.

== Chronology ==
By publication date, Peter Duck is the third book in the series, but the story is supposed to be one created by the Swallows and Amazons while staying on a Norfolk wherry with Captain Flint in the winter between the first two books. Two early chapters describing this creation process were written by Arthur Ransome before he started Swallowdale. This opening was discarded from the final version of the book when it was published after Swallowdale. However, Peter Duck is mentioned in Swallowdale as Titty's imaginary friend from a story made up by the Swallows and Amazons.

== Plot summary ==
The Swallows and Amazons are in Lowestoft, preparing for a cruise aboard a schooner, the Wild Cat, with Captain Flint, the Blacketts' uncle Jim Turner. Unfortunately the other adult (Sam Bideford) cannot come and so the cruise is threatened until Peter Duck, an elderly seaman, offers to come along to help. In the harbour a larger black schooner, the Viper, is fitting out for a voyage and Peter Duck's presence aboard the Wild Cat interests Black Jake, the Viper’s captain. Peter Duck spins a yarn about a treasure that he saw being buried long ago, when marooned on a desert island in the Caribbean Sea, and which Black Jake wants to find. When the Wild Cat sails, the Viper is quick to follow and trails her down the English Channel, at one point threatening to board her in the night.

In a fog off Land's End, the crew of the Wild Cat give the Viper the slip but pick up the Viper’s cabin boy, Bill, who has been set adrift to try and fool the Wild Cat’s crew with false signals. They continue across the Atlantic Ocean to Crab Island where they spend several days searching in vain for Peter Duck's treasure.

When a hurricane blows up, Peter Duck and Captain Flint take the Wild Cat out to sea to ride out the storm, leaving the Swallows and Amazons ashore. There is an earthquake during the storm, and when the schooner returns all the paths to the treasure-hunters' camp are blocked by landslides and fallen trees. However, a fallen palm tree exposes a small box, Peter Duck's treasure, which the children recover. They decide to sail round to the anchorage as the land route is blocked.

While Captain Flint attempts to cross the island to rescue the Swallows and Amazons, the Viper arrives and Peter Duck and Bill are captured. The crew of the Viper also go ashore to look for the treasure. The children rescue Peter Duck and Bill, and then the Wild Cat sails back to the other side and they pick up Captain Flint just before Black Jake arrives. They attempt to sail away from the island but the wind dies and the Viper looks like catching them, but they are saved by a waterspout which destroys the Viper. They return home safely without further incident. The contents of the treasure chest proves to be a collection of nautical literature and a sizeable number of pearls, which --- though indeed of considerable value --- turn out to not really be worth the vast fortune that one might have expected in a buccaneer's buried chest. The story's main characters divide up the assets, with funds going to sensible and practical ventures.
