= Big Five (Scotland Yard) =

The Big Five was a nickname given to five superintendents in charge of the Criminal Investigation Department at Scotland Yard, the headquarters of the Metropolitan Police, from about 1906 onwards. The first five to be appointed were: Charles John Arrow, Paul Crane, Walter Dew, Frederick Fox and Frank Froest. These men and their successors, with their subordinate inspectors, regularly worked on high-profile murder cases through the British Isles. By the 1970s, the term was dropping from currency.

While the crime reporters of British newspapers were the first to use the epithet The Big Five, the team's activities became a popular trope with writers of crime fiction, including Edgar Wallace. As well as inspiring conventional detective fiction, "The Big Five" suggested the title for The Big Six, a children's novel in Arthur Ransome's Swallows and Amazons series about group of young detectives.
