= Winter holiday =

Winter holiday may refer to:

- Christmas and holiday season
- Winter holiday, a name sometimes given to the Christmas period to avoid Christian connotations (see Christmas controversy)
- Winter Holiday (novel), a book in the Swallows and Amazons series by Arthur Ransome
- Winter Holidays (Vacanze d'inverno), a 1959 Italian film

== See also ==
- Holiday
- List of winter festivals
