= Coots in the North =

Unfinished novel

- First edition
- Author: Arthur Ransome
- Language: English
- Series: Swallows and Amazons
- Genre: Adventure, Children's Novels
- Publisher: Jonathan Cape
- Publication date: 1988
- Publication place: United Kingdom
- Media type: Print (Hardcover & Paperback)
- ISBN: 0-224-02605-4 (pb)
- OCLC: 18625905
- Preceded by: Great Northern?

Coots in the North is the name given by Arthur Ransome's biographer, Hugh Brogan, to an incomplete Swallows and Amazons novel found in Ransome's papers. Brogan edited and published the first few chapters as a fragment with a selection of Ransome's other short stories in 1988. The story starts in the Broads but continues in the Lake District after the Death and Glories hitch a ride aboard a boat being delivered to the Lake in the North.

== Plot summary ==
The Death and Glories are bored because the salvage business on the Broads is in decline. They see a boat being loaded for delivery to the lake in the North where the Swallows, Amazons and Ds have their adventures, and Joe (without consulting Bill or Pete) decides that they will go along for the ride. They get left behind at a stop near the lake, make their way to the lake, and find that the lorry has already left for Norfolk and they have no way to get home. They meet the owner of the boat who takes them to find the Ds. They encounter the Swallows, Amazons and Ds sailing on the lake and make an attempt to rescue Nancy after her boat capsizes.

At this point the story as published ends, though notes indicate that Ransome was struggling to develop a suitable plot line and a way of arranging for the Death and Glories to get home without their impoverished parents having to pay the fare. One possibility involved the salvage of Captain Flint's houseboat when its anchor chain breaks in a squall, and Captain Flint paying for their return journey in gratitude.

In 2009 a synopsis of a continuation of the story was published in Mixed Moss, the literary journal of the Arthur Ransome Society, entitled "Ship's Girl". In 2011 Mixed Moss held a competition for the best outline of a plot to complete the book, but a winner was never announced and as of 2026 the book remains uncompleted.

== Other stories ==
Coots in the North also includes two extracts that Hugh Brogan rescued from an unfinished Victorian Bevis-style novel, a fishing tale called "The River Comes First", plus several short stories that Arthur Ransome published in magazines:

"The Cloudburst"
"The Unofficial Side" is the only story he wrote involving the Russian Revolution. It is related by Hurst, a paid hand in a small private yacht.
"Two Shorts and a Long" also involves Hurst and is set on the yacht.
"The Shepherd’s Pipe" (previously unpublished) and "Ankou" are grim tales set among the peasants of Russia and Brittany (Ankou is the personification of Death in Brittany).

== Sources ==
- Coots in the North and Other Stories (Ed. Hugh Brogan, Jonathan Cape 1998, ISBN 0-224-02605-4).
