= We Didn't Mean to Go to Sea =

1937 children's book by Arthur Ransome

- Typical cover art depicting a montage of Arthur Ransome's own illustrations from the book
- Author: Arthur Ransome
- Cover artist: Arthur Ransome
- Language: English
- Series: Swallows and Amazons
- Genre: Children's books
- Publisher: Jonathan Cape
- Publication date: 1937
- Publication place: United Kingdom
- Media type: Print (Hardcover & Paperback)
- ISBN: 978-1-56792-487-9 (David R. Godine, Publisher: paperback, 1994)
- Preceded by: Pigeon Post
- Followed by: Secret Water

We Didn't Mean to Go to Sea is the seventh book in Arthur Ransome's Swallows and Amazons series of children's books. It was published in 1937. In this book, the Swallows (John, Susan, Titty and Roger Walker) are the only recurring characters. They are staying with their mother and little sister Bridget in a new location, Pin Mill on the River Orwell, upstream from the ports of Felixstowe and Harwich, and are in Suffolk to meet their father, Navy Commander Ted Walker, who is returning overland from a posting in Hong Kong (then a British possession) to take up a new posting at Shotley. (In Swallows and Amazons his ship was at Malta but under orders for Hong Kong, as also stated in Missee Lee.)

The book features a small sailing cutter, the Goblin, which is almost identical to Ransome's own boat Nancy Blackett. Ransome sailed Nancy Blackett across to Flushing (Vlissingen) by the same route as part of his research for the book. The navigational detail and the geography are both correct for the period when the story is set, unlike some of the other books in the series.

== Plot summary ==
The four eldest Walker children help Jim Brading, who has been given the sailing cutter Goblin by his uncle, make her fast when he misses his mooring buoy. In return he invites them to sail aboard Goblin. Their mother agrees, provided there is no night sailing, that they do not go outside the harbour, and that they are back the day after next. This last condition is imposed because of the imminent return of their father to England from a long naval posting overseas.

The children promise to abide by these conditions. However, on the second morning during a calm, the engine runs out of petrol; Jim had used it for some time the night before last. So, leaving the children aboard the anchored Goblin, Jim rows ashore in his dinghy, the Imp, to catch a bus to a garage in order to fill a petrol can. However he does not return, leaving the Goblin without her captain. An unexpected bank of fog then drifts over the river, and reduces visibility to zero. Some hours later, after hearing the anchor drag in the fog, the Walkers realise that the tide has risen, the anchor chain is now too short, and they are drifting downriver. While attempting to put out more chain, John loses the main anchor, tries to lower the spare (kedge) anchor but it fails, leaving the yacht drifting out beyond Beach End into the North Sea.

Aboard the drifting boat, John decides that it is safer to hoist the sails and go farther out to sea rather than stay near the shore among the sandbanks and shoals of the estuary, with the risk of being wrecked in the fog. A strengthening wind blows away the fog after a couple of hours, only for blinding rain to replace it. Susan is meanwhile wracked with guilt over the breaking of their promises and is also very seasick, while Titty has a bad headache and has to lie down. As darkness closes in, they attempt to put about to return to the river, but find that sailing against the now storm-force wind is impossible, so run eastward with the wind.

The Goblin sails east through the night in hazardous conditions. John has to leave Susan at the helm while he reefs the mainsail. He is almost swept overboard, but succeeds in his objective. They are then nearly run down by a ship as the navigation lights are out of paraffin. Titty improvises with a powerful torch and a red translucent plate. Meanwhile, at Pin Mill, Mrs Walker is wakened by the storm and is worried, although she tries to hide it from Bridget. At dawn next morning, as the wind is slackening, John persuades Susan to continue to the nearest port rather than trying to return to Harwich. They rescue a kitten, whom they name Sinbad, floating on a chicken coop. John then sights an unknown coast; they identify some fishing boats as Dutch, which means it is the Netherlands. Jim has warned them about longshore sharks who might claim salvage if asked for help. But they see a pilot boat, and pick up a Dutch pilot. As they do not want the pilot to know they are alone, John alone remains on deck, pretending to be a cabin boy ("a sort of Roger"), which fools the pilot long enough to help them enter the harbour.

They arrive safely in Flushing at the same time as their absent father is leaving on a ferry to Harwich. Their father leaves the ferry just in time and returns to help them deal with the pilot, who is so taken with their story that he forgoes his fee and helps them prepare for their return. Their father sends some carefully worded telegrams to Pin Mill, and as the children sleep, sails the Goblin back to England the following night. On arriving in Harwich harbour, the Goblin and its crew are reunited with Jim Brading, who is looking for his missing yacht. The absent skipper had been hit by a bus and had been unconscious in hospital for two days, suffering from concussion. They all sail up the river to be reunited with Mrs Walker and confess what had happened.

== Reception ==
A review in The Atlanta Constitution, thought the book would be appreciated by fans of the series. Helen Alice Howard, of the Lexington Herald-Leader, agreed with this, and added that despite the conceit—of blowing all the way across the ocean—the convincing writing of the author makes the reader accept it as a possibility. The Brooklyn Eagle's review believed it the work's "exciting adventure" would make it appeal to young readers, and also complimented the books "wholesomeness". Francis Broaddus Jr., writing in the El Paso Times, opined that the action was slightly faster than was normal for the series, which he thought would make the book more appealing for its target audience.
