= EPC Groupe =

Explosifs Produits Chimiques S.A.
- Trade name: EPC Groupe
- Industry: Explosives; Drilling
- Founded: 1893; 133 years ago
- Headquarters: Paris, France
- Subsidiaries: 50 subsidiaries in 20 countries
- Website: epc-groupe.com

EPC Groupe (Explosifs Produits Chimiques S.A.) is a French multinational company that trades in explosives and drilling; It is one of the world’s leaders in explosives manufacture, storage and distribution and in particular drilling and blasting.

== History ==
It was founded in 1893 by Eugène-Jean Barbier and its first implantation was in Saint-Martin-de-Crau (France). Eugène-Jean Barbier was one of the first to secure the rights to exploit Alfred Nobel’s patents for dynamite manufacturing.

EPC products were used in the mines of northern and southern France, but also in order to dig tunnels such as the Gotthard Tunnel between Switzerland and Italy.

The company aimed to be the european leader and take the place of Maxam by merging its activities with Société Suisse des Explosifs (SSE). The project was initiated on 24th February 2026 but the merger negotiations ended on 1st June 2026.

== Structure ==
It is headquartered in La Défense (France). It has over fifty subsidiary companies around the world.

=== United Kingdom ===
In the UK it has two sites, in Somercotes, Derbyshire and Great Oakley, Essex, known as EPC-UK. It began in the UK in 1905. The UK head office is south of the A38, at the B600 junction. It started in the UK as Explosives and Chemical Products (ECP), later part of Exchem. It has a 12,000 acre test site on the Essex coast at Hamford Water in Tendring. Exchem had a subsidiary in Essex, Thames Nitrogen, that made explosives.

== Products ==
It produces around 145,000 tonnes of explosive annually.
