= Swallows and Amazons series =

English children's book series

Swallows and Amazons
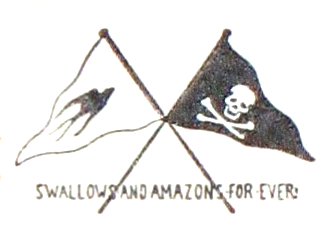
- Detail from Missee Lee cover
- Swallows and Amazons (1930); Swallowdale (1931); Peter Duck (1932); Winter Holiday (1933); Coot Club (1934); Pigeon Post (1936); We Didn't Mean to Go to Sea (1937); Secret Water (1939); The Big Six (1940); Missee Lee (1941); The Picts and the Martyrs (1943); Great Northern? (1947); Coots in the North (1988)
- Author: Arthur Ransome
- Illustrator: Steven Spurrier; Clifford Webb
- Country: United Kingdom
- Language: English
- Genre: Children's literature, Adventure fiction
- Publisher: Jonathan Cape
- Published: 1930–1988
- Media type: Print (hardcover and paperback)
- No. of books: 12

The Swallows and Amazons series is a series of twelve children's adventure novels by English author Arthur Ransome. Set in the interwar period, the novels involve group adventures by children, mainly in the school holidays and mainly in England. They revolve around outdoor activities, especially sailing. Literary critic Peter Hunt believes the series "changed British literature, affected a whole generation's view of holidays, helped to create the national image of the English Lake District and added Arthur Ransome's name to the select list of classic British children's authors." The series remains popular and inspires visits to the Lake District and Norfolk Broads, where many of the books are set.

There are several societies for studying and promoting Ransome's work, particularly the Swallows and Amazons series. The earliest was the Arthur Ransome Club in Japan. The British-based Arthur Ransome Society has an international membership.

== Overview ==
The series begins with Swallows and Amazons, published in 1930. The Walker children, staying at a lakeside farm in the school holidays, sail a dinghy named Swallow, while the local Blackett girls, living on the opposite shore, have one named Amazon. The Walkers see themselves as explorers, whereas the Blacketts declare themselves pirates. They clash on an island in the lake, make friends, and have a series of adventures that weave tales of pirates and exploration into everyday life in rural England. In subsequent adventures, the children change roles and become explorers or miners. Winter Holiday (1933) introduces Dick and Dorothea Callum ("the Ds"), siblings of a similar age also visiting the area. Dick aspires to be a scientist, Dorothea a writer.

Two of the books feature the Callums without the Swallows or Amazons: Coot Club and The Big Six. They are set in the accurately drawn Norfolk Broads, notably the small village of Horning and its watery surroundings. Two other books are set in Suffolk and Essex around the River Orwell; one involves an involuntary trip across the North Sea to the Netherlands. Peter Duck and Missee Lee are metafictional: fictional stories of the protagonists' voyages to exotic lands, as imagined and written by themselves.

== Major characters ==
The crew of the Swallow are the siblings John, Susan, Titty and Roger Walker. John, the eldest, is the captain. Susan is first mate, in charge of stores, cooking and general crew well-being. Titty (a nickname derived from the fairy tale "Titty Mouse and Tatty Mouse" in Joseph Jacobs's Old English Fairy Tales published in 1890) is "able seaman". She often conjures up her own adventures, while becoming a hero in the novels, for instance, by winning the "war" in Swallows and Amazons or finding an underground spring in Pigeon Post. Roger is the youngest, originally the ship's boy, but later promoted to able seaman. Their youngest sister Bridget (originally nicknamed "Vicky" due to a resemblance to pictures of Queen Victoria in old age; the nickname is dropped in later books as she loses her resemblance) also joins the crew in Secret Water. Roger is seven in the first novel and Bridget has her second birthday.

The crew of the Amazon are the sisters Nancy and Peggy Blackett. Nancy – who disdains her baptismal name Ruth because her uncle said that pirates are supposed to be ruthless – is a strong tomboyish character. Her speech includes many nautical and pirate terms. She often leads both crews. Peggy (real name Margaret) puts up a show of being as tough as Nancy, but often needs her encouragement to get through the more dangerous adventures. She is afraid of thunderstorms.

The siblings Dick and Dorothea (Dot) Callum are introduced in the fourth book, Winter Holiday. They are the intellectuals – Dick in matters of science, Dorothea in the arts. The Callums later acquire a dinghy of their own, the Scarab. The Swallows initially wonder about Dot: "an astronomer might be quite useful... but what's she going to do"? (Dot overhears this.) However, they are impressed by both children's skating: "He can skate ... like anything".

The Callums are the link to a different location and set of characters after their appearance in Winter Holiday. Coot Club and The Big Six are both set in the Norfolk Broads, where they meet the Coot Club members: Tom Dudgeon; the twins, Port and Starboard; and Bill, Joe and Pete, three sons of boatbuilders and known as the Death and Glories.

With some exceptions, the exact ages of the characters are not stated. In the first book they run from Roger at seven to about 12 to 14 (John and Nancy). All characters age as the series goes on; the final book occurs three to four years after the first. (See timeline below.) There is an inconsistency in the only two dates mentioned in the series. In the first the year is stated to be 1929, while the second book, Swallowdale, supposed to take place a year later, gives the year as 1931. A second inconsistency is that while Bridget is only about two years old in the first novel, she has aged more than four years by the time of Secret Water.

While the emphasis in all the books is on the young protagonists, many generally benevolent adults appear. Most prominent are the Blackett sisters' uncle Jim Turner, called Captain Flint by the children after a character in Treasure Island, and Mrs Barrable in Coot Club. Mrs Walker and Mrs Blackett occasionally appear. A painfully shy geologist, Timothy Stedding, is also accepted by the children in Pigeon Post and included in their adventures. He reappears in The Picts and the Martyrs.

== Settings ==
The Swallows and Amazons series has strong links with the real world. Extensive elements in the characters and the settings can be traced to incidents in Ransome's life and are raw material for much discussion and theorising about precise relationships. This contributes strongly to the air of authenticity.

The first book, Swallows and Amazons, and four sequels — Swallowdale, Winter Holiday, Pigeon Post and The Picts and the Martyrs — are set in and around an unnamed lake in the English Lake District. Most of the unfinished Coots in the North would also have been set on the lake, if Ransome had completed it before his death. The lake and surrounding fells amalgamate Windermere and Coniston Water, places where Ransome spent much of his childhood and later life. Many places in the books can be identified with real locations. The geography of the lake generally resembles Windermere (though Wild Cat Island has a number of elements from Peel Island in Coniston Water) while the fells and surrounding hills resemble the Coniston area more closely.

Coot Club and The Big Six are set in the accurately represented Norfolk Broads, particularly the small village of Horning and its surrounding rivers and broads. Coots in the North also begins in the Broads before moving to the lake in the north.

We Didn't Mean to Go to Sea and Secret Water are set in coastal Suffolk and Essex, with the former involving an involuntary, sometimes terrifying voyage from Pin Mill on the River Orwell to Flushing in the Netherlands, and the latter the exploration of the islands of Hamford Water near Walton-on-the-Naze.

Peter Duck and Missee Lee involve voyages of the schooner Wild Cat to the Caribbean and the South China Sea. These stories appear to be metafictional in relation to the rest of the series, and were originally planned by Ransome (see below) as stories written by the children. The final published works, however, are presented simply as adventures in the series, though different in a number of ways. Most obvious is the inclusion of more fear and violence and the fact that the extended voyages would have taken the children from school for unacceptably long periods. Both books are described on their title pages as "based on information supplied by the Swallows and Amazons", a description which is absent from the rest of the series.

Two abandoned chapters of Peter Duck (called Their Own Story) were found in Ransome's papers held in the Brotherton Library at the University of Leeds. They describe the story of Peter Duck being made up by the Walkers and Blacketts on a wherry in the Norfolk Broads during the winter after the events described in Swallows and Amazons. This event was later referenced in Swallowdale, but not in Peter Duck itself.

The final complete book, Great Northern?, is set in the Outer Hebrides off the west coast of Scotland. It is sometimes included with Peter Duck and Missee Lee as metafictional, as the story would involve the children being away from school during the nesting season, which is in term time. Furthermore, the use of firearms, though reasonable within the plot, seems to be at odds with the more peaceable adventures in most of the rest of the series. Myles North, the ornithologist who had originally suggested the plot to Ransome as the basis for a new novel, had initially proposed this, with the Wild Cat voyage again providing the background. Ransome, however, wrote in reply that he wanted to maintain the clear distinction between the "romantic stories and the real ones", and that he had decided upon a "realistic treatment" for Great Northern?.

== Timeline ==
The following diagram shows the implied timeline of the books in the series. The initials indicate an acronym for the title of each book, e.g. SA is Swallows and Amazons; PD is Peter Duck, and so on.

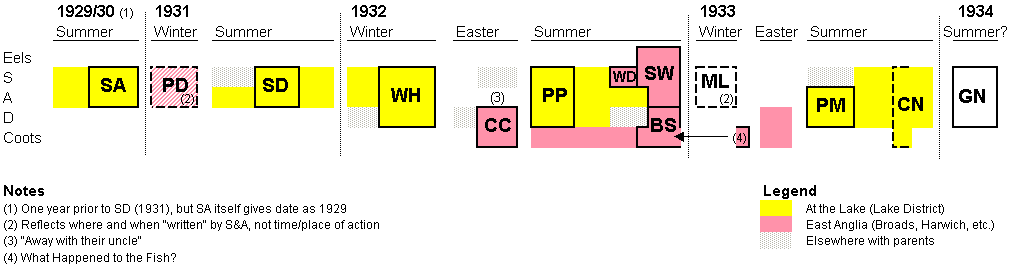
Click to expand the timeline

== Illustrations ==
Current editions of the Swallows and Amazons series have illustrations drawn by Ransome himself. The first edition of Swallows and Amazons was published almost without illustrations. Ransome so disliked the pictures by Steven Spurrier that were commissioned by his publisher, Jonathan Cape, that the only pictures in the first edition were the endpaper map of the lake and a map of Wild Cat Island. For the second edition, Clifford Webb was commissioned to produce the illustrations, which met with grudging approval from Ransome. Webb also illustrated Swallowdale, but Ransome decided that he would personally illustrate the third book, Peter Duck. As this book was supposedly based on information supplied by the children themselves, Ransome drew the pictures as though done by the characters. These illustrations were so popular that Ransome illustrated the remainder of his books himself. In 1938, he drew his own pictures for Swallows and Amazons and Swallowdale to replace Webb's.

Ransome's pictures were done in pen and ink with no colour, although colours have been added by some publishers in later editions. Typically, figures in the pictures are shown from behind, though some show the faces of a few of the characters. Taqui Altounyan, the oldest of the children to whom the first edition of Swallows and Amazons was dedicated, recalls that Ransome "shirked drawing faces and got over the difficulty with back views of shaggy heads of hair or hats."

== Reception ==
The sixth book, Pigeon Post, won the inaugural Carnegie Medal from the Library Association in June 1937, recognising it as the best 1936 children's book by a British subject. It was reviewed in The New York Times the month after J. B. Lippincott & Co. of Philadelphia published the first U.S. edition. Ellen Lewis Buell welcomed the latest work in the six-year-old series that had firmly established "a special niche in juvenile literature". She noted the children's "vivid collective imagination which turned play into serious business" (hunting a gold mine on the moors) and observed, "It is the portrayal of this spirit which makes play a matter of desperate yet enjoyable earnestness which gives their distinctive stamp to Mr. Ransome's books.... Because he understands the whole-heartedness of youth he can invest a momentary experiment, such as young Roger's Indian scout work, with real suspense."

Critical remarks have been rare. Roald Dahl disliked the series, explaining that he found the characters "too soft". The children's writer Elinor Lyon, in an autobiographical introduction to a reprint of the first book in her series about a pair of adventurous young siblings on the west coast of Scotland, remembers feeling a "dislike of the characters in Swallows and Amazons who are so good at things like sailing. I thought I'd have children who got things wrong but somehow survived."

== Series ==
1. Swallows and Amazons (published 1930)
2. Swallowdale (1931)
3. Peter Duck (1932)
4. Winter Holiday (1933)
5. Coot Club (1934)
6. Pigeon Post (1936)
7. We Didn't Mean to Go to Sea (1937)
8. Secret Water (1939)
9. The Big Six (1940)
10. Missee Lee (1941)
11. The Picts and the Martyrs: or Not Welcome At All (1943)
12. Great Northern? (1947)
13. Coots in the North (unfinished at author's 1967 death, edited by Hugh Brogan, sections published thus in 1988 with other short works)

== Adaptations ==
In 1963, the BBC screened a television series starring Susan George as "Kitty" (changed from Titty to Ransome's strong distaste). The six-part series was aired in September–October 1963.

In 1974, EMI produced a film version of the Swallows and Amazons, starring Virginia McKenna and Ronald Fraser.

In 1984, the BBC adapted the two Norfolk-set stories, Coot Club and The Big Six, for television, entitled Swallows and Amazons Forever!

In 2010, a stage musical version of the first book in the series was created at Bristol Old Vic, adapted by Helen Edmundson with music by Neil Hannon, and directed by Tom Morris. The show was toured, including a stint in London's West End.

A film version of Swallows and Amazons by Harbour Pictures and BBC Films was released in the United Kingdom on 19 August 2016. This film changes the Titty′s name 'Tatty' in keeping with original fairy-tale nicknames.

In 2018 a stage adaptation of the series by Bryony Lavery opened at Storyhouse, Chester.
