= The Picts and the Martyrs =

1943 children's book by Arthur Ransome

- First edition
- Author: Arthur Ransome
- Cover artist: Arthur Ransome
- Language: English
- Series: Swallows and Amazons
- Genre: Children's books
- Publisher: Jonathan Cape
- Publication date: 1943
- Publication place: United Kingdom
- Media type: Print (Hardcover & Paperback)
- ISBN: 978-1-56792-430-5 (David R. Godine, Publisher: paperback, 2010)
- Preceded by: Missee Lee
- Followed by: Great Northern?

The Picts and the Martyrs is the eleventh book in Arthur Ransome's Swallows and Amazons series of children's books. It was published in 1943. This is the last completed book set in the Lake District and features the Blackett sisters (the Amazons) and the Callum siblings, Dick and Dorothea. Ransome's most "native" character, the Great Aunt, also features prominently, as do many aspects of Lakeland life. The Dog's Home is based on a small stone hut built in the woods above Coniston Water close to Ransome's then residence Lowick Hall.

== Characters ==
- Dick and Dorothea Callum (the Picts)
- The Amazons: Nancy and Peggy Blackett
- The Great Aunt (Maria Turner)
- Jacky Warriner, a local lad
- Sammy Lewthwaite, the policeman
- Billy Lewthwaite, the gardener (Sammy's brother)
- Cook - cook in the Blackett household, named as "M. Braithwaite"
- Timothy Stedding - known as "Squashy Hat" in Pigeon Post

== Plot summary ==
The Callum children have been invited to stay at the Blacketts' house, Beckfoot, at the start of the summer holidays while Mrs Blackett has gone with her brother, James Turner (whom they call Captain Flint), on a cruise for her health. However, when bossy Great Aunt Maria finds out that the Blackett girls have been left at home, supposedly unsupervised, she decides to come and take care of them. She is unaware of the Callums' visit.

Nancy Blackett insists that their guests' holiday will not be spoiled and that they will learn to sail the Scarab, a dinghy their father has bought for them. So they move out to the Dog's Home, a small hut in the woods, and become secretive Picts while the Blacketts are martyrs to the Great Aunt. The Picts are schooled in woodcraft by Jacky, a local boy who brings them a rabbit to skin, gut and cook, and teaches them how to tickle trout. In the woods, Dick's ornithology comes to the fore. True to her character, Dorothea constantly romanticises their situation.

The Great Aunt attempts to civilise the Amazon pirates, for example by making them read aloud, recite poetry and perform their party-pieces on the piano. Despite these ordeals, they manage to accomplish a number of adventures. They succeed in escaping for a day to accompany Captain Flint's partner Timothy to the copper mine previously discovered in Pigeon Post.

Dick succeeds in burgling Captain Flint's study at Beckfoot to commandeer some chemical equipment that Timothy needs to assay ore samples from the mine. They are also introduced to sailing the Scarab. The Great Aunt starts to suspect that the Amazons are meeting the Swallows. Near the end of her visit, the Great Aunt goes missing and there is a massive search for her. She has gone to make her own enquiries after the suspected Swallows, but is forced to admit that she has been quite wrong. The Callums find her on Captain Flint's houseboat, which is messy with Timothy's ore samples. Despite being the very people who must not meet her, they deliver her back to Beckfoot in their boat in time to catch her train, and manage to avoid revealing their identities. They slip away before they can be questioned, and Nancy manages to save the Great Aunt some embarrassment, for which she gets praised in a letter to her mother.

== The writing of The Picts and the Martyrs ==
Ransome's wife “Genia” (Evgenia) hated the book while it was being written, but his mother Edith persuaded him to publish it. Genia was often discouraging about his books while he was writing them.
