= The Big Six =

1940 children's book by Arthur Ransome

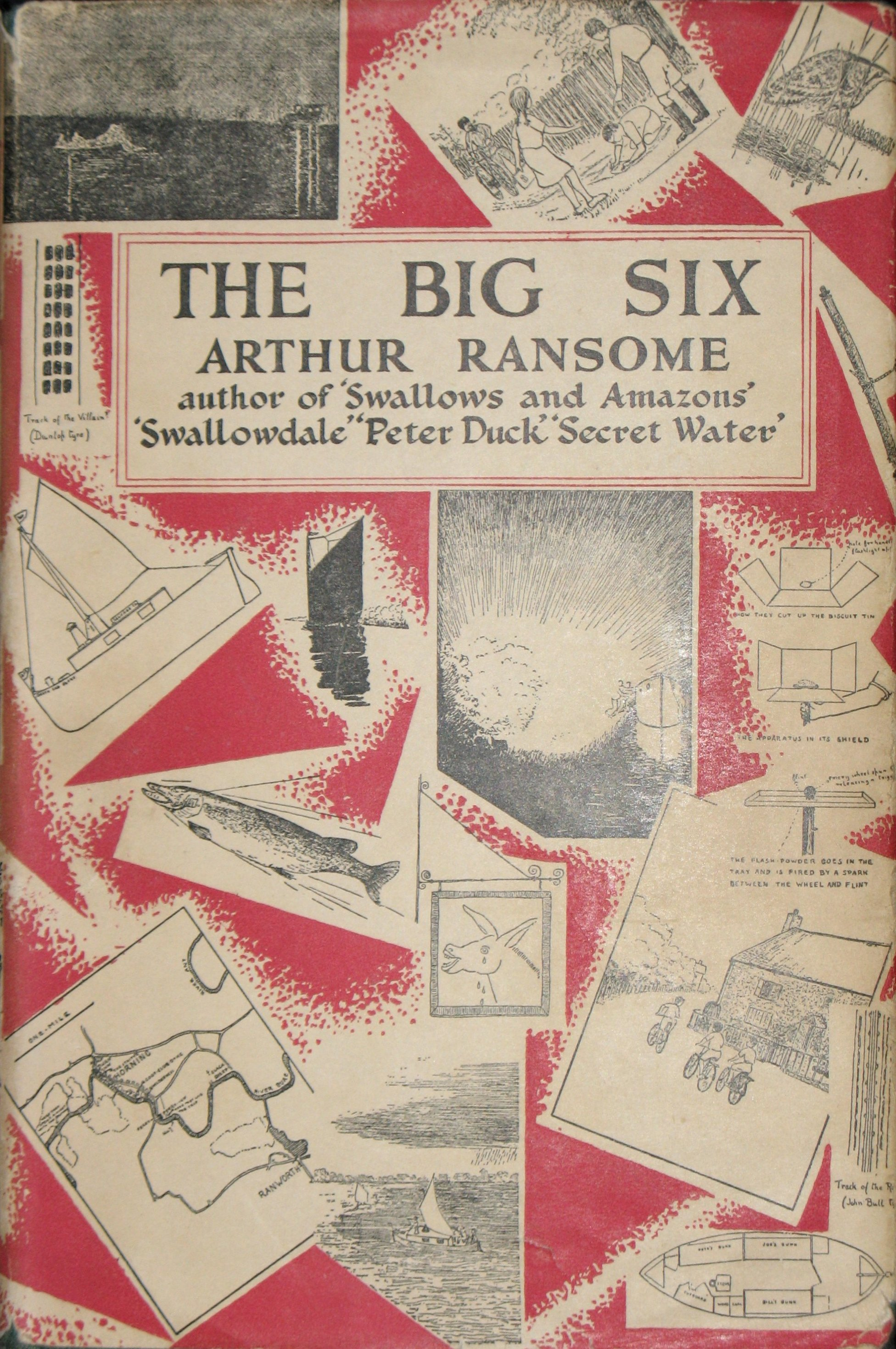
- Author: Arthur Ransome
- Cover artist: Arthur Ransome
- Language: English
- Series: Swallows and Amazons
- Genre: Children's novels
- Publisher: Jonathan Cape
- Publication date: 1940
- Publication place: United Kingdom
- Media type: Print (Hardcover & Paperback)
- Pages: 368
- ISBN: 978-1-56792-119-9 (David R. Godine, Publisher: paperback, 2000)
- OCLC: 9647950
- Preceded by: Secret Water
- Followed by: Missee Lee

The Big Six is the ninth book of Arthur Ransome's Swallows and Amazons series of children's books, published in 1940. The book returns Dick and Dorothea Callum, known as the Ds, to the Norfolk Broads where they renew their friendship with the members of the Coot Club. This book is more of a detective story as the Ds and Coot Club try to unravel a mystery that threatens the Death and Glories' freedom to sail the river. Dorothea names the group of amateur detectives "The Big Six", an allusion to the "Big Five" group of murder detectives at Scotland Yard.

== Plot summary ==
The Ds return to Norfolk, hoping to enjoy a holiday with their friends of the Coot Club. Unfortunately, they find the Death and Glories (Pete, Bill and Joe) coming under a gathering cloud of suspicion of setting moored boats adrift.

Everywhere they go, boats seem to be cast adrift; and they are threatened with being forbidden to sail, for fear of their fathers being disgraced and possibly losing their jobs. Things get worse when new shackles are stolen from a boatbuilder after one of the casting off episodes and some of them are found aboard the Death and Glory. At the same time, the boys seem to be flush with cash, but they won't say where they got it. However, their silence is not from fear or guilt, and their funds had not come from fencing stolen property or committing any other crimes; rather, they had accepted a tow from the Cachalot, owned by a keen pike fisherman, and by chance and courage had hooked a colossal pike while the owner was at the local pub. The fisherman swore them to silence about this exploit, but, being an honourable man, had given them the money that the landlord of the pub had promised him for the fish, since he himself had done nothing towards landing the fish.

The Big Six (Dick, Dorothea, Tom Dudgeon, and the three Death and Glories) get together to investigate the crimes and collect evidence. Dorothea is the intellectual of the party and Dick's camera comes to the fore. The opposition consists of the local policeman, PC Tedder, and a group of local vigilantes, among whom is George Owdon, a villain from the earlier book, Coot Club, who consequently has a grudge to work off. Eventually, with the help of the owner of the Cachalot, a carefully prepared trap is sprung and in a flash (literally, to take a night photo of the real culprits) the villains are discovered and the boys are exonerated. The penitent constable Tedder makes a humble and heart-felt apology to the children for having naively believed the word of the culprits over their own protests of innocence, and promises to never distrust them again. The source of their secret supply of money is uncovered when the local pub unveils the magnificent pike, now stuffed and mounted.

The book shows a distinct contrast between the Death & Glories, who are boys of artisan background, and the others. The Death & Glories are all sons of skilled workmen in the local boatyards. The Ds, however, are the children of university dons. Their intelligence attracts admiration, but in all practical matters they need helping out. Nevertheless, each group admires the qualities of the other. Tom Dudgeon, as the son of the local GP, occupies an intermediate station. He respects academic discipline, but when a Norfolk wherry needs saving from wreck, he is the one who knows what to do, and even his own father acknowledges it.

== Film, TV or theatrical adaptations ==
BBC produced a television series Swallows and Amazons Forever! based on Coot Club and The Big Six in 1984.
