= Hamford Water =

Tidal inlet in Essex, England

Coordinates: 51.88°N 1.24°E

- Site of Special Scientific Interest
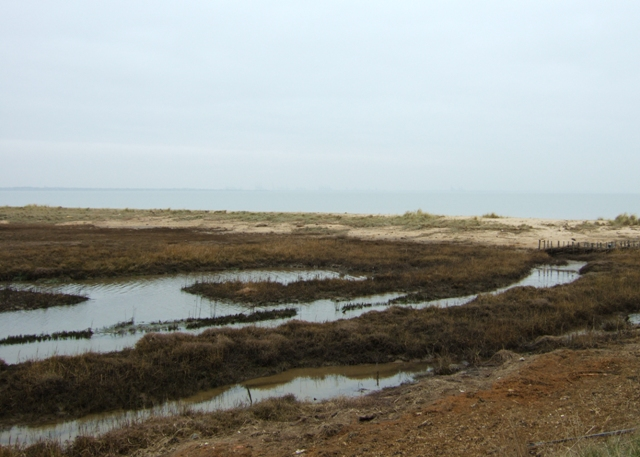
- Location of Hamford Water.
- Area of search: Essex
- Grid reference: TM 235255
- Interest: Biological
- Area: 2,185.8 hectares (5,401 acres)
- Notification date: 1986
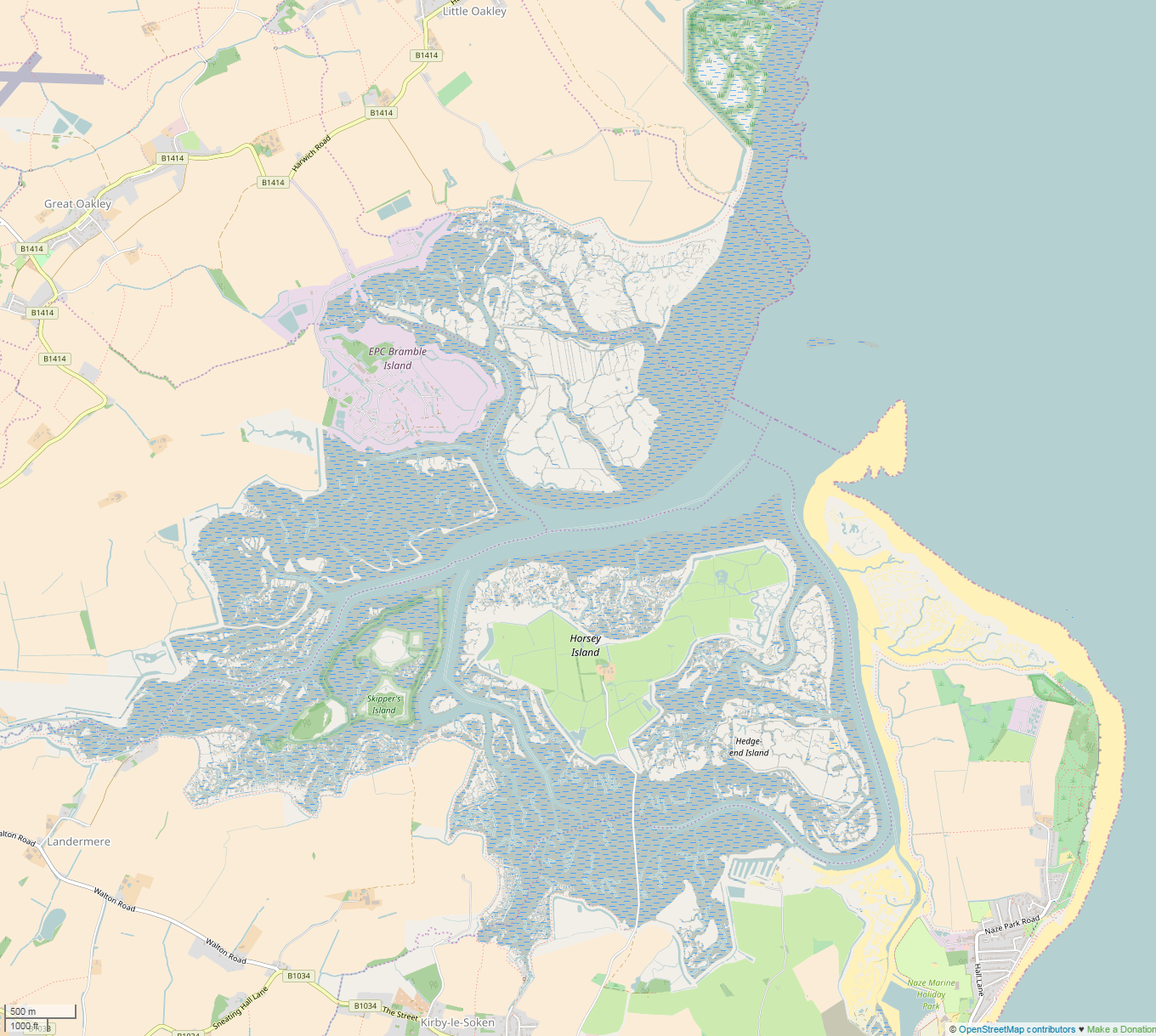
- Location map

Designations

Ramsar Wetland
- Official name: Hamford Water
- Designated: 8 June 1993
- Reference no.: 607

Hamford Water is a 2,185.8-hectare (5,401-acre) biological Site of Special Scientific Interest between Walton-on-the-Naze and Harwich in Essex. The site is a tidal inlet which has marsh grasslands, creeks, mud and sand flats, salt marshes, islands and beaches. It is described by Natural England as "of international importance for breeding little terns and wintering dark-bellied brent geese, wildfowl and waders, and of national importance for many other bird species." Rare plants include hog's fennel and slender hare's-ear. The main invertebrates are worms and thin-shelled molluscs. The largest island, Horsey Island, can be reached on foot at low tide across The Wade from Kirby-le-Soken.

It is also a Ramsar site, a Special Protection Area, a Nature Conservation Review site, and most of it is a National Nature Reserve. Two small areas, Skippers Island and John Weston Nature Reserve, are managed by the Essex Wildlife Trust.

Hanford Water was used as the basis for Arthur Ransome's novel Secret Water.

As of 2017, most of Bramble Island (on the North side of the area, now part of the mainland) was used by Exchem for explosives testing. In previous years it had been the site of an explosives factory, which saw fatal incidents occur in 1913, 1928, 1942, 1950, and 1956.

== See also ==
- Beaumont Cut
