= Missee Lee =

1941 children's book by Arthur Ransome

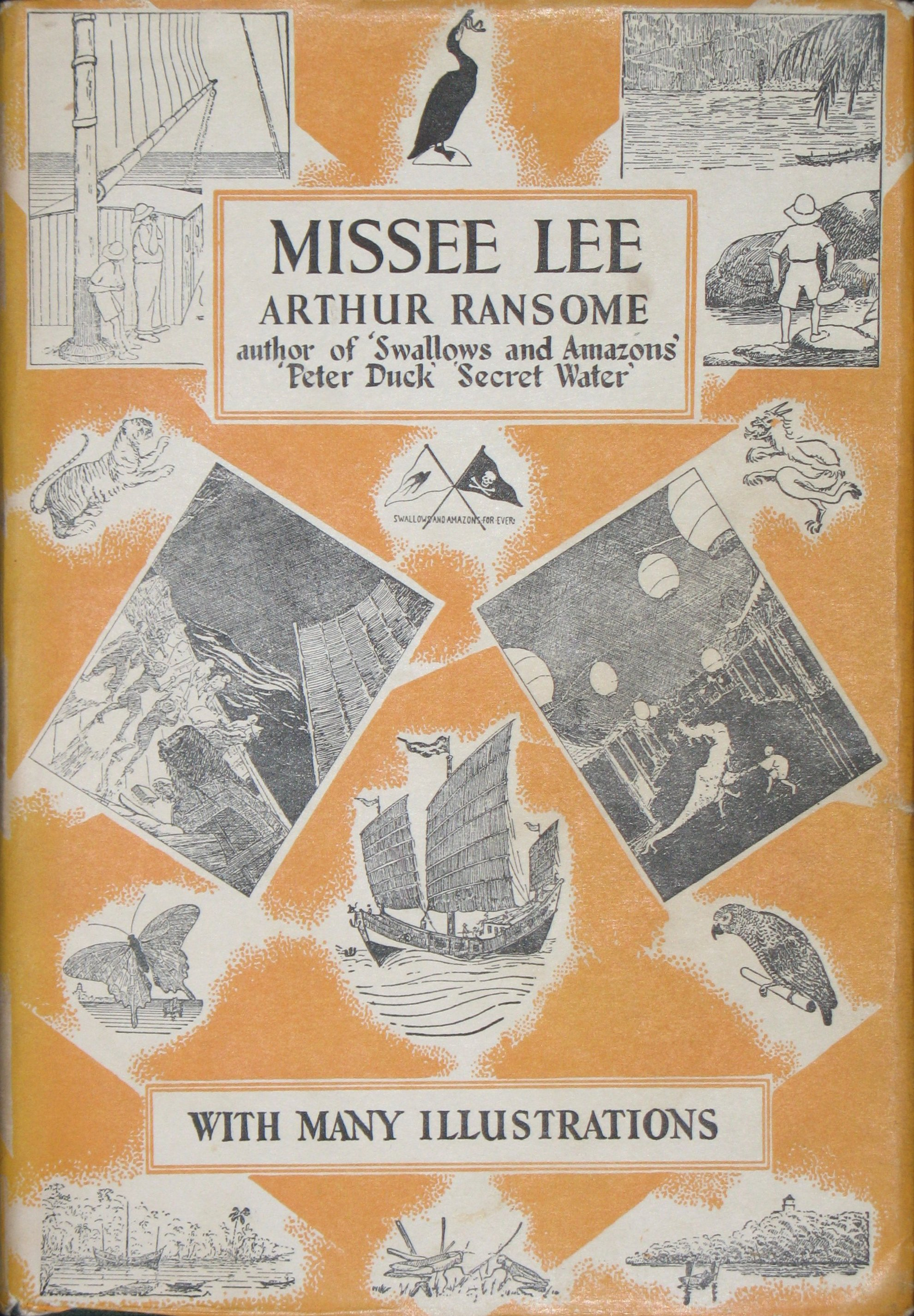
- photograph of Jonathan Cape edition of Arthur Ransome's 1941 novel, Missee Lee
- Author: Arthur Ransome
- Cover artist: Arthur Ransome
- Language: English
- Series: Swallows and Amazons
- Genre: Children's novels
- Publisher: Jonathan Cape
- Publication date: 1941
- Publication place: United Kingdom
- Media type: Print (Hardcover & Paperback)
- ISBN: 1-56792-196-5 (David R. Godine, Publisher: paperback, 2001)
- OCLC: 48144509
- LC Class: PZ7.R175 Mi 2001
- Preceded by: The Big Six
- Followed by: The Picts And The Martyrs

Missee Lee is the tenth book of Arthur Ransome's Swallows and Amazons series of children's books, set in 1930s China. The Swallows and Amazons are on a round-the-world trip with Captain Flint aboard the schooner Wild Cat. After the Wild Cat sinks, they escape in the boats Swallow and Amazon, but are separated in a storm. Both dinghies eventually end up in the lair of the Three Island pirates—Chang, Woo and Lee—where they are held prisoner by the unusual Missee Lee, the leader of the Three Island pirates.

The book, published in 1941, is considered one of the metafictional books in the series, along with Peter Duck and perhaps Great Northern?

== Sources ==
Ransome visited China in 1926 and 1927, where he learned about Chinese life and culture. He also met, amongst others Soong Ching-ling, the wife of Sun Yat-sen. Ransome said that he based many of Missee Lee's characteristics on her, though there were others who contributed to the character.

== Plot summary ==
The book opens with the Swallows, Amazons and Captain Flint in an unnamed port in the South China Sea, apparently the Hundredth Port of a round-the-world voyage aboard the Wild Cat, the small green schooner featured in Peter Duck. They are warned to stay away from the Chinese coast because of pirates.

On the next stage of their voyage, they encounter a dead calm. Their monkey, Gibber, causes a fire, which burns the Wild Cat to the waterline, causing her to sink. They all escape aboard the Swallow and Amazon, which are being used as ship's boats. However, the boats are separated in the night when a strong wind blows up. The crew of the Amazon, the Blackett sisters and their uncle, is picked up by a junk, which turns out to be a pirate vessel. The Swallows make their own way to shore, where they eventually meet the Amazons, who are being held by Taicoon Chang, one of the Taicoons who rule the Three Islands. Captain Flint is kept under much stricter guard by the Taicoon, who hopes to ransom him, as he claims to be the Lord Mayor of San Francisco.

The children are sent to Missee Lee, the leader of the pirates. She turns out to be a frustrated academic from Cambridge, who had been sent to England for her education, only to have to return to rule the Three Islands when her father died. She starts to give the children Latin lessons, at which Roger surprisingly excels. Captain Flint is also bought from Taicoon Chang who has threatened to chop off his head. The pirates are concerned that if the Royal Navy were to learn their position, a gunboat might be sent to destroy them, so when Captain Flint is later seen by the other Taicoon, Wu, with a sextant, they are only saved from having their heads chopped off by Missee Lee's intervention.

As they consider that they are still in danger of execution and are also becoming fed up with the Latin lessons, they plan an escape. During the Dragon festival, they set sail aboard Missee Lee's junk, the Shining Moon. With the help of Missee Lee, who has decided to leave her responsibilities on the Three Islands and go back to study at Cambridge, they take a daring and dangerous passage through a gorge to evade capture. However, when Missee Lee hears fighting begin between the various islanders, she decides that she owes it to her father and her people to return and unite them again. The Swallows, Amazons and Captain Flint return to England aboard the Shining Moon.
