= Swallows and Amazons Forever! =

British television series

- Title Card
- Genre: Children's
- Based on: Swallows and Amazons series by Arthur Ransome
- Screenplay by: Michael Robson
- Directed by: Andrew Morgan
- Country of origin: United Kingdom
- Original language: English
- No. of seasons: 1
- No. of episodes: 8

Production
- Production location: Norfolk Broads

Original release
- Network: BBC Two
- Release: 14 March – 2 May 1984

Swallows and Amazons Forever! is a 1984 BBC children's television series based on two children's novels from the Swallows and Amazons series by Arthur Ransome: Coot Club (1934) (four episodes), and The Big Six (1940) (four episodes). Despite the title, the Swallows and the Amazons children from Ransome's other books do not appear.

The setting is the Norfolk Broads in the 1930s, partly near the village of Horning. The main characters are visitors Dick and Dorothea (Dot) Callum and locals Tom Dudgeon, the twins Nell and Bess, three boatbuilders’ sons, Joe, Bill and Pete – the Death and Glories – and adults Mrs Barrable, Dr Dudgeon (father of Tom) and Frank Farland (father of the twins).

Coot Club sees Dick and Dot learning to sail, whilst dealing with five obnoxious adults in the Margoletta motor cruiser, who are called the Hullabaloos by the children. The Big Six is a detective story in which the Death and Glories are accused of setting boats adrift.

A Puffin paperback with the same title was published in 1983; it is a condensation of Coot Club (omitting the postscript) and The Big Six (omitting 7 chapters). It was reissued as a Red Fox paperback in 1993 with the title Swallows and Amazons for Ever!

It was intended that Swallows and Amazons Forever! should have continued with adaptions of all the books in the series, and Swallowdale and The Picts and the Martyrs were to have been next. Casting and scouting for locations began, but the cost of filming on National Trust property in the Lake District was too expensive, so the series was cancelled.

== Episodes ==
The series was first broadcast on BBC Two on Wednesdays in 1984.
It was repeated as two compilations on Friday 28 March and Sunday 30 March 1986.

Episode	Date	Time
Coot Club - Episode 1	Wednesday 14 March 1984	7.10–7.35 pm
Coot Club - Episode 2	Wednesday 21 March 1984	7.10–7.35 pm
Coot Club - Episode 3	Wednesday 28 March 1984	7.10–7.35 pm
Coot Club - Episode 4	Wednesday 4 April 1984	7.00–7.25 pm
The Big Six - Episode 1	Wednesday 11 April 1984	7.05–7.30 pm
The Big Six - Episode 2	Wednesday 18 April 1984	7.15–7.40 pm
The Big Six - Episode 3	Wednesday 25 April 1984	7.15–7.40 pm
The Big Six - Episode 4	Wednesday 2 May 1984	7.10–7.35 pm

== Characters ==
Richard Walton as Dick Callum
Caroline Downer as Dorothea Callum
Henry Dimbleby as Tom Dudgeon
Claire Matthews as Bess Farland (nicknamed "Port" due to her being left-handed)
Sarah Matthews as Nell Farland (nicknamed "Starboard" due to her being right-handed)
Nicholas Walpole as Joe
Mark Page as Bill
Jake Coppard as Pete
Rosemary Leach as Mrs Barrable
John Woodvine as Mr Tedder, the policeman
Colin Baker as Dr Dudgeon
Andrew Burt as Frank Farland
Simon Hawes as George Owden

Some minor characters

Julian Fellowes as Jerry, a Hullabaloo
Patrick Troughton as Harry Bangate, the Eel Man
Sam Kelly as the owner of the Cachalot
