= Swallows and Amazons (2016 film) =

2016 British film by Philippa Lowthorpe

- British release poster
- Directed by: Philippa Lowthorpe
- Written by: Andrea Gibb
- Based on: Swallows and Amazons by Arthur Ransome
- Produced by: Nick Barton; Nick O'Hagan; Joe Oppenheimer
- Starring: Rafe Spall; Andrew Scott; Kelly Macdonald
- Cinematography: Julian Court
- Edited by: Dave Thrasher
- Music by: Ilan Eshkeri
- Production companies: Harbour Pictures; BBC Films; British Film Institute; HanWay Films
- Distributed by: StudioCanal
- Release date: 19 August 2016 (United Kingdom)
- Running time: 96 minutes
- Country: United Kingdom
- Language: English
- Box office: $3.9 million (UK)

Swallows and Amazons is a 2016 British family adventure film directed by Philippa Lowthorpe and written by Andrea Gibb, based on Arthur Ransome's 1930 children's novel of the same name. The film stars Andrew Scott, Rafe Spall, Kelly Macdonald, Jessica Hynes, and Harry Enfield. Principal photography began on 21 June 2015 in the Lake District. The film, which was released on 19 August 2016, is the third audiovisual adaption of the novel; the first being a 6-part BBC TV series in 1963 and the second a 1974 film version.

== Plot ==
Sometime in the 1930s, with their father away, the four Walker children, John (about 15), Susan (about 12), Tatty (9 1/2) and Roger (about 7), along with their mother and baby sister, leave by train to the Lake District. On the train, they encounter a rude man who is being chased by two suspicious men.

In the Lake District, the family stay at the farm of Mr and Mrs Jackson. The farm is on Lake Windermere. While skipping stones, John breaks the window of a houseboat moored on the lake. Although the children run away, the rude man emerges from the boat and sees them. Unknown to them, the two suspicious men, who have learned that the man they are looking for is named Jim Turner, also see Turner on the houseboat. Turner visits the Jackson farm to complain to Mrs Walker about the damage caused by the stone thrown by John.

Having seen a distant island, the children wish to sail there and camp. Mr Jackson offers his sailing boat, named Swallow. John is captain of Swallow, Susan is master's mate, Tatty is able seaman and keeper of the ship’s log, and Roger is ship’s boy and lookout. They bring tents and food prepared by their mother and Mrs Jackson. Due to some bad steering, the basket with the food is lost overboard. The children make it to the island, which Tatty names “Walker Island”.

The two suspicious men observe Turner on his houseboat that night. The taller suspicious man, Zukin, suggests killing Turner, but his colleague, Lazlov, replies in Russian that they need to bring Turner in alive, as well as find papers which are hidden on the boat.

The next morning, while Susan and Roger are still sleeping, John and Tatty meet two charcoal burners on the mainland. One, Old Billy, asks John to inform the houseboat owner, whom Tatty calls Captain Flint, but Old Billy knows as Jim Turner, that two strangers have been asking questions about him.

Meanwhile, Susan and Roger discover a campsite on the island with a skull and crossbones and warning, signed “The Amazons”. They see a boat near the island flying a Jolly Roger named Amazon with two children on board. Susan realizes they must be the Amazons.

John and Tatty sail to Houseboat Bay to pass on Old Billy’s news. While inside the cabin, John sees files and photographs of planes, warships and naval guns. Turner returns and confronts John, calling him a liar and a spy. John says he only came to give Turner a message, but Turner does not want to hear anything John has to say. After John leaves, Turner packs and locks a small trunk.

While John and Tatty are sailing away, the Amazons fire a flare across Swallow’s bow. John sails back to the island to get the full crew. Swallow sails after Amazon, but Amazon, revealed to be crewed by two girls, is faster, and gets away.

The children sail to “Rio”, a local town, to get food. Roger stays with the boat if he can hold John’s pocketknife. Turner rows into Rio, observed by Roger, and Zukin and Lazlov, who are already there. Zukin follows Turner while Lazlov searches Turner’s rowboat, watched by Roger. When Roger sees that Lazlov has a gun, he drops the pocketknife into Turner’s rowboat in surprise. When Tatty returns to the general store to retrieve the ship’s log, she sees Zukin watching Turner as he writes a telegram in code, which Zukin steals.

On the island, the children are attacked with arrows by two masked and whooping children. The two attackers take off their masks to reveal they are the Amazons. The Amazons confront the Swallows. The Amazons introduce themselves as Captain Nancy and Peggy Blackett, co-owners of Amazon. The children parley at Secret Harbour, where both boats are moored. When Tatty says that the Swallows are not frightened of the Amazons or the pirate who sent them, Captain Flint, Peggy reveals he is their Uncle Jim.

The Amazons challenge the Swallows to a competition: whoever captures the other’s boat keeps it and the island. John, Susan and Roger set out at dusk to raid the Amazon’s boathouse, while Tatty stays behind on the island to light leading lights to mark the safe return course to Secret Harbour.

The Amazons, anticipating the Swallows’ night raid, turn the tables and land at Secret Harbour while Swallow is away. They plan to steal Swallow when the Walkers return. Unknown to them, Tatty has observed them. As the Amazons go inland, Tatty rows Amazon out.

Turner returns to his houseboat to find it ransacked and his trunk gone. He finds John’s pocketknife, planted by the burglars. Turner calls the Harbourmaster of Rio, reports the burglary and asks that John Walker be arrested. After signing off, Turner finds Lazlov holding a gun on him. Lazlov accuses Turner of spying on Russian shipyards and stealing plans for rockets. When Turner rejects becoming a double agent, Zukin knocks him out.

Tatty, anchored offshore on Amazon, sees two men taking something off Captain Flint’s boat and loading it onto a motorboat. John rows up to Amazon and explains that since Tatty has Amazon, the Swallows have won. They sail both boats back to the island. Captain Nancy surrenders and agrees it is now “Walker Island”. John says that it will always be “Wild Cat Island”.

The next morning, having spent the night together on the island, the children are confronted by both their mothers, the Harbourmaster and police. John is accused of theft. His pocketknife was found on the houseboat, although Turner himself is missing. While the Walker children are being taken back to the mainland, Susan sees a motorboat beached on the island. Mr Jackson locks Swallow in the boathouse.

The Walker children pool their knowledge about what has happened to Captain Flint. They agree to try to rescue Flint, with the help of the Amazons, whom they contact by flashing a message in Morse code.

The Swallows set sail at dawn. Stopping at Flint’s houseboat, John retrieves a pistol. They rendezvous on the lake with the Amazons. The Russians are holding Turner on the island. They intend to take him in a seaplane, which is landing. The children confront Lazlov and Zukin on the island, with John pointing the pistol. Turner talks John out of shooting Lazlov and sends the children home.

The children sail their boats into the path of the seaplane, where Turner is stowed, tied up. The children try to stop the seaplane by passing a rope between their boats to catch the seaplane struts. The pilot is temporarily delayed but then speeds up and seaplane takes off. However, the delay allows Turner to free himself. He overpowers the crew and forces the plane to land on the lake.

The Russian are arrested in Rio. When the children ask Turner if he really is a spy, he says, “No. I am really a pirate.”

== Cast ==
- Rafe Spall as Jim Turner / "Captain Flint", the uncle of the Blackett children
- Andrew Scott as Lazlov, a "secret agent" looking for Jim Turner
- Dan Skinner as Zukin, a "secret agent" looking for Jim Turner
- Kelly Macdonald as Mrs Walker, the mother of the Walker children
- Jessica Hynes as Mrs Jackson, the wife of Mr Jackson
- Harry Enfield as Mr Jackson
- Fenella Woolgar as Miss Crummock
- Dane Hughes as John Walker
- Orla Hill as Susan Walker
- Teddie-Rose Malleson-Allen as Tatty Walker
- Bobby McCulloch as Roger Walker
- Seren Hawkes as Nancy Blackett
- Hannah Jayne Thorp as Peggy Blackett
- Elizabeth Berrington as Mrs Blackett
- John Henshaw as Harbourmaster
- Richard Bremmer as Old Billy
- Neil Bell as Young Billy

== Production ==
Principal photography on the film began on 21 June 2015 in the Lake District, North West England. The film was also shot in Yorkshire, at Plumpton Rocks parkland near Harrogate (the location for 'Wild Cat Island'). Other Yorkshire locations include Heptonstall near Hebden Bridge, Oakworth Station on the Keighley and Worth Valley Railway, and Stockeld Park, all in West Yorkshire.

Arts correspondent for The Daily Telegraph, Hannah Furness, observed,

"The original Swallows and Amazons saw its intrepid children battling the perilous waters of the Lake District summer, a grumpy uncle and, occasionally, one another. The 2016 update, a BBC film of the same name, will add one further foe to that list: gun-toting Russian spies in their midst. The tweaks to the film were inspired by the real life of author Arthur Ransome, who is now known to have been an MI6 spy. At one point, papers in the National Archive reveal, he was under suspicion of being a double agent for Russia. The film plot will use his story as the inspiration for the character of Jim Turner, always thought to have been partially based on the writer himself."

The music was composed by Ilan Eshkeri.

== Critical reception ==
On Rotten Tomatoes the film received a rating of 94%, based on 32 reviews, with an average rating of 6.7/10. On Metacritic the film received a score of 65 out of 100, based on 9 critics, indicating "generally favorable reviews".

Writing in The Daily Telegraph, Lewis Jones noted that Arthur Ransome had written in his diary "Saw the ghastly mess they have made of poor old Swallows and Amazons" after watching the BBC's 1962 series. Jones added, "I think he might have liked Philippa Lowthorpe's forthcoming film, though, which is true to the spirit of his book, and so attentive to period detail that at one point Mrs Walker smokes a cigarette". Jones outlined the film's changes to the book's character Jim Turner, writing: "In the film he is engaged in espionage and pursued by Russian agents, which gives the story some grown-up oomph, and pays fitting tribute to the author's wildly adventurous early life. For Ransome was not merely a boaty old buffer with a walrus moustache who wrote children's books. As a young journalist he reported on the Russian Revolution, was on intimate terms with its leaders and was himself an active player, which led to his recruitment by MI6."

For Alistair Harkness, writing in The Scotsman, the film "serves as a gentle reminder of the value of allowing children to get outside and explore instead of being mollycoddled by fearful parents". He added: "The film adds an espionage subplot that feels a little underpowered to really provide the intended narrative oomph, danger or excitement, but in an age in which the teen heroes and heroines of YA adaptations are routinely given ridiculously proficient combat skills, there's something nice about watching kids mucking about and learning basic wilderness skills."

Geoffrey Macnab in The Independent began by saying: "This new adaptation of Arthur Ransome's novel evokes a long-lost era in which kids didn't just spend their days searching for Pokémon or playing Call Of Duty. Instead, they had rip-roaring adventures in sailing boats and camped on remote islands." He found the "loving Hovis-ad fashion, complete with tweed caps, cardigans and idyllic villages that always seem to be full of bunting" of the filming to be evocative but was less impressed that "[f]or no apparent reason, the filmmakers have grafted on a John Buchan/Alfred Hitchcock-style spy story to proceedings". Macnab concluded, "The film is at its best when the adults are kept at bay. [It] really takes wing […] when the Swallows and Amazons are trying to steal each other's boats, making expeditions by moonlight or are planning just what they're going to eat after dropping their provisions in the lake."

Trevor Johnston in the Radio Times opined: "For today's children, this fresh adaptation of Arthur Ransome's classic Lake District tale must seem as if it's taking place on some distant planet. The brothers and sisters here are allowed to take their dinghy to the waters by themselves and even stay overnight on the island at its middle. They gut fish for dinner, navigate their way round the shores, and even find themselves in a territorial dispute with some cunning local rivals. Not a smartphone or tablet in sight, no social media updates, and no sign of an app to light a campfire when the matches have gone astray." He too remarked on the changes to the plot, deciding: "With more at stake, the drama is intensified, as director Philippa Lowthorpe […] gives everything hands-on credibility while still retaining the nostalgic appeal of bygone days [and] also works brilliantly with the junior cast." Johnston concluded that "All in all, it's an intelligent, involving, beautifully mounted adaptation of material that might easily have seemed an old-fashioned relic. And the grey, blustery Lake District weather could hardly be more British."
