= Coot Club =

1934 children's book by Arthur Ransome

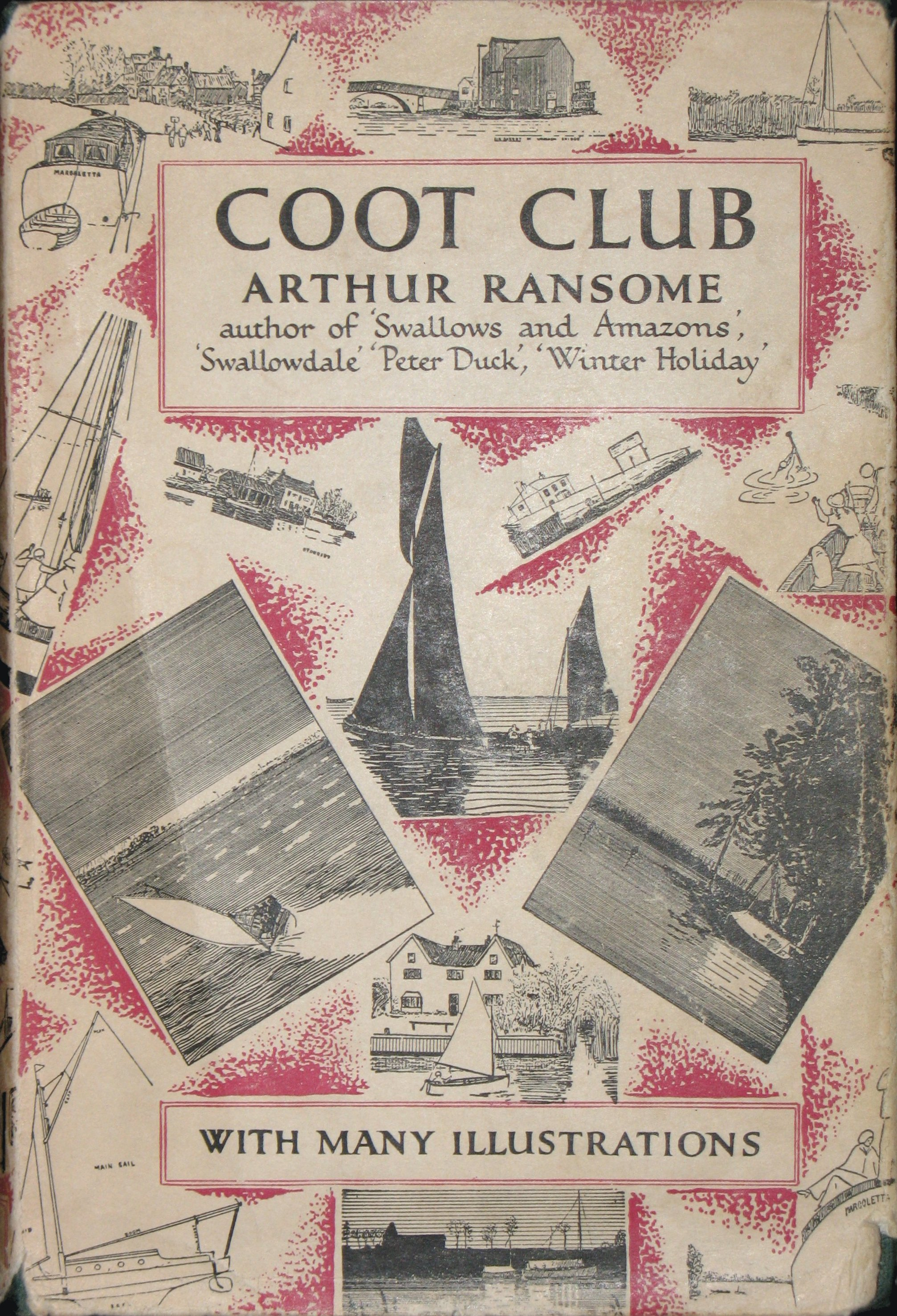
- Author: Arthur Ransome
- Cover artist: Arthur Ransome
- Language: English
- Series: Swallows and Amazons
- Genre: Children's books
- Publisher: Jonathan Cape
- Publication date: 1934
- Publication place: United Kingdom
- Media type: Print (Hardcover & Paperback)
- ISBN: 978-0-87923-787-5 (David R. Godine, Publisher: 1990, paperback)
- Preceded by: Winter Holiday
- Followed by: Pigeon Post

Coot Club is the fifth book of Arthur Ransome's Swallows and Amazons series of children's books, published in 1934. The book sees Dick and Dorothea Callum visiting the Norfolk Broads during the Easter holidays, eager to learn to sail and thus impress the Swallows and Amazons when they return to the Lake District later that year. Along with a cast of new characters, Dick and Dorothea explore the North and South Broads and become 'able seamen'.

== Plot summary ==
The Callum children, Dick and Dorothea, spend their Easter holidays on The Broads with their good-natured family friend, Mrs Barrable, who is staying on the small yacht Teasel, moored near the village of Horning. There they encounter the Coot Club, a gang of local children comprising Tom Dudgeon, twin girls 'Port' and 'Starboard' (Bess and Nell Farland; their nicknames come from one of them being left-handed and the other right-handed), and three younger boys — Joe, Bill and Pete (the "Death and Glories"). The Coot Club was formed to protect local birds and their nests from egg collectors and other disturbances. Protecting wild birds was a relatively new concept at the time.

A noisy and inconsiderate party of city-dwellers (dubbed the 'Hullabaloos' by the children) hire the motor cruiser Margoletta and threaten an important nesting site of a coot with a white feather (one of many monitored by the Coots) by mooring in front of it and blasting music from both a Victrola and powerful electric radio, and refuse to move when politely requested to do so. Despite warnings "not to mix with foreigners", Tom stealthily casts off the Margoletta's moorings to save the nest and then hides behind the Teasel. He hides for fear of disgracing his father, who is the local doctor. Casting off boats is considered unthinkable on The Broads, where the local economy is so dependent on boating. The amiable and sympathetic Mrs Barrable (also an avid nature-lover, and equally outraged at the Hullabaloos' peace-disrupting behaviour) does not give Tom away to the Hullabaloos when they angrily come looking for him, and instead asks him to teach the Callums to sail.

Tom, Port, and Starboard join the crew of the Teasel, and together with Mrs Barrable and her pug William, the children teach Dick and Dorothea the basics of sailing up and down the Broads. Mrs Barrable, Dot, and the twins sleep in Teasel, while Tom and Dick share Tom's small sailing boat Titmouse. Dick shares the Coot Club's keen interest in local bird life, and Dorothea uses the voyage as fodder for her new story, "Outlaw Of The Broads", based on the Hullabaloos' vow to catch Tom. They chase the crew of the Teasel all over the Broads. Through a piece of imprudence on the part of Mrs Barrable, Teasel and Titmouse are caught on a falling tide on Breydon Water and go aground, within shouting distance of each other, but just a little too far apart to be able to pass things between them. William the pug is encouraged to make a heroic journey across the mud towing a thread, by which a rope and heaving-line are hauled across to rig a makeshift zip-line trolley to transport food between the two vessels, without which most of the party would have had to go unfed for 12 hours.

They are still stranded on the mud when the Margoletta arrives. There is no escape, but the Hullabaloos, in their joy at running their quarry to earth, manage to crash the Margoletta into a wooden marker post, holing her hull and putting the crew in danger of drowning. At that moment the Death and Glories appear, having rowed all the way from Horning to warn Tom of the Hullabaloos' approach. They conduct a dramatic rescue, and are rewarded by the owners of the Margoletta with a salvage award which enables them to refurbish their vessel. The indignantly-fuming Hullabaloos depart in humiliated disgrace without thanking their rescuers, and Tom can return home in the knowledge that the reputation of the doctor's family is intact. It turns out that the Hullabaloos were alerted to Tom's whereabouts by George Owdon, a late-teens Horning youth who selfishly makes money by selling birds' eggs to collectors, and who therefore has no love for the Coot Club. This rivalry is the subject of the sequel, The Big Six.

== Other boats ==
The Norfolk wherry Sir Garnett gives the twins a lift when they need to catch up with the Teasel. They also get a lift from the fictional Thames barge, Welcome of Rochester. Ransome researched the book during the summer of 1933 and encountered SB Pudge of Rochester. He wrote to the owners, LRTC (London & Rochester Trading Company) for details of the cargoes Pudge carried, the routes the Pudge sailed, and which bridges she could pass under. The book describes the cabin and stateroom, and the newly fitted petrol auxiliary engine. Pudge was later fitted with the more powerful Kelvin K3 66HP engine that is present today. Ransome's description has been useful in the restoration of the Pudge.

== Film, TV or theatrical adaptations ==
The BBC produced a television series Swallows and Amazons Forever!, based on Coot Club and The Big Six, in 1984.
