= Winter Holiday (novel) =

1933 children's book by Arthur Ransome

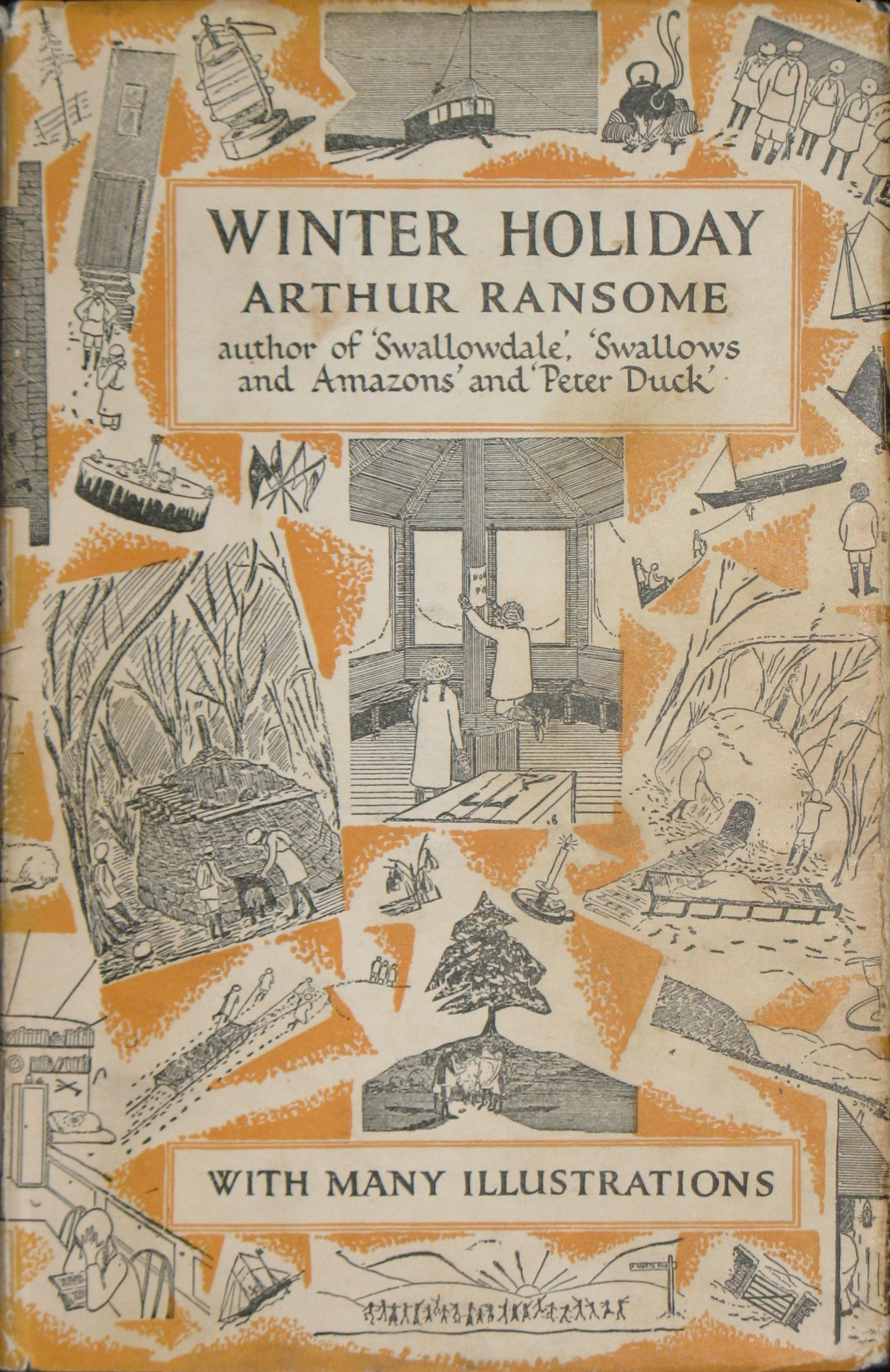
- Jonathan Cape edition
- Author: Arthur Ransome
- Cover artist: Arthur Ransome
- Language: English
- Series: Swallows and Amazons
- Genre: Children's Novel
- Published: 1933 (Jonathan Cape)
- Publication place: United Kingdom
- Media type: Print (Hardcover & Paperback)
- ISBN: 978-0224606349; 978-0224606349 (Jonathan Cape: hardback, 1933)
- Preceded by: Peter Duck
- Followed by: Coot Club

Winter Holiday is the fourth novel of Arthur Ransome's Swallows and Amazons series of children's books. It was published in 1933. In this story, the third set of major characters in the series, the Ds — Dick and Dorothea Callum — are introduced. The series' usual emphasis on boats and sailing is largely absent, since the story is set in winter. Instead, the children's activities focus on ice skating, signalling with semaphore and Morse code, and sledging.

Ransome draws on his schoolday memories of the Great Frost of 1895 when Windermere froze completely. Another major influence is Fridtjof Nansen's books about his crossing of Greenland in 1888 and his Arctic expedition from 1893 to 1896 in the Fram and by sledge, which are extensively referenced in the novel.

== Plot summary ==
Whilst observing the stars from an isolated barn, brother and sister Dick and Dorothea encounter the Swallows and Amazons and soon become firm friends. They become part of the group, and join in their play of Arctic expeditions. The holiday is extended when leader Nancy Blackett catches mumps and the group is quarantined and cannot return to their boarding schools. Initially, while waiting for snow to fall, the children embark on a series of adventures ranging from rebuilding an igloo to building an ice sled. Dick displays heroism by rescuing a sheep belonging to Farmer Dixon stranded on an ice-covered ledge, thus gaining his gratitude and earning them a sledge of their own.

There is a heavy snowfall followed by a prolonged period of freezing weather and, unusually, the lake freezes over, providing an excellent opportunity for an expedition to the point at the head of the lake that they have named the "North Pole". However, plans go awry when the Ds set out earlier than expected due to a misunderstanding over a signal flag. When a blizzard blows up and the Ds are missing, a rescue party is organised consisting of the Swallows and Peggy, one of the Amazons.
