= Secret Water =

1939 children's book by Arthur Ransome

- First edition
- Author: Arthur Ransome
- Language: English
- Series: Swallows and Amazons
- Publisher: Jonathan Cape
- Publication date: 28 November 1939
- Publication place: United Kingdom
- Media type: Print (Hardcover & Paperback)
- ISBN: 978-1-56792-064-2 (David R. Godine, Publisher: paperback, 1996)
- Preceded by: We Didn't Mean to Go to Sea
- Followed by: The Big Six

Secret Water is the eighth book in Arthur Ransome's Swallows and Amazons series of children's books. It was published on 28 November 1939.

This book is set in and around Hamford Water in Essex, close to the resort town of Walton-on-the-Naze. It starts only a few days after We Didn't Mean to Go to Sea ends.

It brings the Swallows and the Amazons together and introduces a new group of characters, the Eels and the Mastodon. Ransome used to sail to Hamford Water, an area of tidal salt marshes and low-lying islands, in his yacht Nancy Blackett. He set the book here to offer his characters new opportunities to explore and make maps in a different landscape.

== Plot summary ==
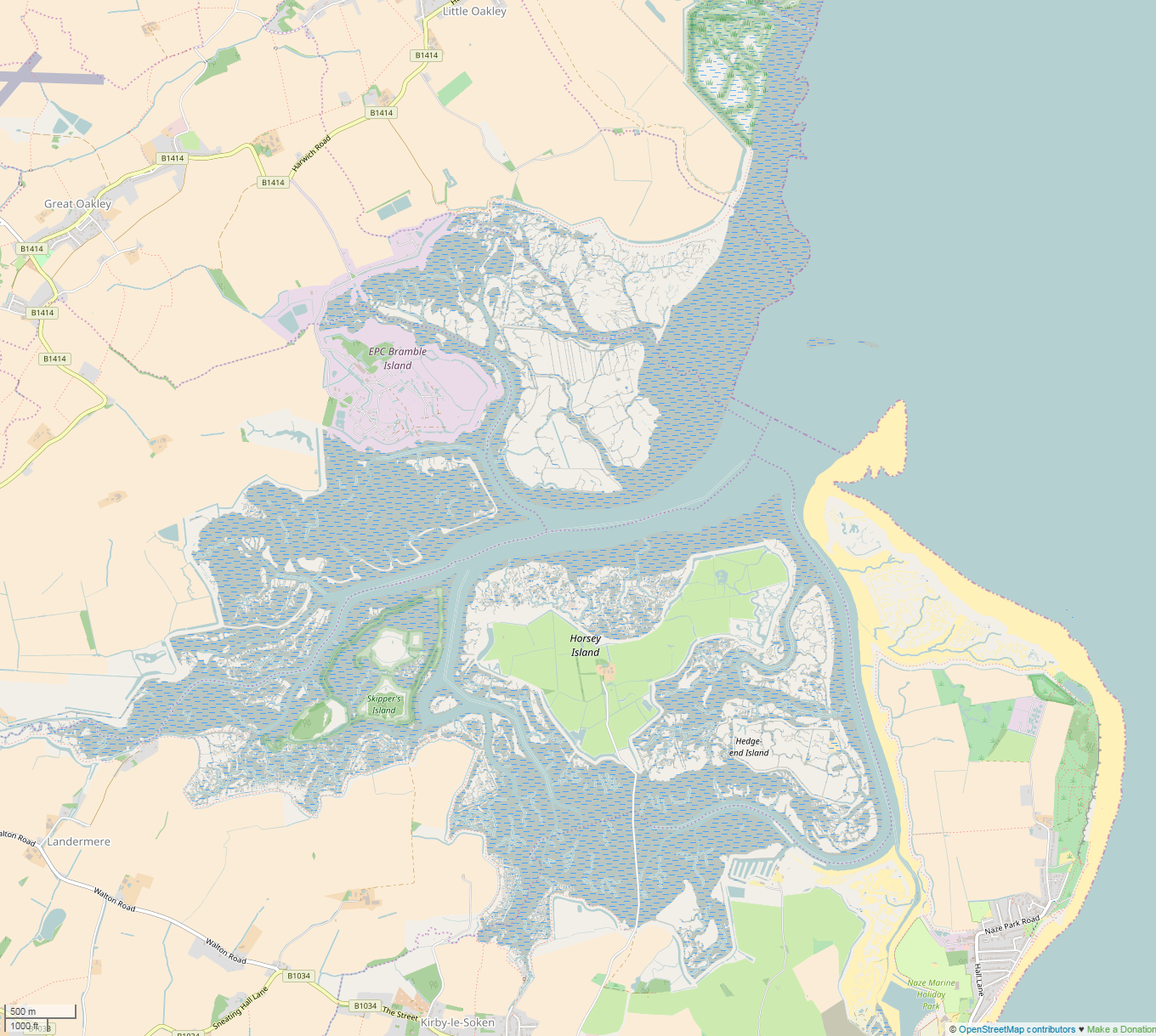
A map showing where Secret Water is set. Click to enlarge.

The Swallows intend to sail in the Goblin (as featured in We Didn't Mean to Go to Sea) to Hamford Water and camp with their father, but he is called away on naval business. To compensate, he maroons them with a small dinghy on an island. Before he leaves, Father gives them an outline map of the area they decide to call Secret Water, and suggests they survey and chart the area before he returns to pick them up. For the first time, their small sister Bridget accompanies them on this adventure.

Titty and Bridget then find some mysterious footprints, which they think look as though they were made by a Mastodon; when nobody else seems to have any interest, they return to their camp, where they find a totem pole of an eel. They spot somebody escaping in a dinghy, and they track the person to his lair; it turns out that the footprints had been left by a local boy named Donald, whom they nickname the "Mastodon", wearing "splatchers" (mud-shoes), and he left the totem pole because he mistook them for the Eels, another family who camp in the area regularly. For a surprise, Father has arranged for the Amazons to come down from the Lake District and join them with another dinghy, named the Firefly.

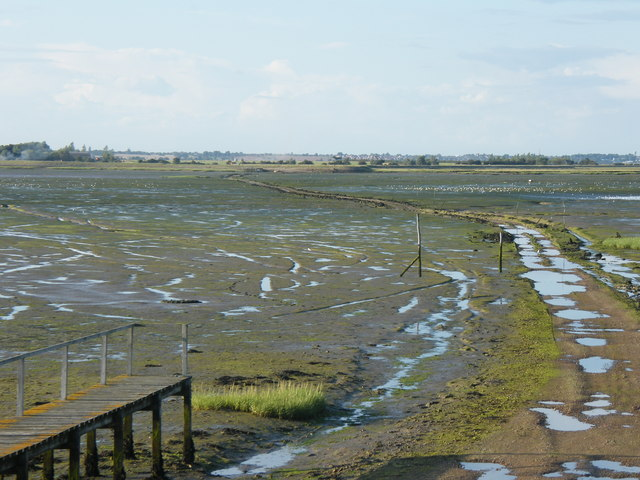
Island Road at low tide—the ford where Roger, Titty and Bridget are trapped

The Amazons then suggest that everybody becomes "blood brothers", which, after Bridget pricks herself from hunting berries, they do successfully. They take the Mastodon as their native guide, and they chart several islands. Later, the Eels arrive, and are initially hostile—to the point of kidnapping Bridget—but when they discover that the protagonists are now blood brothers of the Eels, they settle down for a friendly war, culminating with feast of the Sacred Eel, complete with "human sacrifice". The "sacrifice" is Bridget, who very nearly does not arrive at her party, as a result of being trapped in the middle of a ford by a rising tide with Titty and Roger. The danger is genuine, since high tide level would have been well above their heads. Just before they have to swim for the shore, they are rescued by the Mastodon.

It seems that due to the distractions of war and being cut off by the tides, the chart will not be completed. John is very disappointed about this, especially since the Swallows and Amazons have to leave the morning after the feast. However, early in the morning, two separate groups of children—Titty and Roger in their dinghy the Wizard, and the Amazons in Firefly—complete it.
