= Swallows and Amazons (TV series) =

- Starring: John Paul; Susan George
- Country of origin: United Kingdom
- No. of series: 1
- No. of episodes: 6

Production
- Running time: 25 minutes per episode

Original release
- Network: BBC
- Release: 3 September 1963 – 1963

Swallows and Amazons is a 1963 BBC children's television series based on the 1930 novel of the same name by Arthur Ransome, about the holiday adventures of two groups of children, the Swallows (Walkers) and the Amazons (Blacketts), sailing on a lake and camping on an island in the Lake District in the 1930s.

The series of 6 episodes was shot on location on Coniston Water and Windermere. Arthur Ransome, who lived at Hilltop near Haverthwaite, was not impressed:

They began by proposing to blow up some of the rocks in the Peel Island harbour, and went on from there. According to Arthur their child-actors were ugly, their Captain Flint was 'common', their script a travesty of his book, their rural characters were made to talk Cockney, and they introduced some Cockney villains. Genia (his wife, who was always discouraging about his books when he was writing them) missed no chance of telling him he was a fool ever to have consented to the project, and he sadly agreed with her.

== Characters ==
- John Paul as Captain Flint
- David Lott as John Walker
- Siobhan Taylor as Susan Walker
- Susan George as Kitty (renamed from Titty)
- Shane Younger as Roger Walker
- Mandy Harper (also known as Amanda Coxall or Mandy Dunn) as Nancy Blackett
- Paula Boyd as Peggy Blackett
- Mary Kenton as Mrs Walker
- Ruth Kettlewell as Mrs Jackson
- Bernard Kay as Sammy the Policeman
- Sam Kydd as Young Billie, a charcoal-burner
- Michael Ripper as Old Billie, a charcoal-burner
- George Roderick as Sam Packer, a burglar
- Anthony Sagar as Ernie Kidd, a burglar

The director was Peter Saunders and the music was composed by Alfred Elms.
