= Captain Flint =

Fictional pirate in Stevenson's Treasure Island

- Treasure Island character
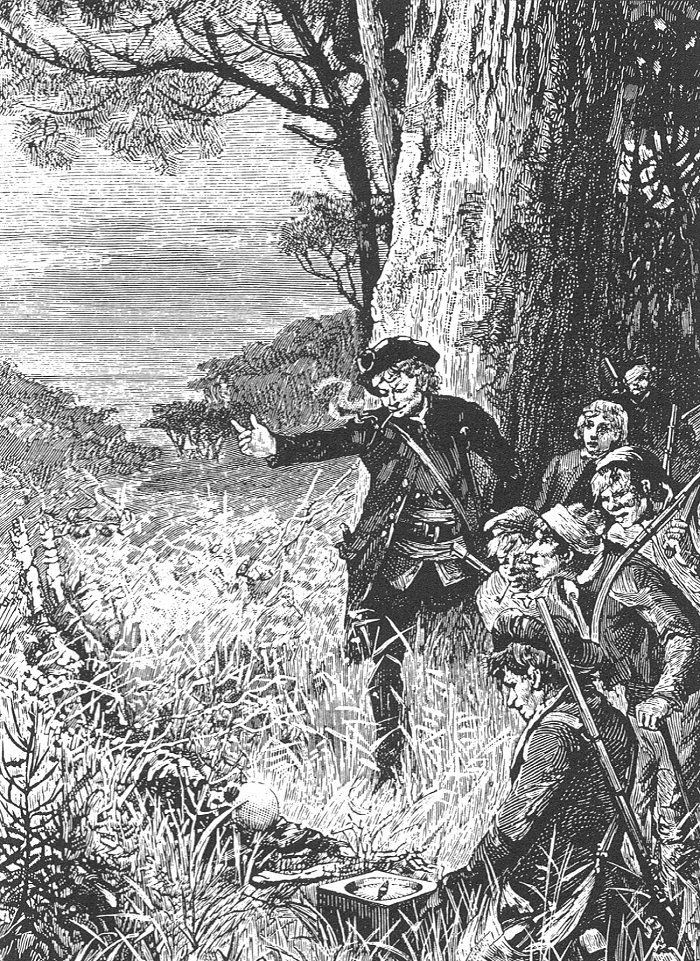
- Long John Silver and Jim Hawkins finding the skeleton of seaman Allardyce, illustration by Georges Roux, 1885
- Created by: Robert Louis Stevenson
- Portrayed by: Valery Chiglyayev; & Yuri Nevgamonny; (Return to Treasure Island); Toby Stephens (Black Sails)
- Voiced by: Peter Cullen (Treasure Planet)

In-universe information
- Full name: J. Flint
- Species: Human
- Gender: Male
- Title: Pirate Captain
- Occupation: Pirate
- Nationality: English

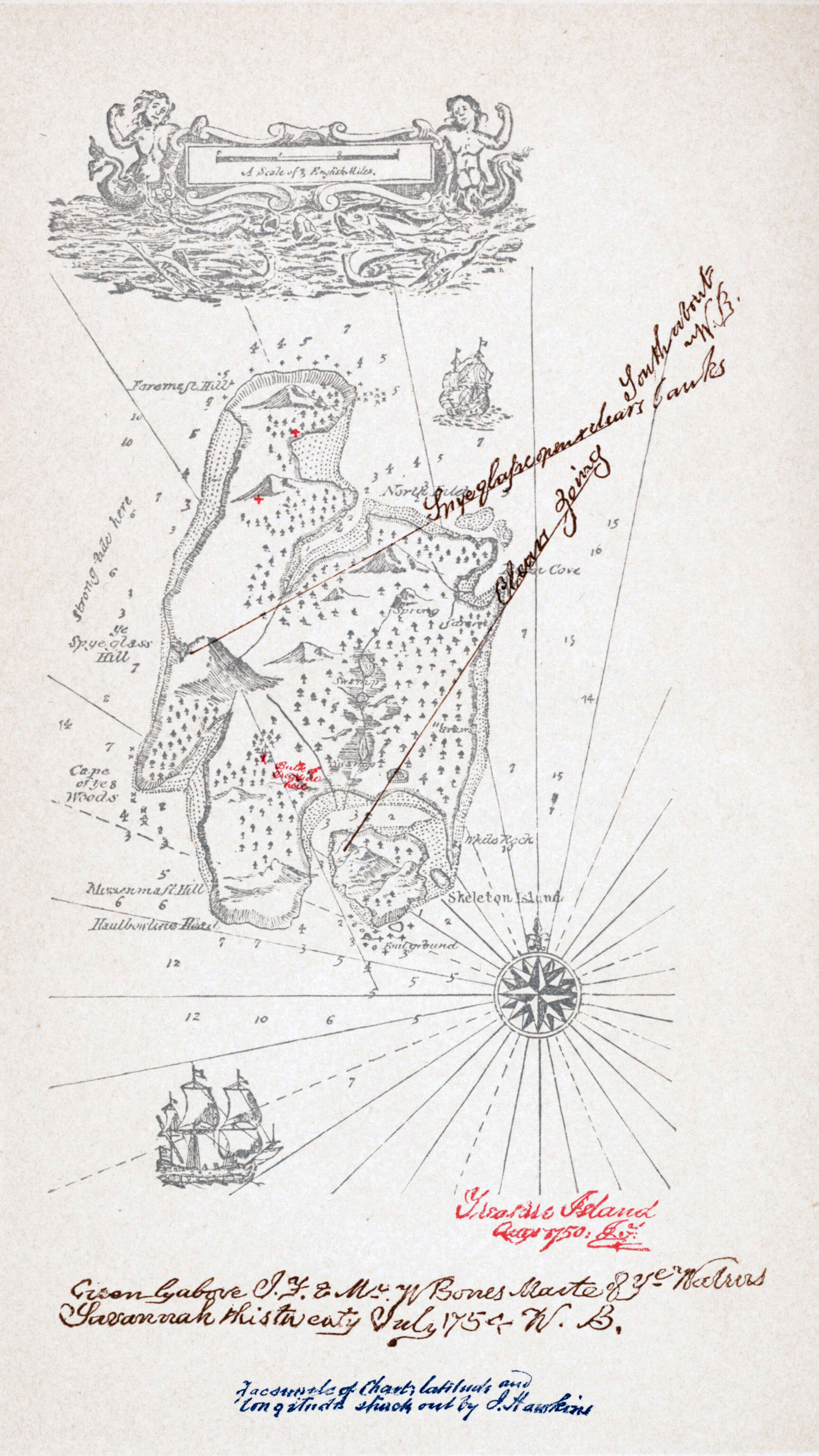
Map created by Robert Louis Stevenson

Captain J. Flint is a fictional golden age pirate captain who features in a number of novels, television series, and films. The original character was created by the Scottish writer Robert Louis Stevenson (1850–1894). Flint first appears in the classic adventure yarn Treasure Island, which was first serialised in a children's magazine in 1881, and later published as a novel in 1883.

== In Treasure Island ==
Captain Flint is a fictional character in the book Treasure Island, created by Robert Louis Stevenson in 1883. In Stevenson's book, Flint, whose first name is not given, was the captain of a pirate ship, the Walrus, which accumulated an enormous amount of captured treasure, approximately £700,000. On 1 August 1750, Flint and seven members of his crew bury the plunder on an island located somewhere in the Caribbean Sea. Flint then murders all his assistants, leaving the body of one, Allardyce, with its legs outstretched in the direction of "E.S.E. and by E." with arms opposite.

The only person Flint was said to fear was his quartermaster John Silver, who later even called his parrot "Captain Flint" in mockery.

Flint is said to have died in Pirates' House in Savannah, Georgia, many years before the book's central plot takes place. His last words were, "Darby M'Graw - fetch aft the rum...." His death was said to have been caused by the effects of drinking too much rum. The location of the treasure had been marked by Flint on a map entrusted to his first mate William "Billy" Bones. The inscription on the map suggests that Flint died on 28 July 1754. With the exception of Long John Silver, many of Flint's crew spend their ill-gotten booty and end up begging (e.g. Blind Pew). Bones is too much of a drunk to find the rest of the treasure and too miserly to give up the map. He becomes a marked man three years after Flint's death, pursued by Flint's old crew, including Blind Pew, Black Dog, Job Anderson, and Israel Hands, led by Long John Silver. They track down Bones (who, like Flint, dies of the effects of alcoholism). Before they can get the map, it falls into the hands of the protagonist of the novel, Jim Hawkins.

== Other novels ==
Flint has a major part in the 1924 prequel Porto Bello Gold, by A. D. Howden Smith, which describes how the treasure was captured from a Spanish galleon. In this version, Flint is described as having started his piracy career as the junior partner of Andrew Murray, an idealistic Jacobite turned pirate, who is not referenced in Stevenson's original book. Flint gradually becomes the dominant partner. The book describes how Flint secretly buries the treasure which would be recovered a generation later by the protagonists of Treasure Island.

John Drake's prequels, Flint and Silver (2008), Pieces of Eight (2009), and Skull and Bones (2010), all heavily feature Captain Flint and give his Christian name as Joseph.

Flint is mentioned in the novel Peter and Wendy by J. M. Barrie, a friend of Stevenson. The first mention is in a passage introducing Captain Hook's pirate crew: "Here is Bill Jukes, every inch of him tattooed, the same Bill Jukes who got six dozen on the WALRUS from Flint before he would drop the bag of moidores." The second mention is as Hook is attempting to intimidate the Darling children and the Lost Boys, but is heckled by his inner demons: "'I am the only man whom Barbecue feared,' he urged, 'and Flint feared Barbecue.' 'Barbecue, Flint—what house?' came the cutting retort."

In Arthur Ransome's book Swallows and Amazons, the Blacketts' uncle James Turner is nicknamed Captain Flint by the Walkers. This is because they believed that he looked like a retired pirate and took the name from Treasure Island. He is nearly always referred to by this name in the rest of the books.

== Appearances in film ==
Flint appears briefly in the Soviet comedy adaptation Return to Treasure Island in some live-action scenes, although not in the "main story" hand-drawn part. At the very beginning of the film, he is seen digging his treasure and completing his map. In the same scene, some pirates try to kill Flint to get that map, but end up killing each other instead in a cartoon-ish manner, for they were unable to peacefully decide who should have it. However, Billy Bones appears among them from his hiding place behind a tree and shoots Flint, retrieving the map from his body. Nevertheless, a character meant to be Flint or resembling him (possibly his ghost) still appears in most of the live-action scenes, ending with the final scene, in which he comments that the movie is over, so he "won't be probably killed". He was played by Valery Chiglyayev throughout the movie and Yuri Nevgamonny in the second part of the movie, the Ben Gunn story.

In the film Muppet Treasure Island, a loose adaptation of the Stevenson story, Captain Flint is shown at the opening scene burying the treasure and subsequently killing all the crew who buried it for him. He then sails away from the location and gives his map to Billy Bones, who takes it with him. Flint has fifteen crew members to dig the treasure pit in this version instead of six, and treasure itself is guineas and pieces of eight. In the film, Benjamina Gunn mentions he is known as Bernie Flint.

Captain Flint was shown briefly in the animated feature film Treasure Planet by Disney. In this film, the character was voiced by Peter Cullen and known as Nathaniel Flint, a space pirate of non-human origins whose reputation was legendary for leading his ship and his crew to plunder merchant ships, infamously appearing and disappearing without a trace, and eventually burying his treasure (called by many "Flint's Trove" and/or "the loot of a thousand worlds") inside the giant alien mechanism known as Treasure Planet. To make sure nobody would steal his treasure, he rigged the planet to explode should anyone set off the booby trap and stole the memory of navigational robot B.E.N so he would not tell anyone about it.

== Appearances on television ==
Pirate flag of J. Flint's ship, the Walrus.

Set roughly four decades before the events of Treasure Island, the 2014 televised series Black Sails follows the adventures of Captain Flint and his pirate crew. His first name is given as James in episode "VI". Episodes "IX" and "XIII" reveal that he is a disgraced former Royal Navy lieutenant named James McGraw, dismissed from service for falling in love and having affairs with Lord Thomas Hamilton and with his wife. He was exiled from England with Thomas's wife, Miranda Barlow, who had since hidden herself as a lowly Puritan lady on the trading island of New Providence. Lord Thomas Hamilton was the son of Lord Alfred Hamilton, lord proprietor of the Bahama Islands. McGraw adopted the name "Flint" after a mysterious man who boarded his grandfather's ship while anchored and then disappeared. He is portrayed by Toby Stephens.
