= Godine =

American book publisher

- Status: Active
- Founded: 1970
- Founder: David R. Godine
- Country of origin: United States
- Headquarters location: Boston
- Distribution: Ingram / Two Rivers
- Key people: Will Thorndike, President David Allender, Publisher Celia Johnson, Senior Editor
- Publication types: Books
- Nonfiction topics: Narrative nonfiction Philosophy Memoir
- Fiction genres: Literary fiction Poetry Children's books for all ages
- Imprints: Black Sparrow
- No. of employees: 5
- Official website: www.godine.com

Godine is a New England–based independent book publisher.

== History ==
Godine was founded in 1970 by David R. Godine, who acted as publisher until his retirement in 2019. Leadership of the company was then assumed by Will Thorndike.

In March 2020, Godine partnered with Two Rivers / Ingram to distribute their publications.

== Notable authors and awards ==
- Thomas W. Gilbert, Casey Award: Best Baseball Book of the Year, 2020
- Richard Howard, National Book Award for Translated Literature, 1983
- Bob Keyes, Rabkin Prize for Visual Arts Journalism, 2017
- J.M.G. Le Clézio, Nobel Prize in Literature, 2008
- Patrick Modiano, Nobel Prize in Literature, 2014
- Richard Rodriguez, Anisfield-Wolf Book Award, 1983 Frankel Medal from the National Endowment for the Humanities, Pulitzer Prize finalist in nonfiction
- Simon Van Booy, Frank O'Connor International Short Story Award, 2009
