= Outline of the history of the United States =

The following outline is provided as an overview of and a topical guide to the history of the United States.

== By period ==
- Prehistory of the United States
- History of the United States
  - Pre-Columbian era
  - Colonial history of the United States
  - 1776–1789
  - 1789–1815
  - 1815–1849
  - 1849–1865
  - 1865–1917
  - 1917–1945
  - 1945–1964
  - 1964–1980
  - 1980–1991
  - 1991–2016
  - 2016–present

=== Named eras and periods ===
These multi-year periods are commonly identified in American history. The existence and dating of some of these periods is debated by historians.

- Plantation era (c. 1700 – c. 1860)
- First Great Awakening (1730s–1740s)
- American Revolution (1775–1783)
- Confederation period (1781–1789)
- Federalist Era (1788–1800)
- Second Great Awakening (c. 1800 – c. 1840)
- First-wave feminism (19th century–early 20th century)
- Manifest Destiny (c. 1812 – c. 1860)
- Era of Good Feelings (c. 1817 – c. 1825)
- Jacksonian Era (c. 1820 – c. 1845)
- The Slave Power (c. 1840 – c. 1875)
- California Gold Rush (1848–1855)
- Greater Reconstruction (c. 1848 – c. 1898)
- American Civil War (1861–1865)
- Reconstruction era (c. 1865–1877)
- Gilded Age (1869–c. 1896)
- Jim Crow era (1876–1965)
- Gay Nineties (1890s)
- Nadir of American race relations (c. 1890–1940)
- Progressive Era (1890s–1920s)
- Lochner era (c. 1897 – c. 1937)
- American Century (20th century)
- Great Migration (c. 1910 – c. 1940)
- World War I (c. 1914 – c. 1918)
- First Red Scare (1917–1920)
- Prohibition in the United States (1919–1933)
- Roaring Twenties (1920s)
- Jazz Age (1920s)
- Great Depression (1929–1939)
- Dust Bowl (1930–1936)
- New Deal era (1933–1938)
- World War II (1939-1945)
- Second Great Migration (c. 1941 – c. 1970)
- Cold War (1947–1991)
- Second Red Scare (1947–1957)
- Civil rights era (1954–1968)
- Space Race (1957–1975)
- Second-wave feminism (1960s–1970s)
- New Great Migration (1965–present)
- Détente (c. 1969–1979)
- 1970s energy crisis (1973–1980)
- Reagan Era (1980–1992)
- Neoconservatism (1980s–2000s)
- Dot-com bubble (c. 1995–2000)
- United States housing bubble (c. 2001 – c. 2005)
- War on terror (2001–2021)

Political parties

These periods are commonly identified as the large changes within political parties. Newer Party Systems are typically disputed by experts and historians due to the complexity of changes in political parties.

- First Party System (c. 1788 – c. 1824)
- Second Party System (c. 1828 – c. 1854)
- Third Party System (c. 1854 – c. 1894)
- Fourth Party System (c. 1896 – c. 1930)
- Fifth Party System (c. 1932 – c. 1976)
- Sixth Party System (c. 1980 – c. 2016)
- Seventh Party System (c. 2016–present)

Wars

See List of wars involving the United States.

=== Timelines and lists ===
- Timeline of pre–United States history
- Timeline of the history of the United States (1760–1789)
- Timeline of the history of the United States (1790–1819)
- Timeline of the history of the United States (1820–1859)
- Timeline of the history of the United States (1860–1899)
- Timeline of the history of the United States (1900–1929)
- Timeline of the history of the United States (1930–1949)
- Timeline of the history of the United States (1950–1969)
- Timeline of the history of the United States (1970–1989)
- Timeline of the history of the United States (1990–2009)
- Timeline of the history of the United States (2010–present)
- List of years in the United States

==== Pre–1776 ====
- On October 12, 1492, three Spanish ships under the command of Cristoforo Colombo (Christopher Columbus) landed on the Lucayan island of Guanahani which he names San Salvador (The Savior).
- On November 14, 1493, a Spanish fleet under the command of Columbus lands on a large inhabited island which he names Santa Cruz (Holy Cross, now Saint Croix). Columbus then visits and names San Tomas (Saint Thomas) and San Juan (Saint John). Columbus names the archipelago Santa Ursula y las Once Mil Vírgenes (Saint Ursula and her 11,000 virgins, now the Virgin Islands).
- On November 19, 1493, Columbus lands on the large Taíno island of Borikén which he names San Juan Bautista (Saint John the Baptist, now Puerto Rico and part of the United States).
- On August 8, 1508, Spanish conquistador Juan Ponce de León establishes Capárra, the first European settlement on the island of San Juan Bautista in Puerto Rico.
- On Easter Sunday, April 2, 1513, a Spanish expedition led by Juan Ponce de León lands on a huge inhabited island (later determined to be a continental peninsula) which he names La Pascua Florida (the Feast of Flowers, now Florida).
- On March 6, 1521, three Spanish ships under the command of Fernão de Magalhães (Ferdinand Magellan) land on the Island of Guam after a seemingly endless eleven week voyage across the Pacific Ocean. Magellan names the archipelago Las Isles de las Velas Latinas (The Islands of the Latine Sails). When the Spaniards refuse to pay for supplies, natives take iron from the ships. Magellan renames the archipelago Las Islas de los Ladrones (The Islands of the Thieves).
- In May 1539, Spanish explorer Hernando de Soto lands nine ships at southern Tampa Bay in Florida with 620 men and 220 horses.
- In 1540, Hernando de Soto leads his expedition through Georgia, South Carolina, North Carolina, Alabama and Mississippi.
- In May 1541, Hernando de Soto reaches the Mississippi River and explores Arkansas, Texas, Tennessee and Oklahoma.
- A Spanish expedition led by Juan Rodríguez Cabrillo lands at a bay of the Pacific Ocean which he names San Miguel (Saint Michael, now San Diego, California) on September 28, 1542.
- A Spanish expedition led by Tristán de Luna y Arellano establishes a colony at Santa Maria de Ochuse (Pensacola, Florida) on August 15, 1559.
  - A hurricane destroys most of the Ochuse colony five weeks later on September 19, 1559.
- Jean Ribault explores the Atlantic coast of Florida for France in 1562.
- French Huguenots led by René Goulaine de Laudonnière establish Fort de la Caroline on June 22, 1564
- Spanish Governor Pedro Menéndez de Avilés establishes a colony about 10 leagues (56 kilometers or 35 miles) farther south at San Agustín (St. Augustine, Florida) on September 8, 1565
- Spanish Governor Pedro Menéndez de Avilés captures Fort de la Caroline on September 20, 1565
  - Governor Menéndez orders the execution of 140 Huguenots from Fort de la Caroline and orders fort rebuilt as Fuerte San Mateo on September 29, 1565
  - Governor Menéndez orders the execution of Jean Ribault and 350 shipwrecked Huguenots on October 12, 1565
- French raiders led by Dominique de Gourgues destroy Fuerte San Mateo and murder all its defenders on April 27–28, 1567
- Spanish Jesuit priests establish Mission Santa Maria on Ajacán (the Virginia Peninsula) on September 10, 1570 – 1572
- Spain, Portugal, Italy, and the Polish–Lithuanian Commonwealth adopt the new Gregorian calendar on October 15, 1582 (New Style)
- English establish Roanoke Colony on Roanoke Island in Virginia (now North Carolina) in July 1585
- On August 18, 1590, a resupply party finds the Roanoke Colony dismantled and deserted. The fate of the settlers remains a mystery.
- Spanish Governor Juan de Oñate Salazar founds the colony of Santa Fé de Nuevo Méjico (New Mexico) at San Juan de los Caballeros on July 11, 1598
- French establish the colony of l'Acadie (Acadia) on Île Sainte-Croix (Saint Croix Island, Maine), June 1604 – 1605
- English establish the Virginia Colony on Jamestown Island on May 14, 1607
- English establish the Popham Colony along the Kennebec River (Maine) on August 13, 1607 – August 1607
- First Anglo-Powhatan War, 1609–1613
- Spanish Governor Pedro de Peralta moves the capital of Santa Fé de Nuevo Méjico (New Mexico) from San Juan de los Caballeros to La Villa Real de la Santa Fé de San Francisco de Asís (Santa Fe) in 1610
- The first slave ship arrives in Jamestown, Virginia, in 1619
- English Puritans establish the Plymouth Colony on November 11, 1620
- Netherlands establish the province of Nieuw-Nederland (New Netherland) along the Hudson River in May 1624
- English Puritans establish the Newe-England Colony on September 6, 1628
- King Charles I of England grants the Newe-England Colony a royal charter as the Governour and Company of the Mattachusetts Bay in Newe-England on March 4, 1629
- The Town of Boston is chartered and named capital of the Massachusetts Bay Colony, September 7, 1630
- English Puritans establish the Saybrook Colony along the Connecticut River, 1635
- English Puritans establish the River Colony along the Connecticut River, March 3, 1636
- Roger Williams establishes the Colony of Providence, June 1636
- Pequot War, July 20, 1636 – May 26, 1637
- Swedish establish the colony of Nya Sverige (New Sweden) along the Delaware River, March 29, 1638
- English establish the Newe-Haven Colony, April 14, 1638
- Anne Hutchinson establishes the first of the colonies of Rhode Island, 1638
- King Charles II grants a charter for the Colony of Providence Plantations including the Colony of Providence and the colonies of Rhode Island, March 1644
- Second Anglo-Powhatan War, 1644–1646
- The Connecticut Colony annexes the Saybrook Colony, 1644
- King Charles II of England grants the River Colony a royal charter as the Colony of Connecticut, May 1662
- King Charles II of England grants a royal charter for the Colony of Rhode Island and Providence Plantations, 1663
- England seizes New Netherland from the Netherlands, August 27, 1664. England splits New Netherland into the Province of New-York and the Province of New-Jersey.
- The Colony of Connecticut annexes the New-Haven Colony, January 5, 1665
- Second Anglo-Dutch War, March 4, 1665 – July 31, 1667
- Third Anglo-Dutch War, April 7, 1672 – March 5, 1674
  - A Netherlands fleet under the command of Cornelis Evertsen de Jongste captures the Province of New-York, August 1673.
  - Netherlands military government of New Netherland, August 1673 – March 5, 1674
  - Treaty of Westminster, February 19, 1674
  - England regains control of the Province of New-York, March 5, 1674
- The Province of New-Jersey is split into the Province of East Jersey and the Province of West Jersey, March 18, 1673
- King Philip's War, June 8, 1675 – August 12, 1676
- Pueblo Revolt in Santa Fé de Nuevo Méjico, August 10, 1680 – September 14, 1692
  - Popé leads revolt of Puebloan peoples against Spanish rule, European culture, and Christian religion, August 10, 1680
  - Spanish settlers flee Santa Fé for El Paso del Norte, August 21, 1680
  - New Spanish Governor Diego de Vargas Zapata y Luján Ponce de León y Contreras reconquers Santa Fé de Nuevo Méjico, September 14, 1692
- King Charles II of England grants William Penn a charter for the Province of Pennsylvania, March 4, 1681
- William Penn leases the three lower counties on the Delaware River (Delaware) from James, Duke of York, March 1682
- William Penn writes the first Frame of Government of Pennsylvania (including the three lower counties on the Delaware River), April 2, 1682
- Dominion of New-England in America, June 3, 1686 – May 18, 1689
  - England creates the Dominion of New-England in America to rule the Colony of Massachusetts Bay, the Colony of New-Plymouth, the Province of New-Hampshire, the Province of Main, and the Narraganset Country or King's Province, June 3, 1686
  - England adds the Colony of Rhode Island and Providence Plantations and the Connecticut Colony to the Dominion of New England in America, September 9, 1686
  - England adds the Province of New-York, the Province of East Jersey, and the Province of West Jersey to the Dominion of New-England in America, May 7, 1688
  - The government of the Dominion of New-England in America collapses, May 18, 1689. The Colony of Massachusetts Bay, the Colony of New-Plymouth, the Province of New-Hampshire, the Province of Main, the Narraganset Country or King's Province as the Dominion of New-England in America, the Colony of Rhode Island and Providence Plantations, the Connecticut Colony, the Province of New-York, the Province of East Jersey, and the Province of West Jersey resume their previous self-governance.
- King William's War, 1689 – September 20, 1697
  - Treaty of Ryswick, September 20, 1697
- English diarchs William III and Mary II organize the Province of Massachusetts Bay as a crown colony including the Massachusetts Bay Colony, the New-Plymouth Colony, Martha's Vineyard, Nantucket Island, the Province of Maine, and the English claims in Nova Scotia, October 7, 1691
- Governor Francis Nicholson moves the capital of the Province of Maryland from Saint Mary's City to Anne Arundel's Towne which he renames Annapolis, 1694
- England reunites the Province of East Jersey and the Province of West Jersey as the Province of New-Jersey
- Queen Anne's War, 1702 – April 11, 1713
  - Treaty of Utrecht, April 11, 1713
- William Penn grants the three lower counties on the Delaware River their own General Assembly, making Delaware a semi-autonomous region of the Province of Pennsylvania, November 1704 – July 4, 1776
- The Kingdom of England and the Kingdom of Scotland unite to become the Kingdom of Great Britain on May 1, 1707. England's colonies become British colonies.
- Tuscarora War, 1711 – February 11, 1715
- France cedes l'Acadie to England with the Treaty of Utrecht, April 11, 1713
- Yamasee War, 1715–1717
- Dummer's War, 1721–1725
- King George II of Great Britain grants James Oglethorpe a charter for the Province of Georgia, April 21, 1732
- War of Jenkins' Ear, 1739–1748
- King George's War, 1740 – October 18, 1748
  - Treaty of Aix-la-Chapelle, October 18, 1748
- Spain establishes El Presidio Reál San Ignacio de Tubac in Sonora y Sinaloa (now Arizona), June 2, 1752
- The Kingdom of Great Britain and the British Empire adopt the Gregorian calendar, September 14, 1752
- French and Indian War, May 28, 1754 – February 10, 1763
  - Britain orders all French Acadians to leave Nova Scotia in Le Grand Dérangement, August 11, 1755
  - Treaty of Paris, February 10, 1763
- Pontiac's Rebellion, 1763–1767
- Royal Proclamation of 1763, October 7, 1763
  - British Indian Reserve, October 7, 1763 – September 3, 1783
- War of the Regulation, 1764–1771
- Spain establishes El Presidio Reál de San Diego in California, May 14, 1769
- British troops kill five civilians in Boston on March 5, 1770
- Spain establishes colony of Las Californias, June 3, 1770 – March 26, 1804
  - Spain establishes El Presidio Reál de San Carlos de Monterey on June 3, 1770
- Dunmore's War, 1773–1774
- The Parliament of Great Britain passes the Massachusetts Government Act on May 20, 1774
  - The Massachusetts Provincial Congress is organized on October 7, 1774, in response to the Massachusetts Government Act
- American Revolutionary War, April 19, 1775 – September 3, 1783
  - Battles of Lexington and Concord on April 19, 1775

==== 1776–1825 ====
- The Province of New Hampshire adopts a constitution for an independent State of New Hampshire, January 5, 1776
- The Province of South Carolina adopts a constitution for an independent State of South Carolina on March 15, 1776
- The Colony of Rhode Island and Providence Plantations declares its independence from the Kingdom of Great Britain on May 4, 1776
- The Colony of Connecticut declares its independence from the Kingdom of Great Britain on June 18, 1776
- The Colony of Virginia adopts a constitution for an independent Commonwealth of Virginia on June 29, 1776
- The Province of New Jersey adopts a constitution for an independent State of New Jersey on July 2, 1776
- The 13 British North American provinces of Virginia, Massachusetts Bay, Maryland, Connecticut, Rhode Island and Providence Plantations, New York, New Jersey, New Hampshire, Pennsylvania and Delaware, South Carolina, North Carolina, and Georgia united as the United States of America declare their independence from the Kingdom of Great Britain on July 4, 1776
- The Republic of New Connecticut declares its independence from the Kingdom of Great Britain on January 15, 1777
- The Republic of New Connecticut changes its name to Vermont on June 2, 1777
- Battles of Saratoga on September 19 and October 7, 1777
- Battle of the Chesapeake on September 5, 1781
- Siege of Yorktown, September 28 – October 19, 1781
- Treaty of Paris signed on September 3, 1783
- Spain establishes El Presidio Reál de San Francisco de Asis in Las Californias, September 17, 1776
- English explorer James Cook becomes the first European to visit the Hawaiian Islands which he names the Sandwich Islands, January 18, 1778
- The Constitution of the Commonwealth of Massachusetts takes effect on October 25, 1780, changing the name of the State of Massachusetts Bay.
- Spain establishes El Presidio Reál de Santa Barbara in Las Californias, April 21, 1782
- Northwest Indian War, 1785 – August 3, 1795
  - Treaty of Greenville, August 3, 1795
- Shays' Rebellion, August 29, 1786 – May 25, 1787
- The Philadelphia Convention writes a new Constitution of the United States, May 25 – September 17, 1787
- The Congress of the Confederation organizes the Territory Northwest of the River Ohio, July 13, 1787
- The State of Delaware becomes the 1st state to ratify the Constitution, December 7, 1787
- The Commonwealth of Pennsylvania becomes the 2nd state to ratify the Constitution, December 12, 1787
- The State of New Jersey becomes the 3rd state to ratify the Constitution, December 18, 1787
- The State of Georgia becomes the 4th state to ratify the Constitution, January 2, 1788
- The State of Connecticut becomes the 5th state to ratify the Constitution, January 9, 1788
- The Commonwealth of Massachusetts becomes the 6th state to ratify the Constitution, February 6, 1788
- The State of Maryland becomes the 7th state to ratify the Constitution, April 28, 1788
- The State of South Carolina becomes the 8th state to ratify the Constitution, May 23, 1788
- The Constitution takes effect when the State of New Hampshire becomes the 9th state to ratify the document, June 21, 1788
- The Commonwealth of Virginia becomes the 10th state to ratify the Constitution, June 25, 1788
- The State of New York becomes the 11th state to ratify the Constitution, July 26, 1788
- A new government under the Constitution is formed on March 4, 1789
- George Washington becomes the 1st president of the United States on April 30, 1789
- The State of North Carolina becomes the 12th state to ratify the Constitution, November 21, 1789
- The State of Rhode Island and Providence Plantations becomes the 13th state to ratify the Constitution, May 29, 1790
- The Vermont Republic is admitted to the Union as the State of Vermont (the 14th state) on March 4, 1791
- Whiskey Rebellion, 1791–1794
- The United States Bill of Rights, the first ten amendments to the Constitution, takes effect on December 15, 1791
- The United States sells the Erie Triangle to the Commonwealth of Pennsylvania, March 3, 1792
- The District of Kentucky of the Commonwealth of Virginia is admitted to the Union as the Commonwealth of Kentucky (the 15th state) on June 1, 1792
- The Eleventh Amendment to the United States Constitution takes effect, February 7, 1795
- The Territory South of the River Ohio is admitted to the Union as the State of Tennessee (the 16th state) on June 1, 1796
- John Adams becomes the 2nd president of the United States on March 4, 1797
- The Territory of Mississippi is organized, April 7, 1798
- Quasi-War, 1798–1800
- The Territory of Indiana is organized, May 7, 1800
- Thomas Jefferson becomes the 3rd president of the United States on March 4, 1801
- First Barbary War, 1801–1805
- The Territory Northwest of the River Ohio is admitted to the Union as the State of Ohio (the 17th state) on March 1, 1803
- The United States takes possession of the Louisiana Purchase, December 20, 1803
- Spain creates the colony of Alta California from northern portion of Las Californias, March 26, 1804 – August 24, 1821
- Lewis and Clark Expedition, May 14, 1804 – September 23, 1806
  - Lewis and Clark Expedition reaches the Pacific Ocean, November 18, 1805
- The Twelfth Amendment to the United States Constitution takes effect, June 15, 1804
- Battle of Sitka, October 1804
- The Territory of Orleans is organized and the District of Louisiana is created, October 1, 1804
- The Territory of Michigan is organized, June 30, 1805
- The Territory of Louisiana is organized, July 4, 1805
- Pike Expedition, July 15, 1806 – July 1, 1807
  - Spanish cavalry arrests Pike Expedition, February 26, 1807
- The Territory of Illinois is organized, March 1, 1809
- James Madison becomes the 4th president of the United States on March 4, 1809
- Mexican War of Independence, September 16, 1810 – August 24, 1821
  - Grito de Dolores on September 16, 1810
  - Treaty of Córdoba signed on August 24, 1821
- The Republic of West Florida declares its independence from Spain, September 23, 1810
- The United States unilaterally annexes the Florida Parishes of Spanish Florida Occidental, October 27, 1810
- Tecumseh's War, 1811
- A tremendous earthquake strikes the region around New Madrid in the Territory of Louisiana (Missouri), February 7, 1812
- The Territory of Orleans is admitted to the Union as the State of Louisiana (the 18th state) on April 30, 1812
- The Territory of Louisiana is renamed the Territory of Missouri on June 4, 1812
- War of 1812, June 18, 1812 – March 23, 1815
  - The United States declares war on the United Kingdom of Great Britain and Ireland on June 18, 1812
  - Battle of Lake Erie on September 10, 1813
  - Battle of Bladensburg on August 24, 1814
  - Burning of Washington on August 24, 1814
  - Battle of Plattsburgh, September 6–11, 1814
  - Battle of Baltimore, September 12–15, 1814
  - Treaty of Ghent signed on December 24, 1814
  - Battle of New Orleans on January 8, 1815
- Creek War, 1813–1814
- First Seminole War, 1814–1819
- Second Barbary War, March 3, 1815 – December 23, 1816
  - The United States declares war on Algiers, March 3, 1815
- The Territory of Indiana is admitted to the Union as the State of Indiana (the 19th state) on December 11, 1816
- The Territory of Alabama is organized, March 3, 1817
- James Monroe becomes the 5th president of the United States on March 4, 1817
- The Territory of Mississippi is admitted to the Union as the State of Mississippi (the 20th state) on December 10, 1817
- The Territory of Illinois is admitted to the Union as the State of Illinois (the 21st state) on December 3, 1818.
- The Territory of Arkansaw is organized, July 4, 1819
- The Territory of Alabama is admitted to the Union as the State of Alabama (the 22nd state) on December 14, 1819
- The District of Maine of the Commonwealth of Massachusetts is admitted to the Union as the State of Maine (the 23rd state) on March 15, 1820
- The Adams–Onís Treaty establishes the boundary between the United States and the Kingdom of Spain, February 22, 1821
- The southeastern portion of the Territory of Missouri is admitted to the Union as the State of Missouri (the 24th state) on August 10, 1821. The remainder of the Missouri Territory becomes unorganized.
- The Territory of Florida is organized, March 30, 1822
- The Russo-American Treaty establishes the boundary between Russian Alaska and the Oregon Country at the parallel 54°40′ north, January 12, 1825
- John Quincy Adams becomes the 6th president of the United States on March 4, 1825

==== 1826–1875 ====
- Winnebago War, 1827
- Andrew Jackson becomes the 7th president of the United States on March 4, 1829
- Nat Turner's slave rebellion, August 21–22, 1831
- Black Hawk War, 1832
- Second Seminole War, 1835–1842
- Toledo War, 1835–1836
- Texas Revolution, October 2, 1835 – October 2, 1836
  - Battle of the Alamo, February 23, 1836 – March 6, 1836
  - Texas Declaration of Independence, March 2, 1836
  - Battle of San Jacinto, April 21, 1836
- Texas-Indian Wars, May 19, 1836 – June 2, 1875
  - Fort Parker massacre, May 19, 1836
  - Council House massacre, March 19, 1840
- The Territory of Arkansaw is admitted to the Union as the State of Arkansas (the 25th state) on June 15, 1836
- The Territory of Wisconsin is organized, July 3, 1836
- The United States buys the Platte Purchase from the recently relocated Iowa, Sac, and Fox nations, September 17, 1836. The purchase includes the region east of the Missouri River, south of Sullivan Line, and west of the mouth of the Kaw (Kansas) River.
- The Territory of Michigan is admitted to the Union as the State of Michigan (the 26th state) on January 26, 1837
- Martin Van Buren becomes the 8th president of the United States on March 4, 1837
- The Platte Purchase is annexed to the State of Missouri, March 28, 1837
- Missouri Mormon War, August 6 – November 1, 1838
- The Territory of Iowa is organized, July 4, 1838
- Aroostook War, 1838–1839
- Honey War, 1839
- William Henry Harrison becomes the 9th president of the United States on March 4, 1841
- John Tyler becomes the 10th president of the United States upon the death of President William Henry Harrison on April 4, 1841
- The extralegal Provisional Government of Oregon governs the Oregon Country, May 2, 1843 – August 14, 1848
- Illinois Mormon War, June 7, 1844 – September 17, 1846
  - Assassination of Joseph Smith, Jr. on June 27, 1844
  - Battle of Nauvoo, September 12, 1846 – September 17, 1846
- Treaty of Wanghia, July 3, 1844
- The Territory of Florida is admitted to the Union as the State of Florida (the 27th state) on March 3, 1845
- James K. Polk becomes the 11th president of the United States on March 4, 1845
- The Republic of Texas is admitted to the Union as the State of Texas (the 28th state) on December 29, 1845
- Mexican–American War, April 23, 1846 – February 2, 1848
  - The United States declares war on Mexico, May 11, 1846
  - Treaty of Guadalupe Hidalgo signed on February 2, 1848
- Biddle Expedition arrives at Uraga Harbor in Japan, July 20, 1846
- The southeastern portion of the Territory of Iowa is admitted to the Union as the State of Iowa (the 29th state) on December 28, 1846. The remainder of the Iowa Territory becomes unorganized.
- Cayuse War, November 29, 1847 – June 11, 1855
  - Walla Walla Treaty, June 11, 1855
- The southeastern portion of the Territory of Wisconsin is admitted to the Union as the State of Wisconsin (the 30th state) on May 29, 1848. The remainder of the Wisconsin Territory becomes unorganized.
- The Territory of Oregon is organized, August 14, 1848
- The Territory of Minnesota is organized, March 3, 1849
- The extralegal State of Deseret governs the Great Basin region, May 3, 1849 – September 9, 1850
- Zachary Taylor becomes the 12th president of the United States on March 4, 1849
- Millard Fillmore becomes the 13th president of the United States upon the death of President Zachary Taylor on July 9, 1850
- The State of California is admitted to the Union as the 31st state on September 9, 1850
- The Territory of New Mexico and the Territory of Utah are organized, September 9, 1850
- The Territory of Washington is organized, February 8, 1853
- Franklin Pierce becomes the 14th president of the United States on March 4, 1853
- Perry Expedition arrives at Uraga Harbor in Japan, July 14, 1853
  - Convention of Kanagawa, March 31, 1854
- The Territory of Kansas and the Territory of Nebraska are organized, May 20, 1854
- Sioux Wars, August 19, 1854 – December 29, 1890
  - Grattan massacre, August 19, 1854
  - Wounded Knee Massacre, December 29, 1890
- James Buchanan becomes the 15th president of the United States on March 4, 1857
- Utah Mormon War, May 28, 1857 – July 8, 1858
  - Mountain Meadows massacre, September 11, 1857
- The eastern portion of the Territory of Minnesota is admitted to the Union as the State of Minnesota (the 32nd state) on May 11, 1858. The remainder of the Minnesota Territory becomes unorganized.
- The extralegal Territory of Jefferson governs the Southern Rocky Mountains region, October 24, 1859 – February 28, 1861
- The western portion of the Oregon Territory is admitted to the Union as the State of Oregon (the 33rd state) on February 14, 1859. The remainder of the Oregon Territory is annexed to the Washington Territory.
- The State of South Carolina becomes the 1st state to secede from the Union on December 20, 1860
- The State of Mississippi becomes the 2nd state to secede from the Union on January 9, 1861
- The State of Florida becomes the 3rd state to secede from the Union on January 10, 1861
- The State of Alabama becomes the 4th state to secede from the Union on January 11, 1861
- The State of Georgia becomes the 5th state to secede from the Union on January 19, 1861
- The State of Louisiana becomes the 6th state to secede from the Union on January 26, 1861
- The eastern portion of the Territory of Kansas is admitted to the Union as the State of Kansas (the 34th state) on January 29, 1861. The remainder of the Kansas territory becomes unorganized.
- The State of Texas becomes the 7th state to secede from the Union on February 1, 1861
- The 7 States of South Carolina, Mississippi, Florida, Alabama, Georgia, Louisiana, and Texas create the Confederate States of America on February 4, 1861
- The Territory of Colorado is organized, February 28, 1861
- The Territory of Nevada is organized, March 2, 1861
- The Territory of Dakota is organized, March 2, 1861
- Abraham Lincoln becomes the 16th president of the United States on March 4, 1861
- A rump government declares itself the Confederate Territory of Arizona on March 16, 1861
- American Civil War, April 12, 1861 – May 13, 1865
  - Battle of Fort Sumter, April 12, 1861 – April 13, 1861
  - The Commonwealth of Virginia becomes the 8th state to secede from the Union on April 17, 1861
  - Union naval blockade of the Confederacy, April 19, 1861 – April 9, 1865
  - The State of Arkansas becomes the 9th state to secede from the Union on May 6, 1861
  - The Commonwealth of Virginia becomes the 8th state admitted to the Confederacy on May 7, 1861
  - The State of North Carolina becomes the 10th state to secede from the Union on May 20, 1861
  - The State of Arkansas becomes the 9th state admitted to the Confederacy on May 18, 1861
  - The State of North Carolina becomes the 10th state admitted to the Confederacy on May 21, 1861
  - The State of Tennessee becomes the 11th state to secede from the Union on June 8, 1861
  - The State of Tennessee becomes the 11th state admitted to the Confederacy on July 2, 1861
  - First Battle of Bull Run, July 21, 1861
  - A rump government claiming to represent the State of Missouri declares its secession from the Union on October 31, 1861
  - A rump government claiming to represent the Commonwealth of Kentucky declares its secession from the Union on November 20, 1861
  - The rump government of the State of Missouri becomes the 12th state admitted to the Confederacy on November 28, 1861
  - The rump government of the Commonwealth of Kentucky becomes the 13th state admitted to the Confederacy on December 10, 1861
  - The rump government of the Confederate Territory of Arizona becomes the only Confederate Territory on February 14, 1862
  - Battle of Shiloh, April 6, 1862 – April 7, 1862
  - Battle of Antietam, September 17, 1862
  - The Territory of Arizona is organized, February 24, 1863
  - The Territory of Idaho is organized, March 4, 1863
  - Siege of Vicksburg, May 18, 1863 – July 4, 1863
  - The northwestern region of the Commonwealth of Virginia is admitted to the Union as the State of West Virginia (the 35th state) on June 20, 1863
  - Battle of Gettysburg, July 1, 1863 – July 3, 1863
  - President Lincoln issues the Emancipation Proclamation on September 22, 1863
  - Siege of Atlanta, May 7, 1864 – September 2, 1864
  - The Territory of Montana is organized, May 28, 1864
  - The State of Nevada is admitted to the Union as the 36th state on October 31, 1864
  - Battle of Appomattox Courthouse, April 9, 1865
  - Assassination of President Abraham Lincoln in Washington, D.C., on April 14, 1865
    - President Abraham Lincoln dies on April 15, 1865
    - Andrew Johnson becomes 17th president of the United States on April 15, 1865
- The Thirteenth Amendment to the United States Constitution takes effect, December 18, 1865
- The State of Tennessee becomes the 1st Confederate State readmitted to the Union on July 24, 1866
- The Territory of Nebraska is admitted to the Union as the State of Nebraska (the 37th state) on March 1, 1867
- President Andrew Johnson is impeached by the United States House of Representatives, February 24, 1868
  - President Andrew Johnson is acquitted by the United States Senate, May 16, 1868
- The State of Arkansas becomes the 2nd Confederate State readmitted to the Union on June 22, 1868
- The State of Florida becomes the 3rd Confederate State readmitted to the Union on June 25, 1868
- The State of North Carolina becomes the 4th Confederate State readmitted to the Union on July 4, 1868
- The Fourteenth Amendment to the United States Constitution takes effect, July 9, 1868
- The State of Louisiana becomes the 5th Confederate State readmitted to the Union on July 9, 1868
- The State of South Carolina becomes the 6th Confederate State readmitted to the Union on July 9, 1868
- The State of Alabama becomes the 7th Confederate State readmitted to the Union on July 13, 1868
- The Territory of Wyoming is organized, July 25, 1868
- Ulysses S. Grant becomes the 18th president of the United States on March 4, 1869
- The Transcontinental railroad is completed on May 10, 1869
- The Commonwealth of Virginia becomes the 8th Confederate State readmitted to the Union on January 26, 1870
- The Fifteenth Amendment to the United States Constitution, February 3, 1870
- The State of Mississippi becomes the 9th Confederate State readmitted to the Union on February 23, 1870
- The State of Texas becomes the 10th Confederate State readmitted to the Union on March 30, 1870
- The State of Georgia becomes the 11th and last Confederate State readmitted to the Union on July 15, 1870
- The United States attacks Korea, June 10, 1871 – July 3, 1871

==== 1876–1925 ====
- Black Hills War, March 17, 1876 – 1877
  - Battle of the Little Bighorn, June 25, 1876 – June 26, 1876
- The nation celebrates the Centennial of the United States of America despite news from the Little Bighorn, July 4, 1876
- The Territory of Colorado is admitted to the Union as the State of Colorado (the 38th state) on August 1, 1876
- Rutherford B. Hayes becomes the 19th president of the United States on March 4, 1877
- James A. Garfield becomes the 20th president of the United States on March 4, 1881
- Chester A. Arthur becomes the 21st president of the United States upon the assassination of President James Garfield on September 19, 1881
- The portion of the Dakota Territory south of the 42nd parallel north and west of the Missouri River is annexed to the State of Nebraska, March 28, 1882
- Grover Cleveland becomes the 22nd president of the United States on March 4, 1885
- Benjamin Harrison becomes the 23rd president of the United States on March 4, 1889
- The Territory of Dakota is admitted to the Union as the State of North Dakota and the State of South Dakota (the 39th state and the 40th state) on November 2, 1889
- The Territory of Montana is admitted to the Union as the State of Montana (the 41st state) on November 8, 1889
- The Territory of Washington is admitted to the Union as the State of Washington (the 42nd state) on November 11, 1889
- The Territory of Oklahoma is organized, May 2, 1890
- The Territory of Idaho is admitted to the Union as the State of Idaho (the 43rd state) on July 3, 1890
- The Territory of Wyoming is admitted to the Union as the State of Wyoming (the 44th state) on July 10, 1890
- Grover Cleveland becomes the 24th (as well as the 22nd) president of the United States on March 4, 1893
- The Territory of Utah is admitted to the Union as the State of Utah (the 45th state) on January 4, 1896
- William McKinley becomes the 25th president of the United States on March 4, 1897
- Spanish–American War, April 23 – August 12, 1898
  - Teller Amendment blocks United States annexation of Cuba, April 20, 1898
  - The Spanish Empire declares war on the United States, April 23, 1898
  - Invasion of Guantánamo Bay, June 6, 1898 – June 10, 1898
  - Capture of Guam, June 20, 1898 – June 21, 1898
  - Battle of Santiago de Cuba, July 3, 1898
  - Invasion of Puerto Rico, July 25, 1898 – August 13, 1898
  - Protocol of Peace signed on August 12, 1898
  - Treaty of Paris, December 10, 1898
    - The United States annexes the Philippines, Porto Rico (sic), and Guam, December 10, 1898
    - The United States formally occupies Cuba, January 1, 1899 – May 20, 1902
  - Platt Amendment promotes United States hegemony of Cuba, March 2, 1901
- The Territory of Hawaii is organized, July 7, 1898
- Second Samoan Civil War, August 22, 1898 – November 14, 1899
  - Anglo-German Samoa Convention, November 14, 1899
    - The United States annexes Eastern Samoa, December 2, 1899
- Philippine–American War, June 2, 1899 – June 15, 1913
  - Philippine Declaration of Independence, June 12, 1898
  - The Philippines declares war on the United States, June 2, 1899
  - Moro Rebellion, May 2, 1902 – June 15, 1913
  - Organic Act for the Philippine Islands, July 1, 1902
  - President Theodore Roosevelt declares the end of Philippine–American War, July 4, 1902
- Boxer Rebellion, November 2, 1899 – September 7, 1901
  - The Society of Right and Harmonious Fists attacks Beijing, June 20, 1900
  - The Eight-Nation Alliance relieves Beijing, August 14, 1900
  - The Boxer Protocol is imposed on China, September 7, 1901
- A hurricane strikes Galveston, Texas, killing approximately 8,000 people, September 8, 1900
- Theodore Roosevelt becomes the 26th president of the United States upon the assassination of President William McKinley on September 14, 1901
- The United States recognizes the independence of the Republic of Cuba, May 20, 1902
  - The United States formally ends its occupation of Cuba, May 20, 1902
- The United States seizes opportunity to build a ship canal across the Isthmus of Panama, January 22, 1903 – August 15, 1914
  - The United States and the Republic of Colombia sign the Hay–Herrán Treaty, January 22, 1903
  - The Congress of Colombia rejects the Hay–Herrán Treaty, August 12, 1903
  - The United States Navy patrol gunboat USS Nashville blocks Colombian attempts to suppress a Panamanian separatist movement, October 26, 1903 – March 4, 1904
  - The Republic of Panama declares its independence from the Republic of Colombia, November 3, 1903
  - United States Marines occupy region around proposed canal, November 4, 1903 – January 21, 1914
  - The United States and the Republic of Panama sign the Hay–Bunau-Varilla Treaty, November 18, 1903
    - The United States annexes the Panama Canal Zone, November 18, 1903
- A tremendous earthquake strikes the San Francisco region, April 18, 1906
- The United States reoccupies Cuba, September 29, 1906 – January 28, 1909
- The Territory of Oklahoma is admitted to the Union as the State of Oklahoma (the 46th state) on November 16, 1907
- William Howard Taft becomes the 27th president of the United States on March 4, 1909
- The Territory of New Mexico is admitted to the Union as the State of New Mexico (the 47th state) on January 6, 1912
- The Territory of Arizona is admitted to the Union as the State of Arizona (the 48th state) on February 14, 1912
- The District of Alaska is reorganized as the Territory of Alaska, August 24, 1912
- The Sixteenth Amendment to the United States Constitution takes effect, February 3, 1913
- Woodrow Wilson becomes the 28th president of the United States on March 4, 1913
- The Seventeenth Amendment to the United States Constitution takes effect, April 8, 1913
- The United States occupation of Veracruz, April 21, 1914 – November 23, 1914
- The Panama Canal opens to shipping, August 15, 1914
- The United States occupation of Haiti, July 28, 1915 – August 11, 1934
- Doroteo Arango Arámbula (Pancho Villa) orders raid on Columbus, New Mexico, March 9, 1916
- General John Pershing leads Mexican Expedition, March 14, 1916 – February 7, 1917
- The United States occupation of the Dominican Republic, May 16, 1916 – July 13, 1924
- The United States purchases the Danish West Indies from Denmark, January 17, 1917
- World War I, June 28, 1914 – November 11, 1918
  - The United States declares war on the German Reich, April 6, 1917
  - Armistice with Germany, November 11, 1918
  - The Treaty of Versailles and the Covenant of the League of Nations are signed, June 28, 1919
  - The United States Senate rejects the Treaty of Versailles primarily because of Article X of the Covenant of the League of Nations, March 20, 1920
  - The United States Congress declares end of war, July 2, 1921
- Allied intervention in the Russian Civil War, May 26, 1918 – April 1, 1920
  - The American Expeditionary Force Siberia, August 15, 1918 – April 1, 1920
  - The American Expeditionary Force North Russia, September 4, 1918 – August 5, 1919
- The Eighteenth Amendment to the United States Constitution takes effect, January 29, 1919
- The Nineteenth Amendment to the United States Constitution takes effect, August 18, 1920
- Warren G. Harding becomes the 29th president of the United States on March 4, 1921
- Calvin Coolidge becomes the 30th president of the United States upon the death of President Warren Harding on August 2, 1923

==== 1926–1975 ====
- Hurricane San Felipe Segundo strikes the Leeward Islands, Puerto Rico, the Bahamas, and Florida killing more than 4,000 people, September 6, 1928 – September 20, 1928
- Herbert Hoover becomes the 31st president of the United States on March 4, 1929
- Great Depression, September 3, 1929 – September 1, 1939
  - Wall Street Crash, September 3, 1929 – July 8, 1932
    - Black Tuesday, October 29, 1929
- The Twentieth Amendment to the United States Constitution is ratified, January 23, 1933
- Franklin D. Roosevelt becomes the 32nd president of the United States on March 4, 1933
- The Eighteenth Amendment to the United States Constitution is repealed by the Twenty-first Amendment to the United States Constitution, December 5, 1933
- The United States assumes the defense of Greenland (Kalaallit Nunaat), April 9, 1941 – 1946
- The United States assumes the defense of Iceland, July 27, 1941 – 1946
- The United States and Brazil assume the defense of Surinam, November 24, 1941 – 1946
- World War II, September 1, 1939 – September 2, 1945
  - The Empire of Japan invades Manchuria, September 19, 1931
  - The Italian Empire invades Ethiopia, October 3, 1935
  - The German Reich invades Poland, September 1, 1939
  - The Empire of Japan attacks Pearl Harbor, December 7, 1941
  - The United States declares war on the Empire of Japan, December 8, 1941
  - The German Reich declares war on the United States, December 11, 1941
  - The United States declares war on the German Reich and the Italian Empire, December 11, 1941
  - Aleutian Islands Campaign, June 3, 1942 – August 15, 1943
  - The United States declares war on Bulgaria, Hungary, and Romania, June 5, 1942
  - Allied Forces invade Sicily, July 9, 1943
  - Allied Forces invade Italy, September 3, 1943
  - Italy secretly signs an armistice with Allied Forces, September 3, 1943
  - Allied Forces invade Normandy, June 6, 1944
  - Japan launches Fu-Go balloon bombs into the northwestern United States, November 3, 1944 – April 15, 1945
  - Allied Forces invade Okinawa, March 18, 1945
  - German Instrument of Surrender signed May 7 and 8, 1945
  - The United States tests the first atomic bomb at the Trinity Site in New Mexico, July 16, 1945
  - The United States drops an atomic bomb on Hiroshima, August 6, 1945
  - The United States drops an atomic bomb on Nagasaki, August 9, 1945
  - Japanese Instrument of Surrender signed September 2, 1945
- Harry S. Truman becomes the 33rd president of the United States upon the death of President Franklin Roosevelt on April 12, 1945
- The United States and 50 other nations form the United Nations, October 24, 1945
- The League of Nations ceases operation, April 20, 1946
- Cold War, March 5, 1946 – December 25, 1991
  - Berlin Blockade, June 24, 1948 – May 11, 1949
    - Berlin Airlift, June 25, 1948 – September 30, 1949
- Korean War, June 25, 1950 – July 27, 1953
  - North Korea invades South Korea, June 25, 1950
  - The United Nations invade North Korea, September 15, 1950
  - China invades North Korea, November 1, 1950
  - China invades South Korea, January 1, 1951
  - Korean Armistice Agreement signed July 27, 1953
- The Twenty-second Amendment to the United States Constitution takes effect, February 27, 1951
- Dwight D. Eisenhower becomes the 34th president of the United States on January 20, 1953
- The Territory of Alaska is admitted to the Union as the State of Alaska (the 49th state) on January 3, 1959
- Vietnam War, September 26, 1959 – April 30, 1975
  - The United States sends military advisors to the Republic of Vietnam, February 12, 1955
  - The United States and the Vietnam People's Army wage covert war in Laos, October 1962 – 1975
  - The United States begins bombing the Democratic Republic of Vietnam, August 2, 1964
  - The United States sends regular ground troops to the Republic of Vietnam, March 8, 1965
  - Battle of Khe Sanh, January 21 – April 8, 1968
  - Tet Offensive, January 30 – September 23, 1968
    - Battle of Hue, January 30 – March 3, 1968
  - The United States covertly bombs Vietnam People's Army military targets in Cambodia, 1968–1970
  - Battle of Hamburger Hill, May 10–20, 1969
  - The United States and the Army of the Republic of Vietnam invade Cambodia, April 29 – July 22, 1970
  - Paris Peace Accords, January 27, 1973
  - The United States removes regular ground troops from the Republic of Vietnam, March 27, 1973
  - Fall of Saigon, April 30, 1975
- The Territory of Hawaii is admitted to the Union as the State of Hawaiʻi (the 50th state) on August 21, 1959
- Cuba confiscates property of United States companies and citizens, July 5, 1960
- John F. Kennedy becomes the 35th president of the United States on January 20, 1961
- The Twenty-third Amendment to the United States Constitution takes effect, March 29, 1961
- Cuban exiles supported by the United States invade Cuba, April 17–19, 1961
- United States embargo against Cuba, since February 7, 1962
- Cuban Missile Crisis, October 15–28, 1962
  - United States naval quarantine of Cuba, October 24 – December 31, 1962
- Lyndon B. Johnson becomes the 36th president of the United States upon the assassination of President John Kennedy on November 22, 1963
- The Twenty-fourth Amendment to the United States Constitution takes effect, January 23, 1964
- A tremendous earthquake strikes the region around Anchorage, Alaska, on Good Friday, March 27, 1964
- The United States and allies invade the Dominican Republic, April 28, 1965 – September 1966
- The Twenty-fifth Amendment to the United States Constitution is ratified, February 10, 1967
- Richard Nixon becomes the 37th president of the United States on January 20, 1969
- Neil Armstrong and Buzz Aldrin are first people to walk on the Moon, July 20–21, 1969
- The Twenty-sixth Amendment to the United States Constitution takes effect, July 1, 1971
- Eugene Cernan and Harrison Schmitt are the last Apollo astronauts to walk on the Moon, December 11–14, 1972
- The United States airlifts military supplies to Israel during the Yom Kippur War, October 12 – November 14, 1973
- Gerald Ford becomes the 38th president of the United States upon the resignation of President Richard Nixon on August 9, 1974

==== 1976–2025 ====
- The nation celebrates the Bicentennial of the United States of America, July 4, 1976
- Jimmy Carter becomes the 39th president of the United States on January 20, 1977
- Iran hostage crisis, November 4, 1979 – January 20, 1981
- The United States transfers sovereignty of the Panama Canal Zone back to the Republic of Panama, October 1, 1979
- Mount St. Helens erupts, May 18, 1980
- Ronald Reagan becomes the 40th president of the United States on January 20, 1981
- The United States joins Multinational Force in Lebanon, August 29, 1982 – February 26, 1984
  - Truck bombings kill 307 in Beirut, October 23, 1983
- The United States invades Grenada, October 25 – December 15, 1983
- The United States pursues the Strategic Defense Initiative, March 27, 1984 – May 13, 1993
  - President Ronald Reagan presents Star Wars speech, March 23, 1983
- Black Monday, October 19, 1987
- Somali Civil War, since 1988
  - The United Nations intervenes in the Somali Civil War, July 27, 1992 – March 3, 1995
    - The United States leads the Unified Task Force, December 9, 1992 – May 4, 1993
    - The United States deploys independent Task Force Ranger, August 8, 1993 – March 31, 1994
      - Battle of Mogadishu, October 3–4, 1993
- George H. W. Bush becomes the 41st president of the United States on January 20, 1989
- The United States invades Panama, December 20, 1989 – February 13, 1990
- Persian Gulf War, August 2, 1990 – February 28, 1991
  - The Republic of Iraq invades the State of Kuwait, August 2, 1990
  - The United States and allies invade Kuwait and Iraq, February 24, 1991
- The United States and allies enforce a no-fly zone over Iraq north of the 36th parallel north, April 7, 1991 – December 31, 1996
- War in Bosnia and Herzegovina, April 1, 1992 – December 14, 1995
  - The United Nations airlifts humanitarian aid to Bosnia and Hercegovina, July 2, 1992 – January 9, 1996
  - NATO enforces ban on unauthorized military flights over Bosnia and Hercegovina, April 13, 1993 – August 30, 1995
  - NATO bombs Bosnian Serb Army in Bosnia and Herzegovina, August 30 – September 20, 1995
- The Twenty-seventh Amendment to the United States Constitution takes effect, May 5, 1992
- The United States and allies enforce a no-fly zone over Iraq south of the 32nd parallel north, August 27, 1992 – September 4, 1996
- Bill Clinton becomes the 42nd president of the United States on January 20, 1993
- The United States contributes troops for United Nations peacekeeping in Macedonia, July 9, 1993 –
- The United States and allies invade Haiti, September 19, 1994 – March 31, 1995
- Dot-com bubble, January 4, 1995 – March 10, 2000
- Kosovo War, April 22, 1996 – June 11, 1999
  - NATO bombs the Federal Republic of Yugoslavia, March 24 – June 10, 1999
- The United States and allies enforce an expanded no-fly zone over Iraq south of the 33rd parallel north, September 4, 1996 – April 30, 2003
- Al-Qaeda simultaneously bombs United States embassies in Dar es Salaam, Tanzania, and Nairobi, Kenya, August 7, 1998. The car bombs kill 223 people and injure more than 4000.
- The United States and the United Kingdom bomb Iraq, December 16, 1998 – December 19, 1998
- The United States House of Representatives impeaches President Bill Clinton, December 19, 1998
  - The United States Senate acquits President Bill Clinton, February 12, 1999
- The United States transfers ownership of the Panama Canal to the Republic of Panama, December 31, 1999
- Dot-com collapse on March 10, 2000 – October 10, 2002.
- United States housing bubble, 2000–2006.
- Al-Qaeda attack on the USS Cole at Aden in Yemen on October 12, 2000.
- George W. Bush becomes the 43rd president of the United States on January 20, 2001.
- Al-Qaeda performs the September 11 attacks, marking the start of the war on terror on September 11, 2001.
- War in Afghanistan, October 7, 2001 – August 30, 2021.
  - The United States and allies invade Afghanistan on October 7, 2001.
  - The War in Afghanistan ended with the remaining troops leaving the country on August 30, 2021.
- President George W. Bush declares Iran, Iraq, and North Korea to be the "Axis of Evil" on January 29, 2002.
- Iraq War, March 20, 2003 – December 15, 2011.
  - The United States and allies invade Iraq on March 20, 2003.
  - The Iraq War is declared formally over on December 15, 2011.
- Hurricane Katrina strikes Florida on August 25 and Louisiana and Mississippi on August 29, 2005. Subsequent failure of drainage canals floods 80% of New Orleans.
- United States housing collapse since 2006.
- 2008 financial crisis.
- Barack Obama becomes the 44th president of the United States on January 20, 2009.
- Tea Party movement begins in 2009.
- Citizens United, a landmark decision of the Supreme Court overturning restrictions on corporate political spending in 2010.
- Protesters Occupy Wall Street in 2011.
- The United States and allies enforce no-fly zone over Libya during the Libyan civil war, March 19, 2011 – October 31, 2011.
- Osama bin Laden, the leader of al-Qaeda and the mastermind of the September 11 attacks, is killed in Pakistan by Navy SEALs on May 2, 2011.
- Obergefell v. Hodges, a landmark decision of the Supreme Court legalizing same-sex marriage in 2015.
- Donald Trump becomes the 45th president of the United States on January 20, 2017.
- The COVID-19 pandemic shuts down most businesses and activities, arriving on January 13, 2020.
- Protests against police brutality spread throughout the nation after the killing of George Floyd on May 25, 2020.
- Following the 2020 United States Presidential Election, a pro-Trump mob attacks the United States Capitol on January 6, 2021.
- Joe Biden becomes the 46th president of the United States on January 20, 2021.
- The War in Afghanistan ends following the troop withdrawal from Afghanistan, ending the war on terror on August 30, 2021.
- The United States supports Israel during the Gaza war and genocide, resulting in the Columbia University encampment and subsequent university protests across the country starting on April 17, 2024.
- Donald Trump becomes the 47th president of the United States on January 20, 2025.

==== 2026–present ====
- Donald Trump invades Venezuela and kidnaps president Nicolás Maduro on January 3, 2026.
- ICE agents shoot and kill Renée Good and Alex Pretti, sparking national protests in January 2026.
- Donald Trump begins the Iran war on February 28, 2026.

== By region ==
- American Old West
- Confederate States of America
- History of New England
- History of the Southern United States
- History of the west coast of North America

States

- History of Alabama
- History of Alaska
- History of Arizona
- History of Arkansas
- History of California
- History of Colorado
- History of Connecticut
- History of Delaware
- History of Florida
- History of Georgia
- History of Hawaii
- History of Idaho
- History of Illinois
- History of Indiana
- History of Iowa
- History of Kansas
- History of Kentucky
- History of Louisiana
- History of Maine
- History of Maryland
- History of Massachusetts
- History of Michigan
- History of Minnesota
- History of Mississippi
- History of Missouri
- History of Montana
- History of Nebraska
- History of Nevada
- History of New Hampshire
- History of New Jersey
- History of New Mexico
- History of New York
- History of North Carolina
- History of North Dakota
- History of Ohio
- History of Oklahoma
- History of Oregon
- History of Pennsylvania
- History of Rhode Island
- History of South Carolina
- History of South Dakota
- History of Tennessee
- History of Texas
- History of Utah
- History of Vermont
- History of Virginia
- History of Washington
- History of West Virginia
- History of Wisconsin
- History of Wyoming

Federal district

- History of Washington, D.C.

Insular areas

- History of American Samoa
- History of Guam
- History of the Northern Mariana Islands
- History of Puerto Rico
- History of the U.S. Virgin Islands

Outlying islands

- History of Bajo Nuevo Bank
- History of Baker Island
- History of Howland Island
- History of Jarvis Island
- History of Johnston Atoll
- History of Kingman Reef
- History of Midway Atoll
- History of Navassa Island
- History of Palmyra Atoll
- History of Serranilla Bank
- History of Wake Island

== By subject ==
=== History books ===
Books on the history of the United States:

- A History of Money and Banking in the United States
- A Monetary History of the United States
- A Patriot's History of the United States
- A People's History of the United States
- Cyclopaedia of Political Science, Political Economy, and the Political History of the United States
- Land of Promise: An Economic History of the United States
- The History of the United States of America 1801–1817
- Oxford History of the United States
- The Penguin History of the United States of America
- Voices of a People's History of the United States

=== Cultural history of the United States ===
- Cultural history of the United States
  - History of immigration to the United States
  - Music history of the United States
    - Music history of the United States during the colonial era
    - Music history of the United States to the Civil War
    - Music of the American Civil War
    - Music history of the United States in the late 19th century
    - Music history of the United States (1900–1940)
    - Music history of the United States in the 1950s
    - Music history of the United States in the 1960s
    - Music history of the United States in the 1970s
    - Music history of the United States in the 1980s
  - History of people in the United States
    - African-American history
    - History of Asian Americans
      - History of Chinese Americans
      - History of Japanese Americans
      - Military history of Asian Americans
    - History of disability rights in the United States
      - Timeline of disability rights in the United States
    - History of Hispanic and Latino Americans
      - History of Mexican Americans
    - History of the Jews in the United States
      - History of antisemitism in the United States
      - History of Jewish education in the United States before the 20th century
    - LGBT history in the United States
      - Bisexuality in the United States
      - History of gay men in the United States
      - History of lesbianism in the United States
      - Transgender history in the United States
      - History of violence against LGBT people in the United States
    - History of Native Americans in the United States
    - History of Filipino nurses in the United States
    - History of the Poles in the United States
    - History of women in the United States
      - History of lesbianism in the United States
      - Women's suffrage in the United States
    - History of youth in the United States
      - History of youth rights in the United States
      - Timeline of young people's rights in the United States
  - History of religion in the United States
    - History of Christianity in the United States
      - History of the Latter Day Saint movement
      - History of Roman Catholicism in the United States
        - History of the Catholic Church in the United States
          - 19th-century history of the Catholic Church in the United States
          - 20th-century history of the Catholic Church in the United States
      - History of Protestantism in the United States
        - History of the Episcopal Church (United States)
        - History of Methodism in the United States
  - History of sports in the United States
    - History of baseball in the United States
    - History of basketball
    - History of United States cricket
    - History of American football
    - History of golf in the United States
    - History of ice hockey in the United States
      - History of the National Hockey League on United States television
      - History of women's ice hockey in the United States
    - United States at the Olympics
    - History of rugby union in the United States
      - History of rugby union matches between Canada and the United States
      - History of rugby union matches between Ireland and the United States
    - History of soccer in the United States
      - History of the United States men's national soccer team
    - History of professional wrestling in the United States
  - History of time in the United States
  - History of American cuisine
    - History of the hamburger in the United States
  - Architecture of the United States
    - History of fountains in the United States

=== Economic history of the United States ===
- Economic history of the United States
  - History of tariffs in the United States
  - History of banking in the United States
    - History of central banking in the United States
    - History of investment banking in the United States
  - Industrial history of the United States
    - History of agriculture in the United States
      - History of commercial tobacco in the United States
      - Early history of food regulation in the United States
      - History of the lumber industry in the United States
        - History of the United States Forest Service
        - History of wildfire suppression in the United States
    - History of energy in the United States
      - History of coal mining in the United States
      - History of the petroleum industry in the United States
    - History of transport in the United States
      - History of rail transport in the United States
      - History of street lighting in the United States
      - History of turnpikes and canals in the United States
      - History of the trucking industry in the United States
  - Labor history of the United States
  - History of monetary policy in the United States
  - History of the United States public debt
    - History of the United States debt ceiling
  - History of United States–Middle East economic relations
  - Numismatic history of the United States (currency)
    - History of the United States dollar
  - Recessions in the United States
  - List of disasters in the United States by death toll
    - List of natural disasters in the United States
    - History of hotel fires in the United States

=== History of education in the United States ===
- History of education in the United States
  - Bibliography of the history of education in the United States
  - History of Catholic education in the United States
  - History of deaf education in the United States

=== Geographic history of the United States ===
- Demographic history of the United States
- Geologic history of the United States
- Territorial evolution of the United States

=== History of health care in the United States ===
- History of medicine in the United States
- History of health care reform in the United States

=== Historiography of the United States ===
- Historiography of the United States

=== Maritime history of the United States ===
- Maritime history of the United States (1776–1799)
- Maritime history of the United States (1800–1899)
- Maritime history of the United States (1900–1999)
- Maritime history of the United States (2000–present)

=== Political history of the United States ===
- Physical history of the United States Declaration of Independence
- History of the United States Constitution
- History of the United States government
  - Presidents of the United States
    - George Washington: 1789–1797
    - John Adams: 1797–1801
    - Thomas Jefferson: 1801–1809
    - James Madison: 1809–1817
    - James Monroe: 1817–1825
    - John Quincy Adams: 1825–1829
    - Andrew Jackson: 1829–1837
    - Martin Van Buren: 1837–1841
    - William Henry Harrison: 1841
    - John Tyler: 1841–1845
    - James K. Polk: 1845–1849
    - Zachary Taylor: 1849–1850
    - Millard Fillmore: 1850–1853
    - Franklin Pierce: 1853–1857
    - James Buchanan: 1857–1861
    - Abraham Lincoln: 1861–1865
    - Andrew Johnson: 1865–1869
    - Ulysses S. Grant: 1869–1877
    - Rutherford B. Hayes: 1877–1881
    - James A. Garfield: 1881
    - Chester A. Arthur: 1881–1885
    - Grover Cleveland: 1885–1889
    - Benjamin Harrison: 1889–1893
    - Grover Cleveland: 1893–1897
    - William McKinley: 1897–1901
    - Theodore Roosevelt: 1901–1909
    - William H. Taft: 1909–1913
    - Woodrow Wilson: 1913–1921
    - Warren Harding: 1921–1923
    - Calvin Coolidge: 1923–1929
    - Herbert Hoover: 1929–1933
    - Franklin D. Roosevelt: 1933–1945
    - Harry S. Truman: 1945–1953
    - Dwight D. Eisenhower: 1953–1961
    - John F. Kennedy: 1961–1963
    - Lyndon B. Johnson: 1963–1969
    - Richard M. Nixon: 1969–1974
    - Gerald Ford: 1974–1977
    - Jimmy Carter: 1977–1981
    - Ronald Reagan: 1981–1989
    - George H. W. Bush: 1989–1993
    - Bill Clinton: 1993–2001
    - George W. Bush: 2001–2009
    - Barack Obama: 2009–2017
    - Donald Trump: 2017–2021
    - Joe Biden: 2021–2025
    - Donald Trump: 2025–present
  - History of the United States Congress
    - History of the United States House of Representatives
    - History of the United States Senate
  - History of the Supreme Court of the United States
  - History of the United States National Security Council
  - Postage stamps and postal history of the United States
    - History of United States postage rates
  - History of the flags of the United States
- History of homeland security in the United States
- History of United States foreign policy
  - Diplomatic history of the United States
    - History of United States diplomatic relations by country
  - United States treaties
- Labor history of the United States
  - History of union busting in the United States
  - History of cooperatives in the United States
- History of law in the United States
  - History of United States antitrust law
  - History of bankruptcy law in the United States
  - History of civil rights in the United States
    - Civil rights movement (1896–1954)
    - Civil rights movement
    - Timeline of civil marriage in the United States
  - History of United States drug prohibition
    - Legal history of cannabis in the United States
  - History of laws concerning immigration and naturalization in the United States
  - Legal history of income tax in the United States
  - History of labor law in the United States
  - History of United States patent law
  - History of United States prison systems
- Military history of the United States
  - List of United States military history events
    - Conflicts in the United States
    - List of wars involving the United States
      - List of 17th-century wars involving the Thirteen Colonies
      - List of 18th-century wars involving the Thirteen Colonies
      - List of wars involving the United States in the 18th century
      - List of wars involving the United States in the 19th century (1801-1850)
      - List of wars involving the United States in the 19th century (1851-1900)
      - List of wars involving the United States in the 20th century
      - List of wars involving the United States in the 21st century
  - Military history of the United States during World War II
  - History of the branches of the United States military
    - History of the United States Air Force
    - History of the United States Army
      - History of the United States Army Special Forces
    - History of the United States Coast Guard
    - History of the United States Marine Corps
    - History of the United States Navy
      - History of United States Naval Operations in World War II (book series)
    - History of the United States Merchant Marine
    - History of United States Navy ratings
  - History of civil affairs in the United States Armed Forces
  - History of the United States Military Academy
  - History of military nutrition in the United States
  - History of segregation in the United States Armed Forces
- Nuclear history of the United States
- History of United States political parties
  - History of the United States Democratic Party
  - History of the Green Party of the United States
  - History of the Libertarian Party (United States)
    - Electoral history of the Libertarian Party (United States)
  - History of the United States Republican Party
  - Electoral history of the Constitution Party (United States)
- History of lobbying in the United States
- Social class in American history
- History of Social Security in the United States
- History of the socialist movement in the United States
- History of direct democracy in the United States
- History of conservatism in the United States
- History of left-wing politics in the United States
- History of ethnocultural politics in the United States

=== History of science in the United States ===
- History of science in the United States
- History of paleontology in the United States

== See also ==
- Index of United States–related articles
- List of presidents of the United States
- Outline of the United States
- Timeline of country and capital changes
