= Hugh Brogan =

British historian and biographer (1936–2019)

Denis Hugh Vercingetorix Brogan (20 March 1936 – 26 July 2019) known as Hugh Brogan, was a British historian and biographer.

== Early life ==
The son of Sir Denis Brogan and Olwen Phillis Francis (Lady Brogan), OBE, archaeologist and authority on Roman Libya, he was educated at St Faith's School, Cambridge, Repton School, and St John's College, Cambridge, graduating BA in 1959 and MA in 1964. From his schooldays, he was a frequent correspondent of J.R.R. Tolkien regarding the latter's works. The Letters of J. R. R. Tolkien published in 1981 includes five addressed to Brogan; these are dated 7 April 1948, Christmas 1948, 18 September 1954, 11 September 1955, and 14 December 1955. A draft of an unsent letter addressed to Brogan is also included.

== Career ==
Brogan was on the staff of The Economist from 1960 to 1963, and was elected a Harkness Fellow in 1962, then was a fellow of St John's College, Cambridge, from 1963 to 1974. He was then part of the department of history at the University of Essex from 1974 to 1998, first as a lecturer, then a reader, and finally as Professor of History from 1992 to 1998.

== Major publications ==
- Tocqueville (1973)
- The Times Reports The American Civil War (1975)
- The Life of Arthur Ransome (1984)
- The Longman History of the United States of America (1985); reprinted as The Penguin History of the United States of America (1990)
- Mowgli's Sons: Kipling and Baden-Powell's Scouts (1987)
- Correspondance et Conversations d'Alexis de Tocqueville et Nassau William Senior, (1991, with Anne P. Kerr)
- American Presidential Families [with Charles Mosley] (1993)
- Kennedy (1996)
- Signalling from Mars: The Letters of Arthur Ransome (1997, ed.)
- Alexis de Tocqueville: Prophet of Democracy in the Age of Revolution (UK: Profile, 2006); Alexis de Tocqueville: A Life (USA: Yale University Press, 2007)
