= Timeline of the history of the United States (1990–2009) =

This section of the timeline of United States history includes major events from 1990 to 2009.

== 1990s ==
=== Presidency of George H. W. Bush ===
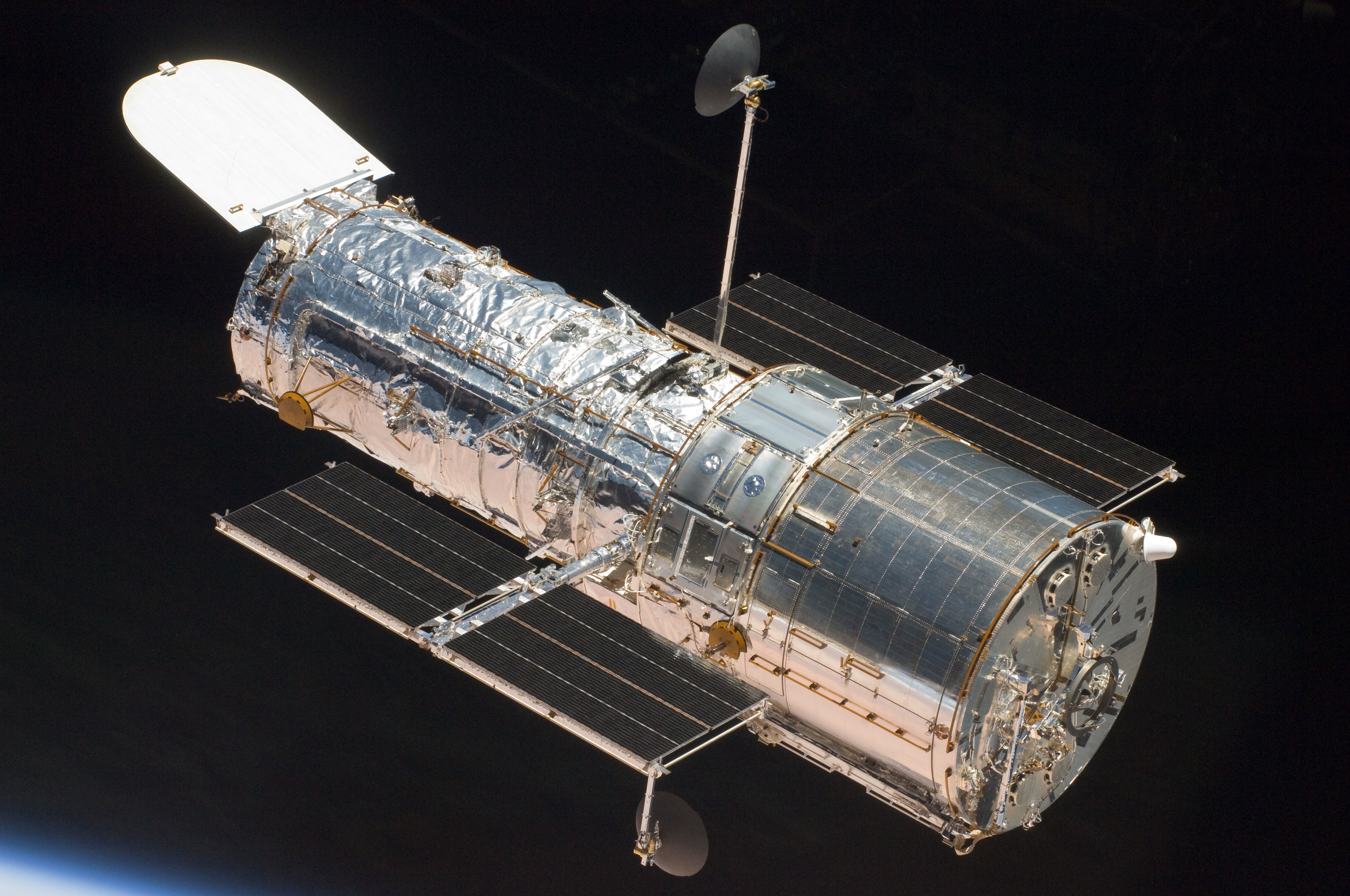
- Hubble Space Telescope
  1990 — Hubble Space Telescope launches during STS-31, a Space Shuttle Discovery mission.
- 1991 — The Gulf War is waged in the Middle East, by a U.N.-authorized coalition force from thirty-four nations, led by the U.S. and United Kingdom, against Iraq.
- 1991 — The World Wide Web first debuts as an Internet service.
- 1991 — The Cold War ends as the USSR is dissolved. The United States becomes the only superpower in the world.
- 1992 — Los Angeles riots result in over 60 deaths and $1 billion in damage, spurred by the acquittal of four Los Angeles Police Department officers accused in the videotaped beating of black motorist Rodney King.
- 1992 — Hurricane Andrew, a Category 5 hurricane, kills 65 people and causes $26 billion in damage to Florida and other areas of the U.S. Gulf Coast, and will be the costliest natural disaster until Hurricane Katrina in 2005.
- 1992 — Hurricane Iniki is the strongest hurricane ever to hit Hawaii.
- 1992 — 1992 United States presidential election: Bill Clinton elected president; Al Gore elected vice president.

=== Presidency of Bill Clinton ===
- January 20, 1993 — Clinton becomes the 42nd president; Gore becomes the 45th vice president.
- 1993 — A truck bomb explodes in the parking garage under the World Trade Center in New York City, killing six people and injuring over a thousand.
- 1993 — Branch Davidians standoff and fire near Waco, Texas, resulting in the deaths of 81 people including their leader, David Koresh.
- 1993 — The "Storm of the Century" strikes the Eastern Seaboard, with blizzard conditions and severe weather, killing 300 people and causing $6 billion in damage.
- 1993 — Massive flooding along the Mississippi and Missouri Rivers kill 50 people and devastate the Midwest with $15–$20 billion in damage.
- 1993 — President Clinton signs 'Don't ask, don't tell' into law which prohibits gay or bisexual people from serving openly in the military.
- 1994 — North American Free Trade Agreement goes in effect.
- 1994 — 1994 Northridge earthquake kills 72 and injures 9,000 in the Los Angeles area and causes $20 billion in damage.
- 1994 — Former Arkansas state employee Paula Jones accuses President Clinton of sexual harassment.
- 1994 — The United States hosts the FIFA World Cup, which is won by Brazil.
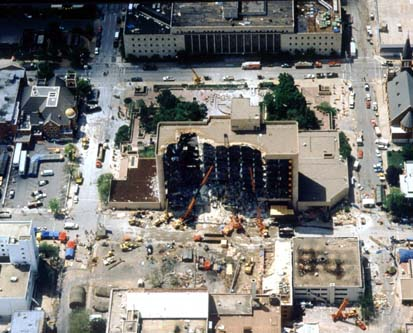
- An aerial view of the Murrah Building, after the Oklahoma City Bombing
  1995 — Oklahoma City bombing kills 168 and wounds 800. The bombing is the worst domestic terrorist incident in U.S. history, and the investigation results in the arrests of Timothy McVeigh and Terry Nichols.
- 1995 — Retired professional football player O. J. Simpson is acquitted of two charges of first-degree murder in the 1994 slayings of his ex-wife, Nicole Brown Simpson, and Ronald Goldman. The nine-month trial receives worldwide publicity.
- 1995 — A heat wave kills 739 in Chicago, bringing to attention the plight of the urban poor and the elderly in extreme weather conditions.
- 1995-1996 — A budget crisis forces the federal government to shut down for several weeks.
- 1996 — TWA Flight 800 explodes off Long Island killing all 230 aboard.
- 1996 — Khobar Towers bombing leaves 19 U.S. servicemen dead in Saudi Arabia.
- 1996 — Centennial Olympic Park bombing at Summer Olympics in Atlanta kills 1 and injures 111.
- 1996 — 1996 United States presidential election: Bill Clinton is re-elected president, Al Gore is re-elected vice president.
- January 20, 1997 — President Clinton and Vice President Gore begin their second terms.
- 1997 — Sparked by a global economic crisis scare, the Dow Jones Industrial Average follows world markets and plummets 554.26, or 7.18%, to 7,161.15.
- 1998 — In the 1998 United States elections, the Republicans hold both the House and the Senate.
- 1998-1999 — Clinton–Lewinsky scandal: President Clinton is accused of having a sexual relationship with 22-year-old White House intern Monica Lewinsky. This leads to the impeachment of Clinton later in the year by the U.S. House of Representatives. Clinton is acquitted of all impeachment charges of perjury and obstruction of justice in a 21-day Senate trial.
- 1999 — The Dow Jones Industrial Average closes above the 10,000 mark for the first time, at 10,006.78.
- 1999 — Teenage students Eric Harris and Dylan Klebold murder 12 other students and one teacher at Columbine High School, sparking an international debate on gun control and bullying.
- 1999 — A violent tornado outbreak in Oklahoma kills 50 people, becoming the first one to produce $1 billion in damage.
- 1999 — The first officer deliberately crashes EgyptAir Flight 990 south of Nantucket, Massachusetts, killing 217.
- 1999 — Along with the rest of the world, the U.S. prepares for the possible effects of the Y2K bug in computers, which was feared to cause computers to become inoperable and wreak havoc. The problem isn't as large as theorized, preparations are successful, and disaster is averted.

== 2000s ==
- 2000 — The Arleigh Burke-class destroyer, the USS Cole (DDG-67) is bombed in Yemeni waters, killing seventeen U.S. Navy sailors.
- 2000 — 2000 United States presidential election: Initial result inconclusive and the result in Florida is disputed. George W. Bush is certified president after a Supreme Court ruling. Al Gore wins the nationwide popular vote but loses the electoral college. Dick Cheney is certified vice president.

=== Presidency of George W. Bush ===
- January 20, 2001 — Bush becomes the 43rd president; Cheney becomes the 46th vice president.
- 2001 — Democrats gain narrow control of Senate after Jim Jeffords defects from the Republican Party.
- 2001 — No Child Left Behind Act education reform bill passed.
- 2001 — Economic Growth and Tax Relief Reconciliation Act of 2001 institutes large tax cuts.
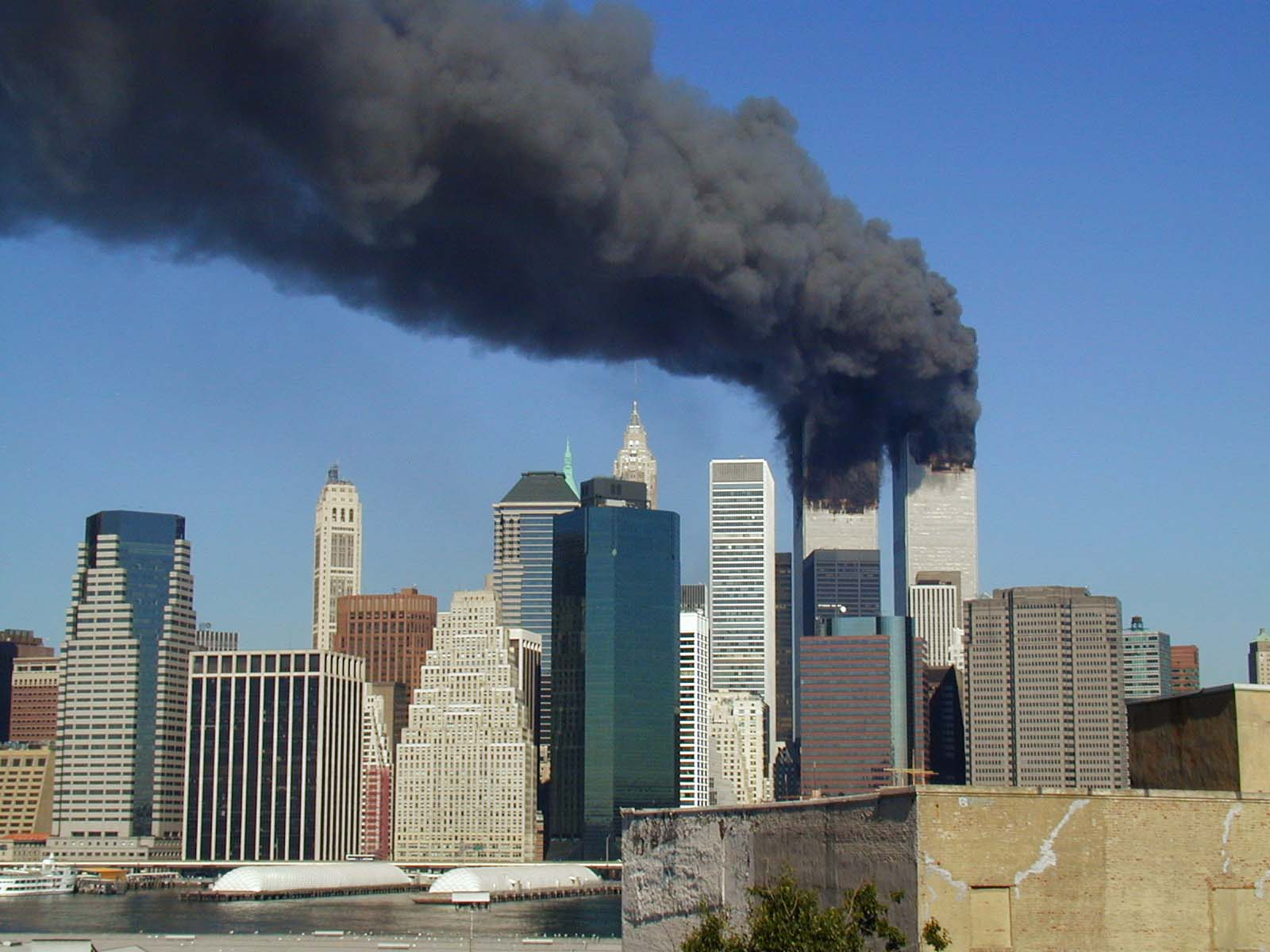
- The Twin Towers in New York City during the September 11 attacks
  2001 — September 11 attacks; 19 terrorists hijack four planes and crash them into the World Trade Center, The Pentagon, and a field in Shanksville, Pennsylvania killing nearly 3,000 people and injuring over 6,000. All civilian air traffic is suspended for three days; the first time an unplanned suspension had occurred in U.S. history.
- 2001 — Congress passes an emergency bailout package for the airline industry as a result of the attacks
- 2001 — Anthrax attacks kill 5 and infect a further 17 through the U.S. Mail system.
- 2001 — The United States launches the invasion of Afghanistan marking the start of Operation Enduring Freedom.
- 2001 — Patriot Act, increasing law enforcement agencies' ability to conduct searches in cases of suspected terrorism. Agencies were enforced.
- 2001 — American Airlines Flight 587 crashes in Queens, New York, killing 265.
- 2002 — The Department of Homeland Security is created in the wake of the September 11 attacks.
- 2002 — The United States withdraws from Anti-Ballistic Missile Treaty.
- 2002 — 10 people are killed and 3 are injured in the Beltway sniper attacks around the Washington D.C. area.
- 2003 — Republicans retake narrow control of the Senate following 2002 elections.
- 2003 — Space Shuttle Columbia disintegrates upon re-entry to the Earth's atmosphere, killing all seven astronauts and resulting in a 29-month suspension of the Space Shuttle program.
- 2003 — A series of incidents occur that institute a crackdown on building, fire, and safety code violations across the United States, including the E2 nightclub stampede which killed 21, The Station nightclub fire which killed 100, and a porch collapse which killed 13.
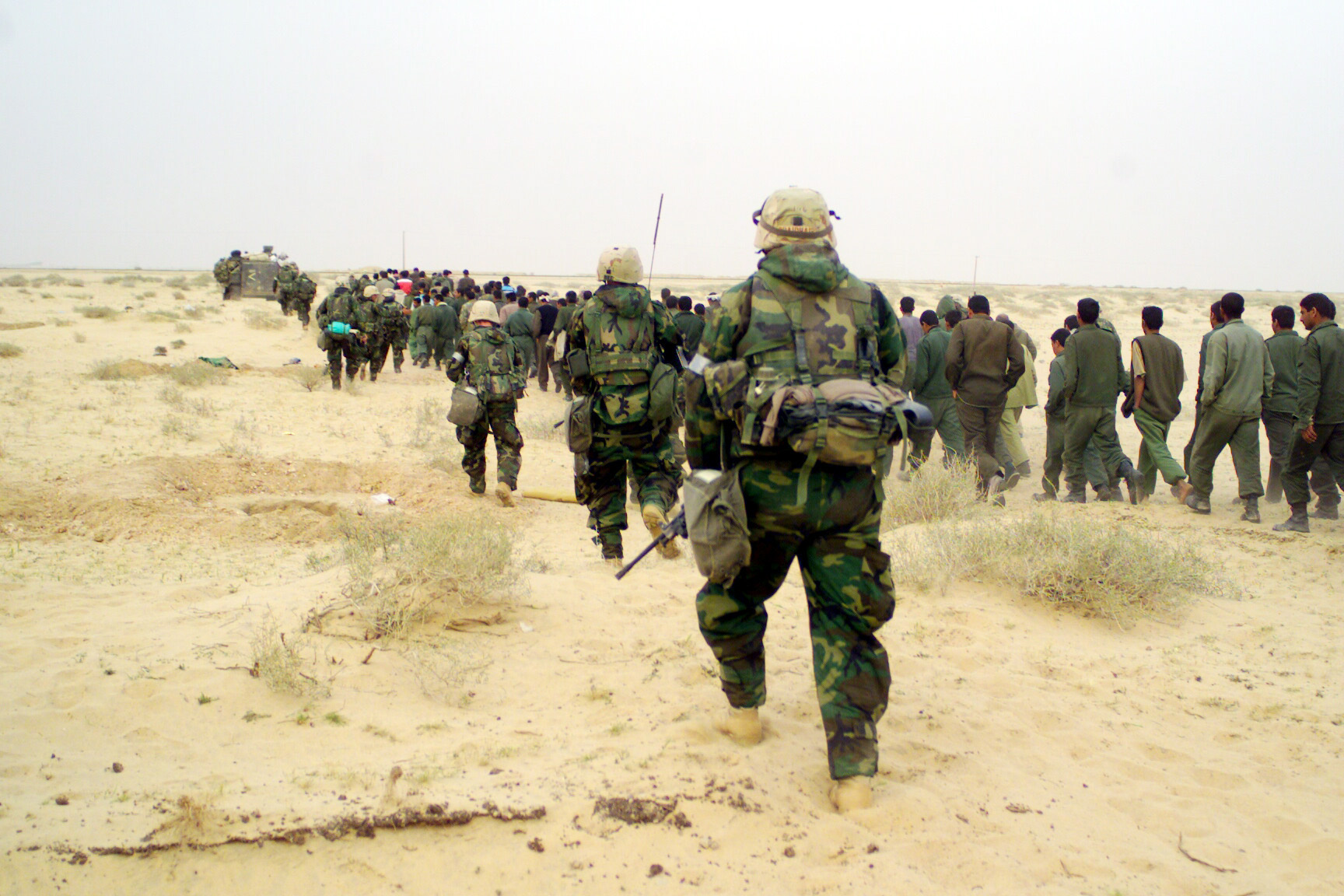
- American troops from the 2nd Battalion, 1st Marine Regiment, escort Iraqi prisoners of war to a holding area in the desert
  2003 — The United States, United Kingdom, Australia, and Poland invades Iraq marking the start of Operation Iraqi Freedom.
- 2003 — U.S. forces continue fighting an insurgency in Iraq while helping the Iraqis build a new army of their own and develop a democratic form of government
- 2003 — In Iraq, deposed Iraqi president Saddam Hussein is captured by U.S. special forces.
- 2004 — The social networking website Facebook is launched.
- 2004 — The 2004 Atlantic hurricane season produces four deadly and damaging hurricanes which impact Florida, Charley, Frances, Ivan, and Jeanne, which kill a combined 100 people in the U.S. and produce over $50 billion in damage
- 2004 — Massachusetts becomes the first state to legalize same-sex marriage in compliance with a ruling from the state's Supreme Court ruling in Goodridge v. Department of Public Health
- 2004 — Former President Ronald Reagan dies from complications resulting from Alzheimer's disease. He lies in state at the U.S. Capitol building before being interred.
- 2004 — 2004 United States presidential election: George W. Bush is re-elected president, Dick Cheney is re-elected vice president.
- January 20, 2005 — President Bush and Vice President Cheney begin their second terms.
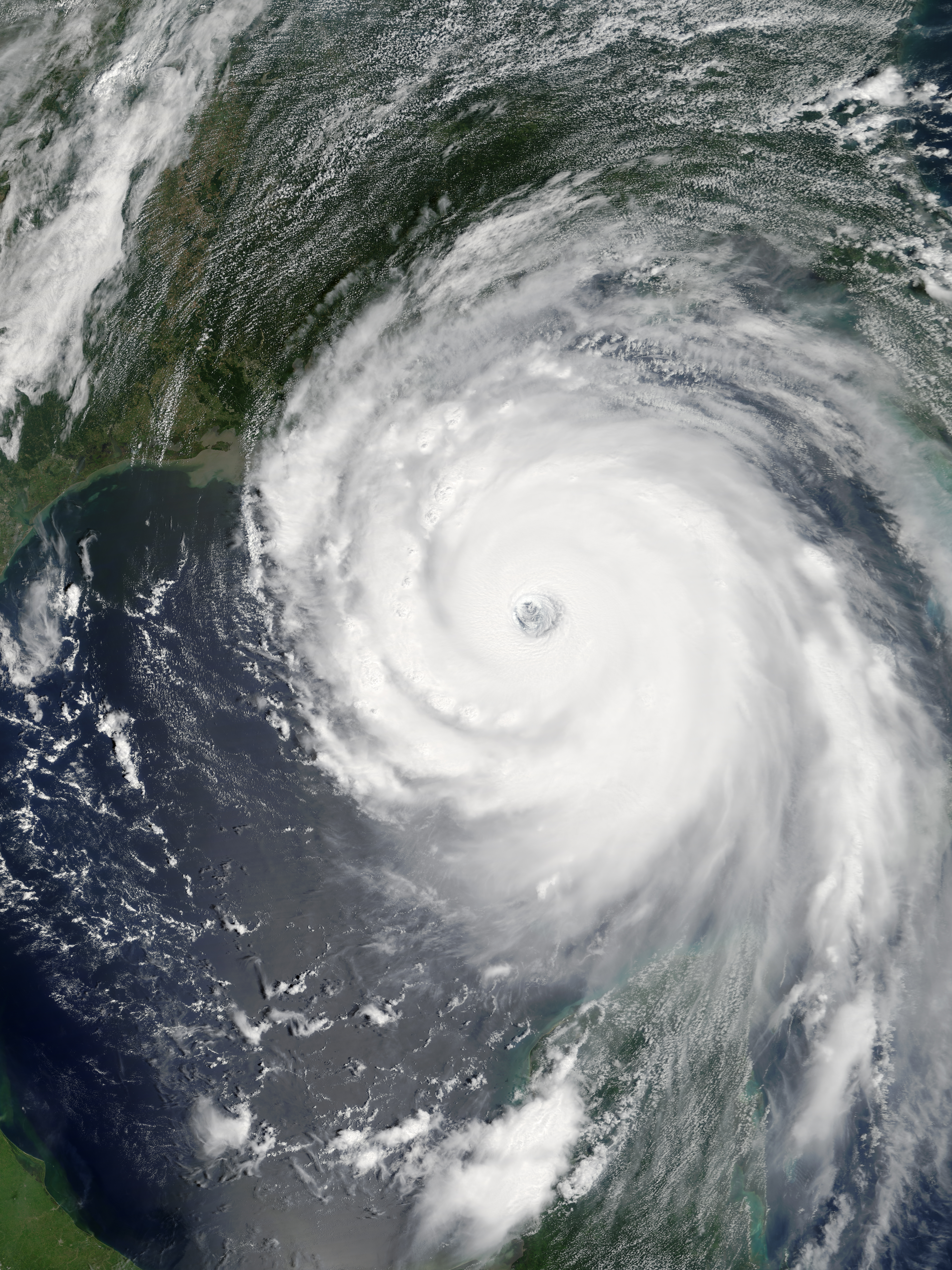
- Katrina at peak intensity in the Gulf of Mexico on August 28
  2005 — Hurricane Katrina devastates the Louisiana, Mississippi, and Alabama coastlines killing at least 1,836 people and causing $81 billion in damage, making it the costliest natural disaster in U.S. history. Weeks later, Hurricane Rita causes $10 billion damage along the Louisiana and Texas coastlines. In October, Hurricane Wilma kills 35 and causes $20 billion in damage in Florida.
- 2006 — The Democratic Party retakes control of both houses of Congress, and gains a majority of state governorships (28-22).
- 2007 — Democrat Nancy Pelosi becomes the first female speaker of the U.S. House of Representatives.
- 2007 — George W. Bush orders a troop surge which substantially increases the number of U.S. troops in Iraq and ultimately leads to reductions in casualties and major victories for coalition and Iraqi forces, against the insurgency.
- 2007 — A South Korean student shoots and kills 32 other students and professors in the Virginia Tech shooting before killing himself. It stands as the worst mass shooting in U.S. history until 2016 and spurs a series of debates on gun control and journalism ethics.
- 2007 — The first iPhone is released for sale in the U.S.
- 2007 — The I-35W Mississippi River bridge in Minneapolis, Minnesota collapses, killing 13 people. The bridge collapse brings to national attention the need to rehabilitate the aging U.S. infrastructure system.
- 2007 — The Great Recession officially begins in December.
- 2008 — The Super Tuesday tornado outbreak kills over 60 people and produces $1 billion in damage across Arkansas, Kentucky, Tennessee, and Alabama.
- 2008 — Steven Kazmierczak kills five, injures 21, and then kills himself in the Northern Illinois University shooting. After this incident, calls are made for more focus on mental health services and interest grows substantially in the group Students for Concealed Carry on Campus.
- 2008 — Hurricane Ike kills 100 people along the Texas coast, produces $31 billion in damage, and contributes to rising oil prices.
- 2008 — U.S. oil prices hit a record $147 per barrel in the wake of—among other factors—international tensions and the falling U.S. dollar vs. the Euro.
- 2008 — The 2008 financial crisis begins as the stock market crashes. In response, U.S. President George W. Bush signs the revised Emergency Economic Stabilization Act into law to create a 700 billion dollar Treasury fund to purchase failing bank assets.
- 2008 — 2008 United States presidential election: Barack Obama is elected president, and Joe Biden elected vice president.

=== Presidency of Barack Obama ===
- January 20, 2009 — Obama becomes the 44th president, Biden becomes the 47th vice president. Obama is the first African-American to hold the office.
- 2009 — The first of a series of Tea Party protests are conducted across the United States, focusing on smaller government, fiscal responsibility, individual freedoms and conservative views of the Constitution.
- 2009 — President Obama obtains Congressional approval for the $787 billion stimulus package, the largest since President Dwight D. Eisenhower.
- 2009 — Pop icon Michael Jackson dies, creating the largest public mourning for an entertainer since the death of Elvis Presley.
- 2009 — Nidal Hasan kills 12 servicemen and injures 31 in the 2009 Fort Hood shooting.

== See also ==
- History of the United States (1980–1991)
- History of the United States (1991–2016)
- History of the United States (2016–present)
