= Maritime history of the United States (1776–1799) =

The Maritime history of the United States (1776–1799) (not to be confused with maritime jurisdiction or law under law of nations) begins with the British colonists before 1776, American merchant vessels had enjoyed the protection of the Royal Navy. During the American Revolution, American ships came under the aegis of France due to a 1778 Treaty of Alliance between the two countries.

== Revolutionary War ==
The first war that an organized United States Merchant Marine took part in was the American Revolutionary War, which lasted from 1775 to 1783. The first merchant marine action in the war took place on June 12, 1775, when a group of Machias, Maine citizens, after hearing the news of what happened in Concord and Lexington, boarded and captured the schooner British warship HMS Margaretta.

In need of critical supplies, they were given the ultimatum that they either load up ships with lumber to be brought to Boston to make British barracks and receive their much needed supplies or go hungry. If they complied with this order from Lieutenant Moore of the British Navy they betrayed the American cause so they chose to fight!

After word reached Boston of this courageous feat, the Continental Congress and the various colonies issued Letters of Marque to privately owned, armed merchant ships known as privateers, which were outfitted as warships to prey on enemy merchant ships. They interrupted the British supply chain all along the eastern seaboard of the United States and across the Atlantic Ocean and the Merchant Marine's role in war began. This predates both the United States Coast Guard (1790) and the United States Navy (1797).

During the American Revolution, American ships came under the aegis of France due to a 1778 Treaty of Alliance between the two countries.

== 1783-1790 ==
By 1783, however, with the end of the Revolution, America became solely responsible for the safety of its own commerce and citizens. Without the means or the authority to field a naval force necessary to protect their ships in the Mediterranean, the nascent U.S. government took a pragmatic, but ultimately self-destructive route. In 1784, the United States Congress allocated money for payment of tribute to the pirates.

During this time merchant ships, mostly from New England, especially Boston, begin to sail to the Pacific Northwest, the Hawaiian Islands, and China, opening the U.S. maritime fur trade. The first such traders were John Kendrick and Robert Gray, captains of the Columbia Rediviva and Lady Washington. From China Gray returned to Boston, making the first US circumnavigation of the world.

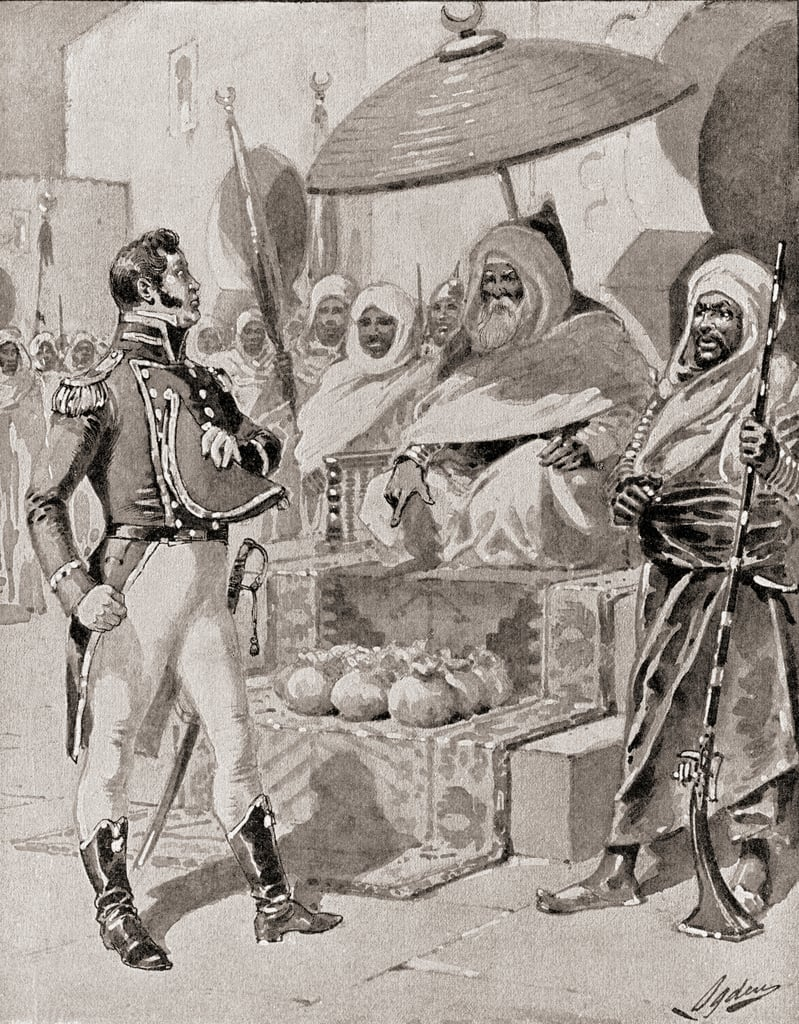
Captain William Bainbridge paying tribute to the Dey.

In 1785, when the Dey of Algiers took two American ships hostage and demanded US$60,000 in ransom for their crews. Then-ambassador to France Thomas Jefferson argued that conceding the ransom would only encourage more attacks. His objections fell on the deaf ears of an inexperienced American government too riven with domestic discord to make a strong show of force overseas. The U.S. paid Algiers the ransom, and continued to pay up to $1 million per year over the next 15 years for the safe passage of American ships or the return of American hostages. Payments in ransom and tribute to the privateering states amounted to 20 percent of United States government annual revenues in 1800.

Jefferson continued to argue for cessation of the tribute, with rising support from George Washington and others. With the recommissioning of the American navy in 1794 and the resulting increased firepower on the seas, it became more and more possible for America to say "no", although by now the long-standing habit of tribute was hard to overturn. A largely successful undeclared war with French privateers in the late 1790s showed that American naval power was now sufficient to protect the nation's interests on the seas. These tensions led to the First Barbary War in 1801.

== The 1790s ==
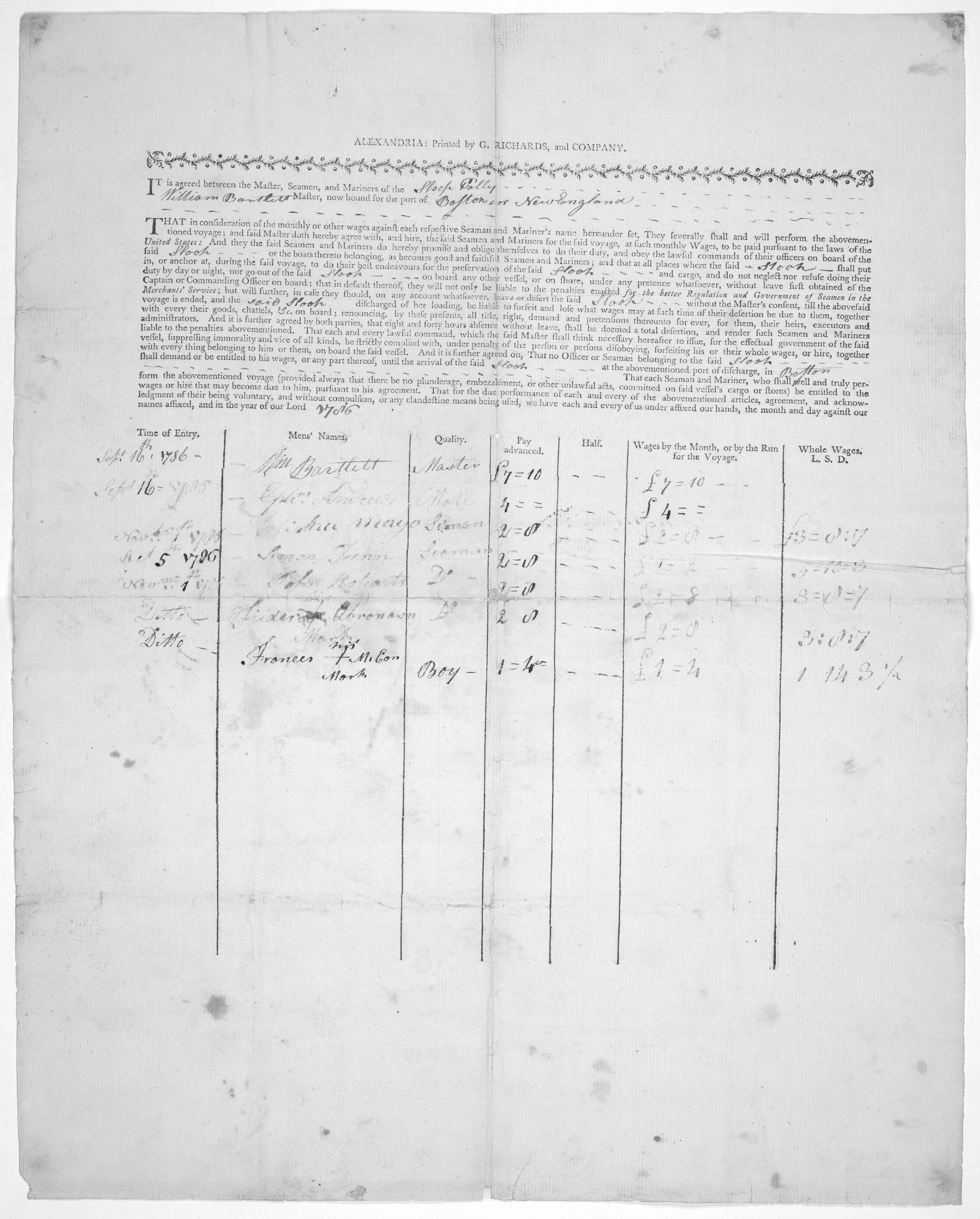
Shipping articles from a 1786 voyage to Boston. Articles is the nautical term for the contract between the crew and the ship.

In 1790 federal legislation was enacted pertaining to seamen and desertion and in 1796 more federal legislation regarding Seaman's Protection Certificates was enacted.

Immediately after the Revolutionary War the brand-new United States of America was struggling to stay financially afloat. National income was desperately needed and a great deal of this income came from import tariffs. Because of rampant smuggling, the need was immediate for strong enforcement of tariff laws, and on August 4, 1790, the United States Congress, urged on by Secretary of the Treasury Alexander Hamilton, created the Revenue-Marine, later renamed Revenue Cutter Service in 1862. It would be the responsibility of the new Revenue-Marine to enforce the tariff and all other maritime laws.

Although tangential to American maritime history, 1799 saw the fall of a colossus of the world's maritime history. The Dutch East India Company, established on March 20, 1602, when the Estates-General of the Netherlands granted it a 21-year monopoly to carry out colonial activities in Asia, formerly the world's largest company, became bankrupt, partly due to the rise of competitive free trade.

== See also ==
- Awards and decorations of the United States Merchant Marine
- History of navigation
- Honourable Company of Master Mariners London
- Jones Act
- Liberty ship
- United States Merchant Marine
- Navy Reserve Merchant Marine Badge
- United States Maritime Service
- United States Merchant Marine Academy
- Slave ship and History of slavery in the United States

== Legislation ==
- HR23 Bill Merchant Marine veteran benefits
- Merchant Seamen's War Service Acts of 1945 and 1947 including 1945 and 1947 Bill of Rights
