= Maritime history of the United States (2000–present) =

The maritime history of the United States (2000–) delineates the continued readiness of the American merchant marine.

== Modern developments ==
On October 22, 2001, the Merchant Marine Act of 2001 was enacted, providing for the construction of 300 ships in the Ready Reserve Force over a span of ten years.

In 2003, 40 RRF ships were used in support of Operation Enduring Freedom and Operation Iraqi Freedom. This RRF contribution was significant and included sea-lifting equipment and supplies into the theatre of combat operations, which included combat support equipment for the Army, Navy Combat Logistics Force, and USMC Aviation Support equipment. By the beginning of May 2005, RRF cumulative support included 85 ship activations that logged almost 12,000 ship operating days, moving almost 25% of the equipment needed to support the U.S. Armed Forces liberation of Iraq.

MSC is also involved in the current Iraq War, having delivered 61 million square feet (5.7 km²) of cargo and 1.1 billion US gallons (4,200,000 m³) of fuel by the end of the first year alone. Merchant mariners are being recognized for their contributions in Iraq. For example, in late 2003, Vice Adm. David Brewer III, commander of Military Sealift Command, awarded the officers and crew members of MV Capt. Steven L. Bennett the Merchant Marine Expeditionary Medal.

On January 8, 2007, Tom Bethel was appointed by the AMO national executive committee to fulfil the term of former president Michael McKay. Bethel had formerly served as AMO's national executive vice president. McKay had been convicted of "three counts of mail fraud and two record-keeping offenses. He was found not guilty of embezzling from an employee benefit plan.".

McKay's brother, former AMO National Secretary-Treasurer Robert McKay was convicted of two counts of mail fraud, embezzlement, and two record-keeping offenses. The father served as AMO president for 36 years.

The RRF was called upon to provide humanitarian assistance to gulf coast areas following Hurricane Katrina and Hurricane Rita landfalls in September 2006. The Federal Emergency Management Agency requested a total of eight vessels to support relief efforts. Messing and berthing was provided for refinery workers, oils spill response teams, longshoremen. One of the vessels provided electrical power.

== See also ==
- Awards and decorations of the United States Merchant Marine
- History of navigation
- Honourable Company of Master Mariners London
- Jones Act
- Liberty ship
- United States Merchant Marine
- Navy Reserve Merchant Marine Badge
- United States Maritime Service
- United States Merchant Marine Academy
- Slave ship and History of slavery in the United States

== Legislation ==
- HR23 Bill Merchant Marine veteran benefits
- Merchant Seamen's War Service Acts of 1945 and 1947 including 1945 and 1947 Bill of Rights
