= Nuclear history of the United States =

US nuclear power and weapons timeline

Nuclear history of the United States describes the history of nuclear affairs in the United States whether civilian or military.

== Timeline ==
=== Manhattan Project ===
The pre-Hiroshima nuclear history of the United States began with the Manhattan Project. This Manhattan Project was the nuclear program for warfare.

Even before the first nuclear weapons had been developed, scientists involved with the Manhattan Project were divided over the use of the weapon. The role of the two atomic bombings of the country in Japan's surrender and the U.S.'s ethical justification for them has been the subject of scholarly and popular debate for decades. The question of whether nations should have nuclear weapons, or test them, has been continually and nearly universally controversial.

=== Hiroshima and Nagasaki ===
The atomic bombings of Hiroshima and Nagasaki (August 1945) heralded the beginning of the Cold War and the prosperity by nuclear of the United States. After the atomic bombings of Hiroshima and Nagasaki, the United States began nuclear weapons tests, Hydrogen bombs were also developed.

In 1945, the pocketbook The Atomic Age heralded the untapped atomic power in everyday objects and depicted a future where fossil fuels would go unused. Glenn T. Seaborg, who chaired the Atomic Energy Commission, wrote "there will be nuclear powered earth-to-moon shuttles, nuclear powered artificial hearts, plutonium heated swimming pools for SCUBA divers, and much more".

During the 1950s, civilian use of the nuclear was also developed. This period was characterized by the phrase "Atoms for peace" (by Dwight Eisenhower).

=== Development of nuclear-powered matters ===
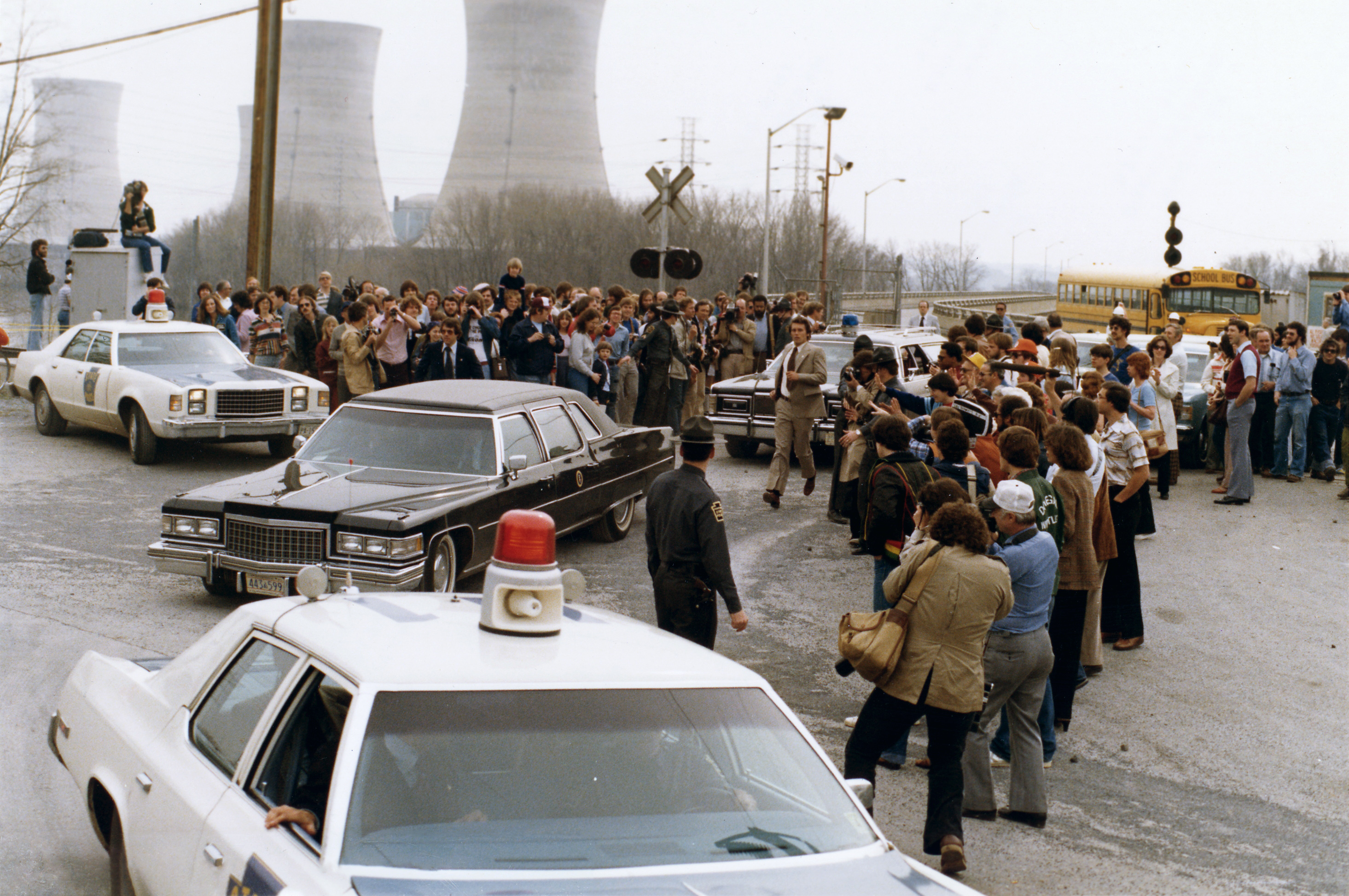
President Jimmy Carter leaving Three Mile Island Nuclear Generating Station for Middletown, Pennsylvania, April 1, 1979

Unexpectedly high costs in the nuclear weapons program, along with competition with the Soviet Union and a desire to spread democracy through the world, created "...pressure on federal officials to develop a civilian nuclear power industry that could help justify the government's considerable expenditures." The Atomic Energy Act of 1954 encouraged private corporations to build nuclear reactors and a significant learning phase followed with many early partial core meltdowns and accidents at experimental reactors and research facilities.

The Cold War reached the climax in the 1960s, especially the Cuban Missile Crisis in 1962. During the 1960s and 1970s, nuclear weapons were spread to many countries in addition to the United States and the Soviet Union. Many nuclear-powered matters such as nuclear-powered ships and nuclear-powered submarines are manufactured during this period.

=== 1970s and 1980s ===
On 28 March 1979, the nuclear disaster occurred in the Three Mile Island Nuclear Generating Station. This was the first disaster in civilian nuclear power plants. By the Three Mile disaster, "China syndrome" became a vogue word, anti-nuclear movements occurred in the United States.

Following the Three Mile Island accident, changing economics, increasing regulation, and public opposition many planned nuclear power projects were canceled. More than a hundred orders for nuclear power reactors, many already under construction, were canceled in the 1970s and 1980s, bankrupting some companies. A cover story in the 1985 issue of Forbes magazine criticized the overall management of the nuclear power program in the United States.

During the second half of the 1980s, the reduction of nuclear weapons was carried out initiated by the perestroika of the Soviet Union. This reduction of nuclear weapons was characterized such as the Intermediate-Range Nuclear Forces Treaty (1987) and the START I (1991).

=== After the Cold War ===
After the Cold War, dramatic changes of the nuclear affairs of the United States are small. Nuclear equipments whether civilian or military are the same scale as the 1980s.

== Civilian nuclear matters ==
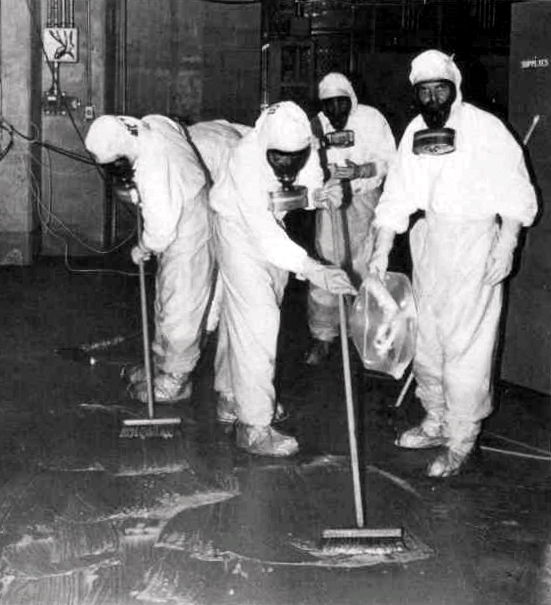
A clean-up crew working to remove radioactive contamination after the Three Mile Island accident.

Nuclear safety and security in the U.S. is governed by federal regulations issued by the Nuclear Regulatory Commission (NRC). The NRC regulates all nuclear plants and materials in the U.S. except for nuclear plants and materials controlled by the U.S. government, as well those powering naval vessels.

The 1979 Three Mile Island accident was a pivotal event that led to questions about U.S. nuclear safety. Earlier events had a similar effect, including a 1975 fire at Browns Ferry, the 1976 testimonials of three concerned GE nuclear engineers, the GE Three. In 1981, workers inadvertently reversed pipe restraints at the Diablo Canyon Power Plant reactors, compromising seismic protection systems, which further undermined confidence in nuclear safety. All of these well-publicised events, undermined public support for the U.S. nuclear industry in the 1970s and the 1980s.

The national U.S. movement against nuclear power had its roots in New England in the 1970s. In 1974, activist Sam Lovejoy toppled a weather tower at the site of the proposed Montague Nuclear Power Plant in Western Massachusetts. The movement "reached critical mass" with the arrests at Seabrook Station Nuclear Power Plant on May 1, 1977, when 1,414 anti-nuclear activists from the Clamshell Alliance were arrested at the Seabrook site. Harvey Wasserman, Howard Morland, Paul Gunter and Frances Crowe played key roles in the movement.

In 2002, the USA had what former NRC Commissioner Victor Gilinsky termed "its closest brush with disaster" since Three Mile Island's 1979 meltdown; a workman at the Davis-Besse reactor found a large rust hole in the top of the reactor pressure vessel. Recent concerns have been expressed about safety issues affecting a large part of the nuclear fleet of reactors. In 2012, the Union of Concerned Scientists, which tracks ongoing safety issues at operating nuclear plants, found that "leakage of radioactive materials is a pervasive problem at almost 90 percent of all reactors, as are issues that pose a risk of nuclear accidents".

Following the Japanese 2011 Fukushima Daiichi nuclear disaster, according to Black & Veatch’s annual utility survey that took place after the disaster, of the 700 executives from the US electric utility industry that were surveyed, nuclear safety was the top concern. There are likely to be increased requirements for on-site spent fuel management and elevated design basis threats at nuclear power plants. License extensions for existing reactors will face additional scrutiny, with outcomes depending on the degree to which plants can meet new requirements, and some of the extensions already granted for more than 60 of the 104 operating U.S. reactors could be revisited. On-site storage, consolidated long-term storage, and geological disposal of spent fuel is "likely to be reevaluated in a new light because of the Fukushima storage pool experience".

In October 2011, the Nuclear Regulatory Commission instructed agency staff to move forward with seven of the 12 safety recommendations put forward by the federal task force in July. The recommendations include "new standards aimed at strengthening operators’ ability to deal with a complete loss of power, ensuring plants can withstand floods and earthquakes and improving emergency response capabilities". The new safety standards will take up to five years to fully implement.

Nuclear power plant accidents in the U.S. with more than US$140 million in property damage
Date	Plant	Location	Description	Cost (in millions $2006 )
March 28, 1979	Three Mile Island	Londonderry Township, Pennsylvania	Loss of coolant and partial core meltdown, see Three Mile Island accident and Three Mile Island accident health effects	US$2,400
March 9, 1985	Browns Ferry	Athens, Alabama	Instrumentation systems malfunction during startup, which led to suspension of operations at all three Units	US$1,830
April 11, 1986	Pilgrim	Plymouth, Massachusetts	Recurring equipment problems force emergency shutdown of Boston Edison's plant	US$1,001
March 31, 1987	Peach Bottom	Delta, Pennsylvania	Units 2 and 3 shutdown due to cooling malfunctions and unexplained equipment problems	US$400
December 19, 1987	Nine Mile Point	Scriba, New York	Malfunctions force Niagara Mohawk Power Corporation to shut down Unit 1	US$150
February 20, 1996	Millstone	Waterford, Connecticut	Leaking valve forces shutdown of Units 1 and 2, multiple equipment failures found	US$254
September 2, 1996	Crystal River	Crystal River, Florida	Balance-of-plant equipment malfunction forces shutdown and extensive repairs	US$384
February 1, 2010	Vermont Yankee	Vernon, Vermont	Deteriorating underground pipes leak radioactive tritium into groundwater supplies	US$700

== Military nuclear matters ==
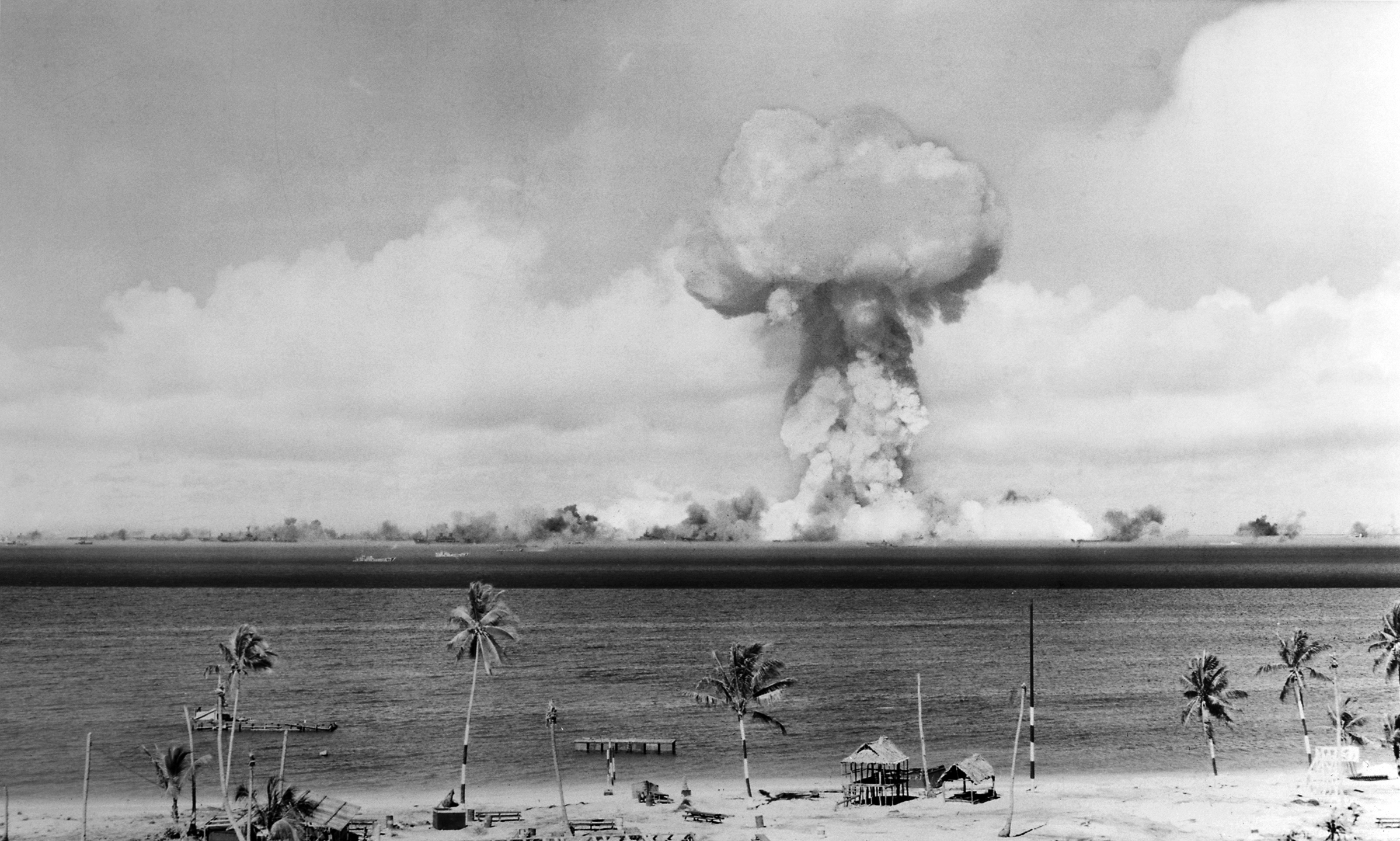
Operation Crossroads Test Able, a 23-kiloton air-deployed nuclear weapon detonated on July 1, 1946. This bomb used, and consumed, the infamous Demon core that took the lives of two scientists in two separate criticality accidents.

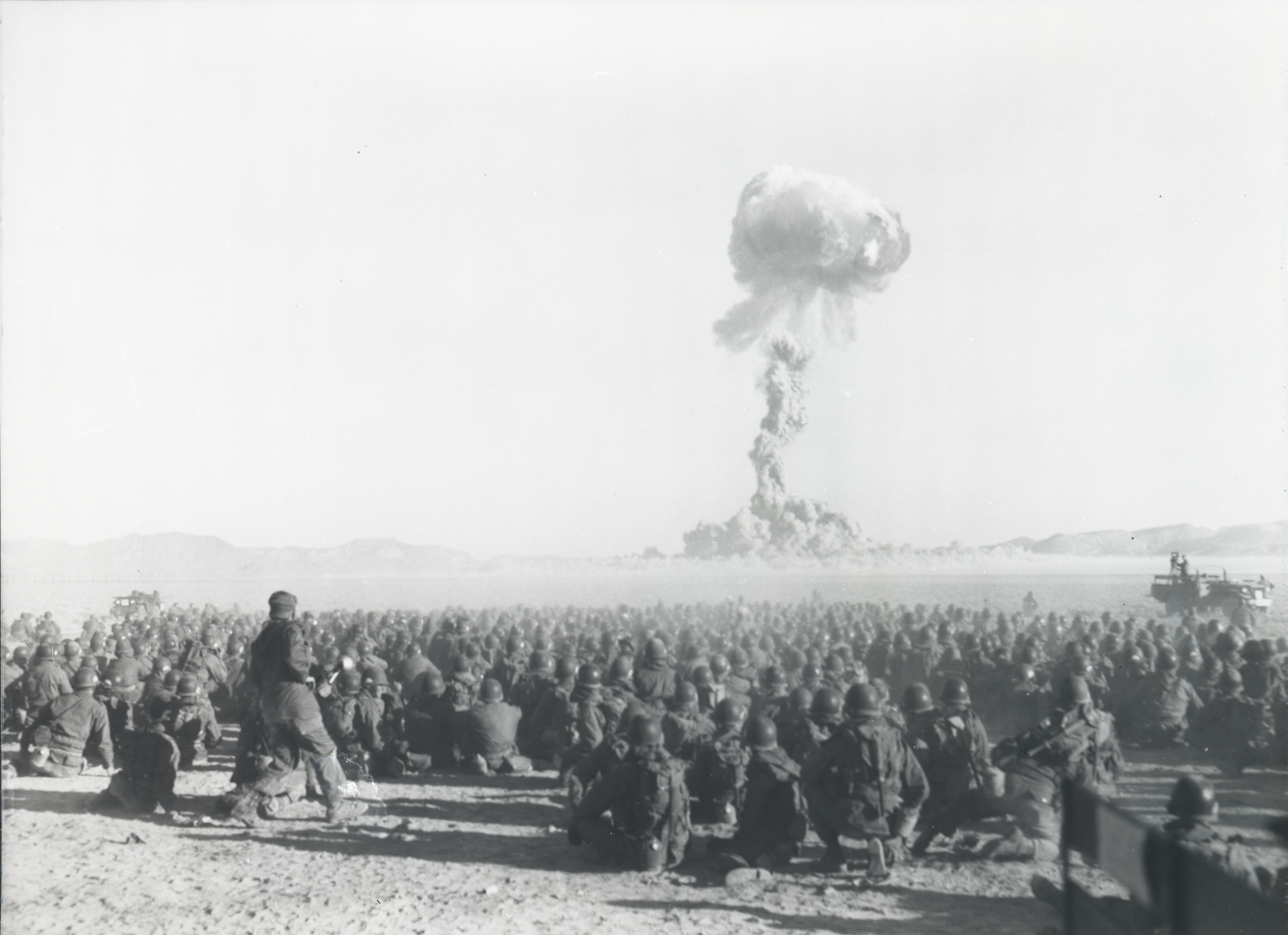
The U.S. conducted hundreds of nuclear tests at the Nevada Test Site.

Between 1940 and 1996, the U.S. spent at least $11.9 trillion in present-day terms on nuclear weapons development, including platforms development (aircraft, rockets and facilities), command and control, maintenance, waste management and administrative costs. It is estimated that, since 1945, the United States produced more than 70,000 nuclear warheads, which is more than all other nuclear weapon states combined. The Soviet Union/Russia has built approximately 55,000 nuclear warheads since 1949, France built 1110 warheads since 1960, the United Kingdom built 835 warheads since 1952, China built about 600 warheads since 1964, and other nuclear powers built less than 500 warheads all together since they developed their first nuclear weapons. Until November 1962, the vast majority of U.S. nuclear tests were aboveground. After the acceptance of the Partial Test Ban Treaty, all testing was regulated underground, in order to prevent the dispersion of nuclear fallout.

As of February 2006, over $1.2 billion in compensation was paid to U.S. citizens exposed to nuclear hazards as a result of the U.S. nuclear weapons program, and by 1998, at least $759 million was paid to the Marshall Islanders in compensation for their exposure to U.S. nuclear testing.

In 2010, the United States maintained an arsenal of 5,113 warheads and facilities for their construction and design, though many of the Cold War facilities have since been deactivated and are sites for environmental remediation. On December 5, 2012, the National Nuclear Security Administration announced that the U.S. conducted its 27th subcritical underground nuclear test since 1992, when the U.S. ended test nuclear explosions.
