= Maritime history of the United States (1800–1899) =

The maritime history of the United States (1800–1899) saw an expansion of naval activity.

== The War of 1812 (1812-1815) ==
Americans declared war on Britain on June 18, 1812, for a combination of reasons—outrage at the impressment (seizure) of thousands of American sailors, frustration at British restrictions on neutral trade while Britain warred with France, and anger at British military support for hostile tribes in the Ohio-Indiana-Michigan area. After war was declared, Britain offered to withdraw the trade restrictions, but it was too late for the American "War Hawks", who turned the conflict into what they called a "second war for independence."

Part of the American strategy was deploying several hundred privateers to attack British merchant ships, which hurt British commercial interests, especially in the West Indies.

=== Clipper ships ===
In the United States, the term "clipper" referred to the Baltimore clipper, a topsail schooner that was developed in Chesapeake Bay before the American Revolution and was lightly armed in the War of 1812, sailing under Letters of Marque and Reprisal, when the type—exemplified by the Chasseur, launched at Fells Point, Baltimore, 1814— became known for its incredible speed; a deep draft enabled the Baltimore clipper to sail close to the wind (Villiers 1973). Clippers, outrunning the British blockade of Baltimore, came to be recognized as ships built for speed rather than cargo space; while traditional merchant ships were accustomed to average speeds of under 5 knots (9 km/h), clippers aimed at 9 knots (17 km/h) or better. Sometimes these ships could reach 20 knots (37 km/h).

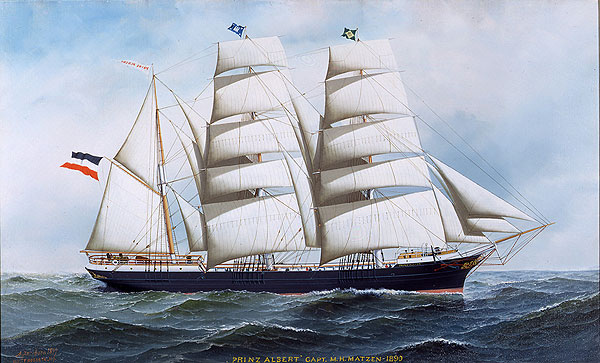
"The Prinz Albert," 1897, by Antonio Jacobsen

Clippers were built for seasonal trades such as tea, where an early cargo was more valuable, or for passenger routes. The small, fast ships were ideally suited to low-volume, high-profit goods, such as spices, tea, people, and mail. The values could be spectacular. The "Challenger" returned from Shanghai with "the most valuable cargo of tea and silk ever to be laden in one bottom." The competition among the clippers was public and fierce, with their times recorded in the newspapers. The ships had low expected lifetimes and rarely outlasted two decades of use before they were broken up for salvage. Given their speed and maneuverability, clippers frequently mounted cannon or carronade and were often employed as pirate vessels, privateers, smuggling vessels, and in interdiction service.

== 1815-1830 ==
During the 18th century, ships carrying cargo, passengers and mail between Europe and America would sail only when they were full. However, in the early 19th century, as trade with America became more common, schedule regularity became a valuable service.

Starting in 1818, ships of the Black Ball Line began regularly scheduled trips between Britain and America. These "packet ships" (named for their delivery of mail "packets") gained fame for keeping to their disciplined schedules but notoriety for the often harsh treatment of seamen to ensure they made their times. Sailors gave them the nickname "bloodboats".

During the 1820s, American whalers started flocking to the Pacific, where they had more contact with the Hawaiian Islands.

Because of the influence of whaling and several local droughts, there was substantial migration from Cape Verde to the U.S., most notably to New Bedford, Massachusetts. This migration built strong ties between the two locations, and a strong packet trade between New England and Cape Verde developed during the early-to-mid-19th century.

The Erie Canal was started in 1817 and finished in 1825, encouraging inland trade and strengthening the position of the port of New York.

== The 1830s ==
In 1832, Secretary of the Treasury Louis McLane ordered in writing for revenue cutters to conduct winter cruises to assist mariners in need, and Congress made the practice an official part of regulations in 1837. This was the beginning of the lifesaving mission that the later U.S. Coast Guard would be best known for worldwide.

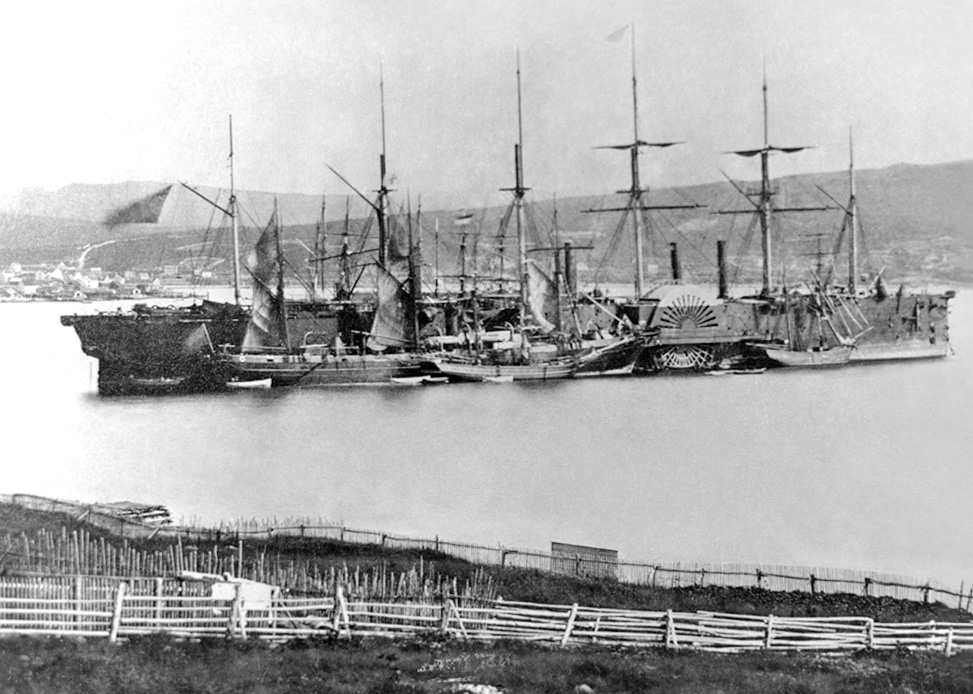
SS Great Eastern

The side-wheel paddle steamer SS Great Western was the first purpose-built steamship to initiate regularly scheduled trans-Atlantic crossings, starting in 1838.

== The 1840s ==
The first regular steamship service from the west to the east coast of the United States began on February 28, 1849, with the arrival of the SS California in San Francisco Bay. California left New York Harbor on October 6, 1848, rounded Cape Horn at the tip of South America, and arrived at San Francisco, California after a 4-month 21-day journey. SS Great Eastern was built in 1854–1857 with the intent of linking Great Britain with India, via the Cape of Good Hope, without coaling stops; she would know a turbulent history, and was never put to her intended use; However, in 1866 she laid down the first successful transatlantic telegraph cable.

== The 1850s ==
Between 1851 and May 1852, "Seventy-four clipper-built vessels arrived in the port of San Francisco. An average passage was 125 days." "The voyage around Cape Horn ... [was reduced] from seven or eight to three or four months."

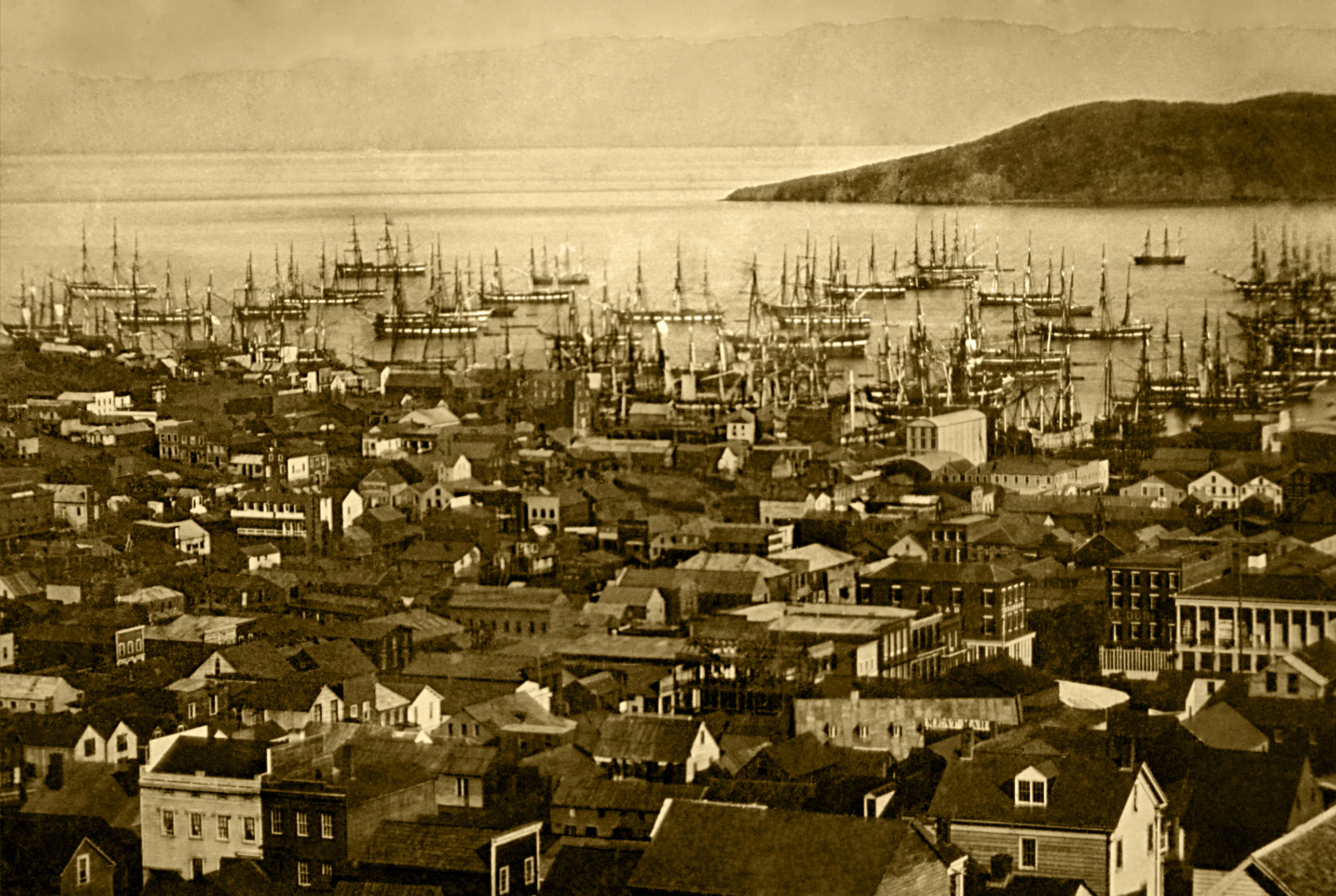
Merchant ships fill San Francisco harbor in 1850 or 1851

In 1852, the lighthouse board established and published first Light List and Notice to Mariners.

In 1854, Andrew Furuseth was born in Norway, and Western river engineers form a "fraternal organization" that is a precursor to MEBA. Also, Commodore Matthew Calbraith Perry established trade relations with Japan with the signing of the Convention of Kanagawa.

In 1855, "the zenith year of Yankee ship-building ... 381 ships and barks and 126 brigs [were launched] for deep-sea trade."

In 1857, New Bedford had 329 registered whaling ships. The discovery of petroleum in Titusville, Pennsylvania, on August 27, 1859 by Edwin L. Drake was the beginning of the end of commercial whaling in the United States as kerosene, distilled from crude oil, replaced whale oil in lamps. Later, electricity gradually replaced oil lamps, and by the 1920s, the demand for whale oil had disappeared entirely.

Clipper ship sailing card for the "Free Trade," printed by Nesbitt & Co., NY, early 1860s

Decline in the use of clippers started with the economic slump following the Panic of 1857 and continued with the gradual introduction of the steamship. Although clippers could be much faster than the early steamships, clippers were ultimately dependent on the vagaries of the wind, while steamers could reliably keep to a schedule. The steam clipper was developed around this time, and had auxiliary steam engines which could be used in the absence of wind. An example of this type was the Royal Charter, built in 1857 and wrecked on the coast of Anglesey in 1859.

In 1859, the "Memphis and St. Louis Packet Line," which would later become the Anchor Line was formed, principally providing service to these two cities and points in between. The Anchor line was a steamboat company that operated a fleet of boats on the Mississippi River between St. Louis, Missouri, and New Orleans, Louisiana, between 1859 and 1898, when it went out of business. It was one of the most well-known, if not successful, pools of steamboats formed on the lower Mississippi River in the decades following the American Civil War.

== The 1860s ==
In 1861, the American merchant marine became world's second largest standing at just over 5.5 million tons while Great Britain's was only slightly more at 5.8 million tons; the remainder of the world's fleets totalled an additional 5.8 million tons.

The final blow to clipper ships came in the form of the Suez Canal, opened in 1869, which provided a huge shortcut for steamships between Europe and Asia, but which was difficult for sailing ships to use.

=== Civil War (1861-1865) ===
Merchant shipping was a key target in the U.S. Civil War. For example the CSS Alabama a Confederate cruiser commissioned on 24 August 1862 spent months capturing and burning ships in the North Atlantic and intercepting grain ships bound for Europe. Other Confederate commerce raiders include the CSS Sumter, CSS Florida, and CSS Shenandoah.

=== 1866-1870 ===
The first West Coast attempt at unionizing merchant seamen came with the "Seamen's Friendly Union and Protective Society." The union quickly dissolved.

== The 1870s ==
By 1870, a number of inventions, such as the screw propeller and the triple expansion engine made trans-oceanic shipping economically viable. Thus began the era of cheap and safe travel and trade around the world.

Starting in 1873, deck officers must pass mandatory license examination.

In 1874, the union that would become the Marine Engineers' Benevolent Association formed. The Buffalo Association of Engineers began corresponding with other marine engineer associations around the country. These organizations held a convention in Cleveland, Ohio including delegates from Buffalo, New York, Cleveland, Ohio, Detroit, Michigan, Chicago, Illinois and Baltimore, Maryland. This organization called itself the National Marine Engineers Association and chose as its president Garret Dow of Buffalo.

On February 25, 1875 MEBA was formed.

As of 1876, Plimsoll marks are required on all U.S. vessels

== The 1880s ==
The Sailors' Union of the Pacific (SUP) founded on March 6, 1885 in San Francisco, California is an American labor union of mariners, fishermen and boatmen working aboard U.S. flag vessels.

At its fourth meeting in 1885, the fledgling organization adopted the name Coast Sailor's Union and elected George Thompson its first president. Andrew Furuseth, who had joined the union on June 3, 1885, was elected to its highest office in January 1887. In 1889, he returned to sea but was reelected to the position of union secretary in 1891.

The American Federation of Labor (AFL) was founded in 1886 by Samuel Gompers as a national federation of skilled workers' unions. Several maritime unions would affiliate with the AFL.

In 1887, the Merchant Marine and Fisheries Committee was formed.

== The 1890s ==
In 1891, a marine engineering school opened in Massachusetts

It was during this period that Andrew Furuseth on July 29, 1891 that Furuseth merged the Coast Seamen's Union with the Steamship Sailor's Union with the new organization named the Sailors' Union of the Pacific. With the exception of a two-month period when he shipped out as a fisherman, Furuseth was secretary of the SUP until 1935.

Originally formed as the National Union of Seamen of America in 1892 in Chicago, Illinois, the organization was a federation of independent unions, including the Sailors' Union of the Pacific, the Lake Seamen's Union, the Atlantic Coast Seamen's Union, and the Seamen's and Firemen's Union of the Gulf Coast.

Formed by maritime labor representatives from America's Pacific, Great Lakes and Gulf Coast regions In 1893, the ISU affiliated with the American Federation of Labor, in 1893 and in took the name International Seamen's Union of America in 1895.

In 1895, the Maguire Act was passed: desertion from coastal vessels no longer punishable by imprisonment. In 1897, the White Act was passed, which abolished "imprisonment of US citizens for desertion in American or nearby waters," and ends corporal punishment.

== See also ==
- Awards and decorations of the United States Merchant Marine
- History of navigation
- Honourable Company of Master Mariners London
- Jones Act
- Liberty ship
- United States Merchant Marine
- Navy Reserve Merchant Marine Badge
- United States Maritime Service
- United States Merchant Marine Academy
- Slave ship and History of slavery in the United States

== Legislation ==
- HR23 Bill Merchant Marine veteran benefits
- Merchant Seamen's War Service Acts of 1945 and 1947 including 1945 and 1947 Bill of Rights
