= History of United States–Middle East economic relations =

The Middle East has been a region of geopolitical and economic significance to the world far before American involvement in the area. This was largely because the “Middle East contained or bordered on the land bridges, passageways, and narrows – the Sinai isthmus, the Caucuses, the Strait of Gibraltar, the Dardanelles, Bab el Mandeb, and the Strait of Hormuz – and the sheltered seas – the Mediterranean, the Black Sea, the Caspian Sea, the Red Sea, and the Persian Gulf – that provided the best routes connecting the different extremities of the vast Eurasian/African continent.” The value of being a prominent player in the region was therefore obvious to the United States as well as to several other Western powers including Great Britain and France. In addition to its pivotal geographic location in the world, the abundance of oil in the Middle East has probably played the biggest role in issues of foreign policy and international relations. The United States needed Middle Eastern oil and Middle Eastern nations needed Western capital and technology. This mutually beneficial but dependent relationship would forge strong alliances but also be the cause of harsh conflicts.

== Background ==
The history of American economic interests in the Middle East cannot be examined without understanding the involvement of several Western powers in the region. The availability of oil in the Middle East was always known, however, it did not influence politics or economics until Winston Churchill, prime minister of the United Kingdom, decided to create a new generation of battleships fueled by oil instead of coal in 1908. This decision had a massive impact on geopolitical and economic concerns. With this decision, the success and importance of the newly formed Anglo-Persian Oil Company was guaranteed and the world's dependence on oil was initiated. Due to relative power considerations, all other battleships were rendered obsolete and so with one swift move, oil became a crucial, yet external resource.

== Countries ==
While the specifics of the relations the United States had with several Middle Eastern countries vary, the same trends of Western dependence on oil and Middle Eastern need for foreign wealth recur throughout most of the Middle East.

=== Iraq ===
The origin of American economic involvement in the Middle East, particularly with regards to oil, dates back to 1928 with the signing of the Red Line Agreement. This was preceded by the founding of the Turkish Petroleum Company, which was created with the intention of exploring and extracting oil within the Ottoman Empire. Eventually, after the discovery of a large oil field in Iraq in 1928, the issue of distribution arose. Each of the large powers – France, the United Kingdom, and the United States – worried about being edged out by the other two. The Red Line Agreement was eventually signed, giving the Near East Development Corporation, the Anglo-Persian Oil Company, Royal Dutch/Shell, and the Compagnie Française des Pétroles each 23.75% of any oil that was produced by the Turkish Petroleum Company. The Near East Development Corporation represented American interests and included Jersey Standard Oil, Socony-Vacuum Oil Company, Gulf Oil, the Pan-American Petroleum and Transport Company, and Atlantic Refining. The remaining 5% share went to an Armenian businessman, Calouste Gulbenkian, who had previously owned shares within TPC. The more important provision of the Red Line Agreement was that none of the four parties could develop any oilfields from the Suez Canal to the Iran, with the exception of Kuwait (the area that the TPC had jurisdiction over), unless that party gained support and approval from the other three.

=== Iran ===
The American perspective on Iran was originally one of indifference yet eventually grew into something much more intrusive in the 1940s. America's relationship with Iran grew with the deterioration of Iran's relationship with the British owned Anglo-Iranian Oil Company. In 1948, Britain received more profits from oil production in Iran than Iran did. The United States therefore feared that this unbalanced relationship would push the Iranians towards the Soviets in what would be a great loss in the perpetual Cold War struggle as well as the elimination of access to Iranian oil. Thus, the United States became much more directly involved in Iranian affairs and oil. The National Security Council of the United States urged the United Kingdom to resolve the oil dispute before decisive actions were taken by the Iranians. Eventually, this conflict over oil revenues led to the full nationalization of oil by Prime Minister Mosaddeq in 1951. This resulted in the Iranian coupe of 1953 in which the American CIA and British MI6 performed a joint operation overthrowing the democratically elected Mosaddeq in what is known as Operation Ajax.

=== Saudi Arabia ===
Perhaps one of the most significant moments in American economic involvement in the Middle East came in 1933 with Ibn Saud, founder and king of the new Saudi Arabian kingdom awarded concessions to the American company, Standard Oil of California. While the British had been the main western power involved in the Middle East up until this point, this momentous decision signified the main turning point in American relations with Saudi Arabia and later with more Middle Eastern nations. Standard Oil of California ended up becoming the Arabian-American Oil Company (ARAMCO) after it merged with Texaco and Socony. Thus, the interests of the United States were intertwined with the interests of the Saudi Arabian monarchy. Saudi Arabia needed the technology and expertise of the Americans and the Americans needed oil in order to maintain their state of power in the world as well as compete with the USSR during the Cold War. ARAMCO, unlike its British predecessor, offered the Saudi Arabians 50% of profits from oil, keeping both parties satisfied. Building off of this mutually beneficial economic relationship, a political and military association began to form. This is reflected with the building of an American airbase in Dhahran in eastern Saudi Arabia and by the continuing alliance between the U.S. and Saudi Arabia.
