= The Penguin History of the United States of America =

- Second edition cover (2001)
- Author: Hugh Brogan
- Language: English
- Subject: U.S. history
- Genre: Non-fiction
- Publisher: Penguin Books
- Pages: 752 (2nd ed.)
- ISBN: 978-0-14-025255-2 (2nd ed.)

The Penguin History of the United States of America is a non-fiction book about the history of the United States written by Hugh Brogan and published by Penguin Books. It was originally titled The Longman History of the United States of America, published by the Longman company from 1985 through 1999. Longman and Penguin are both part of Pearson PLC. The book starts in the pre-Columbian era and, in the first edition, ends in the mid 1970s. The second edition, or "new edition", added a chapter covering through to the end of the 1980s. The book introduces a wide range of dynamic figures and events in American history from the beginning of the British colony to the Reagan era.
