= Helene Carter =

Canadian natural history illustrator

Helene Carter Silvey
- Born: Helene Carter; 1887; Toronto, Ontario, Canada
- Died: December 31, 1960 (aged 73); New York City, New York, U.S
- Education: Ontario College of Art & Design University (BA)
- Occupation: Illustrator
- Notable work: Swallows and Amazons

Helene Carter Silvey (1887–December 31, 1960) was a Canadian illustrator and author from Toronto, Ontario, and is known for her illustrative work within the natural history field. She served as a governing member in the Society of Illustrators, and worked with the Women's National Book Association. All her work was published under her maiden name.

== Early life and education ==
Silvey was born in Toronto, Ontario, in 1887. As a child, she regularly enjoyed the company of wild animals where she would sew clothing for them to the dismay of her mother. Growing up, she spent her days working on art and practicing violin, and on her sixteenth birthday she enrolled in the Ontario College of Art & Design University. During school she focused on commercial art studies and enjoyed theater. After she'd graduated in 1907, she worked in corporate advertising.

In 1914, she moved to New York City where she studied at the Arts Students League and the Roerich Academy of Arts. Her career continued in New York where she became highly respected within the local scene.

== Career ==
Silvey's professional career began with her traveling to Italy in 1921 to work with Swiss-novelist Carl Spitteler for his short story Two Little Misogynists, she later returned to Italy via France in 1930 for Gertrude Linnell's historical documentation novel Behind the Battlements.

In the 1930s, Silvey's career took off as she contributed her illustrative skills into children's literature. This is seen in her work with British author D. K. Broster for her Jacobite Trilogy series, and Arthur Ransome's Swallows and Amazons series. By 1931, she was a member of the Society of Illustrators committee and acted as a judge for open illustration exhibition contests.

In 1934, Slivey began to work with American zoologist Raymond Ditmars, who she claims welcomed her to the world of natural history illustrators, due to this collaboration she worked more specifically in the field.

In the latter half of her life during the 1950s, she focused on working on the "First Book" series, which surveyed the history of certain animals and hobbies of mundane life. Slivey most often worked with the American author and librarian Jannette May Lucas, and the publishing house J.B. Lippincott Company.

== Death ==
Silvey died in the Manhattan Hospital in New York City after a general operation, she was 73. By the time she'd died she was a secretary for the Artists Guild, and a governing member of the Society of Illustrators.

== Legacy ==
A selected collection of Silvey's children's literature illustrations are held in the University of Minnesota.

== List of written and illustrated work ==
- Smokey and Pinocchio (J. B. Lippincott Company, 1940)

== List of illustrative work ==
- Two Little Misogynists (written by Carl Spitteler, Henry Holt and Company, 1922)
- The Three of Salu (written by Carol Della Chiesa, World Book Company, 1923)
- Picture-Story Reading Lessons Series 1 Dictionary (written by Nila Banton Smith and Stuart Appleton Curtis, World Book Company, 1924–26)
- Bemol and Kusum (written by Herbert E. Wyman, World Book Company, 1926)
- Natalia and Nikolai, children of Russia (written by Varia Klenova and Louise Lamprey, World Book Company, 1928)
- City Stories Told by City Children as They Go Exploring in New York (written by Florence Matthews Tchaika, MacMillan Publishers, 1928)
- The Flight of the Heron (written by D.K. Broster, Coward McCann, 1930)
- The Omnibus (written by Jules Verne, J. B. Lippincott Company, 1931)
- Swallows and Amazons (written by Arthur Ransome, J.B. Lippincott Company, 1931)
- Behind the Battlements (written by Gertrude Linnell, MacMillan Publishers, 1931)
- Grandmother's Doll (written by Elizabeth Gladwin Bouton, Duffield & Green, 1931)
- Wayside Flowers: Poems of the Out-Of-Doors (written by William Wordsworth, MacMillan Publishers, 1931)
- Gleam in the North (written by D.K Broster, Coward McCann, 1931)
- Swallowdale (written by Arthur Ransome, J.B. Lippincott Company, 1932)
- Puppet Parade (written by Carol Della Chiesa, Longman, 1932)
- Peter Duck (written by Arthur Ransome, J.B. Lippincott Company, 1933)
- Winter Holiday (written by Arthur Ransome, J.B. Lippincott Company, 1933)
- All the Ways of Building (written by Louise Lamprey, MacMillan publishers, 1933)
- The Dark Milk (written by D.K Broster, Coward McCann, 1934)
- Ruth visits Margot, a little French girl (written by Roy A. Keech, Albert Whitman & Co, 1934)
- The Book of Zoography (written by Raymond Ditmars, J.B. Lippincott Company, 1934)
- Coot Club (written by Arthur Ransome, J.B. Lippincott Company, 1934)
- The Poet's Craft (complied by Helen Fern Daringer and Anne Thaxter Eaton, World Book Company, 1935)
- The Book of Living Reptiles (written by Raymond Ditmars, J.B. Lippincott Company, 1936)
- The Gleam in the North (written by D.K. Broster, Coward McCann, 1936)
- The Earth Changes (written by Jannette May Lucas, J.B. Lippincott Company, 1937)
- The Book of Insect Oddities: Where the Strange Insects of the World are Found (written by Raymond Ditmars, J.B. Lippincott Company, 1938)
- The Baby Whale Sharp Ears (written by John Y. Beaty, J.B. Lippincott Company, 1938)
- Fruits of the Earth (written by Jannette May Lucas, J. B. Lippincott Company, 1942)
- Twenty Little Pets From Everywhere (written by Raymond Ditmars, Julian Messner, 1943)
- Pierre Keeps Watch (written by Maria Gleit, Charles Scribner's Sons, 1944)
- Indian Harvest: Wild food plants of America (written by Jannette May Lucas, J.B. Lippincott Company, 1945)
- The Gulf Stream (written by Ruth Brindze, Vanguard Press, 1945)
- Where Did Your Garden Grow? (written by Jannette May Lucas, Harper Collins,1945)
- Desert Animals (written by Rita Kissin, K. McKay Company, 1947)
- The Story of Our Calendar (written by Ruth Brindze, Vanguard Press, 1949)
- The First Book of Trees (written by Maribelle Cormack, Greystone Press, 1951)
- The First Book of Bees (written by Albert B. Tibbets, Greystone Press, 1952)
- Water, Water Everywhere! (written by Mary Walsh, Abingdon-Cokesbury Press, 1953)
- The First Book of Prehistoric Animals (written by Alice Dickinson, Franklin Watts, 1954)
- The First Book of Gardening (written by Virginia Kirkus, Watts, 1956)
- The First Book of Tropical Mammals (written by Helen Hoke, Vanguard Press, 1958)

== Awards ==
Award	Year	Work	Ref.
New York Tribune Spring Festival Award	1945	The Gulf Stream	
New York Tribune Spring Festival Award	1949	The Story of Our Calendar	
