= Michael Hordern on stage, screen and radio =

Michael Hordern (3 October 1911 – 2 May 1995) was an English actor whose career spanned seven decades. He made more than 160 film appearances, usually in supporting character roles, and appeared in over 100 theatrical productions, most of them Shakespeare.

== Stage credits ==
Hordern appeared as an amateur for several seasons at the St Pancras People's Theatre, while working at the Educational Supply Association, before he turned professional in 1937.

Hordern's stage credits
Production	Date	Theatre	Role	Notes
Othello	March 1937	People's Palace, Mile End	Lodovico	
Arms and the Man	1937	Tour of Scandinavia and the Baltic capitals	Sergius	With Westminster Productions
Outward Bound	1937	Tour of Scandinavia and the Baltic capitals	Henry	With Westminster Productions
Various	1937–1939	Little Theatre, Bristol	Various	In repertory theatre
Without the Prince	April 1940	Whitehall Theatre	PC James Hawkins	
A Doll's House	January 1946	Intimate Theatre	Torvald Helmer	
Dear Murderer	July 1946	Aldwych Theatre	Richard Fenton	
The Fairy-Queen	December 1946	Covent Garden Theatre	Bottom	
Noose	June 1947	Saville Theatre	Captain Hoyle	
Toad of Toad Hall	December 1948	Memorial Theatre, Stratford-on-Avon	Mr. Toad	
A Woman in Love	April 1949	Embassy Theatre	Pascal	
Stratton	October 1949	Touring	Rev John Courtenay	
Toad of Toad Hall	December 1949	Shakespeare Memorial Theatre, Stratford-on-Avon	Mr. Toad	
Ivanov	April 1950	Arts Theatre	Nikolai Ivanov	
Macbeth	June 1950	Arts Theatre	Macduff	
Party Manners	October 1950	Prince's Theatre	Christopher	
Saint's Day	September 1951	Arts Theatre	Paul Southman	
Coriolanus	1952 season	Shakespeare Memorial Theatre, Stratford-on-Avon	Menenius	With the Shakespeare Memorial Theatre Company
As You Like It	1952 season	Shakespeare Memorial Theatre, Stratford-on-Avon	Jaques	With the Shakespeare Memorial Theatre Company
Volpone	1952 season	Shakespeare Memorial Theatre, Stratford-on-Avon	Sir Politic Would-Be	With the Shakespeare Memorial Theatre Company
Hamlet	1953	Edinburgh Festival	Polonius	
Hamlet	1953–1954	The Old Vic	Polonius	with the Old Vic Company
All's Well That Ends Well	1953–1954	The Old Vic	Parolles	with the Old Vic Company
Twelfth Night	1953–1954	The Old Vic	Malvolio	with the Old Vic Company
The Tempest	1953–1954	The Old Vic	Prospero	with the Old Vic Company
Nina	July 1955	Haymarket Theatre	Georges de Fourville	
The Doctor's Dilemma	October 1955	Saville Theatre	Sir Ralph Bloomfield Bonington	
What Shall We Tell Caroline?	April 1958	Lyric Theatre, Hammersmith	Tony Peters	On a double bill with The Dock Brief; transferred to the Garrick Theatre in May 1958
The Dock Brief	April 1958	Lyric Theatre, Hammersmith	Morgenhall	On a double bill with What Shall We Tell Caroline?; transferred to the Garrick Theatre in May 1958
Julius Caesar	Oct 1958	The Old Vic	Cassius	with the Old Vic Company
Ghosts	Oct 1958	The Old Vic	Pastor Manders	with the Old Vic Company
Macbeth	Oct 1958	The Old Vic	Macbeth	with the Old Vic Company
The Magistrate	Oct 1958	The Old Vic	Mr Posket	with the Old Vic Company
Moonbirds	October 1959	Cort Theatre, New York	Alexander Chabert	
Oedipus Rex	April 1960	Sadler's Wells Theatre	Narrator	
Playing With Fire	June 1962	Aldwych Theatre	Father	with the Royal Shakespeare Company
The Collection	June 1962	Aldwych Theatre	Harry	with the Royal Shakespeare Company
Troilus and Cressida	October 1962	Aldwych Theatre	Ulysses	with the Royal Shakespeare Company
The Physicists	January 1963	Aldwych Theatre	Herbert Georg Beutler	with the Royal Shakespeare Company
Saint's Day	May 1965	Royal Theatre	Paul Southman	
Relatively Speaking	March 1967	Duke of York's Theatre	Philip	
Enter a Free Man	March 1968	St Martin's Theatre	George Riley	
A Delicate Balance	January 1969	Aldwych Theatre	Tobias	with the Royal Shakespeare Company
King Lear	October 1969	Nottingham Playhouse, Nottingham	King Lear	Production visited The Old Vic, February 1970
Flint	May 1970	Criterion Theatre		
Jumpers	1972	The Old Vic	George Moore	with the National Theatre company
Richard II	1972	The Old Vic	John of Gaunt	with the National Theatre company
The Cherry Orchard	May 1973	The Old Vic	Leonid Gayev	with the National Theatre company
Stripwell	October 1975	Royal Court Theatre	Graham Stripwell	
Once upon a Time	1976	Bristol Old Vic	Fedya	
The Ordeal of Gilbert Pinfold	1977	Round House Theatre, Manchester	Gilbert Pinfold	then Round House Theatre, London, 1979
The Tempest	1978	Royal Shakespeare Theatre	Prospero	with the Royal Shakespeare Company
Love's Labour's Lost	1978	Royal Shakespeare Theatre	Don Adriano de Armado	with the Royal Shakespeare Company
The Ordeal of Gilbert Pinfold	1979	Round House Theatre	Gilbert Pinfold	
The Rivals	1983	National Theatre	Sir Anthony Absolute	
You Never Can Tell	1987	Haymarket Theatre	William the waiter	
Bookends	1990	Apollo Theatre		
Trelawny of the 'Wells'	1992	Comedy Theatre		

== Filmography ==
Filmography of Hordern
Film	Year	Role	Notes
A Girl Must Live	1939	Cast member	
Band Waggon	1940	Minor Role	Uncredited
The Girl in the News	1940	Assistant Prosecuting Counsel	Uncredited
The Years Between	1946	MP in the House of Commons	Uncredited
A Girl in a Million	1946	Divorce counsel	
School for Secrets	1946	Lieutenant-Commander Lowther	
Mine Own Executioner	1947	Co-counsel at Felix's Hearing	Uncredited
Night Beat	1947	Cast member	Uncredited
Good-Time Girl	1948	Seddon, detective	
The Small Voice	1948	Dr. Mennell	
Third Time Lucky	1949	Second doctor	Uncredited
Portrait from Life	1949	Johnson	
Passport to Pimlico	1949	Bashford	
Train of Events	1949	First plain clothes man	(segment "The Actor")
The Astonished Heart	1950	Ernest	
Trio	1950	Vicar	(in segment The Verger)
Highly Dangerous	1950	Rawlings, director of laboratory	
Flesh and Blood	1951	Webster	
Scrooge	1951	Jacob Marley	
Tom Brown's Schooldays	1951	Wilkes	
The Magic Box	1951	Official receiver	
The Card	1952	Bank manager	Uncredited
The Story of Robin Hood and His Merrie Men	1952	Scathelock	
The Hour of 13	1952	Sir Herbert Frensham	
Street Corner	1953	Detective Inspector Heron	
Grand National Night	1953	Inspector Ayling	
Personal Affair	1953	Headmaster Griffith	
The Heart of the Matter	1953	Commissioner of Police	
You Know What Sailors Are	1954	Captain Hamilton	
Forbidden Cargo	1954	Director	
The Beachcomber	1954	Headman	
Svengali	1954	Billy's Uncle	Uncredited
The Night My Number Came Up	1955	Commander Lindsay	
The Dark Avenger	1955	King Edward III	
The Constant Husband	1955	Judge	
Storm Over the Nile	1955	General Faversham	
The Man Who Never Was	1956	General Coburn	
Alexander the Great	1956	Demosthenes	
Pacific Destiny	1956	Gregory, resident commissioner	
The Baby and the Battleship	1956	Captain Hugh	
The Spanish Gardener	1956	Harrington Brande	
No Time for Tears	1957	Surgeon	
Windom's Way	1957	Patterson	
I Accuse!	1958	Prosecutor	
The Spaniard's Curse	1958	Mr Justice Manton	
Girls at Sea	1958	Admiral Hewitt	
I Was Monty's Double	1958	Rusty	
Sink the Bismarck!	1960	Admiral Sir John Tovey	
Moment of Danger	1960	Inspector Farrell	
Man in the Moon	1960	Dr Davidson	
El Cid	1961	Don Diego	
The Scales of Justice	1962	Opening Credits Narrator	uncredited
The V.I.P.s	1963	Airport director	
Cleopatra	1963	Cicero	
Dr. Syn, Alias the Scarecrow	1963	Sir Thomas Banks	
The Yellow Rolls-Royce	1964	Harmsworth	
Genghis Khan	1965	Geen	
The Spy Who Came In from the Cold	1965	Ashe	
Cast a Giant Shadow	1966	British Ambassador	
Khartoum	1966	Lord Granville	
A Funny Thing Happened on the Way to the Forum	1966	Senex	
The Taming of the Shrew	1967	Baptista	
The Jokers	1967	Sir Matthew	
How I Won the War	1967	General Grapple	
I'll Never Forget What's'isname	1967	Headmaster	
Prudence and the Pill	1968	Dr Morley	Uncredited
Where Eagles Dare	1968	Vice-Admiral Rolland	
The Bed Sitting Room	1969	Captain Bules Martin	
Anne of the Thousand Days	1969	Thomas Boleyn	
Futtocks End	1970	Butler	
Some Will, Some Won't	1970	James Deniston Russell	
Up Pompeii	1971	Ludicrus Sextus	
The Possession of Joel Delaney	1972	Justin Lorenz	
The Pied Piper	1972	Melius	
Demons of the Mind	1972	Priest	
Alice's Adventures in Wonderland	1972	Mock Turtle	
Theatre of Blood	1973	George William Maxwell	
The Mackintosh Man	1973	Brown	
England Made Me	1973	F. Minty	
The Three Musketeers	1973	Treville	Voice, Uncredited
Girl Stroke Boy	1973	George Mason	
Juggernaut	1974	Baker	Uncredited
Royal Flash	1975	Headmaster	
Mister Quilp	1975	Grandfather	
Barry Lyndon	1975	Narrator	Voice
Lucky Lady	1975	Captain Rockwell	
The Slipper and the Rose	1976	King	
Joseph Andrews	1977	Parson Adams	
The Medusa Touch	1978	Fortune teller	
Watership Down	1978	Narrator/Frith	Voice
The Talking Parcel	1978	Oswald, the Sea Serpent	Voice
The Wildcats of St Trinian's	1980	Sir Charles Hackforth	
Ivanhoe	1982	Cedric	
The Missionary	1982	Slatterthwaite	
Gandhi	1982	Sir George Hodge	
Oliver Twist	1982	Mr. Brownlow	
Yellowbeard	1983	Dr Gilpin	
Young Sherlock Holmes	1985	Older John Watson	Voice
Comrades	1986	Mr Pitt	
Lady Jane	1986	Dr Feckenham	
Labyrinth	1986	Wiseman	Voice
Suspicion	1987	Lord McLaidlaw	
The Trouble with Spies	1987	Jason Locke	
The Secret Garden	1987	Ben Weatherstaff	
Diamond Skulls	1989	Lord Crewne	
A Tale of Two Toads	1989	Badger	Voice
The Fool	1990	Mr Tatham	
Beauty and the Beast	1992	Monsieur De Bois	Voice
Freddie as F.R.O.7	1992	King	Voice

== Television ==
Filmography of Hordern
Programme	Year	Role	Notes
BBC Sunday Night Theatre	1950-1959	Various	12 episodes
London Playhouse	1956	Mr. Frisby	Episode: "The Guv'nor"
ITV Play of the Week	1956-1966	Various	11 episodes
Armchair Theatre	1957	Detective Superintendent Coates	Episode: "The Witness"
The Dock Brief	1957	Barrister Wilfred Morganhall	TV film
ITV Television Playhouse	1957-1961	Various	3 episodes
Playhouse 90	1959	Griffith	Episode: "Dark as the Night"
Play of the Week	1959	Wilfred Morganhall/Tony Peters	2 segments
The Dupont Show of the Month	1959	Mr. Brownlow	Episode: Oliver Twist
International Detective	1960	Major Rupert Bexley	Episode: "The Cumberland Case"
BBC Sunday-Night Play	1960	Walter Ormund	Episode: "Twentieth Century Theatre: I Have Been Here Before"
Espionage	1963	Minister	Episode: "The Gentle Spies"
The Magical World of Disney	1963	Squire Thomas Banks	Serial: "The Scarecrow of Romney Marsh"
Festival	1964	Sir August Thwaites	Episode: "August for the People"
First Night	1964	Arthur Walmer	Episode: "Land of My Dreams"
Detective	1964	DI Ranson	Episode: "The Man Who Murdered in Public"
The Wednesday Play	1964-1965	General Kokoshkin/Sir Jocelyn Symonds	2 episodes
Court Martial	1966	Col. Gordon Miller	Episode: "Let No Man Speak"
The Scales of Justice	1966	Opening Narration (uncredited)	Episode: "Company of Fools"
Whistle and I'll Come to You (Omnibus)	1968	Professor Parkin	
Six Dates with Barker	1971	Arch Funster	Episode: "All the World's a Stooge"
A Christmas Carol	1971	Jacob Marley	TV special
BBC Play of the Month	1971-1976	Various	5 episodes
Jackanory	1973-1978	Storyteller	4 stories
Fall of Eagles	1974	Narrator	Miniseries
Edward the Seventh	1975	William Ewart Gladstone	5 episodes
Blue Peter Special Assignment	1976	Charles Darwin (voice)	Episode: "Darwin at Down House"
Paddington	1976-1980	Narrator	
A Christmas Carol	1977	Ebenezer Scrooge	TV film
BBC Television Shakespeare	1978-1982	Capulet/Prospero/King Lear	Episodes: The Tempest and Romeo and Juliet and King Lear
Tales of the Unexpected	1979	Cyril Bixby	Episode: "Mrs. Bixby and the Colonel's Coat"
Shōgun	1980	Friar Domingo	5 episodes
Gauguin the Savage	1980	Durand-Huel	
The History Man	1981	Professor Marvin	3 episodes
BBC2 Playhouse	1981	Patient	Episode: "You're Alright, How Am I?"
Ivanhoe	1982	Cedric	TV film
Oliver Twist	1982	Mr. Brownlow	TV film
Rod and Line	1982	monologues on fishing and philosophy	Produced by Granada
Arena	1983	Mr. A	Episode: "It's All True"
The Wind in the Willows	1983	Badger	TV film
The Zany Adventures of Robin Hood	1984	Rupert	TV film
The Wind in the Willows	1984	Badger	52 episodes
Theatre Night	1985	Sir William Gower	Episode: "Trelawny of the Wells"
Paradise Postponed	1986	Simeon Simcox	10 episodes
Inspector Morse	1987	Dr. Starkie	Episode: "Service of All the Dead"
The Secret Garden	1987	Ben Weatherstaff	TV film
American Playhouse	1987	Lord McLaidlaw	Episode: "Suspicion"
Danny, the Champion of the World	1989	Lord Claybury	TV film
Perfect Scoundrels	1990	Sir Norman	Episode: "The Play's the Sting"
The Green Man	1990	Gramps	2 episodes
Truckers	1992	Abbot of the Stationeri	3 episodes
Screen Two	1992-1995	Godfrey Colston/Lord Langland	2 episodes
Lovejoy	1993	William Shotley	Episode: "Fly the Flag"
Sir Michael's House Party	1993	Himself	Temporary host of Noel's House Party for one episode.
Middlemarch	1994	Peter Featherstone	3 episodes

== Radio broadcasts ==
Radio broadcasts of Michael Hordern
Broadcast	Date	Role	Notes	Refs.
The Sunday Play: "Abraham Lincoln"	14 June 1947	Abraham Lincoln	tbc	
Third Programme: "The Dock Brief"	16 May 1957	Wilfred Morganhall		
Radio drama series: Jeeves & Wooster	1973–1981	Jeeves	8 series and 1 short story	
The Lord of the Rings (1981 radio series)	March-August 1981	Gandalf		
Saturday Night Theatre: "Leave It to Psmith"	3 October 1981	Lord Emsworth		
Globe Theater: "The Miser"	28 September 1986	Harpagon		
Cadfael: "Monk's Hood"	1991	Narrator		
Cadfael: "The Virgin in the Ice"	1992	Narrator		
Drama on 3: "Hamlet, Prince of Denmark"	26 April 1992	Player King		
The Monday Play: "The Importance of Being Earnest"	13 February 1995	Lane		
