= All Things Ransome =

All Things Ransome is an unincorporated association registered in California in 2010. It operates two websites associated with the British author, Arthur Ransome. All Things Ransome is a repository of some of Ransome's very early works and contains published and original articles and other information about Ransome. TarBoard is a discussion board for Ransome related topics. Although there are close connections, All Things Ransome is a completely separate organization from The Arthur Ransome Society (TARS), a British-based literary society focussed on Ransome.

== All Things Ransome ==
All Things Ransome (ATR) originated in a project to save the contents of the TARS website "Literary Pages" which were not included in the new design when the Society's website was updated. The TARS Literary Pages had original articles, contemporary reviews and links to on-line copyright expired ebooks about Ransome or used as sources by Ransome.

All Things Ransome is intended to be a research tool for the works and life of Arthur Ransome, and the sources and influences relevant to his work. ATR also provides a storage for Ransome-related materials, especially for non-ephemeral works, essays, articles, TARS related newsletters etc.. Among the unique items available are some very early Ransome books which have long been out of print but are made available in PDF form with the permission of the Arthur Ransome Literary executors. ATR also has links to many other Arthur Ransome sites available on the internet.

The All Things Ransome and TarBoard sites are linked to by most other Arthur Ransome websites as significant resources. In addition there are links from other sailing and boating related organizations.

== TarBoard ==
TarBoard was originally set up as project of Iain Edmondson-Noble in 1996. It is a discussion board for Arthur Ransome related topics. When Edmondson-Noble decided that he could not continue to operate the discussion board in 2008, TarBoard was taken over by a group of participants. It was then included as one of the operations of All Things Ransome.
