= Clifford Webb =

English artist, illustrator and writer

Clifford Webb RBA 1936, RE 1948 (14 March 1894 – 29 July 1972) was an English artist, illustrator and writer. He specialised in animal drawings.

He was apprenticed as a lithographer, but served in the British Army (Wiltshire Regiment) during World War I and then studied at the Westminster School of Art. He fought at Mons, Gallipoli and in Mesopotamia. He was wounded four times, the most serious of which was a shot to the left side of his jaw, and mentioned in dispatches. From 1917 to 1919, he served as a captain in the Indian Army.

From 1919 to 1922, he studied at the Westminster School of Art under Walter Bayes and Bernard Meninsky and then from 1923 to 1926 he was a part-time lecturer at Central School of Art in Birmingham. His remaining family still reside centrally in the UK and the United States.

Webb produced illustrations for the first two books of the Swallows and Amazons series by Arthur Ransome, which were used in some 1930s editions. Because Ransome did not like those produced by Steven Spurrier for the first book, Swallows and Amazons, those were not used in its first edition (1930), apart from the endpaper map and dust jacket. In 1931 the second edition contained Webb's illustrations, as did the first edition of the sequel, Swallowdale. (Ransome himself was the original illustrator of the third story, Peter Duck, and all that followed. Further, in 1938 he produced illustrations for Swallows and Amazons and Swallowdale, replacing Webb's drawings.)

Issue 67 of The Imaginative Book Illustration Society's Studies in Illustration contains a short biography & full bibliography by Martin Steenson.

In 2019, the wood engraver and writer Simon Brett published The Life and Art of Clifford Webb, the first book devoted to the artist's oeuvre.

== Books ==
=== As writer ===
Webb both wrote and illustrated these children's books

- The Story of Noah
- The Thirteenth Pig 1965
- Butterwick Farm 1933
- Animals from Everywhere 1938
- More Animals from Everywhere 1959
- The Story of Noah 1931
- A Jungle Picnic 1934
- The North Pole Before Lunch 1936
- Magic Island (1956)
- The Friendly Place 1962
- Strange Creatures 1963
- All Kinds of Animals 1970

=== As illustrator ===
Written by Ella Monckton, his wife:

- For the Moon
- The Little Clown
- Dog Toby
- The Boy and the Mountain
- The Top of the Mountain
- The Gates Family
- The Go-To-Bed Book 1935

By other writers:

- Swallow and Amazons: Arthur Ransome, 1930
- Swallowdale : Arthur Ransome, 1931
- An Introduction to India : E. Lucia Turnbull 1933
- A Key to the Countryside : Marcus Woodward 1934
- A Surgeon's China : Albert Gervais 1934
- Words Beasts and Fishes : Marmaduke Dixey 1936
- The Hill Fox : Ernest Blakeman Vesey 1937
- Under the Chesnut Tree : Ida Gandy 1938
- Creatures Great and Small: Theodora Horton 1938
- The Gentle Art of Walking : Geoffrey Murray, 1939
- The Pig who was too thin : Margaret Alleyne 1946
- The Enchanted Glen : Beatrice Carroll 1947
- Moss Green Days : Ralph Wightman 1952
