= Steven Spurrier =

Steven Spurrier may refer to:

- Steven Spurrier (artist) (1878–1961), British artist and painter
- Steven Spurrier (wine merchant) (1941–2021), British wine expert and merchant

== See also ==
- Steve Spurrier (born 1945), American football player and coach
