= Benjamin Warren Couch =

American lawyer and politician

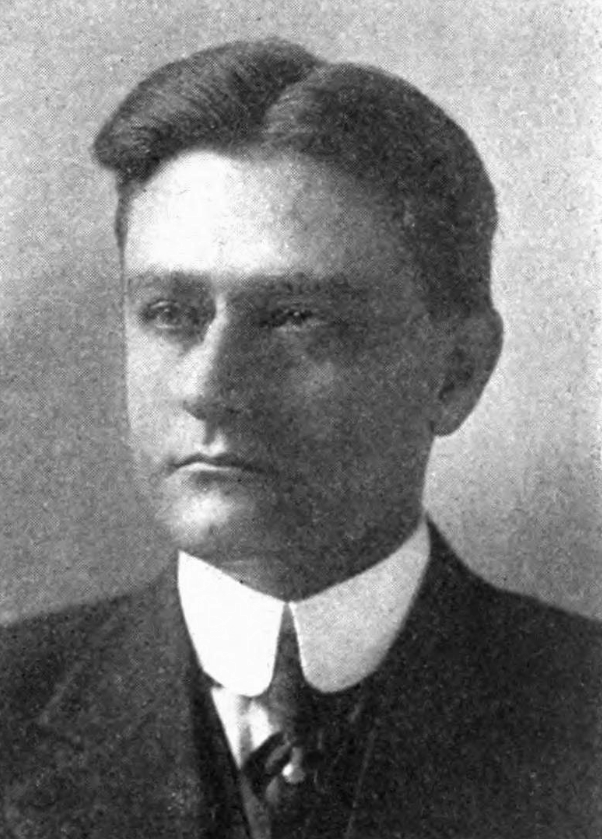

Member of the New Hampshire House of Representatives
- In office 1911–1917

Personal details
- Born: August 19, 1873 Concord, New Hampshire, U.S.
- Died: November 4, 1945 (aged 72) Concord, New Hampshire, U.S.
- Party: Republican
- Education: Dartmouth College; Harvard Law School
- Occupation: Lawyer, politician

Benjamin Warren Couch (August 19, 1873 – November 4, 1945) was a New Hampshire lawyer and politician.

== Biography ==
Benjamin Warren Couch was born in Concord, New Hampshire on August 19, 1873. He was educated at Concord High School, Dartmouth College and Harvard Law School. He then practiced law, eventually becoming a member of the firm of Stevens, Couch and Stevens. A Republican, he served in various local positions in Concord. In 1911 he was elected to the state legislature, where he was chairman of the judiciary committee.

He died in Concord on November 4, 1945.
