= Christopher Gandy =

British soldier, diplomat and art collector

Christopher Thomas Gandy (1917–2009) was a British soldier, diplomat and collector of Islamic art.

== Life ==
Christopher Gandy was the son of the writer Ida Gandy and Thomas Hall Gandy (1876–1948), a GP. He was a direct descendant of the architect Joseph Gandy and Selina Byam, painted by Thomas Gainesborough. His younger siblings were the mathematician Robin Gandy and Gillian Gandy, a pioneer of neonatal intensive care.

Gandy was a diplomat active in Yemen, Libya, and Iran from the 1940s until the 1970s.

He died on 9 December 2009, aged 92. He bequeathed his collection of Islamic art to the Ashmolean Museum. Highlights were exhibited at the Ashmolean in 2014.

== Writings ==
- "The Yemen Revisited". Asian Affairs. 58. October 1971. doi:10.1080/03068377108729585.
- "Clio with One Eye: a New Book on the Armenians in Ottoman Turkey". Journal of the Royal Asiatic Society: 370–7. 1988.
- "A Mission to Yemen: August 1962-January 1963". British Journal of Middle Eastern Studies. 25 (2): 247-74. November 1998. JSTOR 195734.
