= Miss New Hampshire's Teen =

- Formation: 2005
- Type: Beauty pageant
- Location: Derry, New Hampshire
- Members: Miss America's Teen
- Official language: English
- Key people: Pattie Lamontagne, Jill Menard
- Website: Official website

The Miss New Hampshire's Teen competition is the pageant that selects the representative for the U.S. state of New Hampshire in the Miss America's Teen pageant.

Kendall Laroche of Manchester was crowned Miss New Hampshire's Teen on May 1, 2026, at the Stockbridge Theatre in Pinkerton Academy in Derry. She competed for the title of Miss America's Teen 2027 on September 5, 2026, at the Kravis Center for the Performing Arts in West Palm Beach, Florida.

In January 2023, the official name of the pageant was changed from Miss New Hampshire's Outstanding Teen, to Miss New Hampshire's Teen in accordance with the national pageant.

== Results summary ==
The year in parentheses indicates the year of the Miss America's Teen competition the award/placement was garnered.

=== Placements ===
- Miss America's (Outstanding) Teens: Allie Nault (2016)
- Top 7: Morgane Vigroux (2019)
- Top 11: Kendall Laroche (2027)
- Top 15: Lauren April (2011)

=== Awards ===
==== Preliminary awards ====
- Preliminary Evening Wear/On Stage Question: Allie Nault (2016)
- Preliminary Talent: Morgane Vigroux (2019), Kylie Laroche (2025), Kendall Laroche (2027)

==== Other awards ====
- Overall Vocal Talent: Morgane Vigroux (2019)
- Teen in Action Award Winners: Allie Nault (2016)
- Teen in Action Award 2nd Runner-up: Corinne Kelly (2023)
- Teen in Action Award Finalists: Teghan Gregson (2017), Isabel Povey (2022)

== Winners ==
- Declared as winner
- Ended as a runner-up
- Ended as a finalist or semi-finalist

Year	Name	Hometown	Age	Local Title	Talent	Placement at MAO Teen	Special scholarships at MAO Teen	Notes
2026	Kendall Laroche	Manchester	15	Miss Capital Area's Teen	Lyrical Dance	Top 11	Preliminary Talent Award	Younger sister of Miss New Hampshire's Teen 2024, Kylie Laroche
2025	Megan Plaza	Londonderry	15	Miss Capital Area's Teen	Vocal			Later Miss New Hampshire High School America 2026; Top 16 at Miss High School America 2026
2024	Kylie Laroche	Manchester	16	Miss Winnipesaukee's Teen	Lyrical Dance		Preliminary Talent Award	Older sister of Miss New Hampshire's Teen 2026, Kendall Laroche
2023	Siena Lee Muccioli	Manchester	16	Miss Rockingham County's Outstanding Teen	Vocal, "A Change in Me"			Younger sister of Krystal Muccioli, Miss New Hampshire 2010
2022	Corinne Kelly	Pelham	16	Miss Gate City's Outstanding Teen	Irish Dance		Teens in Action 2nd runner-up	Later Miss New Hampshire Volunteer 2025
2020–2021 (Note: State competition took place in 2020, as national pageant postponed to 2021 for the 2022 edition due to the COVID-19 pandemic.)	Isabel Povey	Hampstead	17	Miss Stratham's Outstanding Teen	Jazz Dance, "Think"		Teens in Action Finalist	
2019	Abigail Conard	Amherst	15	Miss Winnipesaukee's Outstanding Teen	Broadway Jazz Dance, "I Am What I Am"			
2018	Morgane Vigroux	Derry	16	Miss Capital Area's Outstanding Teen	Vocal, "California Dreamin' "	Top 7	Overall Vocal Talent Award Preliminary Talent Award	
2017	Kenzie Goode	Londonderry	16	Miss Seacoast's Outstanding Teen	Tap Dance			Miss Stratham 2022
2016	Teghan Gregson	Derry	16	Miss Pembroke's Outstanding Teen	Tap Dance, "Hand Jive"		Teens in Action Award Finalist	
2015	Skylar Rienert	Hooksett	15	Miss Salem's Outstanding Teen	Dance	N/A		Assumed title when Nault was named Miss America's Outstanding Teen 2016
2015	Allie Nault	Gilford	17	Miss Lakes Region's Outstanding Teen	Dance/Twirl	Winner	Preliminary Evening Wear/OSQ Award Teens in Action Award	
2014	Caroline Carter	Dover	16	Miss Greater Derry's Outstanding Teen	Vocal			Later Miss New Hampshire 2016
2013	Kenya Welch	Franklin	17	Miss Lakes Region's Outstanding Teen	Contemporary Dance, "Chasing Cars"			Competed on So You Think You Can Dance
2012	Eileen Kelley	Randolph	17	Miss Strafford County's Outstanding Teen	Vocal, "Part of Your World" from The Little Mermaid			
2011	Lauren Percy	Bow	17	Miss Strafford County's Outstanding Teen	Dance			Later Miss New Hampshire 2017
2010	Lauren April	Auburn	17		Classical Guitar	Top 15		3rd runner-up at Miss New Hampshire 2011 pageant
2009	Katrina Rossi	Hampstead	17	Miss Lakes Region's Outstanding Teen				
2008	Megan Lyman	Gilford	17		Tap Dance, "Baby I'm a Star" by Prince			Contestant at National Sweetheart 2010 pageant Later Miss New Hampshire 2012
2007	Julia Neveu	Manchester	17		Jazz Dance			3rd runner-up at Miss New Hampshire 2012 pageant 4th runner-up at Miss New Hampshire 2013 pageant
2006	Janine Mitchell	Derry	17		Lyrical Dance			
2005	Meghan Lamontagne	Pelham	17		Dance/Twirl			Contestant at National Sweetheart 2009 Purdue University's 25th Golden Girl
