= Swallows and Amazons =

1930 children's novel by Arthur Ransome

- First edition dust jacket cover 1930
- Author: Arthur Ransome
- Illustrator: 1st edition was not illustrated, later editions illustrated by Clifford Webb and later Arthur Ransome
- Cover artist: Steven Spurrier
- Language: English
- Series: Swallows and Amazons series
- Genre: Children's, adventure novel
- Publisher: Jonathan Cape
- Publication date: 21 July 1930
- Publication place: United Kingdom
- OCLC: 5973192
- Followed by: Swallowdale

Swallows and Amazons is a children's adventure novel by English author Arthur Ransome first published on 21 July 1930 by Jonathan Cape. Set in the summer of 1929 in the Lake District, the book introduces the main characters of John, Susan, Titty and Roger Walker (Swallows); as well as their mother, Mary; and their baby sister, Bridget (nicknamed Vicky). We also meet Nancy and Peggy Blackett (Amazons); their uncle Jim (James Turner), commonly referred to as Captain Flint; and their widowed mother, Molly Blackett. It is the first book in the Swallows and Amazons series, followed by Swallowdale.

At the time, Ransome had been working as a journalist with the Manchester Guardian, but decided to become a full-time author rather than go abroad as a foreign correspondent. He did continue to write part-time for the press, however.

The book was inspired by a summer spent by Ransome teaching the children of his friends, the Altounyans, to sail. Three of the Altounyan children's names are adopted directly for the Walker family. Ransome and Ernest Altounyan bought two small dinghies called Swallow and Mavis. Ransome kept Swallow until he sold it a number of years later, while Mavis remained in the Altounyan family and is now on permanent display in the Ruskin Museum. However, later in life Ransome tried to downplay the Altounyan connections, changing the initial dedication of Swallows and Amazons and writing a new foreword which gave other sources. In 2003, the novel was listed at number 57 on the BBC's survey The Big Read.

== Plot summary ==
The book relates the outdoor adventures and play of two families of children. These involve sailing, camping, fishing, exploration and piracy. The Walker children (John, Susan, Titty and Roger) are staying at a farm near a lake in the Lake District of England, during the school holidays. They sail a borrowed dinghy named Swallow and meet the Blackett children (Nancy and Peggy), who sail a dinghy named Amazon. The Walkers camp on an island (which the Blacketts named "Wild Cat Island") in the lake, while the Blacketts live in their mainland house nearby. When the children meet, they agree to join forces against a common enemy – the Blacketts' uncle Jim Turner whom they call "Captain Flint" (after the parrot in Treasure Island). Turner, normally an ally of his nieces, has withdrawn from their company to write his memoirs, and has become decidedly unfriendly. Furthermore, when the Blacketts let off a firework on his houseboat roof, it is the Walkers who get the blame. He refuses even to listen when they try to pass on a warning to him about actual real-life burglars in the area.

To determine who should be the overall leader in their campaign against Captain Flint, the Blacketts and the Walkers have a contest to see which can capture the others' boat. As part of their strategy, the Walkers make a dangerous crossing of the lake by night, and John is later cautioned by his mother for this reckless act. The Walkers nevertheless win the contest – thanks to Titty who seizes the Amazon when the Blacketts secretly come to Wild Cat Island in hopes of capturing the Swallow. During the same night Titty hears suspicious voices coming from a different island – Cormorant Island – and in the morning it transpires that Turner's houseboat has been burgled, and his locked sea-chest stolen. Turner again blames the Walkers, but is finally convinced that he was mistaken and penitently reconciles with all the children, also feeling that he was wrong to distance himself from his nieces' adventures all summer. The Swallows, Amazons, and Turner join forces to investigate Cormorant Island, but they cannot find Turner's missing trunk.

The following day, there is a mock battle between Turner and the children, after which Turner is tried for his "crimes" (grouchy attitude, neglectful behaviour, etc.) and forced to walk the plank on his own houseboat. They agree at the post-battle feast that on the final day of their holidays, Titty and Roger will go back to Cormorant Island while the others go fishing. Titty finds the trunk, which contains the memoirs on which Turner had been working, and is rewarded with the overjoyed Turner's green parrot for a pet.

James Turner appears in some ways to be modelled on Ransome himself. The story, set in August 1929, includes a good deal of everyday Lakeland life from the farmers to charcoal burners working in the woods; corned beef, which the children fancifully refer to as pemmican, and ginger beer and lemonade, which they call grog, appear as regular food stuff for the campers; island life also allows for occasional references to the story of Robinson Crusoe.

== Major characters ==
John Walker
Eldest of the Walkers and captain of the Swallow
Susan Walker
Second eldest of the Walkers and mate of the Swallow
Titty Walker
Able Seaman of the Swallow. This name was the nickname of the real life Mavis Altounyan, from Joseph Jacobs's children's story Titty Mouse and Tatty Mouse. It was changed to Kitty in the original BBC adaptation of the book, and Tatty for a 2016 BBC Films adaptation
Roger Walker
Youngest of the sailing Walkers and ship's boy of the Swallow. His name is taken from the real life Roger Altounyan who later became a pioneering researcher of treatments for asthma.
Bridget Walker
Youngest of the Walkers, and ship's baby of the Swallow. Nicknamed Vicky due to a resemblance to pictures of Queen Victoria in old age.
Nancy "Ruth" Blackett
Captain of the Amazon.
Peggy "Margaret" Blackett
Nancy's younger sister and mate of the Amazon
James Turner
Nancy and Peggy's uncle. Known to the children as "Captain Flint", and to the Blacketts as "Uncle Jim".

== Setting ==
According to Ransome, every place in his book can be found in the Lake District, but he took different locations and placed them in different ways: the lake is a fictionalised version of Windermere but the surrounding countryside more closely resembles that around Coniston. Wild Cat Island, the location of the island camp, has elements from Peel Island in Coniston and Blake Holme (or Blakeholme) in Windermere.

Holly Howe, the farmhouse of the Jacksons where the Swallows stay, is based on Bank Ground Farm, which exists to this day. It was featured in the 1974 film.

The main town on the lake is called Rio by the children but has a "native name"; it is based on the twin towns of Bowness-on-Windermere on Windermere lake and the nearby town of Windermere. They call the main fell or mountain near the lake Kanchenjunga (the Amazons' parents and uncle called it the Matterhorn); it is based on the Old Man of Coniston near Coniston Water. The branch railway to Rio runs ten miles from Strickland Junction, based on Oxenholme near Kendal.

== Illustrations ==
The artist chosen for the first edition of the book was Steven Spurrier, but Ransome objected to his style and so the first edition did not have any illustrations. Spurrier's drawing for the dust jacket had to be used. The second edition contained drawings by Clifford Webb but after Ransome successfully illustrated Peter Duck himself, he decided to do his own drawings for all the books, including those already published, and Webb's drawings were replaced in later editions.

== Critical reception ==
Reviewing the book for the U.K. daily newspaper The Manchester Guardian (forerunner of The Guardian) Malcolm Muggeridge wrote:

Children's books are probably the most difficult of all to write; they are certainly the most difficult to review. For children alone can properly judge their worth, and children, very wisely, never review. An adult has to refer back to his own childhood and ask himself: Would I have enjoyed such a book then? The answer, in the case of Swallow and Amazons, [sic] is very definitely, Yes. Moreover, the book is entirely charming quite apart from its qualities as child literature. This is rare; for, generally speaking, nothing makes drearier reading than the conscious juvenility of adults.

Muggeridge continued,

Mr. Ransome has the same magical power that Lewis Carroll had of being the child in terms of himself. He never talks down; never finds it necessary to be patronising or sentimental. And sentimentality is the most terrible pitfall that besets those who venture into the world of play. […] Captain John and Mate Susan, and Able-seaman Titty, and Ship's Boy Roger are not at all like Christopher Robin. [T]hey are children. And the story of their adventures on a little island in the middle of an English lake is thrilling just because it is not fabulous. […] It is make-believe such as all children have indulged in: even children who have not been so fortunate as to have a lake and a boat and an island but only a backyard amongst the semis of Suburbia.

More recently, The Washington Post commented that "With a few exceptions, adventure in contemporary children’s literature is safely relegated to the past, or the realms of fantasy, facilitated by wizardry (Harry Potter) or demi-gods (Percy Jackson). Swallows and Amazons contains no sorcery; its plot is plausible, its characters ordinary children. Therein lies its enduring magic. A celebration of friendship, imagination, fair play, and exploration, Swallows and Amazons inspires even the most landlocked kid to dream of messing about in boats, building fires, camping out and navigating by the stars."

== Adaptations ==
=== Radio ===
In 1936 the BBC broadcast Swallows and Amazons as a "dialogue story" in five weekly episodes during The Children's Hour on the BBC National Programme (later known as the BBC Home Service). The book was adapted by Barbara Sleigh.

From 9 October 1947 up to and including 22 January 1948 Swallows and Amazons was adapted into fifteen episodes and read by Derek McCulloch (Uncle Mac) during Children's Hour on the BBC Home Service

=== Television ===
In 1963, the BBC produced an adaptation, Swallows and Amazons, with John Paul as "Captain Flint" and Susan George as the renamed "Kitty". The series was directed by Peter Saunders.

=== Film ===
EMI released a version in 1974, directed by Claude Whatham and produced by Richard Pilbrow. The film starred Virginia McKenna (Mrs. Walker) and Ronald Fraser (Uncle Jim), and Sophie Neville (Titty), Zanna Hamilton (Susan), Simon West (John) and Stephen Grendon (Roger) as the Swallows.

The 2016 film was directed by Philippa Lowthorpe and written by Andrea Gibb. The film stars Andrew Scott, Rafe Spall, Kelly Macdonald, Jessica Hynes, and Harry Enfield.

=== Other versions ===
In August 1999 BBC Radio 4 broadcast a radio adaptation by David Wood with Jean Anderson as Titty seventy years later narrating. Young Titty was played by Phoebe Phillips, John by John Paul Ekins, Susan by Flora Harris, Roger by Joe Sowerbutts, mother by Penny Downie, Nancy by Catherine Poole, Peggy by Jackie Swainson and Uncle Jim by Nicholas Le Prevost.

The Royal National Theatre started developing a musical version of Swallows and Amazons in 2007. Helen Edmundson wrote the book and lyrics while The Divine Comedy's frontman Neil Hannon wrote the music. The musical premiered at the Bristol Old Vic on 1 December 2010 and played at the Vaudeville Theatre, in London's West End, from 15 December 2011, prior to going on tour around the UK from January to May 2012. The production features adults playing the children and has been received favourably by reviewers.

== Publication details ==
- 1930, UK, Jonathan Cape, Pub date 21 July 1930, hardback (First edition, unillustrated)
- 1931, UK, Jonathan Cape, Pub date 1931, hardback (First "Clifford Webb" illustrated edition)
- 1931, US, J.B.Lippincott company, Philadelphia, 1931. Hardback, no full illustrations, front and back plates plus chapter headings by Helene Carter.
- 1938, UK, Jonathan Cape, Pub date 1938, hardback (First "Ransome" illustrated edition)
- 1958, US, Lippincott Williams & Wilkins (ISBN 0-397-30015-8), Pub date ? June 1958, hardback
- 1994, US, David R. Godine, Publisher (ISBN 978-1-56792-420-6), paperback
- 1995, UK, ISIS Audio Books (ISBN 1-85695-974-0), Pub date August 1995, audio book cassette (unabridged)
- 1999, UK, Jonathan Cape (ISBN 0-224-60631-X), Pub date 1999, hardback
- 2001, UK, Red Fox Classics (ISBN 0-09-950391-3), Pub date 5 April 2001, paperback
- 2001, UK, Red Fox (ISBN 0-09-942733-8), Pub date 5 October 2001, paperback
- 2005, UK, Gabriel Woolf (ISBN 0-9550529-0-4), Pub date July 2005, audio book CD
- 2010, US, David R. Godine, Publisher (ISBN 978-1567924206), Pub date 16 July 2010, paperback revised edition

== See also ==
- List of characters in Arthur Ransome books
- Roger Altounyan – real-life scientist; Ransome named characters in the story after Altounyan and his sisters.
- Swallows and Amazons series
