= Trish Regan =

American television host and author

- Born: Patricia Ann Regan; December 13, 1972 (age 53); Hampton, New Hampshire, U.S.
- Education: Columbia University (BA)
- Occupation: Podcaster
- Notable credit: Trish Regan Primetime
- Spouse: James A. Ben
- Children: 3
- Website: www.76research.com

Patricia Ann "Trish" Regan (born December 13, 1972) is a conservative American Podcaster, author, and former business correspondent and television talk-show host. She hosted Trish Regan Primetime on the Fox Business Network from 2015 to 2020.

Regan was previously a television host on Bloomberg Television from 2012 to 2015, and a host at CNBC from 2007 to 2012. She was also a host on Fox Business and a contributor on Fox News until March 2020.

== Early life and education ==
Regan attended and graduated from Phillips Exeter Academy in Exeter, New Hampshire, graduating in 1991. Regan was Miss New Hampshire and represented her home state in the Miss America 1994 pageant. She went on to study voice in Graz, Austria, and at the New England Conservatory of Music in Boston before enrolling at Columbia. She graduated from Columbia with a Bachelor of Arts in history in 2000.

== Career ==
=== CBS (2001–07) ===
Regan started her broadcasting career in 2001 at CBS MarketWatch, then owned partially by CBS News, where she was a business correspondent reporting for the CBS Evening News through 2007. She also contributed to Face the Nation and 48 Hours. Her work on the terror connection between the Tri-Border region of South America and Islamic terrorist groups earned her an Emmy nomination for Investigative Reporting in 2007.

While working at CBS News, Regan was a correspondent for CBS MoneyWatch. In 2002, she earned the Most Outstanding Young Broadcast Journalist Award from the Northern California Society of Professional Journalists for her work there.

=== CNBC (2007–12) ===
During her tenure at CNBC, Regan hosted a daily-markets show and created documentary long-form programming for the network. Regan was nominated for a Best Documentary Emmy Award while also earning a Gerald Loeb nomination for her documentary work on "Against the Tide: The Battle for New Orleans" – an investigative piece on the New Orleans levee system, after Hurricane Katrina.

=== Bloomberg Television (2012–15) ===
Regan was an anchor at Bloomberg Television, where she hosted the daily global market show, Street Smart with Trish Regan.

=== Fox Business and Fox News (2015–2020) ===
Regan joined Fox News and Fox Business in 2015, serving as anchor for The Intelligence Report with Trish Regan weekdays. She switched to a traditional conservative talk format for a new primetime show in 2018, titled Trish Regan Primetime.

==== Denmark comments ====
In August 2018, Regan likened Denmark to Venezuela. Regan said Denmark's economic model was unfeasible and argued, "there's something rotten in Denmark". During the segment, Regan sought to demonstrate that the economic model in Denmark was unfeasible. She made a number of misleading claims about Denmark, including: "everyone in Denmark is working for the government" and "no one wants to work". The segment stirred controversy in both Denmark and the U.S., with news outlets, politicians, experts, and the Danish government noting that, relative to the United States, Denmark is ranked higher on indicators of economic freedom, ease-of-doing-business, and happiness, and has higher employment figures. Regan's figures about Danish unemployment were only correct if she included unemployed babies, children, and retired people; Denmark's unemployment rate was actually lower than that of the U.S. Danish Social Democrat politician Dan Jørgensen ridiculed and criticized Regan's remarks, calling them "untrue." Regan also said, "nobody graduates from school" because the government "pays" students to go to school; according to The Washington Post, while direct comparisons are difficult, fewer than 60% of US college students finish in six years, whereas in Denmark, 79% of undergraduates finish their coursework. The paper noted that this includes American students who cannot afford college in the United States.

After her remarks were criticized in the US and Danish press, Regan attempted to clarify her remarks, saying: "Just to be clear, I was never implying that conditions in Denmark were similar in any way to the current tragedy on the ground there in Venezuela". She added, "I was merely pointing out, using reports from The Atlantic, The Independent, and other publications, that socialism is not the way." These sources have since rebutted Regan's claim, stating, "Our articles do not show that socialism does not definitively work".

==== Coronavirus ====
On March 9, 2020, amid a coronavirus outbreak, Regan said Democrats had exploited the crisis for political gain as Fox Business ran a chyron saying "Coronavirus Impeachment Scam." Regan said, "The chorus of hate being leveled at the President is nearing a crescendo as Democrats blame him, and only him, for a virus that originated halfway around the world. This is yet another attempt to impeach the President, and sadly it seems they care very little for any of the destruction they are leaving in their wake." Shortly thereafter, Fox Business put her show on hiatus after the March 12 broadcast, and on March 27, it was reported that Fox Business had parted ways with her.

=== Podcaster (2021–) ===
Regan started her own podcast, the "Trish Regan Show" in 2021 and runs TARM holdings, the multi-media company that produces it. She was an Executive Editor at the monthly online magazine American Consequences.
