= Deborah Jean Howard =

American model

- Born: February 13, 1967; Concord, New Hampshire
- Died: July 24, 2009 (aged 42); New Hampton, New Hampshire
- Education: Plymouth State University
- Beauty pageant titleholder
- Title: Miss New Hampshire 1991
- Major competition: Miss America 1992

Deborah Jean Howard (February 13, 1967 – July 24, 2009) was an American beauty pageant titleholder. She was crowned Miss New Hampshire 1991 and competed for the Miss America 1992 title. Howard was a graduate of Concord High School in Concord, New Hampshire, and Plymouth State University in Plymouth, New Hampshire. She earned a bachelor's degree in English in 1989 and a master's degree in special education in 2007. After her reign, she continued acting, singing, and dancing in community productions and teaching Sunday school. She became a school teacher and a drama coach. She died on July 24, 2009, in a car accident on Interstate 93. She was 42.

Preceded by Melanie Denise Bridges	Miss New Hampshire; 1991	Succeeded by Rachel Alice Petz
