= Arthur Ransome Club =

Club

ARC logo

The Arthur Ransome Club ((アーサー・ランサム・クラブ: Āsā Ransamu Kurabu)), ARC was founded in Tokyo, Japan, in 1987. It is believed to be the first organization dedicated to promoting and celebrating the works of Arthur Ransome. Its members refer to themselves as "Ransomites" ("Ransamaito").

== History ==
The club was founded in 1987 by Tamami Nakayama.

The club celebrated its 10th anniversary in 1997 at the "10-Gong Festival" in a central Tokyo hotel. Members of "The Arthur Ransome Society" were in attendance and a presentation of the newly published book Arthur Ransome and the Japanese connection was made to each ARC member.

== ARC now ==
ARC publishes a yearly journal called 1929.
