= Concord High School (New Hampshire) =

Location
- 170 Warren St. Concord, New Hampshire; United States
- Coordinates: 43°12′02″N 71°33′06″W

Information
- Type: Public High School
- Motto: Latin: Scientia, Concordia, Sapientia (Knowledge, Harmony and Wisdom)
- Established: 1846; 180 years ago
- Status: Currently operational
- School district: Concord School District
- NCES District ID: 3302460
- NCES School ID: 330246000055
- Principal: Timothy Herbert
- Teaching staff: 112.00 (FTE)
- Grades: 9–12
- Enrollment: 1,448 (2023-2024)
- Student to teacher ratio: 12.93
- Campus: Suburban
- Colors: Crimson and White
- Athletics: Crimson Tide
- Mascot: Tidy the Duck
- Yearbook: The Crimson
- Affiliation: Concord School District
- Website: chs.sau8.org
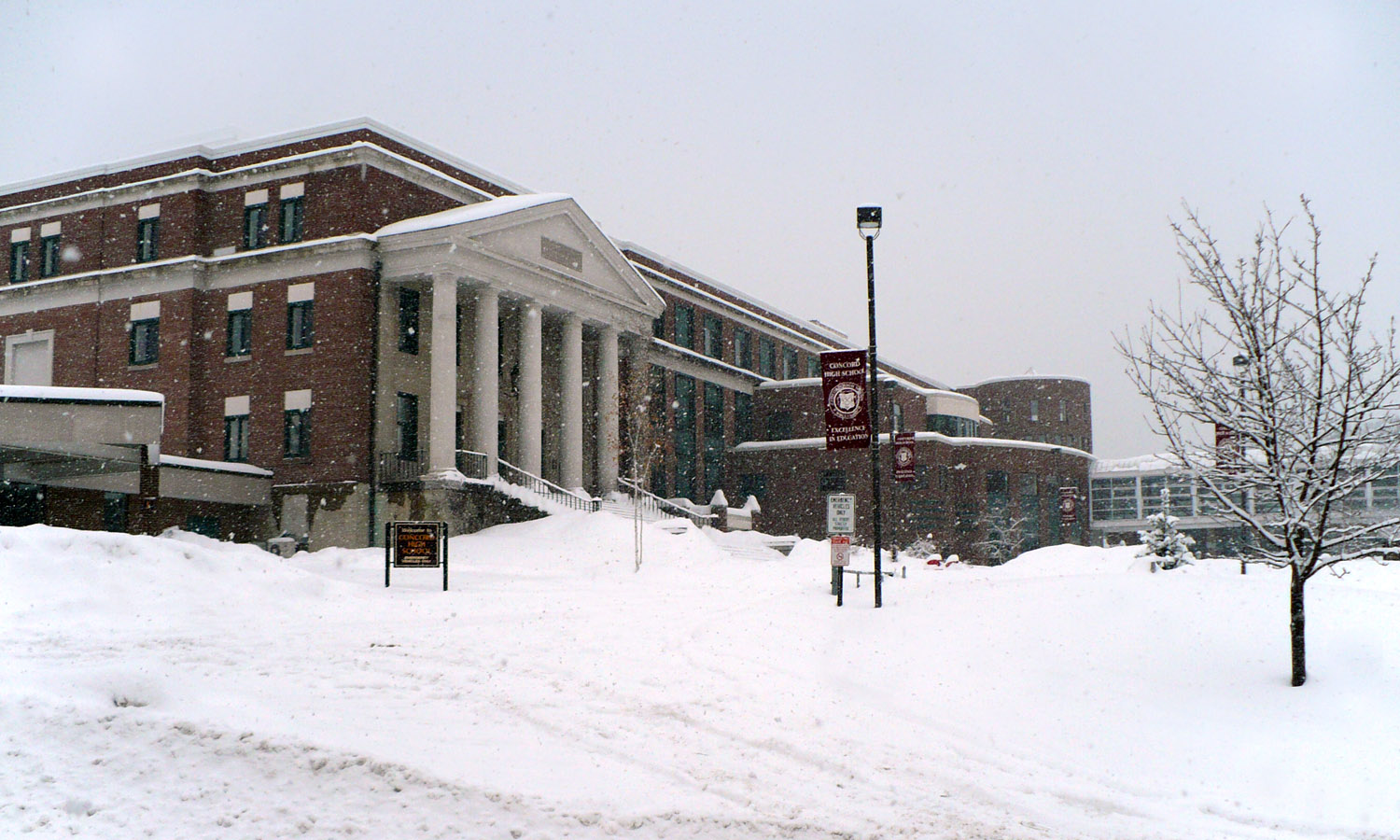
- Concord High School during a 2007 snowstorm

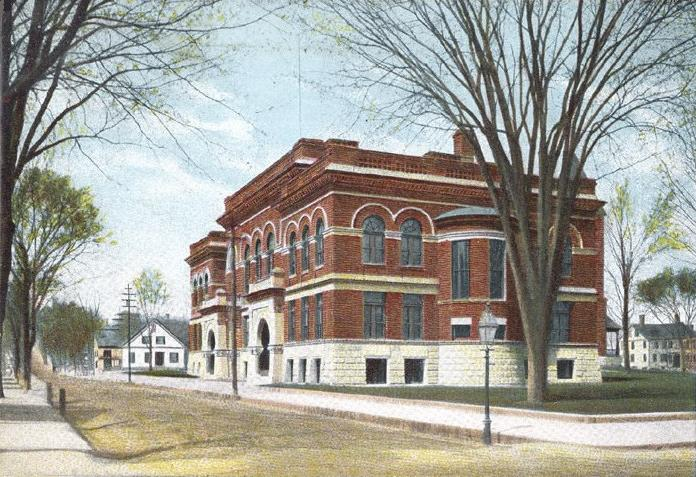
- The former high school on State and School streets, completed in 1890, as it appeared in 1907

Concord High School is a public high school in Concord, New Hampshire, in the United States.

== History ==
Concord's first public high school was established in 1846. The original building was the building on the corner of State and School streets. A new school house was built in 1862, which stood until April 1888, when it burned down during a fire started by a chemistry experiment. For the next two years, students took their classes in City Hall. A new high school was built on the same lot, completed and dedicated in September 1890. In 1907, yet another Concord High School, designed to accommodate 500 students, was built on Spring Street in the building which became Kimball School. (The building was demolished in 2012 to make way for the new Christa McAuliffe Elementary School.) The current high school was built in 1927 on Warren Street, with new wings added in 1960 and 1996.

Some of the features that Concord High currently has are a new media center (library), student center (cafeteria), performing arts area, and four commons areas, each with its own administrative and student community where student lockers were located. ConcordTV, the local public, educational, and government access (PEG) cable TV station for Concord, is currently located in Concord High. There is a bridge/connector between two wings, east and west, of the building.

== Principals ==
Charles C. Cook was Headmaster for thirty years from 1906 to 1936. Cook began the National Honor Society Chapter which still exists at Concord High School. Other long-serving principals include John E. Reed who was principal from 1939 to 1960, J. Preston Barry from 1963 to 1972, Charlie Foley who was principal from 1973 to 1990, Gene Connolly who was principal from 2001 to 2016. Edward W. Crawford died in office in 1962 after serving several years as a very popular principal. Some of the more recent principals of the school include Tom Sica from 2016 to 2020, Michael Reardon from 2020 to 2024 and Timothy Herbert 2025–Present.

In the recent history of Concord High School, Dr. Christine Rath (principal from 1991 to 1997) oversaw the transformation of the school from a three-year to a four-year school which included ninth-grade students. At the same time Rath assisted in the design of the current high school building which was able to accommodate every high school student in Concord.

== Athletics ==
The current athletic director is Stephen Largy.

Some athletic teams that Concord High School has are hockey, cross country, football, wrestling, golf and soccer.

== Notable events ==
On December 3, 1985, a 16 year old dropout named Louis Cartier entered the building with a shotgun, and was promptly killed by Concord police officers. No other fatalities occurred in the shooting, other than Cartier.

During the 1999-2000 school year, teacher Joanne McGlynn's media literacy class gained nationwide prominence when its students fact-checked claims made in the media about a quote regarding the "Love Canal" that Al Gore had made when addressing the school.

At Concord High's first dance of the 2006–2007 school year, the school drew local media attention when administration ejected about a dozen students for grinding, a style of dancing that the administration deemed overly sexual for a school function. In protest of this, about 150 other students walked out of the dance. The administration met with student body leaders to try to reach an agreement. They were not able to, and for the first time in the school's history, the homecoming dance was postponed, and every other dance that year was canceled. An exception was made for the senior prom, however.

Another notable event which occurred at Concord High School was the resignation of Principal Tom Sica. Sica had been the principal of Rundlett Middle School before moving up to Concord High School in 2016. During his time as principal at Rundlett, allegations of sexual assault and misconduct were placed upon a teacher, Howie Leung. The student who brought this to Sica's attention was promptly suspended for three days for "spreading 'malicious and slanderous gossip'". Once he had moved to the high school, news of this suspension, and the circumstances surrounding it, were brought to the public, leading to outrage in the Concord community. Leung was arrested in 2019 for sexual assault charges, and pled "not guilty".

== Notable alumni and faculty ==
- John Adams, composer
- Matt Bonner, former basketball player for the San Antonio Spurs
- Edward H. Brooks (1893–1978), officer in the United States Army and veteran
- Elizabeth Eaton Converse, later known as Connie Converse, singer-songwriter
- Deborah Jean Howard, Miss New Hampshire 1991
- Sam Knox, American football player
- Louise Lamprey (1869-1951), prolific author of books for children
- Joe Lefebvre, Major League Baseball outfielder from 1980 to 1986
- Guor Marial, South Sudanese marathon runner
- Christa McAuliffe, teacher who died in the Space Shuttle Challenger disaster (STS-51-L)
- Fanny E. Minot (1847-1919), valedictorian, 1865; national president, Woman's Relief Corps, 1904
- Tara Mounsey, Olympic hockey player
- Brian Sabean, general manager for the San Francisco Giants
- David Souter, Associate Justice of the Supreme Court of the United States
