= Nancy Blackett (cutter) =

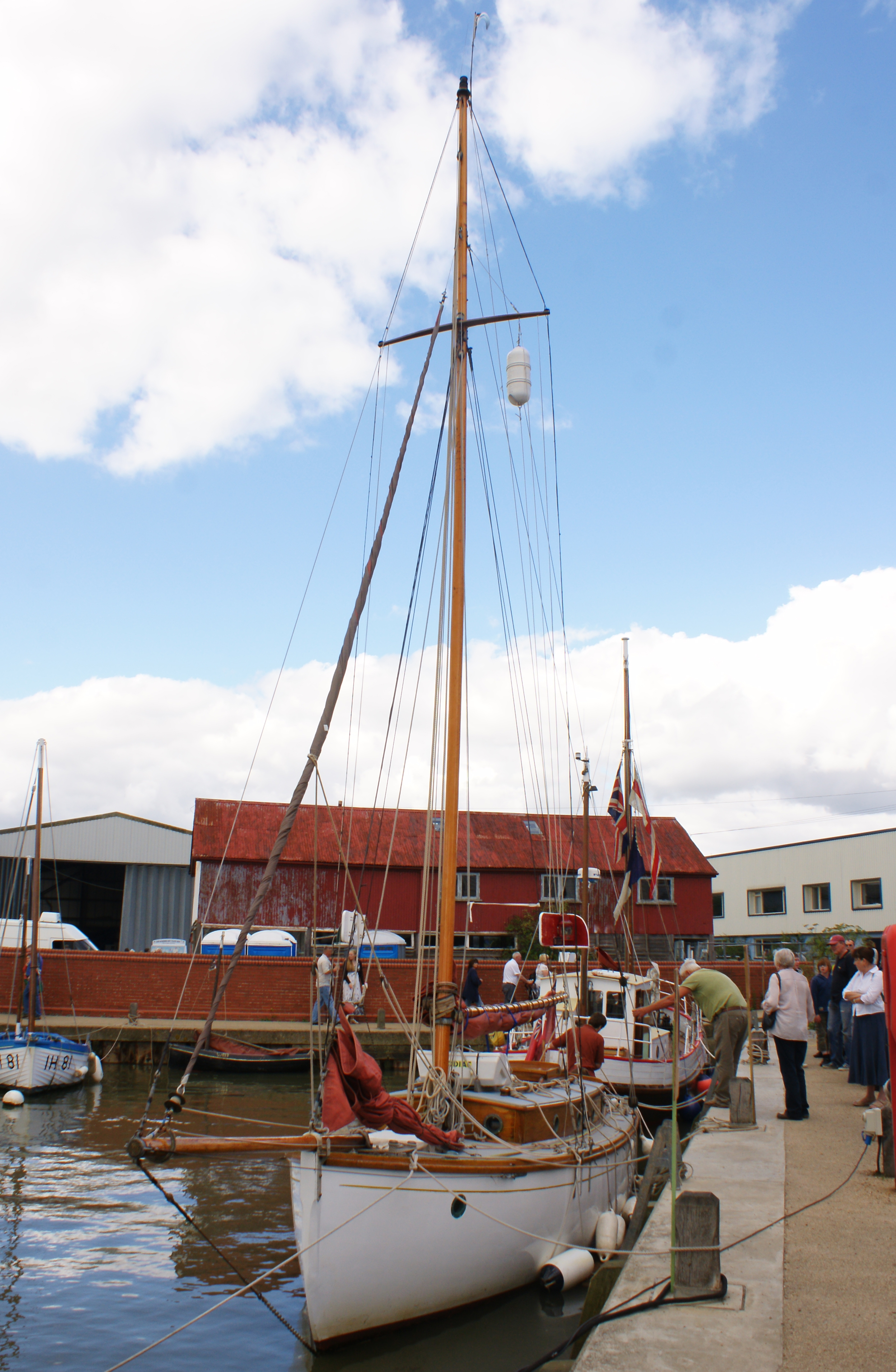
- Nancy Blackett at Woodbridge, Suffolk, in 2009.

History

United Kingdom
- Name: Nancy Blackett
- Owner: The Nancy Blackett Trust
- Builder: David Hillyard
- Launched: 1931
- Acquired: 1934 by Arthur Ransome
- Home port: Pin Mill
- Status: Owned and operated by The Nancy Blackett Trust

General characteristics
- Type: Cutter
- Tonnage: 7 tons (Thames Measurement)
- Length: 28 ft (8.5 m)
- Sail plan: Bermuda-rigged cutter

Nancy Blackett is a 28-foot (8.5 m), 7-ton (Thames Measurement), Bermuda rigged sailing cutter built in 1931. The boat is now owned and operated by The Nancy Blackett Trust.

Built by David Hillyard and originally named Spindrift at her launch in 1931 (and then renamed Electron by her next owner), she was bought by children's author Arthur Ransome in 1934 and renamed Nancy Blackett after the major character of the same name in his Swallows and Amazons series of children's books. He sailed her mostly on the east coast of England and the southern North Sea from her home port of Pin Mill near Harwich.

She is most notable for being the original of the fictional yacht Goblin in Ransome's book We Didn’t Mean to Go to Sea (1937), which recounts a voyage across the North Sea to the Dutch port of Vlissingen, called by the English name of Flushing in the book. Ransome made a similar voyage from Harwich to the Netherlands in 1936 and used his personal experience in the book.

Ransome's cruises also provided material for another book Secret Water (1939) set in the Walton backwaters.

Ransome sold Nancy Blackett in 1939 but always said that she was "the best little ship". In 1988, she was found rotting in Scarborough and subsequently purchased and restored. Following the restoration, she was sold to a private owner, who put her up for sale again in 1996. An appeal to Arthur Ransome fans raised the asking price and she was purchased and a Trust set up which owns, operates and maintains her.

The Nancy Blackett Trust was formed as a registered charity to preserve and sail her and to promote the sort of sailing activities dear to Ransome. The trust's patron is Ellen MacArthur. There have been some modern equipment updates to allow for her safe use by Trust members. She is available for sailing trips as well as appearing at maritime festivals and events and events associated with Ransome.
