= Ida Gandy =

English social worker and author

Ida Caroline Gandy, née Hony (1885–1977), was an English social worker and author. She wrote children's books, plays, and books about rural life in Wiltshire and Shropshire.

== Life ==
Ida Hony was born in 1885 in Bishops Cannings, Wiltshire, where her father, the Rev. Charles William Hony, was the vicar. Annie Elizabeth Lewin, her "somewhat unconventional" mother, was a writer. Hony moved to London to take up social work, working for the Workers' Educational Association. After moving to Peppard in Oxfordshire, she married the local GP, Thomas Gandy, in 1915. The couple had three children: the diplomat Christopher Gandy, the mathematician Robin Gandy and the physician Gillian Gandy.

Ida Gandy wrote stage plays for the local amateur drama group, and published her first non-fiction book, A Wiltshire Childhood, in 1930. In 1930 she persuaded her husband to move to Clunbury in Shropshire. She was active in the local Women's Institute, and during World War II was the Billeting Officer for the Clun Valley. On her husband's retirement in 1945 the couple moved to Dorset. He died in 1948, and after his death Gandy returned to Wiltshire, settling in Aldbourne.

She died in September 1977, and is buried in the churchyard of the Church of St Michael, Aldbourne.

== Works ==
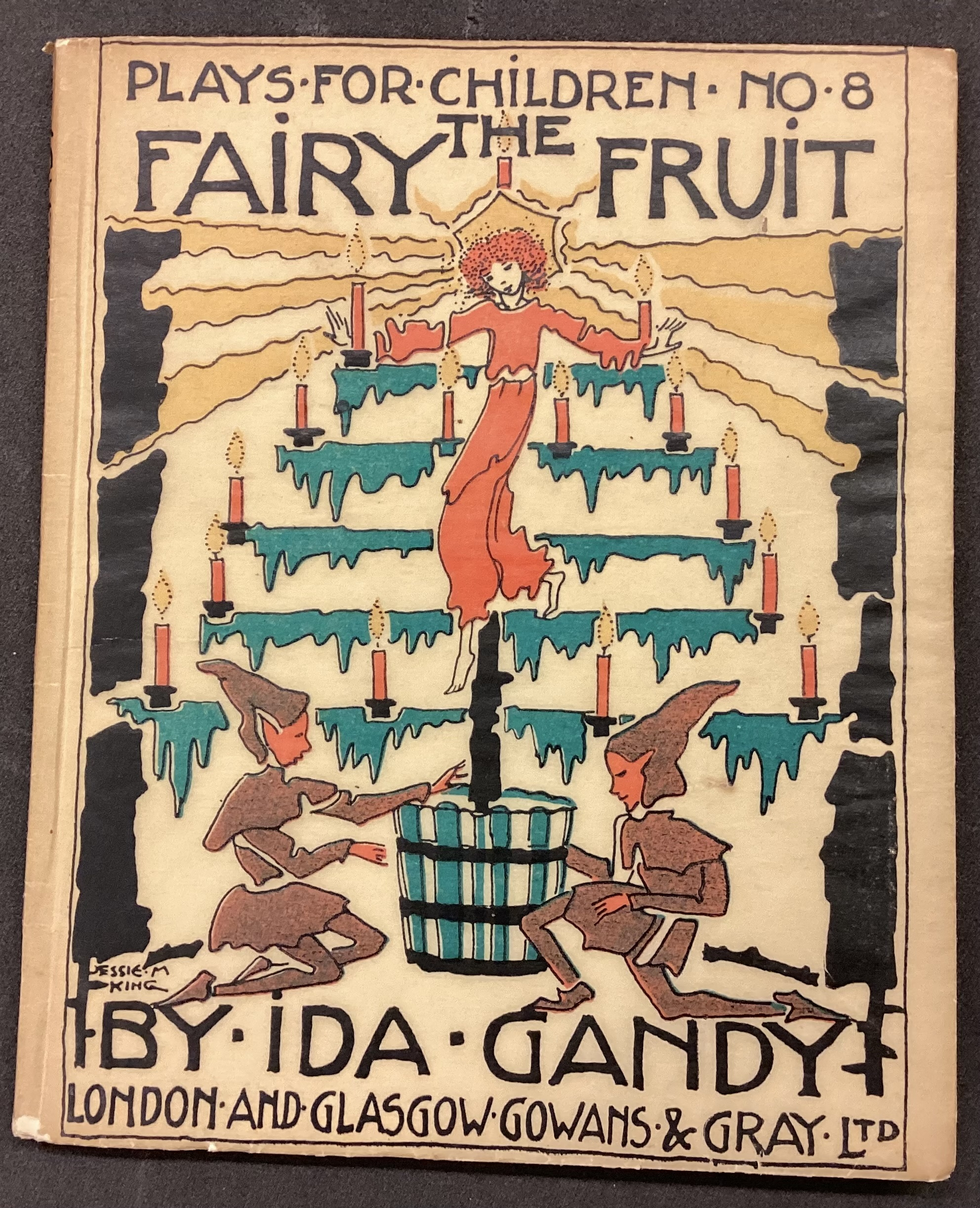
The Fairy Fruit

- The deer stealers: a village play in three acts. London: Village Drama Society.
- The gipsy Countess : a play founded on the old folk-song "The wraggle-taggle gipsies". Kelly: Village Drama Society, 1924.
- Snowdrop and the dwarfs: a fairy play. London: Gowans & Gray, 1925.
- The fairy fruit: a play for children. London: Gowans & Gray, 1927.
- Three bold explorers : a story for children. London: Jarrolds, 1927.
- A good shepherd: a one-act play. London: Joseph Williams, 1927.
- Lardy cake: a comedy for village players. London: H. F. W. Deane, 1928.
- The stranger: a comedy in one act. London: H. F. W. Deane & Sons, 1929.
- Sunset Island. London: Oxford University Press, 1929. Illustrated by Frank Adams.
- A Wiltshire childhood. London: Allen & Unwin, 1929.
- When the queen passed by : an outdoor play in three scenes. London: H. F. W. Deane & Sons, 1932.
- The musical-box : a fantasy in one act. London: H. F. W. Deane & Sons, 1933.
- He boxed her ears: a farce in rhyme. London: H. F. W. Deane & Sons, 1938.
- Under the chestnut tree. London, Country Life Ltd., 1938. Illustrated by Clifford Webb.
- Come to the fair: a comedy in one act. London: H. F. W. Deane & Sons, 1939.
- Round about the little steeple; the story of a downland village and its parson in the seventeenth century. London: G. Allen & Unwin, 1960.
- Staying with the aunts. London: Harvill Press, 1963.
- An idler on the Shropshire borders. Shrewsbury: Wilding, 1970.
- The heart of a village : an intimate history of Aldbourne. Bradford-on-Avon: Moonraker Press, 1975.
