= Frederick Shepherd =

Frederick Shepherd (1869–1969) was an English boat designer. He designed 84 yachts over his 45-year career, and usually supervised the construction of each yacht. This may account for the relatively small number of designs over a long career of designing yachts. Unusually amongst yacht designers of the time, his principal focus was cruising yachts rather than racing yachts. His focus on cruising rather than racing meant that he became known for yachts which had attractive lines and better space down below than their racing equivalents.

== Early career ==
Shepherd spent his early career as a draughtsman at Arthur E Payne and then yacht brokers Lory & Cornwallis.

== Established as an independent designer (1899–1914) ==
In 1899 Shepherd established his own design office in London, based at Norfolk Street, off the Strand. During his early years in this office he designed a notable selection of larger yachts including Nereus (1899, 95' long), Coral of Cowes (1902, 98' long), and Pelagia, later renamed Diogene (1903, 92' long). Having established his 'big boat' credentials he spent the years until the outbreak of the First World War in 1914 focused mainly on mid-sized cruising sailing yachts in the range 35' to 65' in length. These were interspersed with a more varied range of boats such as Coralind (1904, a 5-ton yawl), Baby II (a racing motor boat), Thalia (1911, a wildfowling and cruising cutter) and Corona (1911, a 50'6" long centreplate yawl which had a minimum draught of just 3'10")

== Hiatus during and following the war (1914–1929) ==
Having seen the launch of four of his designs in 1914, and with an inevitable slowdown during the war years, Shepherd relocated his practice in 1921 to Swanwick in Hampshire, and in 1926 he co-founded a yacht building business Frederick Shepherd and Morgan Limited, although this was short-lived and by 1929 he had returned to London, re-establishing a design practice in Piccadilly.

== Later career: return to designing yachts (1929–1939) ==
The first design he is known to have launched after this move was Crystal II (1929, a 35' yawl) and this was followed in quick succession by three larger boats: White Bird (1928, 100'4" long), Milena (1929, 89' long) and Lexia (1931, 64' long). Around this time Shepherd appointed Fred Parker as an assistant and together they settled into a pattern of designing mid-sized sailing yachts ranging from 35' to 51' in length and it is this type of yacht for which Shepherd remains best known. Very typical of his designs was the Selina King, a 35-foot-6-inch (10.82 m) Bermudian cutter built for Arthur Ransome in 1938. The yachts also include three built for military men: Maybird (1937, a 43' gaff ketch built for Lieutenant Colonel WCW Hawkes), Amokura (1939, a 50'6" Bermudian yawl built for Major (later Sir) Ernest Harston, ADC to Lord Mountbatten) and Glaramara (1947, a replica of Amokura's hull, rigged as a yawl, built for Naval officer Sir Philip Bowyer Smith). During this time Shepherd also acted as a marine surveyor.

== Retirement (1939–1969) ==
By the late 1930s Shepherd had relocated his office to Kings Somborne in Hampshire, close to his favoured boat building yards White Bros (Southampton), Berthon Boat Company (Lymington) and AH Moody & Sons (Swanwick) Shepherd came out of retirement in 1946 to design, and supervise the build, of Glaramara.
