= Cathy Burnham Martin =

American author, actress, and television news anchor

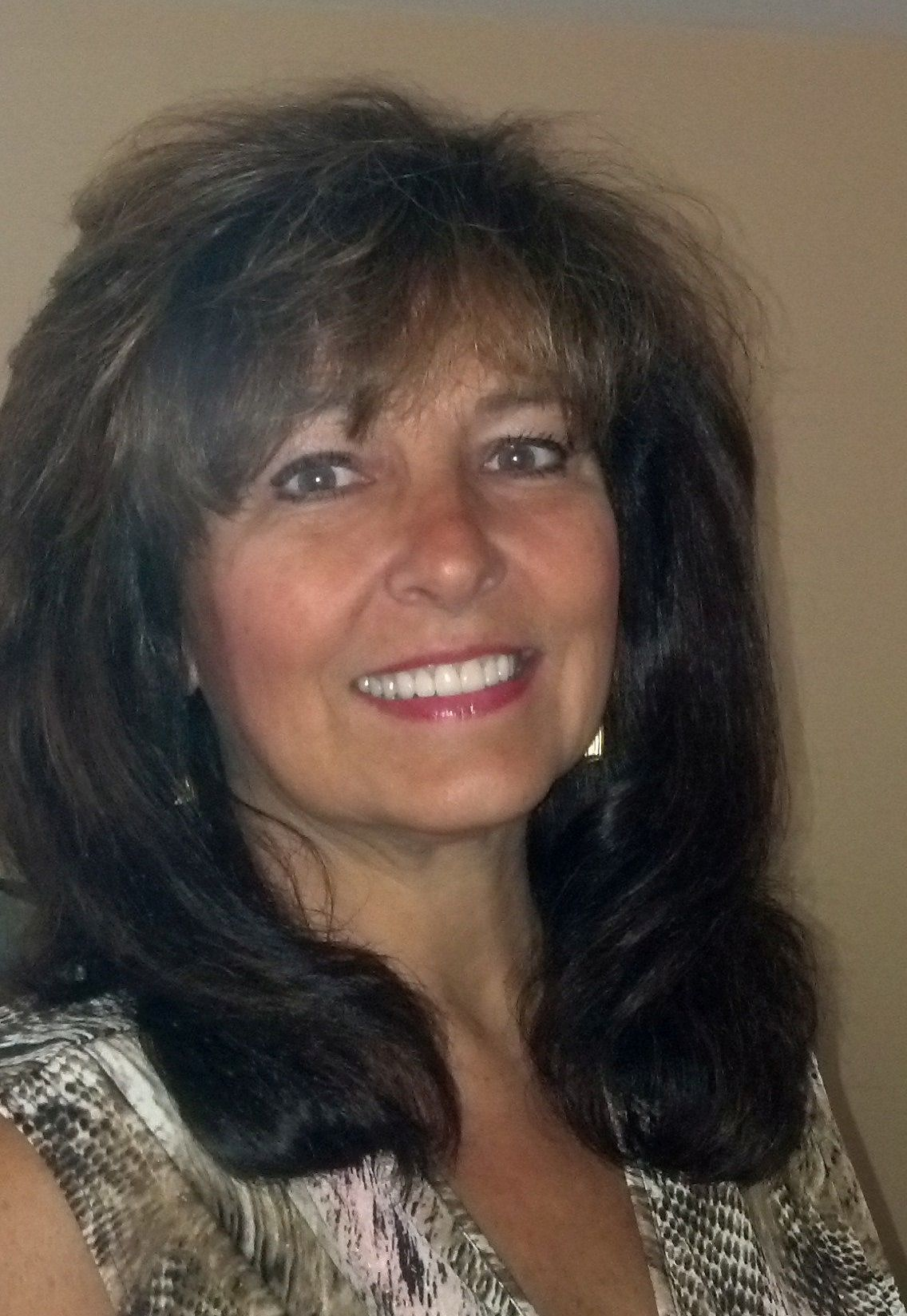
- Martin in 2014
- Born: Catherine Ann Burnham; May 10, 1954 (age 72); Goffstown, New Hampshire, USA
- Education: 2009 Masters in Corporate & Organizational Communications
- Alma mater: Northeastern University, Boston, Massachusetts
- Occupations: Author, voice-over artist, journalist, and motivational business speaker
- Spouse: Ronald Charles Martin
- Children: 4 Step-Children: Christopher, Keira, Nina, and Adam
- Relatives: Parents: Robert & Glenna Burnham; Siblings: Deborah Burnham & James Burnham
- Writing career
- Genres: Non-fiction, Fiction, and Cookbooks
- Subjects: Life Lessons, Biography, Humor, Historical Fiction, Cookbooks
- Notable works: The Destiny Series (2021 - 2023); Super Simple Recipe Series (2014 - ongoing); Life Seasonings Series (2025 - ongoing)
- Notable awards: 2009 Easter Seals David P. Goodwin Lifetime Commitment Award
- Website: goodliving123.com

Cathy Burnham Martin (born May 10, 1954) is an American author, voiceover artist, actress, and former television news anchor. She has authored more than twenty books, including the humorous human training manual "A Dangerous Book for Dogs" and "Of the Same Blood: Your Eurasian Heritage," which reflects on her grandmother's life drama and her Armenian-European-American heritage. Martin produces and narrates audiobooks for both fiction and nonfiction titles. She is noted for creating the KISS™ Keep It Super Simple cookbook series. A member of the Actors' Equity Association since 1994, she was a 20+ year professional member of the National Speakers Association since 1995, where she is referred to as "The Morale Booster."

== Early life ==
Born in Goffstown, New Hampshire, Catherine Ann Burnham is the middle child of Robert and Glenna Burnham. Before graduating from Goffstown High School in 1972, Cathy represented the Granite State in the America's Junior Miss Pageant in Mobile, Alabama as New Hampshire's Junior Miss.

She studied Speech and Theatre at Stetson University in DeLand, Florida, before transferring to Southern New Hampshire University (then New Hampshire College) in 1974. As a student, she made her professional acting debut in 1974 in a New Hampshire Repertory Theatre production of "The Miracle Worker" to re-open the historic Palace Theatre (Manchester, New Hampshire). Burnham says among her most important college experiences were serving a 1974 summer internship in Copenhagen, Denmark, and representing the state again as Miss New Hampshire 1975 in the Miss America Pageant in Atlantic City, New Jersey. She graduated in 1976 with a Bachelor of Science degree in marketing.

== Career ==
While still in college, Martin traveled as soloist and public relations director for the "I Like the U.S. of A." National Touring Company. She then served as a marketing rep, recruiting students for Boston's Burdett School. She continued recruiting at Southern New Hampshire University, where she also coached cheerleading, directed plays, and coordinated the tour guides.

In 1983 she hosted her first telethon for Easter Seals of New Hampshire, which led to her being hired by WMUR-TV (ABC) in Manchester, New Hampshire. As Special Projects Coordinator she produced and hosted a number of documentaries and television specials for the ABC affiliate, along with reporting and anchoring the nightly lifestyles and entertainment reports.

In 1987 she originated WMUR's "5:30 Live" on location news magazine program, before taking over the 6 and 11 o'clock anchor desk in 1988. By the time she left WMUR-TV in 1994, Martin had accumulated numerous NH Broadcasting Association awards for documentaries, specials, and news coverage as well as accolades as the State's favorite media personality. She also anchored at WABU-TV in Boston, Massachusetts, and managed the PEG community access station BCTV in Bedford, NH. Under her leadership, BCTV won its first awards from the Northeast Alliance for Community Media, capturing 6 awards for excellence, and topping other stations from New England, New York, and New Jersey.

A business speaker, Burnham's SpeakEasy 123™, involved corporate communications coaching and video production. The talent division also enabled her to resume her professional acting and voiceover endeavors.

In 1998, she was recognized as a contributing author of "The Communications Coach: Tips from the Pros," which featured her "Taming the Media Monster." By 2005 the book "A Healthier You" was published, featuring her "Healthy Thinking Habits" along with interviews from Billy Blanks and Deepak Chopra. Her first solo book was released in 2007. "Dog Days in the Life of the Miles-Mannered Man" was also released as an Audiobook in 2016. In 2017 Quiet Thunder Publishing released "The Bimbo Has Brains," Martin's life lessons book focused on stereotypes, double standards, and relationships. In 2022, she received the Silver Literary Titan Award for "Destiny of Determination: Faith and Family," book 2 in the Destiny historical fiction trilogy.

Along with voiceover work, Cathy Burnham Martin continues to write books, along with articles for the GoodLiving123.com blog, which she has written since May 2011.

== Published Books ==
- 2013 -- Dog Days in the Life of the Miles-Mannered Man: A collection of tall tales, wagging tails, and tantalizing treats (2013, Quiet Thunder Publishing; ISBN 978-0-9770711-3-5)
- 2014 -- Of the Same Blood: Your Eurasian Heritage (2014, Quiet Thunder Publishing; ISBN 978-1-939220-36-3)
- 2014 -- The Ronald: Daydreams, Wonderments & Other Ponderings (2014, Quiet Thunder Publishing; ISBN 978-1-939220-15-8)
- 2014 -- Dockside Dining: Round One (2014, Quiet Thunder Publishing; ISBN 978-1-939220-26-4)
- 2014 -- Dockside Dining: A Second Helping (2014, Quiet Thunder Publishing; ISBN 978-1-939220-28-8)
- 2014 -- Cranberry Cooking (2014, Quiet Thunder Publishing; ISBN 978-0-9832136-5-9)
- 2015 -- Champagne! Facts, Fizz, Food & Fun (2015, Quiet Thunder Publishing; ISBN 978-0-9832136-9-7)
- 2015 -- Fifty Years of Fabulous Family Favorites: Starters, Sippers & Sweets (2015, Quiet Thunder Publishing; ISBN 978-0-9770711-6-7)
- 2015 -- Fifty Years of Fabulous Family Favorites: Brunch, Lunch & Entrees (2015, Quiet Thunder Publishing; ISBN 978-1-939220-00-4)
- 2015 -- Fifty Years of Fabulous Family Favorites: Sides, Soup, Salad, Snacks, Etc (2015, Quiet Thunder Publishing; ISBN 978-1-939220-02-08)
- 2015 -- Healthy Thinking Habits: Seven Attitude Skills Simplified (2015, Quiet Thunder Publishing; ISBN 978-1-939220-06-06)
- 2016 – A Dangerous Book for Dogs: Train Your Human - The Bandit Method (2916, Quiet Thunder Publishing, Full color edition; ISBN 978-1-939220-13-4)
- 2017 -- Lobacious Lobster: Decadently Super Simple Recipes (2017, Quiet Thunder Publishing; ISBN 978-0-9832136-7-3)
- 2017 -- Silver Fox Farm: Horse Country Luxury Living (2017, Quiet Thunder Publishing; ISBN 978-1-939220-25-7)
- 2017 -- Dockside Dining: Back for Thirds (2917, Quiet Thunder Publishing, ISBN 978-1-939220-34-9)
- 2017 -- The Bimbo Has Brains: and Other Freaky Facts (2017, Quiet Thunder Publishing; ISBN 978-1-939220-39-4)
- 2018 -- The Bimbo Has MORE Brains: Surviving Political Correctness (2018, Quiet Thunder Publishing; ISBN 978-1-939220-43-1)
- 2019 -- Encouragement: How to Be and Find the Best (2019, Quiet Thunder Publishing; ISBN 978-1-939220-47-9)
- 2019 -- Kennedy Hill: A Home for All Seasons (2019, Quiet Thunder Publishing; ISBN 978-1-939220-50-9)
- 2020 -- Good Living Skills: Learned from my Mother (2020, Quiet Thunder Publishing; ISBN 978-1-939220-51-6)
- 2021 -- Destiny of Dreams: Time Is Dear (2021, Quiet Thunder Publishing; ISBN 978-1-939220-57-8)
- 2022 -- Destiny of Determination: Faith and Family (2022, Quiet Thunder Publishing; ISBN 978-1-939220-60-8)68-4}})
- 2025 -- Perspectives: and Other Life Seasonings (2025, Quiet Thunder Publishing; ISBN 978-0-9832136-4-2)
- 2025 -- Hope: and Other Life Seasonings (2025, Quiet Thunder Publishing; ISBN 978-1-939220-64-6)
- 2025 -- Happiness: and Other Life Seasonings (2025, Quiet Thunder Publishing; ISBN 978-1-939220-69-1)
- 2025 -- Forgiveness: and Other Life Seasonings (2025, Quiet Thunder Publishing; ISBN 978-1-939220-72-1)
- 2025 -- Humor: and Other Life Seasonings (2025, Quiet Thunder Publishing; ISBN 978-1-939220-75-2)
- 2025 -- Compassion: and Other Life Seasonings (2025, Quiet Thunder Publishing; ISBN 978-1-939220-78-3)
