= Louise Lamprey =

American writer of books for children

Louise Lamprey

Louise Lamprey (17 April 1869–14 January 1951) was the pen name of Lunnette Emeline Lamprey, an American writer of books for children.

She was born at her grandmother's house in Alexandria, New Hampshire, the daughter of the Revd. Henry Phelps Lamprey and his wife Ellen Selomy Lamprey (née Hardy). She had a younger sister, Elmira Adrienne Lamprey. Louise Lamprey lived in Parsonsfield, Maine until she was seven years old. She was privately educated at home and at Concord High School in New Hampshire. In 1891 she was awarded her bachelor's degree from Mount Holyoke College as a member of its first graduating class.

She was one of the first woman editors of a Washington, D.C. newspaper when she became an editorial writer for the weekly newspaper The Capital (1894–1898). For eight years she was an editorial writer and book reviewer for the daily newspaper The Washington Times (1896–1904), where she later claimed to have received most of her training, in addition to doing magazine, newspaper and secretarial work in New York. Lamprey wrote for the Republican National Campaign of 1904. Over five summers between 1912 and 1919 Lamprey worked as a lecturer, storyteller and craft teacher at various New England summer camps, including Laughing Loon Camp in East Waterboro in Maine, the Limerick Campfire Girls and The Bluebird in East Berkshire in Vermont. She also wrote and staged plays for the camps. As a result of these activities Lamprey was drawn to writing children’s books, specifically historical fiction.

She visited England and Scotland during 1912 to 1914 and while in London she undertook office work and writing before commencing her career as an author of books for children. She also contributed articles on architecture and primitive dwellings to Junior Encyclopedia Britannica. Of her book The Tomahawk Trail (1934), a reviewer for The New York Times wrote: “Miss Lamprey is known for the careful historical backgrounds in her stories, filled in with authentic detail. Sometimes, in fact, the story tends to become subservient to the setting. In The Tomahawk Trail however, both the events and the characters hold the reader's attention. Later in life she lived in Limerick, Maine. She was listed in Who's Who in America.

Louise Lamprey died at Limerick, Maine in 1951 and was buried with her parents in Blossom Hill Cemetery in Concord, New Hampshire. She never married.

A collection of correspondence between Lamprey and the Maine State Librarian Henry Ernest Dunnack is held by Maine State Library.

== Selected bibliography ==
- In the Days of the Guild (New York, Frederick A. Stokes Company, 1918)
- Masters of the Guild (Frederick A. Stokes Co, New York, 1920)
- Children of Ancient Britain (Boston, Little, Brown, and company, 1921)
- The Alo Man: Stories from the Congo (New York : World Book Co., 1921)
- Days of the Discoverers (New York : Frederick A Stokes company, 1921)
- Children of Ancient Rome (Boston : Little, Brown, and Co., 1922)
- Days of the Colonists (New York : Frederick A. Stokes, 1922)
- The Days of the Commanders (New York: Frederick A. Stokes, 1923)
- Children of Ancient Greece (Boston : Little, Brown, and Co., 1924)
- Days of the Pioneers (New York: Frederick A. Stokes, 1924)
- Days of the Leaders (New York: Frederick A. Stokes, 1925)
- Days of the Builders (New York: Frederick A. Stokes, 1926)
- Children of Ancient Gaul (Boston: Little, Brown, 1927), illust. by Margaret Freeman
- Wonder Tales of Architecture (New York: Frederick A. Stokes, 1927)
- Children of Ancient Egypt (Boston: Little, Brown, and Co., 1928)
- History of Limerick (Cornish, Maine, 1928)
- The Treasure Valley (Morrow, New York, 1928)
- All the Ways of Building (New York: The Macmillan Company, 1933)
- The Tomahawk Trail (New York: Frederick A. Stokes Company, 1934)
- The Limerick Pageant (Cornish, Maine, 1936)
- The Story of Weaving (New York: Frederick A. Stokes Company, 1939)
- The Story of Cooking (New York: Frederick A. Stokes Company, 1940)
