= The Arthur Ransome Society =

TARS logo

The Arthur Ransome Society, also known by its acronym Tars, and whose members refer to themselves as Tars, is a society whose goals are to "celebrate the life, promote the works and diffuse the ideas of Arthur Ransome". It is based at the Abbot Hall Art Gallery in Kendal, England. Arthur Ransome is best known for writing the Swallows and Amazons series of children's books in the 1930s and 1940s.

== History ==
In 1984, Christina Hardyment had written an account of her own investigations into the real-life places and real-life people in Arthur Ransome's stories. As a direct result of this book, Arthur Ransome and Captain Flint's Trunk, people interested in forming a society dedicated to Arthur Ransome had been leaving their contact details at Abbot Hall, where, following his death in 1967, his widow Evgenia had donated various articles, including his writing desk. In 1989, Christina followed up on these contact details by sending an appeal for funds to restore the dilapidated Mavis, the supposed prototype for Arthur Ransome's Amazon. The response to this appeal was overwhelming and in June 1990 The Arthur Ransome Society was formed.

A particularly large sum came from the Arthur Ransome Club (ARC) of Japan. The ceremony was attended by Christina Hardyment, Tamami Nakayama of ARC and Brigit Sanders (née Altounyan), a prototype of the character Bridget Walker. Brigit Sanders was President of TARS from 1990 until her death in 1999.

In 1997, the society was incorporated as a Company Limited by Guarantee.

== TARS now ==
TARS produces several regular publications, holds many recreational and scholarly events and maintains a Ransome-themed website. TARS has a wide international membership base which includes branches in Australia, Canada, US, Japan and New Zealand. In the UK there are 6 different regions: Scottish, Northern, Midland and Wales, Eastern, South Western and Southern, each with its own leadership committee. They also organize local events which are open to all members. Every year one region in the UK takes its turn to host the International Annual General Meeting (IAGM).

TARS has a subsidiary, Amazon Publications, which publishes both original books and reprints of books associated with Ransome. Not to be confused with Amazon Publishing, Amazon Publications publishes books relating to Arthur Ransome and his works, available to TARS members only.

The Arthur Ransome Society has a substantial physical library of books and other materials, most of which are available for borrowing by members.

There are strong links with the Arthur Ransome Club in Japan but no formal association.
