= Steven Spurrier (artist) =

British artist (1878–1961)

- Born: 13 July 1878; London, England
- Died: 11 March 1961 (aged 82); London, England
- Education: Heatherley's School of Fine Art; Gilbert Garrett School
- Known for: Painting

Steven Spurrier RA (13 July 1878 – 11 March 1961) was a British artist known for his paintings, book and magazine illustrations, and poster designs. He was a war artist in both World Wars.

== Biography ==
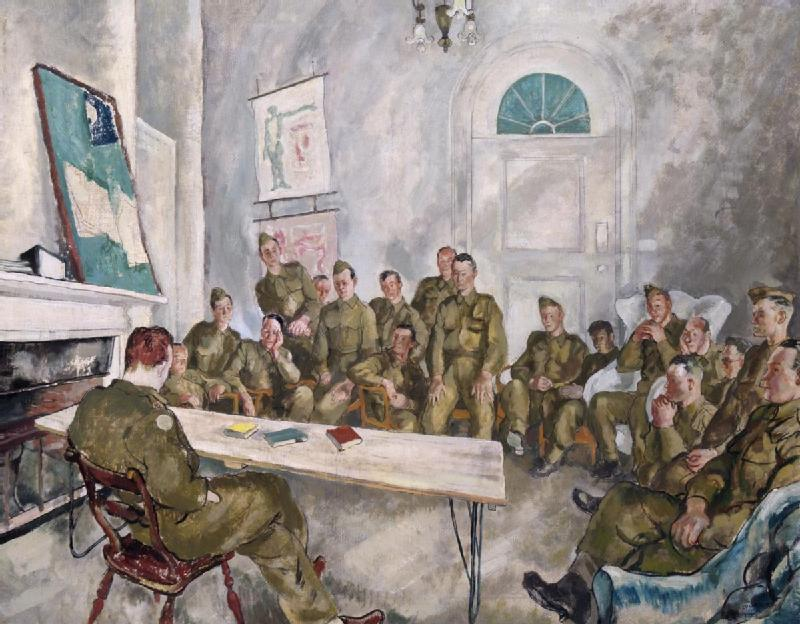
An Army discussion group (1943)

Spurrier was born in London and from the age of seventeen served an apprenticeship to his silversmith father. Spurrier also studied art at evening classes at Heatherley's School of Art and then at the Gilbert Garrett School. In 1900, Spurrier gave up silverwork and became a freelance magazine illustrator. His work appeared in magazines such as Madame, Black and White, The Graphic, The Illustrated London News, The Windsor Magazine and the Radio Times.

During the First World War, he worked with the Admiralty developing dazzle camouflage for ships. During World War Two, in March 1944, the War Artists' Advisory Committee offered Spurrier a commission of 50 guineas to paint a picture of an Army discussion group. Spurrier exhibited at the Royal Academy from 1913, was made an associate member in 1945 and became a full member of the Academy in 1952.

His work was part of the painting event in the art competition at the 1928 Summer Olympics.

Spurrier also produced posters for theatrical productions and illustrated books. His illustrations for Swallows and Amazons, the first book in the children's series by Arthur Ransome, were disliked by Ransome and were not used except for the dust jacket and map. Later editions had illustrations by Clifford Webb and then by Ransome himself.

Spurrier died in London in 1961. He had married Gertrude Stocks in 1904; their elder son, Christopher F. Spurrier (b. 1911) was an airline executive, including as manager of British West Indian Airways at Barbados; their younger son, John Benison Spurrier (born 1914; known as "John Benison") was a designer and artist.

== Publications ==
- Black and White (1909)
- Illustration in Wash and Line (1933)
