= Rod and Line =

Rod and Line is a noted book on fishing first published in 1929 (and re-issued many times since) by the famous author Arthur Ransome. It is a collection of fifty columns he contributed to the Manchester Guardian over the years 1924 to 1928. It is noted as being one of the most significant contributions to English fishing literature. Indeed Mortimer and Whitehouse (2019) regard it as providing “some of the best writing on fishing”. And Coopey (2010) argues the Ransome, in Rod and Line “produced one of the most evocative and rich texts in the English language”.

Granada television produced a series in 1982 starring Michael Hordern in which he read the text over films of his fishing.

There is a recording, perhaps the only one of Ransome’s voice, reading from Rod and Line that was broadcast in 1948 on the BBC Third Programme.

== Editions ==
- Ransome, Arthur. 1929. (also 1932, 1935, 1940, 1947) Rod and line: essays, together with Aksakov on fishing. London: J. Cape (includes some writing from S. T. Aksakov.)
- Ransome, Arthur, and S. T. Aksakov. 1967. Rod and line. London: Sphere Books.
- Ransome, Arthur. 1980. Rod and line. Oxford: Oxford University Press.
- Ransome, Arthur, and Michael Hordern. 1983. Rod and line. MFP.
- Ransome, Arthur, and Jeremy Swift. 1993 (also 1998). Rod and line. The Flyfisher's Classic Library, Devon
- Ransome, Arthur. 2006. Rod and line. Medlar Press Limited, Ellesmere, Shropshire
