= Arthur Ransome =

English author and journalist (1884–1967)

Arthur Ransome CBE
- Cover of Ransome's autobiography
- Born: Arthur Michell Ransome; 18 January 1884; Leeds, England
- Died: 3 June 1967 (aged 83); Cheadle Royal Hospital, Cheshire, England
- Resting place: St Paul's Church, Rusland, Cumbria, England
- Occupations: Author; journalist
- Writing career
- Genre: Children's literature
- Notable work: Swallows and Amazons series of books
- Notable awards: Carnegie Medal; 1936

Arthur Michell Ransome (18 January 1884 – 3 June 1967) was an English author, intelligence agent, and journalist. He is best known for writing and illustrating the Swallows and Amazons series of children's books about the school-holiday adventures of children, mostly in the Lake District and the Norfolk Broads. The entire series remains in print, and Swallows and Amazons is the basis for a tourist industry around Windermere and Coniston Water, the two lakes Ransome adapted as his fictional North Country lake.

He also wrote about the literary life of London, and about Russia before, during, and after the revolutions of 1917. His connection with the leaders of the Revolution led to him providing information to the Secret Intelligence Service, while he was also suspected by MI5 of being a Soviet spy.

== Early life ==
Ransome was the son of Cyril Ransome (1851–1897) and his wife Edith Ransome (née Baker Boulton) (1862–1944). Arthur was the eldest of four children: he had two sisters, Cecily and Joyce, and a brother Geoffrey who was killed in the First World War in 1918. Joyce married into the Lupton family, well-connected industrialists and politicians; one of her sons was Arthur Ralph Ransome Lupton (1924–2009) and one of her grandchildren is storyteller Hugh Lupton (born 1952).

Ransome was born in Leeds; the house at 6 Ash Grove, in the Hyde Park area, has a blue plaque beside the door commemorating his birthplace. Ransome's father was professor of history at Yorkshire College (now the University of Leeds). The family regularly holidayed at Nibthwaite in the Lake District, and he was carried up to the top of Coniston Old Man as an infant. His father's premature death in 1897 had a lasting effect on him. His mother did not want him to abandon his studies for writing, but was later supportive of his books. She urged him to publish The Picts and the Martyrs in 1943, although his second wife Evgenia hated it, and was often discouraging about his books while he was writing them.

Ransome was educated first in Windermere and then at Rugby School (where he lived in the same study room that had been used by Lewis Carroll) but did not entirely enjoy the experience, because of his poor eyesight, lack of athletic skill, and limited academic achievement. He studied chemistry at Yorkshire College, where his late father had worked.

== Writing career ==
After a year at Yorkshire College, he abandoned his studies and went to London to become a writer. He took low-paying jobs as an office assistant in a publishing company and as editor of a failing magazine, Temple Bar Magazine, while establishing himself as a member of the literary scene.

Some of Ransome's early works were The Nature Books for Children, a series of children's books commissioned by Anthony Treherne. Only three of the six planned volumes were published before the publisher went bankrupt. They are available on the All Things Ransome website.

In his first important book, Bohemia in London (1907), Ransome introduced the history of the city's Bohemian literary and artistic communities and some of its current representatives. A curiosity in 1903 about a visiting Japanese poet, Yone Noguchi, led to an ongoing friendship with Japanese painter (and Chelsea neighbour) Yoshio Markino, who in turn introduced him to the Bohemian circle of Pamela Colman Smith, an artist best known for illustrating the Rider–Waite tarot deck.

Ransome married Ivy Constance Walker in 1909 and they had one daughter, Tabitha. It was not a happy marriage; Ransome found his wife's demands to spend less time on writing and more with her and their daughter a great strain; his biographer Hugh Brogan writes that "it was impossible to be a good husband to Ivy". They divorced in 1924.

Ransome began writing books of biography and literary criticism on various authors; one on Edgar Allan Poe was published in 1910 and another on Oscar Wilde in 1912. However, the latter embroiled him in a libel suit with Lord Alfred Douglas. His wife attended the 1913 trial, sitting in the public gallery as Ransome would not let her sit beside him. Her apparent enjoyment of the public notoriety the case attracted added to the stress on their marriage. The publisher Daniel Macmillan dined with the couple every day during the trial so that Ivy could not quarrel with Arthur. Ransome won the suit, supported by Robbie Ross, the editor of De Profundis. Douglas was bankrupted by the failed libel suit. Ransome did, however, remove the offending passages from the second edition of his book and refused all interviews, despite the obvious publicity value.

Adding to Ransome's "wretched" 13 months waiting for the case to come to trial was the action of his publisher, Charles Granville. Oscar Wilde, a critical study had been prepared under the guidance of publisher Martin Secker, but Granville had promised better returns and a guaranteed and steady income. Secker agreed to release the rights, and Ransome handed Poe and Wilde over to Granville. The work on Wilde was well received and successful, running to eight editions, but Ransome saw little in return; in 1912 Granville was charged with embezzlement and fled the country, leaving Ransome to struggle even to register himself as a creditor of Granville's ruined company. Furthermore, his neglect of his health (he suffered from piles and a stomach ulcer) had been exacerbated by the pressure of defending the legal action. Ransome had also been working on a similar literary biography of Robert Louis Stevenson, but that was abandoned with the manuscript in the first draft and not rediscovered until 1999. It was subsequently edited and finally published almost a century later in 2011 as Arthur Ransome's Long-lost Study of Robert Louis Stevenson.

As an enthusiast for detective fiction, between 1939 and 1940 Ransome contributed to The Observer as a reviewer of new detective novels, using the pen-name of William Blunt.

== Foreign correspondent ==
In 1913 Ransome left his first wife and daughter and went to Russia to study its folklore. In 1915, Ransome published The Elixir of Life (published by Methuen, London), which was to be his only full-length novel apart from the Swallows and Amazons series. It is a gothic romance concerning a youth who chances upon an alchemist who has discovered the titular elixir of life, whose powers must be renewed by the spilling of human blood. He published Old Peter's Russian Tales, a collection of 21 folktales from Russia, the following year.

After the start of the First World War, in 1914, he became a foreign correspondent and covered the war on the Eastern Front for a radical newspaper, The Daily News. He also covered the Russian Revolutions of 1917 and came to sympathise with the Bolshevik cause, becoming personally close to a number of its leaders, including Vladimir Lenin, Leon Trotsky and Karl Radek. He met the woman who would become his second wife, Evgenia Petrovna Shelepina, who then worked as Trotsky's personal secretary.

Ransome provided some information to British officials and the British Secret Intelligence Service, which gave him the code name S.76 in their files. Bruce Lockhart said in his memoirs: "Ransome was a Don Quixote with a walrus moustache, a sentimentalist who could always be relied upon to champion the underdog, and a visionary whose imagination had been fired by the revolution. He was on excellent terms with the Bolsheviks and frequently brought us information of the greatest value." Nonetheless, in March 1919, on one of his return visits to the United Kingdom, the authorities interviewed him and threatened him with exposure as an agent. In October 1919, Ransome met Reginald Leeper of the Foreign Office's Political Intelligence Department, who required Ransome privately to submit his articles and public speaking engagements for approval. Ransome's response was "indignant". Unbeknown to Leeper, Ransome's "near treason[ous]" articles were written to buttress his exceptional access to the Bolshevik leadership. MI5, the British Security Service, was suspicious that Ransome and his fellow journalist, M. Philips Price, were a threat because of their opposition to the Allied Intervention in the Russian Civil War.

In October 1919, as Ransome was returning to Moscow on behalf of The Manchester Guardian, the Estonian foreign minister Ants Piip entrusted him to deliver a secret armistice proposal to the Bolsheviks. At that time, the Estonian War of Independence was being fought by Estonian pro-independence forces, alongside the White movement of counter-revolutionary forces. After crossing the battle lines on foot, Ransome passed the message, which, to preserve secrecy, had not been written down and depended for its authority only on the high personal regard in which he was held in both countries, to diplomat Maxim Litvinov in Moscow. To deliver the reply, which accepted Piip's conditions for peace, Ransome had to return by the same risky means, but now, he had Evgenia with him. Estonia withdrew from the conflict, and Ransome and Evgenia set up home together in the capital Tallinn.

After the Allied intervention, Ransome remained in the Baltic states and built a cruising yacht, Racundra. He wrote a successful book about his experiences, Racundra's First Cruise. He joined the staff of The Manchester Guardian when he returned to Russia and the Baltic states. Following his divorce, he married Evgenia and brought her to live in England, where he continued writing for The Guardian, often on foreign affairs, and also writing the "Country Diary" column on fishing. On the Ransomes' return to England, Racundra was sold to the yachting author Kaines Adlard Coles, who sailed her back to England.

== Swallows and Amazons series ==
By the late 1920s, Ransome had settled in the Lake District because he had decided not to accept a position as a full-time foreign correspondent with The Guardian newspaper. Instead he wrote Swallows and Amazons in 1929 – the first of the series that made his reputation as one of the best English writers of children's books. In 1948, Ransome and his wife, Evgenia, purchased Lowick Hall, a historic manor house near Ulverston, where he lived and worked for several years.

Ransome apparently based the Walker children (the "Swallows") in the book partly on the Altounyan family. He had a long-standing friendship with the mother of the Altounyans, and their Collingwood grandparents. Later, he denied the connection, claiming he simply gave the Altounyans' names to his own characters; it appears to have upset him that people did not regard the characters as original creations. Letters also indicate that conflict arose between Ransome and the family.

Ransome's writing is noted for his detailed descriptions of activities. Although he used many actual features from the Lake District landscape, he invented his own geography, mixing descriptions of different places to create his own juxtapositions. His move to near Pin Mill in East Anglia enabled him to enjoy sailing on the sea and brought a change of location for four of the books. Ransome started using the real landscape and geography of East Anglia, so that one can use the maps printed in the books as a guide to the real area. Ransome's own interest in sailing and his need to provide an accurate description caused him to undertake a voyage across the North Sea to Flushing in the Netherlands. His book We Didn't Mean To Go To Sea reflects that, and he based the fictional Goblin on his own boat Nancy Blackett (which in turn took its name from a character in the series).

Two or three of the Swallows and Amazons books have less realistic plots. The original concept of Peter Duck was a story made up by the children themselves, and Peter Duck had appeared in the preceding volume, Swallowdale, as a character whom the children created, but Ransome dropped the foreword of explanation from Peter Duck before it was published. Although relatively straightforward, the story, together with its equally unrealistic ostensible sequel Missee Lee, is much more fantastic than the rest of the series. A trip to China as a foreign correspondent provided Ransome with the imaginative springboard for Missee Lee, in which readers find the Swallows and the Amazons sailing around the world in the schooner Wild Cat from Peter Duck. Together with Captain Flint (the Amazons' uncle Jim Turner), they become the captives of Chinese pirates.

Peter Duck was illustrated by Ransome himself using pen and ink, although the frontispiece claims that the book is "Based on information supplied by the Swallows and Amazons and illustrated mainly by Themselves." Ransome then continued to illustrate the stories, and provided illustrations for new editions of the first two books of the series as of 1938, replacing images by Clifford Webb (whose illustrations for Swallows and Amazons had themselves replaced Steven Spurrier's first edition drawings. Ransome had disliked Spurrier's images and only the maps drawn by Spurrier were retained for the end paper and dust jacket).

The final book of the series, Great Northern? (1947), was set in Scotland, and while the plot and action appear realistic, the internal chronology does not fit the usual run of school holiday adventures. Myles North, an admirer of Ransome, provided much of the basic plot of the book.

Swallows and Amazons was so popular that it inspired a number of other authors to write in a similar vein. Most notably, two schoolchildren, Pamela Whitlock and Katharine Hull, wrote The Far-Distant Oxus, an adventure story set on Exmoor. Whitlock sent the manuscript to Ransome in March 1937, and he persuaded his publisher, Jonathan Cape, to produce it, characterising it as "the best children's book of 1937".

== Sailing ==
After the sale of Racundra in 1925 (in Coles' ownership she became Annette II), Ransome went on (in addition to the occasional charter, loan or trial sail) to own five further cruising yachts. His next yacht was the Hillyard-built Nancy Blackett, which he owned from 1935 to 1938. She was originally named Spindrift when launched in 1931.

After this came Selina King, a 35 ft 12 ton cutter with a canoe stern, designed by Frederick Shepherd and built at Harry Kings Yard in Pin Mill in 1938. She was laid up during the war and (on medical advice) they sold her in 1946.

After the war, he commissioned a ketch from Laurent Giles, again built in Pin Mill by Harry King: Peter Duck. He owned her from 1947 to 1949; her design was the basis for a class of which over 40 were built.

In July, 1951, he saw Norvad, a Hillyard five-and-a-half ton centre-cockpit yacht. With Evgenia, he had a trial sail in Norvad the following month in a hard offshore wind. They decided to get one, which he had decided should bear the name Lottie Blossom, and put in an order for that year's Boat Show model. With a list of things they wanted done to modify the boat below decks from the standard production model, the boat was launched on 1 April 1952. Ransome's health problems delayed their first sail to 15 April.

In December 1952, he sold Lottie Blossom to Sir William Paul Mallinson on condition that he (Ransome) retained the name.

Lottie Blossom II followed early the next year, using the same design of hull, but with aft cockpit and tiller steering. They had two very happy seasons in her, sailing her comfortably on their own, including two voyages to Cherbourg. The second voyage, in 1954, at the age of 70, was to be Ransome's last long passage.

== Personal life ==
Ransome married twice, first to Ivy Constance Walker in 1909, with whom he had a daughter, Tabitha Ransome; the couple divorced in 1924. His second marriage, that same year, was to Evgenia Petrovna Shelepina. Although MI5 appeared satisfied with Ransome's loyalty to Britain by 1937, KGB files that were opened following the end of the Soviet Union suggest that Evgenia Ransome, at least, was involved in smuggling diamonds from the USSR to Paris to help fund the Comintern. This is examined in the 2009 book The Last Englishman: the Double Life of Arthur Ransome by Roland Chambers. Ransome and his second wife are buried in the same grave.

== Death ==
Ransome died in Cheadle Royal Hospital on 3 June 1967. He and his wife Evgenia are buried in the churchyard of St Paul's Church, Rusland, Cumbria, in the southern Lake District. The Autobiography of Arthur Ransome, edited by Rupert Hart-Davis, was published posthumously in 1976. It covers his life only to the completion of Peter Duck in 1931.

== Awards and accolades ==
Ransome won the inaugural Carnegie Medal from the Library Association, recognising Pigeon Post in the Swallows and Amazons series as the year's best children's book by a British subject. He was appointed CBE in 1953. Durham University made him an honorary Master of Arts (which he told Cape to ignore) and Leeds University made him an honorary Doctor of Letters in 1952.

Translations of his books have been published in several languages and he became popular in many countries. Thriving Ransome appreciation societies exist in the Czech Republic, and in Japan where the Arthur Ransome Club was founded in 1987. Czech astronomer Antonín Mrkos named an asteroid after the author (6440 Ransome). The Arthur Ransome Society founded in 1990 in the U.K. now has a worldwide membership. The Arthur Ransome Trust was launched in 2010 with the object of establishing a permanent Arthur Ransome Home for the study and appreciation Arthur Ransome's life and works.

== Works ==
- The Souls of the Streets and other Little Papers (1904)
- The Child's Book of the Seasons (1906)
- Pond and Stream (1906)
- The Things in our Garden (1906)
- Bohemia in London (1907)
- The Book of Friendship (1909)
- A History of Story-telling (1909)
- Edgar Allan Poe (1910)
- The Book of Love (1911)
- The Hoofmarks of the Faun (1911)
- Oscar Wilde, a Critical Study (1912)
- Portraits and Speculations (1913)
- The Elixir of Life (1915)
- Old Peter's Russian Tales (1916)
- A Letter to America (1918)
- Six Weeks in Russia (1919)
- Aladdin and his Wonderful Lamp in rhyme (1920)
- The Crisis in Russia (1921)
- The Soldier and Death (1922)
- Racundra's First Cruise (1923)
- The Chinese Puzzle (1927)
- Rod and Line (1929)
- Mainly about Fishing (1959)

=== "Swallows and Amazons" series ===
- Swallows and Amazons (published 1930)
- Swallowdale (1931)
- Peter Duck (1932)
- Winter Holiday (1933)
- Coot Club (1934)
- Pigeon Post (1936)
- We Didn't Mean To Go To Sea (1937)
- Secret Water (1939)
- The Big Six (1940)
- Missee Lee (1941)
- The Picts and the Martyrs: Or Not Welcome at All (1943)
- Great Northern? (1947)
- Coots in the North (unfinished) —Ransome died in 1967 and the work was edited by Hugh Brogan and sections published as unfinished in 1988, with some other short works.

=== Published posthumously ===
- Racundra's third cruise (1972) (edited by Brian Hammett)
- The Autobiography of Arthur Ransome (1976) (edited by Rupert Hart-Davis)
- The War of the Birds and Beasts and other Russian tales (1984) (edited by Hugh Brogan)
- Arthur Ransome On Fishing (1994) (edited by Jeremy Swift)
- Arthur Ransome's Long-lost Study of Robert Louis Stevenson (2011) (edited by Kirsty Nichol Findlay)
