= Miss New Hampshire =

Beauty pageant competition

- Formation: 1925
- Type: Scholarship Program
- Headquarters: Derry
- Location: New Hampshire
- Members: Miss America
- Official language: English
- Website: Official website

The Miss New Hampshire is the scholarship program that selects the representative for the state of New Hampshire in the Miss America competition.

The Miss New Hampshire program was conducted by the Union Leader newspaper for more than 50 years. In the early years of Miss America, it was city newspapers that sponsored the young women to go to Atlantic City as the Miss America Organization originally allowed city titleholders to compete. The Union Leader conducted the pageant from 1947 until 2001. The newspaper held the pageant from at least 1985 to 2001 at the Manchester Central High School auditorium.

In 2000, a non-profit corporation formed and was granted the license by the Miss America Organization to conduct the state program from 2002 through today. Originally run by former Miss Greater Derry local chapter leaders, the Miss New Hampshire Scholarship Program, Inc. is now a 501(c)(4) civic organization while the Miss New Hampshire Scholarship Foundation, which grants the scholarships, is a 501(c)(3) public charity. Brenda Keith of Derry served as board president and executive director until she joined the Board of Directors of the Miss America Organization in September 2018 for a two-year term. William Haggerty served as president until her return on January 1, 2021. Lynne Ulaky and Claudette Jolin serve as the Co-Executive Directors. The competition was moved to Derry in 2003 and is held annually at Pinkerton Academy's Stockbridge Theatre.

The Miss New Hampshire scholarship program grants more scholarships than most other states in the Miss America Program. In 2021, the Miss New Hampshire Scholarship Foundation granted $100,000 in scholarships to the 26 contestants who competed after winning their local titles. Prior to the State competition, the NH local programs grant another $80,00-$85,000 a year at the local level. The local programs are all non-profit corporations with group 501(c)(3) tax exempt status.

Lauren Plank of Marlborough was crowned Miss New Hampshire on May 2, 2026, at the Stockbridge Theatre at Pinkerton Academy in Derry. She competed for the title of Miss America 2027 on September 6, 2026, at the Kravis Center for the Performing Arts in West Palm Beach, Florida.

== Gallery of past titleholders ==
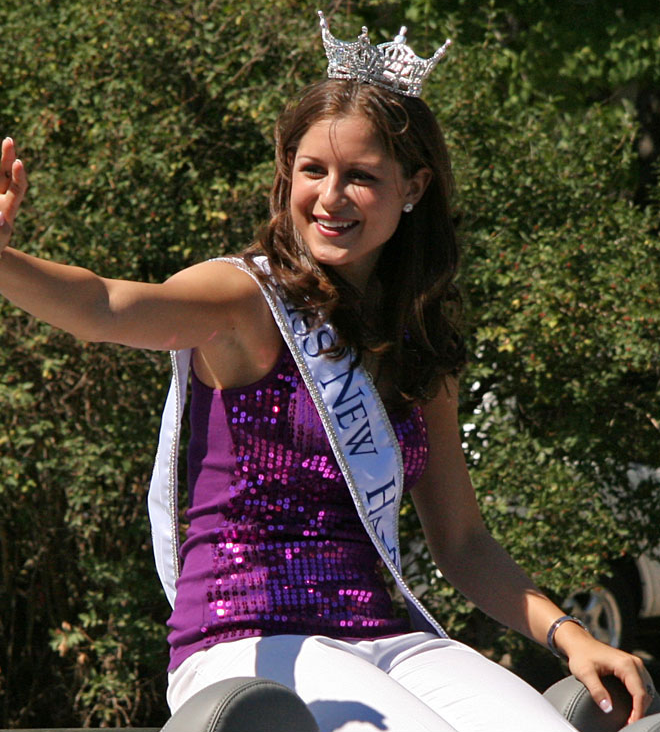
Rachel Barker,
Miss New Hampshire 2007

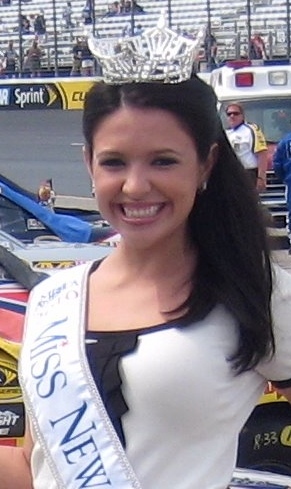
Krystal Muccioli,
Miss New Hampshire 2010

== Results summary ==
The following is a visual summary of the past results of Miss New Hampshire titleholders at the national Miss America pageants/competitions. The year in parentheses indicates the year of the national competition during which a placement and/or award was garnered, not the year attached to the contestant's state title.

=== Placements ===
- 4th runners-up: Nancy Anne Naylor (1967)
- Top 10: Candace Glickman (2004)
- Top 15: Edna Jones (1936), Coleen Gallant (1952)

=== Awards ===
==== Preliminary awards ====
- Preliminary Lifestyle and Fitness: Nancy Anne Naylor (1967), Candace Glickman (2004)
- Preliminary Talent: Tricia Ann-Regan McEachern (1994), Samantha Russo (2014)

==== Non-finalist awards ====
- Non-finalist Interview: Alyssa Spellman (2005)
- Non-finalist Talent: Mary Morin (1959), Michelle Cote (1974), Natalie Oliver (1982), Tricia Ann-Regan McEachern (1994), Samantha Russo (2014), Caroline Carter (2017)

==== Other awards ====
- Miss Congeniality: Margaret Wass (1963), Sheila Scott (1968) (tie)
- Bernie Wayne Scholarship: Tricia Ann-Regan McEachern (1994)
- Dr. David B. Allman Medical Scholarship: Cynthia Erb (1975)
- Dr. Marcia L. Leek Scholarship: Lauren Percy (2018)
- Neat as a Pin Award: Kristi Carlson (1972) (tie)
- Pyramid Scholarship for Public Relations & Marketing: Rachel Barker (2008)
- Quality of Life Award Winners: Brandee Helbick (2000)
- Quality of Life Award 1st runners-up: Lindsey Graham (2010), Regan Hartley (2012)
- STEM Scholarship Award Finalists: Marisa Moorhouse (2019)
- AHA Go Red for Women Leadership Award Regional Winner: Emily Spencer (2025), Xanthi Russell (2026)
- AHA Go Red for Women Leadership Award Winner: Lauren Plank (2027)

== Winners ==
- Declared as winner
- Ended as a runner-up
- Ended as a finalist or semi-finalist

Year	Name	Hometown	Age	Local Title	Miss America Talent	Placement at Miss America	Special scholarships at Miss America	Notes
2026	Lauren Plank	Marlborough, MA	21	Miss Bedford	Dance		AHA Go Red for Women Leadership Award Winner	Eligible as a student at the University of New Hampshire
2025	Xanthi Russell	Durham	23	Miss Lilac State	Tap Dance		AHA Go Red for Women Leadership Award Regional Winner	
2024	Emily Spencer	Bedford	23	Miss Winnipesaukee	Dance, "One Moment in Time"		AHA Go Red for Women Leadership Award Regional Winner	
2023	Brooke Mills	Concord	23	Miss Bedford	Vocal, "Come Rain or Come Shine"			Daughter of Miss New Hampshire 1995, Stephanie Foisy Mills Sister of Miss New Hampshire Teen USA 2021, Emilee Mills
2022	Sarah White	Hooksett	23	Miss Winnipesaukee	Tap Dance			
2021	Ashley Marsh	Laconia	26	Miss Winnipesaukee	Tap Dance			
2019–20 (Note: Titleholder extended to a full year in 2020 after state and national pageants postponed to 2021 due to the COVID-19 pandemic.)	Sarah Tubbs	Sandown	25	Miss Stratham	Lyrical Dance			
2018	Marisa Moorhouse	Manchester	18	Miss Manchester	Jazz Dance, "Respect"		STEM Scholarship Finalist	
2017	Lauren Percy	Bow	23	Miss Auburn	Broadway Jazz Dance, "Another Day in the Sun" from La La Land		Dr. Marcia L. Leek Scholarship	Previously Miss New Hampshire's Outstanding Teen 2011
2016	Caroline Carter	Dover	18	Miss Winnipesaukee	Vocal, "I Dreamed a Dream" from Les Misérables		Non-finalist Talent Award	Sister of Miss Vermont USA 2011, Lauren Carter Previously Miss New Hampshire's Outstanding Teen 2014
2015	Holly Blanchard	Derry	23	Miss Rockingham County	Baton Twirling, "Fireball"			Contestant at National Sweetheart 2014 pageant
2014	Megan Cooley	Auburn	19	Miss Greater Derry	Vocal, “On My Way" from Violet			
2013	Samantha Russo	Nashua	22	Miss Souhegan Valley	Vocal, "Don't Rain on My Parade"		Preliminary Talent Award Non-finalist Talent Award	
2012	Megan Lyman	Gilford	21	Miss Lakes Region	Tap Dance, "Edge of Glory"			Previously Miss New Hampshire's Outstanding Teen 2008 Contestant at National Sweetheart 2010 pageant
2011	Regan Hartley	Dover	20	Miss Keene Area	Vocal, "Let Him Fly"		Quality of Life Award 1st runner-up	1st runner-up at Miss Massachusetts USA 2013 pageant
2010	Krystal Muccioli	Nashua	20	Miss Greater Derry	Vocal, "On the Sunny Side of the Street"			
2009	Lindsey Graham	Sandown	22	Miss Seacoast Region	Vocal / Piano, "Hallelujah"		Quality of Life Award 1st runner-up	
2008	Natalie Shaw	Manchester	23	Miss Hooksett	Vocal, "If I Loved You"			Contestant at National Sweetheart 2007 pageant
2007	Rachel Barker	Amherst	20	Miss Seacoast	Ballet en Pointe, "Someone Like You" from Jekyll & Hyde		Pyramid Scholarship for Public Relations & Marketing	
2006	Emily Hughes	Gilmanton	23	Miss Winnipesaukee	Tap Dance, "Dancing in the Light"			Contestant at National Sweetheart 2003 pageant
2005	Audra Paquette	Merrimack	24	Miss Lakes Region	Lyrical Ballet, "Deliverance"			Contestant at National Sweetheart 1999 pageant Previously Miss New Hampshire USA 2002
2004	Alyssa Spellman	Derry	21	Miss Hooksett	Vocal, "If I Had My Way"		Non-finalist Interview Award	Contestant at National Sweetheart 2001 pageant
2003	Candace Glickman	Manchester	21	Miss Deerfield Fair	Vocal, "Half a Moment" from By Jeeves	Top 10	Preliminary Swimsuit Award	Later Miss New Hampshire USA 2005
2002	Mary Catherine Morin	Bedford	24	Miss Greater Derry	Classical Piano, Rapsodie espagnole			
2001	Katherine Lise Pike	Hooksett	24	Miss Winnipesaukee	Vocal, "You Are My Home" from The Scarlet Pimpernel			
2000	Lauren Meehan	Nashua	19	Miss Lakes Region	Vocal, "It's Time"			
1999	Brandee Helbick	Atkinson	24	Miss Goffstown	Jazz Dance, "Proud Mary"		Quality of Life Award	Contestant at National Sweetheart 1998 pageant
1998	Heidi Marie Noyes	Laconia	24	Miss Winnipesaukee	Tap Dance, "Fascinating Rhythm"			Contestant at National Sweetheart 1997 pageant
1997	Michelle Lamontagne	Goffstown	22	Miss Merrimack	Vocal, "Route 66"			
1996	Michelle Tolson	Manchester	22	Miss Winnipesaukee	Jazz Dance, "Hit Me With a Hot Note" from Sophisticated Ladies			
1995	Stephanie Foisy	Concord	18	Miss Merrimack	Tap Dance, "You Do Something to Me"			Later Mrs. New Hampshire America 2004 under married name, Stephanie Mills Mother of Miss New Hampshire Teen USA 2021 Emilee Mills Mother of Miss New Hampshire 2023 Brooke Mills
1994	Shannon Hastings	Newport	21	Miss Kingston	Vocal, "As If We Never Said Goodbye" from Sunset Boulevard			
1993	Tricia Ann-Regan McEachern	Hampton	20	Miss Deerfield Fair	Classical Vocal, "Torna a Surriento"		Bernie Wayne Scholarship Non-finalist Talent Award Preliminary Talent Award	
1992	Rachel Alice Petz	Sanbornton	23	Miss Plymouth State Fair	Semi-classical Vocal, "Love Is Where You Find It"			
1991	Deborah Jean Howard	Concord	24	Miss Derry	Vocal, "The Glory of Love"			
1990	Melanie Denise Bridges	Derry	23	Miss Derry	Vocal, "Let's Hear It For Me" from Funny Lady			
1989	Jennifer Ann Landry	Manchester	22	Miss Newmarket	Classical Ballet			
1988	Laura Lourette	Sandown	26	Miss Derry	Irish Festival Dance			
1987	Kristen Gamans	Manchester	23	Miss New Hampshire College	Gymnastics Character Dance			
1986	Lisa Vandecasteele	Salem	22	Miss Manchester	Dance / Baton Twirling			
1985	Tami Jean Brisebois	Deerfield	24	Miss Deerfield Fair	Modern Dance			
1984	Corinne Lucier	Hooksett	20	Miss New Hampshire College	Vocal, "The Simple Joys of Maidenhood" from Camelot			
1983	Monica Rastallis	Newport	22	Miss Winnipesaukee	Ballet, Theme from Summer of '42			
1982	Amy Bowker	Amherst	21	Miss Londonderry	Jazz Dance, "The Music and the Mirror" from A Chorus Line			
1981	Natalie Oliver	Manchester	21	Miss Heart of New Hampshire	Vocal, "Home" from The Wiz		Non-finalist Talent Award	
1980	Diane McGarry	Manchester	19	Miss Winnipesaukee	Magic / Modern Dance, "Come To Me"			
1979	Monica Skiathitis	Manchester	20	Miss New Hampshire College	Tap Dance, "Sweet Georgia Brown"			Previously New Hampshire's Junior Miss 1976
1978	Belinda Bridgeman	Merrimack	20	Miss Merrimack	Jazz Dance, Rhapsody in Blue			Previously Miss New Hampshire USA 1977 Mother of Miss New Hampshire Teen USA 2004, Brittany Freeman
1977	Jamie Rotwitt	Weirs Beach	20	Miss Plymouth State College	Organ Medley, "Bim Bam Boom" & "Oye Negra"			
1976	Margaret Spellacy	Hampton	21	Miss Winnipesaukee	Comedy Dance, "The Yankee Doodle Boy"			
1975	Catherine Burnham	Goffstown	21	Miss Manchester	Comedic Vocal, "Queen Lucy" from You're a Good Man, Charlie Brown			Previously New Hampshire's Junior Miss 1972
1974	Cynthia Erb	Manchester	18	Miss Manchester	Gymnastic Dance, Theme from Midnight Cowboy		Dr. David B. Allman Medical Scholarship	
1973	Michelle Cote	Manchester	22	Miss Manchester	Classical Vocal, "Steal Me, Sweet Thief" from The Old Maid and the Thief		Non-finalist Talent Award	
1972	Jane Badler	Manchester	18	Miss Manchester	Popular Vocal, "Can't Take My Eyes Off You"			Starred on NBC's V series from 1983 to 1985 and on ABC's V series in 2011
1971	Kristi Carlson	Nashua	19	Miss Keene	Vocal, "What About Today?"		Neat as a Pin Award (tie)	
1970	Deborah Ann Merrill	Portsmouth	19	Miss Plymouth State College	Vocal / Dance, "I Want to Be Happy" & "Happiness Is"			
1969	Catherine Zanichkowsky	Nashua	19	Miss Nashua	Vocal Medley, "Go Tell It on the Mountain" & "Blowin' in the Wind"			
1968	Michelle Godfrey	Portsmouth	18	Miss Portsmouth	Modern Interpretive Dance, "Tabu"			
1967	Sheila Scott	North Hampton	19	Miss North Hampton	Vocal, "We Need a Little Christmas"		Miss Congeniality (tie)	Assumed the Miss New Hampshire title after the original winner, Deborah Fuller, relinquished her title five days after she won in order to get married
1966	Nancy Anne Naylor	Portsmouth	19	Miss Portsmouth	Vocal, "I Enjoy Being a Girl"	4th runner-up	Preliminary Swimsuit Award	
1965	Cheryl-Leigh Buffum	Manchester	21	Miss Keene State College	Musical Comedy Sketch, "I Ain't Down Yet" from The Unsinkable Molly Brown			
1964	Elizabeth Emerson	Somersworth	22	Miss University of New Hampshire	Comedy Reading			
1963	Georgia Taggart	Westport, Connecticut		Miss Laconia	Dramatic Reading			Eligible as a student at New England College
1962	Margaret Wass	Barrington, Rhode Island	19	Miss Keene	Comedy Routine		Miss Congeniality	Eligible as a student at Keene Teachers College
1961	Annette Lambert	Claremont	18		Saxophone, "Valse Vanite" by Rudy Wiedoeft			
1960	Drina Bouchard	Rochester	18	Miss Rochester	Cha-cha-cha Interpretation			
1959	Diane Harris	Manchester	18		Interpretive Dance			
1958	Mary Morin	Manchester			Pantomime Routine		Non-finalist Talent Award	
1957	Holly Arnel	New London			Drama			
1956	Margaret Doyon	Littleton			Percussion			
1955	Margaret Johnson	Dover			Dramatic Monologue			
1954	Mae Allen	Epping			Drama			
1953	Elaine Ruggles	New Castle			Vocal			
1952	Barbara Temperly	Goffstown						
1951	Coleen Gallant	Laconia			Water Skiing	Top 15		
1950	Betty Laurie	Concord						
1949	Flora Sleeper	Laconia						
1948	Betty Taylor	Rochester			Dramatic Monologue			
1947	Bernice Loiselle	Manchester			Rumba Dance			
1946	No New Hampshire representative at Miss America pageant							
1945	Lee Corey	Spofford						
1944	Jackie Edson	Plaistow						
1943	No New Hampshire representative at Miss America pageant							
1942	No New Hampshire representative at Miss America pageant							
1941	No New Hampshire representative at Miss America pageant							
1940	No New Hampshire representative at Miss America pageant							
1939	Lois Marjorie Truax	Nashua						
1938	No New Hampshire representative at Miss America pageant							
1937	No New Hampshire representative at Miss America pageant							
1936	Edna Jones	Roxbury				Top 15		
1935	No New Hampshire representative at Miss America pageant							
1934	No national pageant was held							
1933	Letha Erlene Langley	Caribou, Maine	19					Letha was chosen as Miss Eastern Maine in 1933, and for unknown reasons, she was appointed the Miss New Hampshire title to compete in the 1933 Miss America pageant in Atlantic City, N.J. where she was a non-finalist contestant. This information was finally discovered in October 2023 contained in two newspaper articles from the Bangor Daily News. Letha Erlene Langley Karwowski died at age 88 on Dec. 17, 2002 in Chapin, South Carolina.
1932	No national pageants were held							
1931	No national pageants were held							
1930	No national pageants were held							
1929	No national pageants were held							
1928	No national pageants were held							
1927	No New Hampshire representative at Miss America pageant							
1926	No New Hampshire representative at Miss America pageant							
1925	Helen Kanehl	Manchester		Miss Manchester				
1924	No New Hampshire representative at Miss America pageant							
1923	No New Hampshire representative at Miss America pageant							
1922	No New Hampshire representative at Miss America pageant							
1921	No New Hampshire representative at Miss America pageant							
