= Swallowdale =

1931 children's book by Arthur Ransome

- Typical cover art depicting a collage of Arthur Ransome's own illustrations from the book
- Author: Arthur Ransome
- Cover artist: Arthur Ransome
- Language: English
- Series: Swallows and Amazons
- Genre: Children's books
- Publisher: Jonathan Cape
- Publication date: 1931
- Publication place: United Kingdom
- Media type: Print (Hardcover & Paperback)
- ISBN: 978-1-56792-421-3 (David R. Godine, Publisher: paperback, 1986, 2010)
- Preceded by: Swallows and Amazons
- Followed by: Peter Duck

Swallowdale is a children's adventure novel by English author Arthur Ransome first published by Jonathan Cape in 1931. The book features Walker siblings (the Swallows) and Blackett sisters (the Amazons), camping in the hills and moorland country around a lake, with Maria Turner, the Blacketts' Great Aunt, acting as an antagonist. It is the second book in the Swallows and Amazons series; preceded by Swallows and Amazons and followed by Peter Duck.

Ransome was living in the Lake District and he drew on his experiences and memories of encounters over many years with the local farming community. Ransome had often climbed the Old Man of Coniston and in the book this becomes the children's Kanchenjunga. Expeditions to Kanchenjunga in the Himalayas had been much in the news while Ransome was writing the book.

== Plot summary ==
Returning to Wild Cat Island for their second summer holiday by the Lake, the Swallows find the Amazons and Captain Flint suffering from "native trouble". Great Aunt Maria has come to stay and she is a stickler for "proper" behaviour, demanding that the Amazon pirates act like "young ladies" who are on hand and on time for meals. Despite this, Nancy and Peggy escape the Great Aunt and arrange a rendezvous with the Walkers. On the way there, the Swallow hits Pike Rock and sinks. All are saved and the boat salvaged but she needs repairing, so camping on Wild Cat Island is impossible. Captain John of the Swallows learns life lessons about following his instincts while commanding a ship, and has time to reflect on the accident while he fashions a new mast for Swallow. An alternative to camping on Wild Cat Island presents itself when Roger and Titty find a hidden valley, Swallowdale, up on the moors above the lake.

The Swallows discover a secret cave in Swallowdale, a trout tarn, the "knickerbockerbreaker", and enjoy new adventures of lakeland life. They meet local woodcutters and farmers, watch a hound trail, and trek across the moors. The Amazons are only able to escape at intervals, and are punished for getting home late by being made to memorise and recite poetry. Eventually the Great Aunt leaves and the Swallows and Amazons mount an expedition to sleep under the stars on the summit of nearby commanding hill "Kanchenjunga" (in reality The Old Man of Coniston). While there, they discover a box with a small coin left by the Blackett's parents and uncle on climbing the "Matterhorn" thirty years earlier.

Next morning, Roger and Titty return to Swallowdale, following trails through the bracken across the moor, while John and Susan ferry the Amazons' camping gear by boat. Both parties get lost in a thick and sudden fog. After it lifts the older children arrive to find an empty camp. Titty turns up later, after hitching a ride with some woodsmen and explains that Roger sprained his ankle and will be spending the night with Young Billy, the (old) charcoal burner. The next day the injured Roger is carried back to the camp on a stretcher.

The Swallow is finally repaired and the book ends with a race and a feast, followed by a return to Wild Cat Island.

== Reception ==
Natasha Walter writing for The Guardian stated: "Swallowdale is quite an achievement. It's a book where nothing, really, happens - and yet even young readers learn to be caught and held by the richness of its sensual detail. Here are children building a camp, walking up a hill, watching a hunt, fishing for trout, eating breakfast. Where is the plot? Where is the struggle? Ransome is the child's precursor to Proust and Woolf; he suggests the intense pleasures of plotlessness."

Swallowdale was originally dedicated to his friend Lascelles Abercrombie's daughter Elizabeth.

== See also ==
- List of characters in Arthur Ransome books
