= Eko Eko Azarak: Wizard of Darkness (video game) =

1995 video game

- Cover art with actress Kimika Yoshino
- Developer: WiZ
- Publisher: PolyGram
- Platform: PlayStation
- Release: JP: December 29, 1995
- Genre: Visual novel
- Mode: Single player

Eko Eko Azarak: Wizard of Darkness (Note: Japanese: エコエコアザラク: Wizard of Darkness) is a Japanese visual novel game based on the film Eko Eko Azarak: Wizard of Darkness (1995). In Eko Eko Azarak: Wizard of Darkness, the dark magician Misa Kuroi transfers to a high school after being attracted to the strange magical powers she senses there. At the end of the day, Misa and her friends find themselves trapped at the school by a mysterious magician. One by one, her classmates are killed within the school's confines.

In the game, the player reads through a story with text over background images. As the story progresses, the player is given text options on how to choose what happens next in the game to progress through the story. In some instances, a heart-beat is heard, and if the player does not choose fast enough, the computer will choose the option for them.

As the film was based on the 1970s manga series Eko Eko Azarak, the game features images from both the original series and the film. The game was part of a wave of horror-themed PlayStation games that appeared in the mid-1990s. While reviews in Dengeki PlayStation and Famicom Tsūshin complimented the use of sound in the game, they ultimately found the story complicated due to characters appearing and dying too quickly to empathize with them and that the game lacked more images or full motion video from the film.

== Background and development ==
Before the release of the video game, Eko Eko Azarak was a manga by Shinichi Koga that was first published in Japan by Weekly Shōnen Champion on September 1, 1975. The manga follows Misa, a popular high school student who is secretly a young witch who travels Japan to get revenge on her foes. The manga ended its initial run on April 9, 1979.

In the early 1990s, there was a boom period for school-set ghost stories in Japan. The initial trend originated from a school teacher named Toru Tsunemitsu, who began to share ghost stories with his young students, with many being set in schools. These stories were published by Kodansha in 1990 under the title Gakkō no Kaidan, and became very popular. In 1995, Toho released a film series called School Ghost Stories (1995), which had three follow-ups. On April 8, 1995, a film adaptation of Koga's manga was released, titled Eko Eko Azarak: Wizard of Darkness (1995), which was another school-set story. By the mid-1990s, horror games featuring school-set ghost stories and students became particularly prevalent on PlayStation. Among them, was Eko Eko Azarak: Wizard of Darkness, an adaptation of the 1995 film.

The game was developed by WiZ. While WiZ had made games for consoles such as the Super Famicom and PlayStation, they would be predominantly later known for being the developers of Tamagotchi (1996) and Digimon (1997). In the game, illustrations by Koga and footage from the film are used throughout.

== Plot and gameplay ==
In Eko Eko Azarak: Wizard of Darkness, the dark magician Misa Kuroi transfers to a high school after being attracted to the strange magical powers she senses there. At the end of the day, Misa and her friends find themselves trapped at the school by a mysterious magician. One by one, her classmates are killed within the school's confines.

In an overview of the game in Dengeki PlayStation described Eko Eko Azarak: Wizard of Darkness as a sound novel. Mark Kretzschmar and Sara Raffel, authors of The History and Allure of Interactive Visual Novels, described the term used to primarily define Japanese games that rely on graphics and sounds instead of puzzles to tell a story and was more generally interchangeable with visual novels.

The game takes place from the perspective of the character Misa. The game is split into five chapters. In the game, the player progresses by selecting a text option to progress the story. There is a time limit in play in the game. Sometimes when having to choose the game, a faint heartbeat can be heard. If the player does not make a choice quickly, the game will choose for them. The game allows the player to place bookmarks during parts of the story during gameplay, which allows them to return to that part of the story again. While the player can only save at the end of a chapter, bookmarks allow them to return to any point in the story they place them at. In later chapters, it becomes more likely that making a wrong choice will lead to a preemptive game over scenario.

== Release and reception ==
Reception

Review scores
Publication	Score
Dengeki PlayStation	45/100, 45/100, 65/100, 40/100
Famicom Tsūshin	5/10, 5/10, 5/10, 5/10

Eko Eko Azarak: Wizard of Darkness was released for the PlayStation on December 29, 1995.

Sound and graphics In both Dengeki PlayStation and Famicom Tsūshin, reviews complimented the use of sound in the game create a sense of fear. In Famicom Tsūshin the reviewer said that both full motion video and images of character are not used much, which led to one of the reviewers in the magazine saying that the names of classmates keep appearing and get killed off before you can even know who they are.

While one reviewer in Famicom Tsūshin lamented the lack of extra stories, one reviewer found it odd that you played as Misa instead of being yourself in the game, saying that it was hard to empathize with her. One reviewer in Dengeki PlayStation said that the game appeared to be aiming to be a deluxe version of Otogirisō (1992), but as there were too many abrupt story developments the game just did not feel polished enough.

In terms of gameplay, two reviewers in Dengeki PlayStation felt the game was too short, with one saying it could be completed within half-an-hour. While a Famicom Tsūshin said there were not enough relevant choices to make it an enjoyable sound novel, another found the heart-beat-themed time limit an unwelcome feature as it did not give them time to think of the proper choice at a branching part in the narrative.

== See also ==
- List of PlayStation games
- List of video games based on anime or manga
- List of video games based on films
