= Kenji Wu discography =

Taiwanese Musician

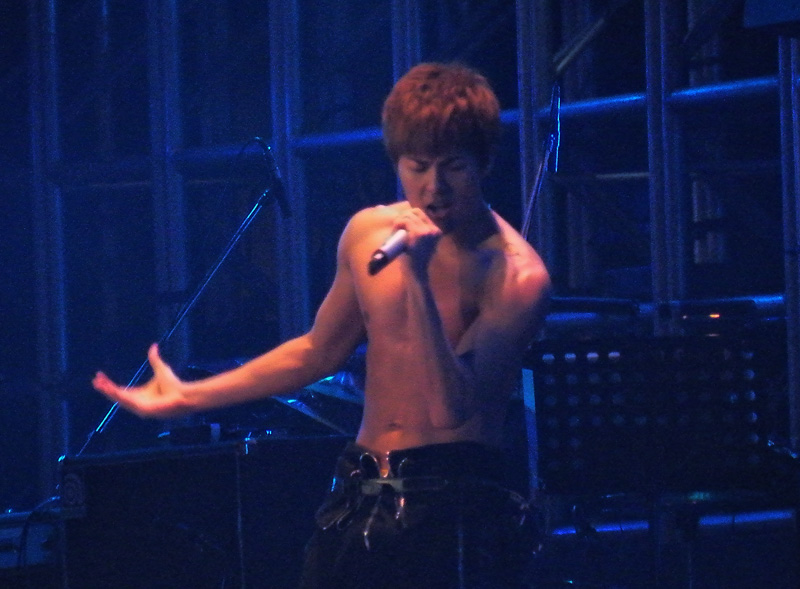
- Wu in 2011
- Studio albums: 10
- EPs: 3
- Compilation albums: 2
- Singles: 9

Taiwanese singer-songwriter Kenji Wu has released ten studio albums, three extended plays, nine singles and two compilation albums. He released his debut album, Tomorrow, Alone, in 2000.

== Studio albums ==
English title	Original title	Release date	Label	Format
Tomorrow, Alone	一個人的Tomorrow	1 November 2000	Virgin Records	CD
First Creative Album	吳克群	1 November 2004	Seed Music	CD
The Kenji Show	大頑家	1 October 2005	Seed Music	CD
A General Order	將軍令	13 October 2006	Seed Music	CD
Poems for You	為你寫詩	14 March 2008	Seed Music	CD
Love Me, Hate Me	愛我 恨我	16 October 2010	Seed Music	CD
How To Deal With Loneliness?	寂寞來了怎麼辦？	28 July 2012	Seed Music	CD
On The Way To The Stars	數星星的人	10 April 2015	Warner Music Taiwan	CD, digital download
Humorous Life	人生超幽默	30 December 2016	Warner Music Taiwan	CD, digital download
I Am Listening	你說 我聽著呢	7 August 2020	Pourquoi Pas Music	CD, digital download

== Extended plays ==
English title	Original title	Release date	Label	Format
Lao Zi Says	老子說	1 April 2007	Seed Music	CD
Heart To Heart	把心拉近	15 May 2009	Seed Music	CD
Bingdola	冰的啦	29 October 2013	Sony Music Taiwan	CD / Digital Download

== Compilation albums ==
English title	Original title	Release date	Label	Format
MagiK Great Hits	—N/a	18 October 2008	Seed Music	CD
Creative Album Selection	精選創作輯	27 May 2013	Sony Music Taiwan	CD, Digital Download

== Singles ==
English title	Original title	Release date	Label	Notes
Love is the Power	愛是力量	01 July 2009	Seed Music	Theme Song of The Magic Aster
Stellar Transformation	星辰變	15 April 2011	Seed Music	Theme Song of the same name
Half and Half	一半一半	06 September 2011	Seed Music	Ending Theme Song of Love Recipe
Secret Love	愛的秘方	06 September 2011	Seed Music	Ending Theme Song of Love Recipe
If You Can't Love As Well	如果不能好好愛	11 February 2014	Sony Music Taiwan	The Old Cinderella Movie Theme Song
Love and Call 999	愛情呼救999	20 May 2014	Sony Music Taiwan	Collaborated with Xian Zi
Hero of Ambition	英雄野望	17 June 2014	Sony Music Taiwan	Theme Song of the Game "Cao Cao Zhi Ye Wang" (曹操之野望)
See the Future	未來先見	23 September 2014	Warner Music Taiwan	Audi A3 Commercial Theme Song
Weirdo You (Guitar Ver.)	奇怪的你 (小清新版)	20 January 2017	Harmity Entertainment	
