= Suzanna Hamilton =

English actress (born 1960)

- Born: 12 September 1960 (age 65); London, England
- Other names: Zanna; Suzanne
- Education: Central School of Speech and Drama
- Occupation: Actress
- Years active: 1972–present

Suzanna Hamilton (born 12 September 1960) is an English actress, notable for playing the role of Julia in the 1984 film adaptation of George Orwell's classic novel Nineteen Eighty-Four, as well as other film roles including Tess (1979), Brimstone and Treacle (1982), Wetherby (1985), and Out of Africa (1985). She has had numerous television roles such as the ITV drama Wish Me Luck (1988), the BBC medical drama Casualty (1993–94), and the STV drama McCallum (1995–97).

== Life and career ==
Hamilton was born in London on September 12, 1960. In 1973, Hamilton received acting training at the Anna Scher Theatre School in Islington. She was a student at the Central School of Speech and Drama in Swiss Cottage, Camden. She became a protégée of filmmaker Claude Whatham, who discovered her in a children's experimental theatre in north London in the early 1970s.

In 1974, she appeared in her first feature film, the Whatham-directed Swallows and Amazons. Billed as Zanna Hamilton, she was cast as Susan Walker, one of four young siblings collectively known as "the Swallows", who go on a camping and sailing holiday in the Lake District during the summer of 1929. Whatham later directed Hamilton as Princess Alice in the BBC miniseries, Disraeli (1978).

For her first appearance in a big-budget film, Hamilton played Izz Huett, the lovesick dairymaid, in the Roman Polanski film Tess (1979), based on Thomas Hardy's Tess of the d'Urbervilles, which starred Nastassja Kinski in the title role. She also appeared as one of the boarding school girls who organise a strike against the Ministry of Education in The Wildcats of St. Trinian's (1980).

Hamilton's next significant role was in the Richard Loncraine film Brimstone and Treacle (1982), based on Dennis Potter's play of the same name. Hamilton starred as Patricia Bates, the traumatised, catatonic daughter of a devoutly religious, middle aged Home Counties couple (Denholm Elliott and Joan Plowright) whose lives are changed by a demonic drifter and con man who calls himself Martin Taylor, played by Sting. The following year, Hamilton was featured in BBC-TV's paranormal mystery, A Pattern of Roses, with Helena Bonham Carter.

Hamilton was a member of the BBC's Radio Drama Company.

Hamilton was cast as Julia opposite John Hurt as Winston Smith in the Michael Radford film Nineteen Eighty-Four (1984), based on George Orwell's dystopian novel. She obtained the role through the casting agency of the Anna Scher Theatre School. She was one of the school's earliest alumni, and the theatre is acknowledged in the film's closing credits. This performance raised her profile as a film actress and attracted critical praise, particularly from Vincent Canby in The New York Times. However, her work was largely overshadowed by the death of fellow cast member Richard Burton, who delivered his final screen performance in the role of O'Brien, as well as by post-release controversy over the film's musical score.

In 1985, Hamilton starred in British playwright David Hare's film Wetherby, opposite Vanessa Redgrave. Her next role was as Felicity in Sydney Pollack's Academy Award-winning Out of Africa, based on the memoirs of the Danish writer Isak Dinesen, and starring Meryl Streep, Robert Redford and Klaus Maria Brandauer.

By the latter half of the decade, the majority of her screen roles were in obscure European films made in exotic locations as well as numerous British television dramas. In the 1986 German film, Devil's Paradise, which was shot in Thailand and loosely based on Joseph Conrad's 1915 novel Victory, Hamilton was cast as a saxophonist in an all-woman band touring seedy hotels and nightclubs in Southeast Asia. Her character, Julie, escapes a life of sexual slavery by fleeing with an eccentric German adventurer, played by Jürgen Prochnow, and the two of them take refuge on an island near Indonesia, which is already populated by a savage native warrior tribe. Also in 1986, Hamilton starred in the well-received television drama Johnny Bull, a film developed at the National Playwrights' Conference of the Eugene O'Neill Theatre Center and filmed in Tennessee. In this film, a period piece set in the mid-1940s just after VE Day, she was cast as Iris Kovacs, a lighthearted Cockney bride who travels to rural Pennsylvania to live with her new American G.I. husband (Peter MacNicol) and his working class Hungarian-immigrant coal-mining family; Colleen Dewhurst and Kathy Bates starred in supporting roles. That same year, Hamilton appeared as Emily Barkstone in Hold the Dream, the second of the three BBC miniseries based on Barbara Taylor Bradford's popular "Emma Harte" novels about the fortunes of a retail empire and the machinations of the business élite across three generations.

In 1987, she played the spirited but careless Anglo-French SOE spy, Matty Firman, in Wish Me Luck — an LWT miniseries, this one set in occupied France during World War II. In 1988, she appeared opposite Jon Finch in another low-budget German film, a short called The Voice, about six people who are held captive overnight on a floating discothèque. In 1989, she starred as the inscrutable femme fatale Anna Raven in the BBC miniseries of Never Come Back, a noirish conspiracy thriller based on the celebrated 1941 novel by John Mair, which takes place on the eve of the London Blitz during the so-called "Phoney War" of 1939–40. Hamilton also acted in the 1990 British television film, Small Zones, as a strong-willed Russian poet whose subversive writings have led to her indefinite imprisonment in a Soviet holding cell.

Suzanna Hamilton played the role of Regine Kleinschmidt in the TV movie Murder East, Murder West, set just before and just after the Fall of the Berlin Wall.

In 1991, she appeared as Amelia, one of the five daughters placed under house arrest by their domineering mother, in the BBC adaptation of Spanish poet Federico García Lorca's play The House of Bernarda Alba; Glenda Jackson starred in the title role. She also had a supporting role in a 1992 TV film of Barbara Cartland's Regency-period bodice-ripper, Duel of Hearts.

Her next commercial film role was in a low-budget Gothic horror romance, Tale of a Vampire (1992), written and directed by a 27-year-old Anglo-Japanese film student, Shimako Satō. Hamilton made a dual appearance: first as Anne, a librarian in present-day London grieving the untimely death of her boyfriend; then as Anne's 19th century doppelgänger, Virginia Clemm, the real-life wife of Edgar Allan Poe—who, in the film, also happens to be the long-lost mistress of a lonely, centuries-old vampire played by Julian Sands. In 1993, she had a recurring role as Dr. Karen Goodliffe on the British TV hospital drama series Casualty. In 1995, she appeared as John Hannah's love interest, Joanna Sparks, on the ITV crime series McCallum.

In 1997, she appeared in The Island on Bird Street, a Danish period drama made in the Dogme 95 style, about an 11-year-old Jewish boy who hides from the Nazis in occupied Poland during World War II before he is reunited with his father. In this film, Hamilton had a brief cameo as the mother of a girl whom the boy befriends. More recently, she appeared as Vivienne in the 2005 short film Benjamin's Struggle, described as "a compelling story set in 1930s Nazi Germany, about a nine-year-old Jewish boy who attempts to steal the original manuscript of Adolf Hitler's Mein Kampf, believing that it will topple the Third Reich and end the suffering of his family". In 2006, she appeared as Helen Gillespie in the ITV series, Jane Hall. In 2007, she appeared as Dr. Hillary Slayton in the children's television series, Dinosapien, which was filmed on location in southern Alberta, Canada. In 2015 she played "Barbara" in the BBC drama Doctors and in 2017 she played "Sarah" in the BBC series The Cuckoo's Calling.

== Theatre ==
Hamilton is an accomplished theatre and radio actress. She made her first West End appearance on the London stage in 1982 as part of the original cast production of Tom Stoppard's play, The Real Thing. In 1993, she played the lead as a Welsh maid in the Bush Theatre's production of Lucinda Coxon's Waiting at the Water's Edge; in 2002, she was cast as Creusa in a Gate Theatre production of Euripides' Ion; and in early 2005, she appeared as Dora, a woman incarcerated in a 1920s asylum in the Salisbury Playhouse's production of Charlotte Jones' chamber drama, Airswimming. She also appeared in a 1991 audiobook recording of Julian Barnes' novel about a love triangle called Talking It Over and has been in many radio dramas. In May 2018 she played Shakespeare's Juliet (in old age) for The Theatre, Chipping Norton, in Ben Power's A Tender Thing and in August 2019 she portrayed a Rhodesian estate owner in My One True Friend at the Tristan Bates Theatre, London. In 2022 she performed at the Assembly George Square Studios in We Should Definitely Have More Dancing to critical acclaim.

== Personal life ==
Hamilton spent a short time away from acting in major films to bring up her son but continued to feature in television roles and in theatre and voice work.

== Filmography ==
=== Film ===
Year	Title	Role	Notes
1974	Swallows and Amazons	Susan Walker	Credited as Zanna Hamilton
1979	Tess	Izz Huett	
1980	The Wildcats of St. Trinians	Matilda	
1982	Brimstone and Treacle	Patricia Bates	
1984	Goodie-Two-Shoes	Veronica	
1984	Nineteen Eighty-Four	Julia	
1985	Wetherby	Karen Creasy	
1985	Out of Africa	Felicity	
1987	Devil's Paradise (Des Teufels Paradies)	Julie	
1989	The Voice (Die Stimme)	Julia	
1992	Tale of a Vampire	Anne / Virginia	
1997	The Island on Bird Street	Stasya's mother	
2005	Benjamin's Struggle	Vivienne	
2016	My Feral Heart	Pete's mother	
2022	Little Mary	Mary	Selected for LA Shorts Fest, 2022
TBD	Ride the Snake †	Harper	Post-production

Key
†	Denotes films that have not yet been released

=== Television ===
Year	Title	Role	Notes
1972	The Edwardians	Child	uncredited
1978	Disraeli	Princess Alice	
1979	One Fine Day	Linda	
1983	A Pattern of Roses	Rebecca	
1986	Johnny Bull	Iris	
1986	Hold The Dream	Emily Barsktone	
1987	Wish Me Luck	Matty Firman	
1989	Streetwise		
1989	Saracen		one episode: "Starcross"
1989	Never Come Back	Anna Raven	
1990	Murder East – Murder West	Regine Kleinschmidt	
1990	Small Zones	Irina Ratushinskaya	
1990	TECX	Ingrid Hauptmann	one episode: "The Sea Takes It All
1991	A New Lease of Death	Elizabeth Crilling	
1991	Boon	Judy Simpson	one episode: "Cab Rank Cowboys"
1991	The House of Bernarda Alba	Amelia	
1992	A Masculine Ending	Veronica Puddephat	
1991	Duel of Hearts	Harriet Wantage	
1992	Inspector Morse	Emma Cryer	one episode: "Absolute Conviction"
1993–94	Casualty	Karen Goodliffe	
1994/1999	The Bill	Gaye Fraser / Jo Merton	two episodes: "The Cold Consumer" (1994); "Follow Through" (1999)
1995	A Relative Stranger	Jenny Bell	
1995	McCallum	Joanna Sparks	
1996	A Virtual Stranger	Jenny Bell	
1998	Jonathan Creek	Hannah	one episode: "Black Canary"
2004	New Tricks	Imogen Hoult	one episode: 1.3
2006	Jane Hall	Helen Gillsepie	
2007	Dinosapien	Dr. Hillary Slayton	
2016	Silent Witness	Gabriella Lubas	two episodes: "In Plain Sight" Parts 1 and 2
2015/2017	Doctors	Cath Barnes / Barbara Flint	two episodes: "Other Side of the Track" (2015); "The Fruit Forbidden" (2017)
2017	The Cuckoo's Calling	Sarah	
2021	EastEnders	Jackie	
