= Unfair 2: The Answer =

- Poster
- Directed by: Shimako Satō
- Based on: Unfair
- Starring: Ryoko Shinohara; Kōichi Satō; Takayuki Yamada; Sadao Abe; Masaya Kato; Mitsuru Fukikoshi; Nao Ōmori; Susumu Terajima; Teruyuki Kagawa
- Release date: September 17, 2011 (Japan)
- Running time: 109 minutes
- Country: Japan
- Language: Japanese
- Box office: ¥2.34 billion

Unfair 2: The Answer (アンフェア the answer) is a 2011 Japanese action film directed by Shimako Satō. It is a sequel to Unfair: The Movie, and was followed by Unfair: The End in 2015. The three films are based on the Japanese television drama Unfair.

== Cast ==
- Ryoko Shinohara
- Kōichi Satō
- Takayuki Yamada
- Sadao Abe
- Masaya Kato
- Mitsuru Fukikoshi
- Nao Ōmori
- Susumu Terajima
- Teruyuki Kagawa

== Reception ==
It was number 1 at the Japanese box office on the week ending on September 18 and again (according to Kogyo Tsushinsha) on the following week. As of September 25 it has grossed US$13,809,812. The film grossed ¥2.34 billion at the Japanese box office.
