= Itoshisa to Setsunasa to Kokoro Zuyosa to =

1994 single by Ryoko Shinohara

Single by Ryōko Shinohara

from the album Lady Generation: Shukujo no Sedai
- Language: Japanese
- English title: Of the Beloved, of Sadness, of Responsibility
- B-side: "Good Luck"
- Released: July 21, 1994
- Recorded: 1994
- Genre: J-pop; dance-pop
- Length: 4:22
- Label: Cha-Dance / Epic / Sony Records
- Songwriter: Tetsuya Komuro
- Producer: Tetsuya Komuro

Ryōko Shinohara singles chronology
"Sincerely" (1994)	"Itoshisa to Setsunasa to Kokoro Zuyosa to" (1994)	"Motto Motto" (1995)

Music videos
- "Itoshisa to Setsunasa to Kokoro Zuyosa to" on YouTube

"Itoshisa to Setsunasa to Kokoro Zuyosa to 2023"

Single by Ryōko Shinohara
- Language: Japanese
- English title: Of the Beloved, of Sadness, of Responsibility
- Released: September 17, 2023 (Digital); September 27, 2023 (CD)
- Recorded: 2022
- Genre: J-pop; dance-pop
- Length: 4:19
- Label: Avex Trax
- Songwriter: Tetsuya Komuro
- Producer: Tetsuya Komuro

Ryōko Shinohara singles chronology
"Crazy for You" (2022)	"Itoshisa to Setsunasa to Kokoro Zuyosa to 2023" (2023)
- "Itoshisa to Setsunasa to Kokoro Zuyosa to 2023" on YouTube

"Itoshisa to Setsunasa to Kokoro Zuyosa to" (恋しさとせつなさと心強さと; lit. "Of the Beloved, of Sadness, of Responsibility") is the fourth single by Japanese singer Ryōko Shinohara, released on July 21, 1994, by Epic Records/Sony Music Entertainment Japan under the Tokyo Performance Doll label Cha-Dance. Written and produced by Tetsuya Komuro, the song was used in the Japanese release of the 1994 anime film Street Fighter II: The Animated Movie during the scene where Ryu and Ken Masters team up to fight Vega/M. Bison. The B-side is "GooD-LucK", which was also featured in the film as the ending theme. An instrumental version of the song plays in the secret "Dramatic Battle" mode in the original Japanese version of Street Fighter Alpha, which also involves a team battle in which Ryu and Ken face Bison at the same time.

The single was Shinohara's breakthrough hit, staying at No. 1 on Oricon's singles chart for two weeks and peaking at No. 3 on Oricon's year-ending singles chart. It also made Shinohara the first female artist in Japan to sell two million singles. The song received the Excellence Award and the Arrangement Award at the 36th Japan Record Awards, the Wired Music Excellence Award at the 27th Japan Cable Awards, and the Best 5 Singles Award at the Japan Gold Disc Awards. Shinohara performed the song on the 45th and the 73rd Kōhaku Uta Gassen.

In 2019, the song was nominated for the Movie Theme Song Award (映画主題歌賞, Eiga Shudaika-shō) for the years 1989 to 1999 at Sony Music Entertainment Japan's Heisei Anison Awards (平成アニソン大賞, Heisei Anison Taishō). In 2022, Shinohara and Komuro reunited to re-record the song as the Japanese image song for Street Fighter 6.

== Track listing ==
All music is composed and arranged by Tetsuya Komuro.

=== 1994 CD single ===
No.	Title	Length
1.	"Itoshisa to Setsunasa to Kokoro Zuyosa to" ((恋しさとせつなさと心強さと; lit. "Of the Beloved, of Sadness, of Responsibility"))	4:22
2.	"GooD-LucK"	6:46
3.	"Itoshisa to Setsunasa to Kokoro Zuyosa to" (Original Karaoke)	4:22
Total length:		15:30

=== 2023 CD single ===
CD
No.	Title	Length
1.	"Itoshisa to Setsunasa to Kokoro Zuyosa to 2023"	4:19
2.	"Itoshisa to Setsunasa to Kokoro Zuyosa to 2023" (Original Karaoke)	4:19
3.	"Itoshisa to Setsunasa to Kokoro Zuyosa to 2023" (SF6 Edit)	2:04
4.	"Itoshisa to Setsunasa to Kokoro Zuyosa to 2023" (Instrumental)	4:19
Total length:		15:01

Limited edition Blu-ray
No.	Title	Length
1.	"Itoshisa to Setsunasa to Kokoro Zuyosa to 2023" (Music video)
2.	"Itoshisa to Setsunasa to Kokoro Zuyosa to 2023" (Making clip)

== Charts ==
=== Weekly charts ===
Chart (1994)	Peak position
Japanese Oricon Singles Chart	1

=== Year-end charts ===
Chart (1994)	Peak position
Japanese Oricon Singles Chart	3

== Certifications ==
Region	Certification	Certified units/sales
Japan (RIAJ)	4× Platinum	1,600,000^{^}
Japan (RIAJ) Digital single	Platinum	250,000^{*}
^{*} Sales figures based on certification alone.^{^} Shipments figures based on certification alone.

== Cover versions ==
- Purple Days covered the song as the B-side of their 2010 single "Tsuyokunare".
- m.o.v.e covered the song on their 2010 album anim.o.v.e 02.
- MAX covered the song on their 2010 cover album Be MAX.
- AAA covered the song as the B-side of the Jacket C release of their 2011 single "Daiji na Koto".
- You Kikkawa covered the song on her 2012 cover album Vocalist?.
- Hatsune Miku covered the song on the 2012 compilation album Tetsuya Komuro Meets Vocaloid.
- Tomomi Kahara covered the song on her 2014 cover album Memories -Kahara Covers-.
- Machico covered the song on her 2014 album Colors.
- Minami Tsuda covered the song on the bonus CD of the limited edition DVD/Blu-ray Vol. 2 release of the 2015 anime series Classroom Crisis.
- May'n covered the song in 2017 for the Nintendo Switch game Ultra Street Fighter II: The Final Challengers. It is also featured on her 2017 album Peace of Smile.
- Raychell (of Raise A Suilen) covered the song for the 2020 game BanG Dream! Girls Band Party!.
