= Lin Chi-ling =

Taiwanese actress and model (born 1974)

- 林志玲
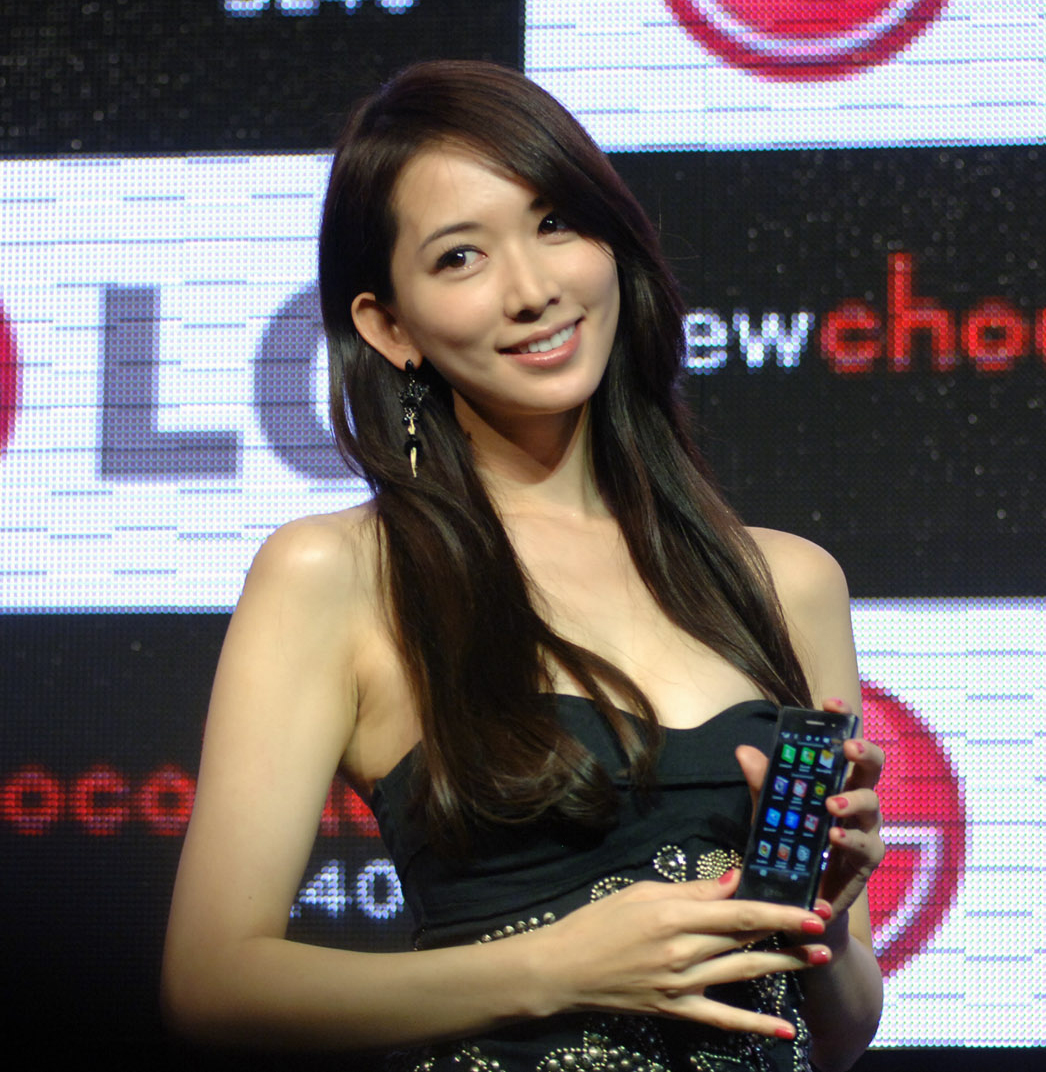
- Lin at the LG New Chocolate (BL40) phone launching event on 4 November 2009, Hong Kong
- Born: November 29, 1974 (age 51); Taipei, Taiwan
- Citizenship: Taiwan
- Education: Taipei Municipal Zhongzheng Junior High School; Bishop Strachan School; University of Toronto
- Occupations: Actress; model; television personality
- Years active: 2002 – present
- Spouse: Akira (m. 2019)
- Children: 1
- Parent(s): Lin Fan-nan (father); Wu Tzu-mei (mother)
- Relatives: Lin Chi-hong (brother)
- Modeling information
- Height: 1.74 m (5 ft 8 1/2 in)
- Hair color: Black
- Eye color: Dark brown
- Agency: Catwalk Production House (2000–2012); ChilingLin Studio (2017–present); Avex Management (Japan)

Chinese name
- Chinese: 林志玲
Transcriptions
Standard Mandarin
- Hanyu Pinyin: Lín Zhìlíng
- Wade–Giles: Lin Chih-ling
Southern Min
- Hokkien POJ: Lím Jî-Léng
- Website: 林志玲 on Instagram

Lin Chi-ling (born 29 November 1974) is a Taiwanese actress, model, and television personality.

== Early life ==
Lin Chi-ling was born on 29 November 1974 in Taipei, Taiwan, to Lin Fan-nan (Chinese: 林繁男) and Wu Tzu-mei (Chinese: 吳慈美). Both of her parents are from Tainan in southern Taiwan. She has an elder brother Lin Chi-hong (Chinese: 林志鴻). She attended Taipei Municipal Zhongzheng Junior High School and at the age of 15 was discovered by model talent scout Lin Chien-huan (Chinese: 林健寰). She later attended Bishop Strachan School in Toronto, Ontario, Canada. She graduated from the University of Toronto in 1997, where she double-majored in Western art history and economics.

After graduating from university, Lin returned to Taiwan. She intended to pursue a career in fine art and sought a position at the Taipei Fine Arts Museum, but was turned away because she lacked a postgraduate degree in the field. Lin continued to model part-time before working as an administrative assistant for the Fubon Cultural and Educational Foundation (富邦文教基金會). In 2000, Lin left Fubon and spent three months studying in Japan, then returned to Taiwan, modeling with Catwalk Production House.

== Career ==
=== Modeling ===
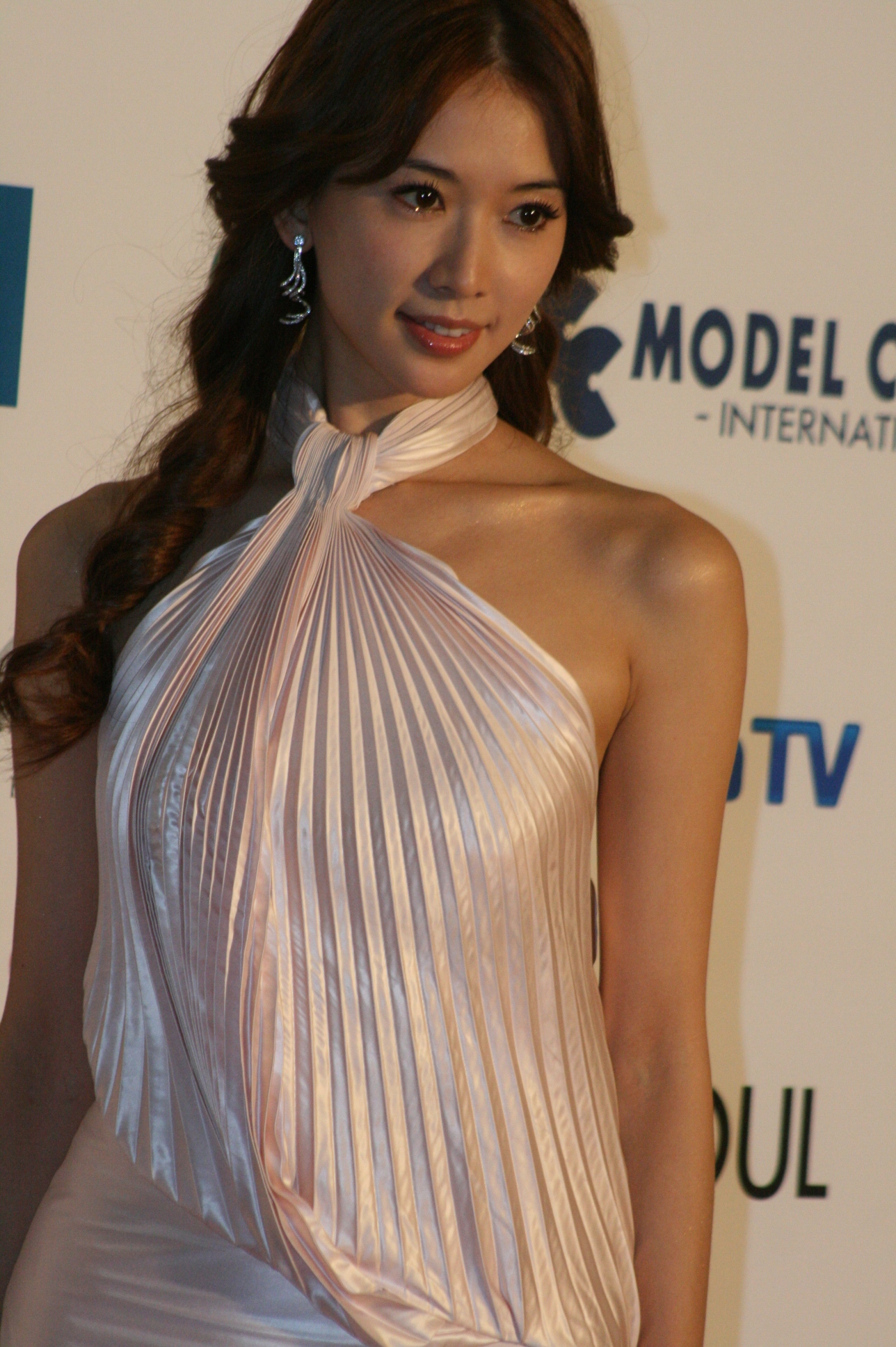
2009 Asia Model Festival Awards, South Korea

In 2002, Lin was invited to model in a television advertisement in Hong Kong. The advertisement received attention and discussion on the internet, and interest in Lin began to grow. The following year, television producer Ke Fu-hung offered Lin a position as hostess of a fashion program on Azio TV. In 2004, Lin starred in a series of advertisements in Taiwan that included big giant building-size posters, billboards, and television commercials. She skyrocketed to fame and sparked a craze for supermodels in Taiwan.

Lin's popularity reached beyond Taiwan in 2004 as she modeled in Hong Kong and mainland Chinese advertisements, and continued when she began doing Japanese advertisements in 2005. From 2004 to 2006, Lin served as Taiwan's goodwill ambassador to the Japan Tourism Association. One of the unintended results of her popularity was that some Japanese pornographic actresses resembling Lin have become more famous and more popular among Chinese fans than their native homeland Japan, and received nicknames given by their Chinese fans in association with Lin, such as in the case of Yui Hatano, who is frequently referred by Chinese fans as AV Lin Chi-ling, and Nozomi Aso (麻生希/あそう のぞみ), who is frequently referred by Chinese fans as AV little Lin Chin-ling.

On 8 August 2005, when shooting an advertisement for Procter & Gamble home products in Dalian, Lin fell from the back of a horse she was riding and was inadvertently trampled. Workers rushed Lin to a nearby hospital where doctors discovered that she had suffered six broken ribs, a punctured left lung, and an accumulation of blood in the pleural cavity. Lin underwent four months of treatment and therapy, and announced in November 2005 that she had completely recovered.

=== Television ===
Lin has had numerous roles in television over her time as a model, being the host of TVBS-G's LA Mode News and Fashion Track. She also co-hosted Golden Melody Awards and the Top Chinese Music Chart Awards in 2005. She starred in the 2010 Fuji TV drama Tsuki no Koibito.

=== Film ===
Lin made her film début as Xiaoqiao in the historical epic Red Cliff, directed by John Woo. In 2009, she starred opposite Jay Chou in the action-adventure film The Treasure Hunter. After that, she shifted her acting career to mainland China, where she starred in films such as Welcome to Shama Town, Say Yes!, Switch, and Monk Comes Down the Mountain.

== Media image ==
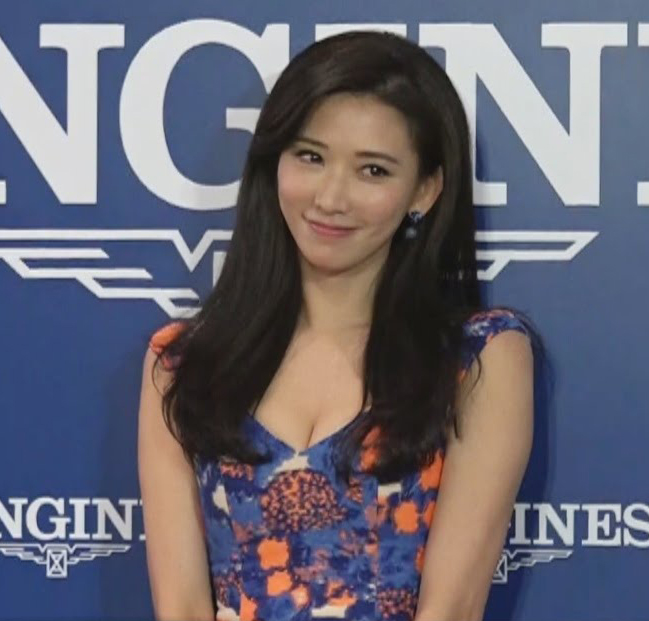
Lin at a Christmas tree lighting charity event, hosted by Longines Taiwan, at the Taipei 101 shopping mall on 5 December 2014

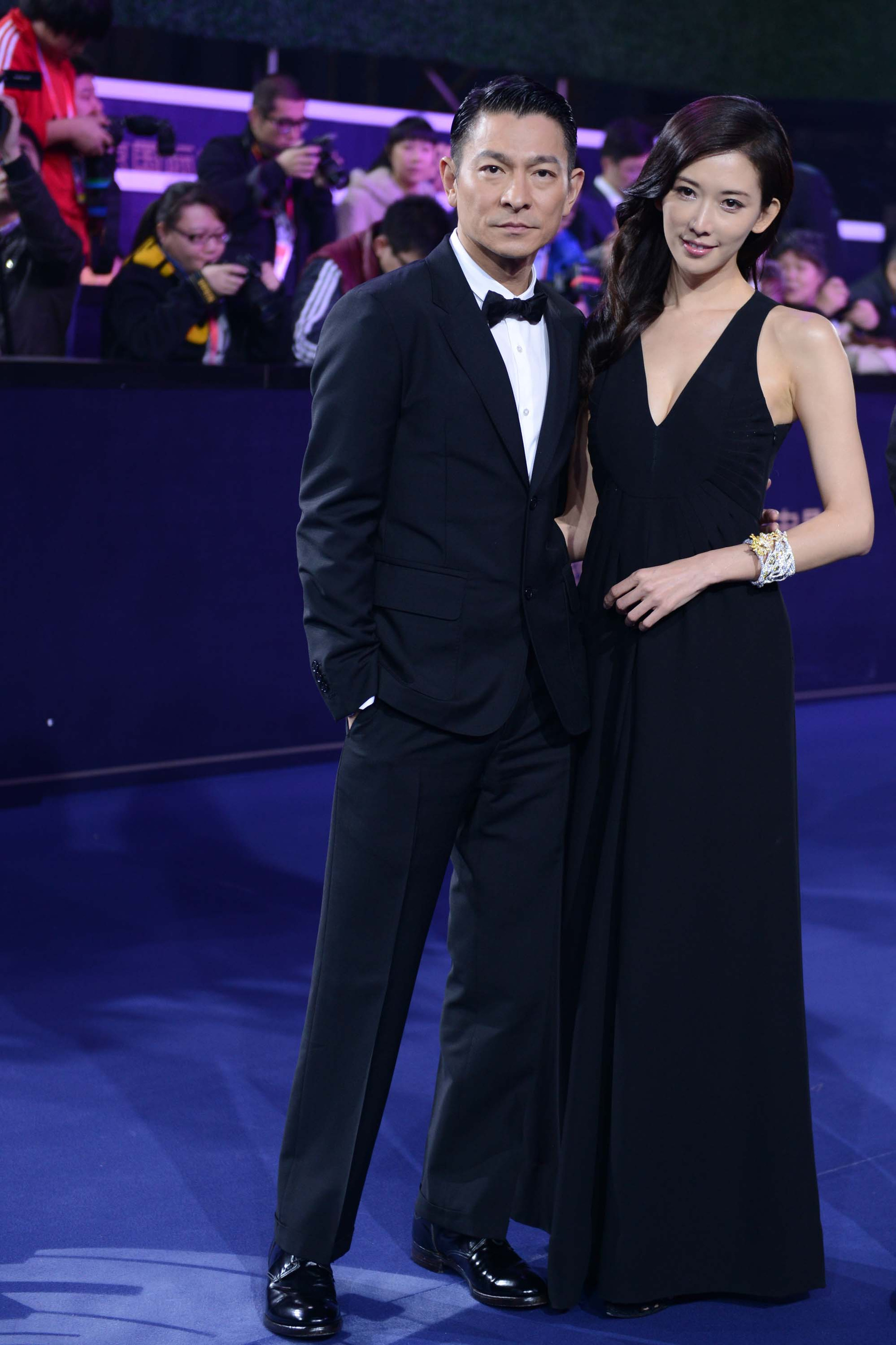
Andy Lau and Lin at Beijing Film Festival 2013

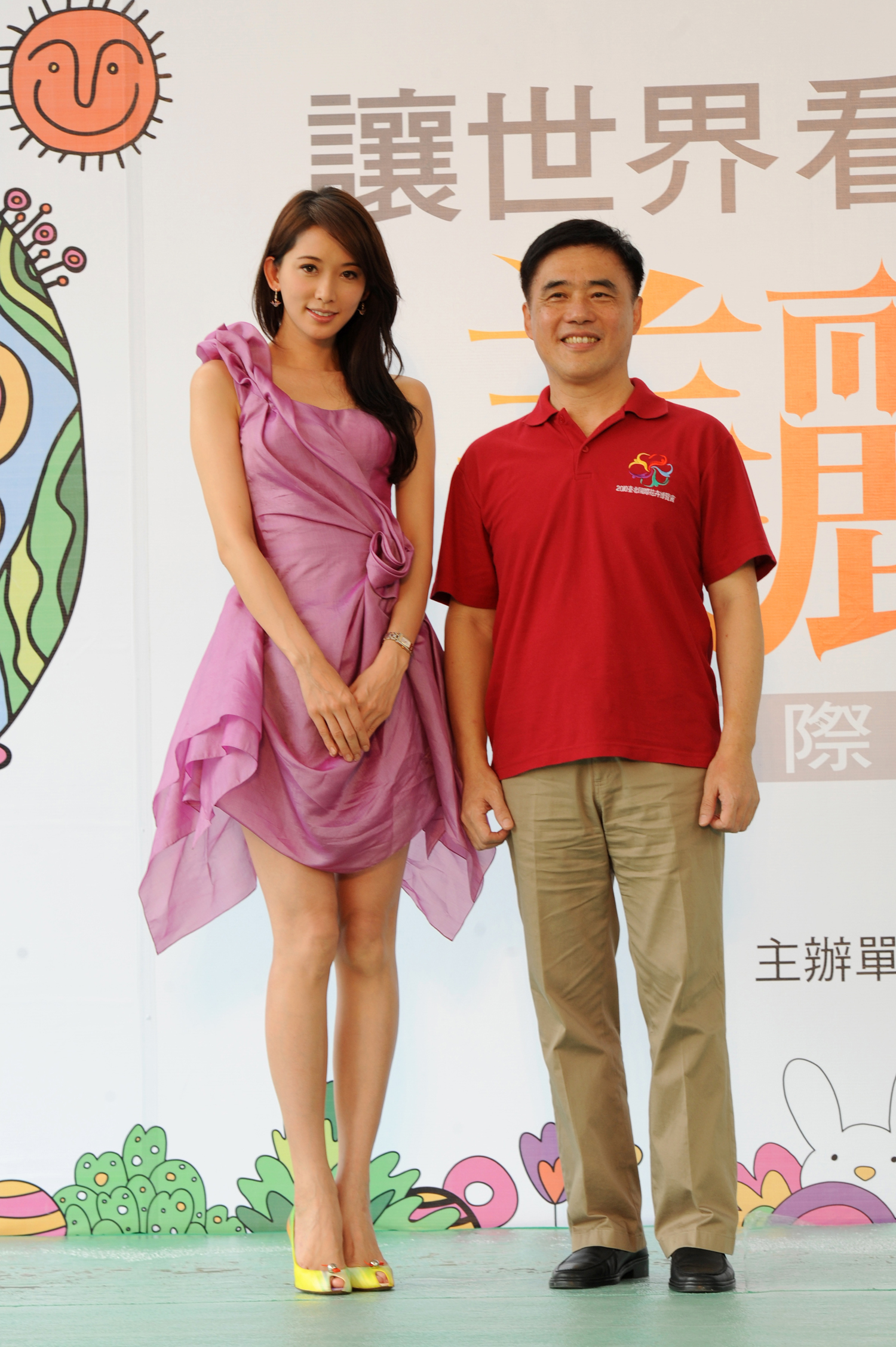
Lin and Mayor of Taipei Hau Lung-pin at the 2010 Taipei International Flora Exposition

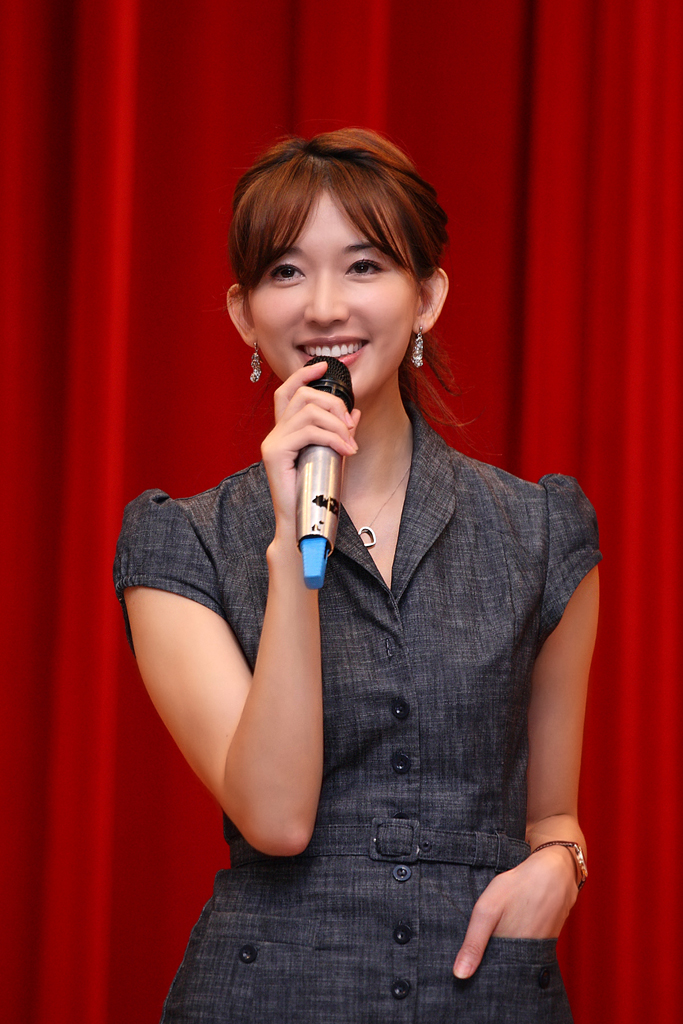
Lin giving a speech at the National Taiwan University of Science and Technology on 13 June 2008

Taiwanese media reported Lin as No. 1 model in the "Richest Celebrities [in Taiwan]" list in 2007, with estimated earnings of NT$60,000,000, in which Jay Chou appeared as No. 1 male singer (with over NT$100,000,000) and Jolin Tsai appeared as No. 1 female singer (with nearly NT$100,000,000).

Hong Kong press reported she was 2009's No. 1 highest-paid model in the Greater China region, followed by Jennifer Du (#2), Gaile Lai (#3) and Lynn Hung (#4). She has continuously ranked No. 1 on Taiwan's "Highest-earning models" list since 2004. Her earnings was estimated to be NT$160,000,000 in 2010, which consisted of those from advertisements (NT$120,000,000) and various such as TV-series appearance in Japan (NT$40,000,000), and NT$200,000,000 in 2011.

In the same year, she established a charity fund Chiling Charity Foundation (財團法人臺北市志玲姊姊慈善基金會), which supports child welfare.

== Personal life ==
=== Relationships ===
Lin was in an on and off relationship with Taiwanese actor Jerry Yan for many years. Yan admitted to reuniting with Lin on 10 November 2017, but this was neither confirmed nor denied by Lin. Around one year later, however, Yan declined to comment on their relationship and Lin denied dating. On 6 June 2019, Lin announced her marriage to Japanese musician Akira. Lin announced the birth of her first child, a son, on 31 January 2022, after undergoing fertility treatments. She has largely stepped back from her career after marriage.

== Filmography ==
Year	English title	Original title	Role	Notes
2008	Red Cliff: Part 1	赤壁	Xiao Qiao	
2009	Red Cliff: Part 2	赤壁	Xiao Qiao	Both parts also released as a single 2½ hour trimmed-down version in 2009
2009	The Magic Aster	馬蘭花	Da Lan	Voice acting
2009	The Treasure Hunter	刺陵	Lan Ting	
2010	Moon Lovers	月の恋人	Liu Xiu Mei	Japan TV Series
2010	Welcome to Shama Town	決戰刹馬鎮	Chun Niang	
2011	Love on Credit	幸福額度	Xiao Hong and Xiao Qing	
2012	Sweetheart Chocolate	甜心巧克力		
2013	Say Yes!	101次求婚	Ye Xun	
2013	Switch	富春山居圖	Lisa	
2014	Who is Undercover	王牌		
2015	Beijing, New York	北京，紐約	Jasmine	
2015	Monk Comes Down the Mountain	道士下山	Yu Zhen	
2017	This Is Not What I Expected	喜歡·你	Private chef	
2017	Didi's Dream	吃吃的愛	Shangguan Lingling	
2018	The Monkey King 3	西遊記·女兒國	River God	
2018	The Faces of My Gene	祖宗十九代	Leia	
2019	Mayday LiFE 3D	五月天人生無限公司3D	Veterinarian	Mayday's concert movie

== Discography ==
=== Singles ===
- "Fly Away" (2009) – written by Jay Chou and Lin Chi-ling
- "The Power of Beauty" (2010)
- "Me and The Moon" (2015)
- "You and me" (2018)

== Awards ==
- "International Artist Credibility Award", 2nd International Television Commercial Arts Festival in 2006
- "Hong Kong Style Icons", Hong Kong Trade Development Council in 2006
- "Top Ten China Beauty", 5th International Beauty Week in 2006
- "Best Fashion Icon at the 2nd Entertainment Award at Beijing in 2007
- "Most popular New Actress", Baidu Award in 2008
- "Best New Actress", Sina Award in 2008
- "Best Asia Star Award", Asia Model Awards at Korea in 2009
- "Most Influential Charity Icon", Charity Star Award in 2009
- "2017 University College Alumni of Influence Award", University of Toronto at Canada in 2017
