= Ryōko Shinohara =

Japanese singer and actress (born 1973)

Ryoko Shinohara
- 篠原 涼子
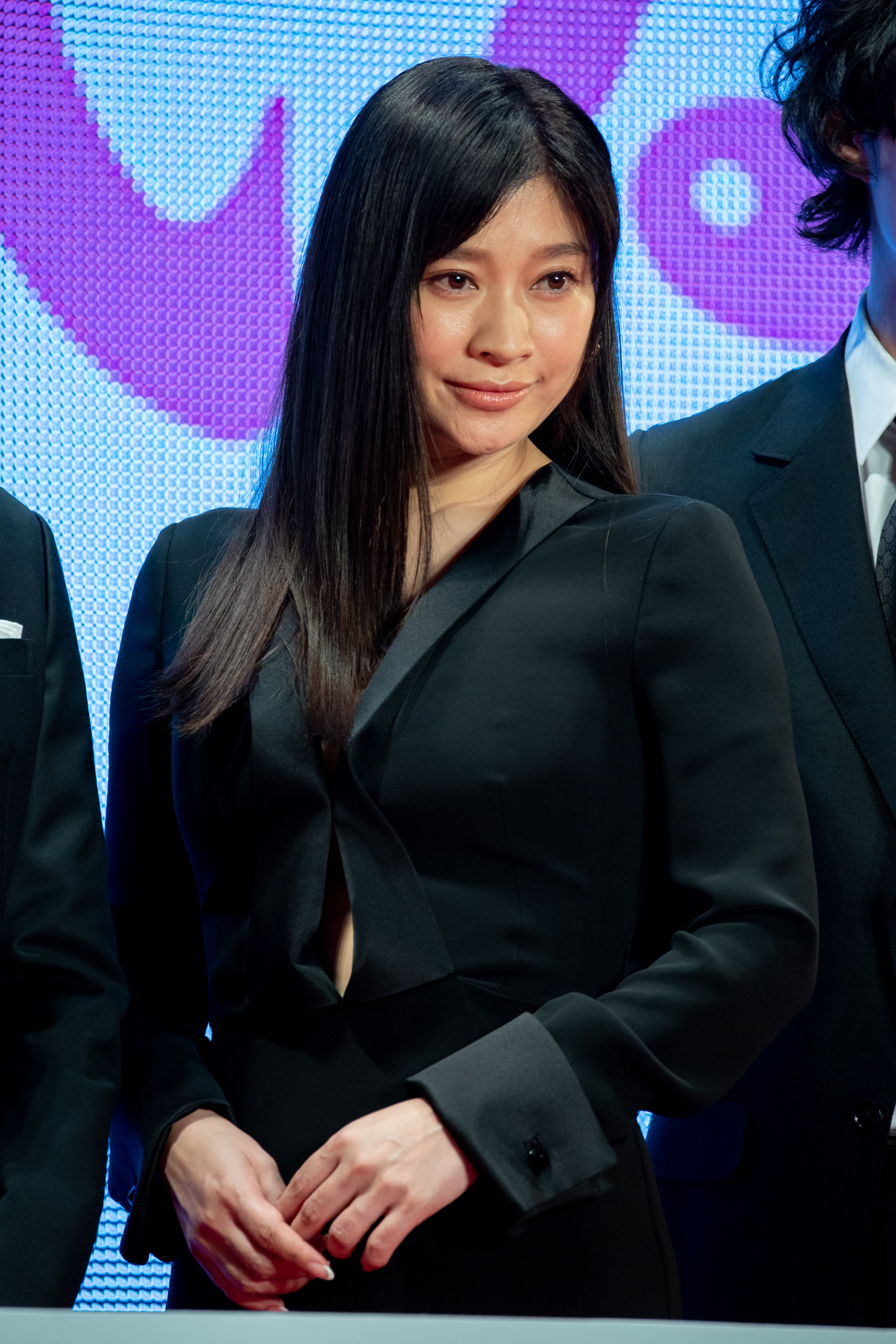
- Born: August 13, 1973 (age 52); Kiryū, Gunma, Japan
- Occupations: Actress and singer
- Years active: 1989–present
- Spouse: Masachika Ichimura (m. 2005; div. 2021)
- Children: 2

Ryoko Shinohara (篠原 涼子, Shinohara Ryōko; born August 13, 1973) is a Japanese singer and actress.

As a singer, she is best known for the 1994 song "Itoshisa to Setsunasa to Kokoro Zuyosa to" with producer Tetsuya Komuro, which charted at number one and made her the first female artist in Japan to record a double million in CD single sales. It was followed by the number one album Lady Generation: Shukujo no Jidai (1995). Shinohara's musical output saw waning commercial reception in the latter half of the decade, at which she began concentrating on her acting career.

Highlighted by the Japan Times for her "long reign as a TV drama queen", Shinohara's best known acting credits include detective Yukihira Natsumi in the drama series Unfair, which spawned three feature films and several specials; and temp worker Haruko Oomae in Haken no Hinkaku. She has starred in several acclaimed films, winning two Japan Academy Film Prizes for her roles in The House Where the Mermaid Sleeps and Sakura Guardian in the North, both in 2018.

== Career ==
Shinohara appeared in Tetsuya Nakashima's 2004 film Kamikaze Girls.

== Filmography ==
=== Films ===
- Shin Funky Monkey Teacher Dotsukaretarunen (1994)
- Funky Monkey Teacher Forever (1995)
- Happy People (1996)
- June Bride (1998)
- Beru Epokku (1998)
- Go-Con! Japanese Love Culture (2000)
- Red Shadow (2001)
- Calmi Cuori Appassionati (2001)
- Totunyuuseyo! Asama Sansou Jiken (2002)
- Dawn of a New Day: The Man Behind VHS (2002)
- Kendama (2002)
- Blessing Bell (2003)
- Kamikaze Girls (2004) as Momoko's mom.
- The Uchoten Hotel (2006)
- Unfair (2006) as Natsumi Yukihira
- Hanada Shōnen Shi (2006)
- Unfair: The Movie (2007) as Natsumi Yukihira
- Unfair 2: The Answer (2011) as Natsumi Yukihira
- One Piece Film: Z (2012) as Ain (voice)
- Unfair: The End (2015) as Natsumi Yukihira
- Sakura Guardian in the North (2018)
- Sunny: Our Hearts Beat Together (2018) as Nami Abe (adult)
- The House Where the Mermaid Sleeps (2018) as Kaoruko Harima
- Bento Harassment (2019) as Kaori Mochimaru
- Wedding High (2022) as Maho Nakagoshi

=== Television ===
- Houkago (1992)
- Sugao no Mama de (1992)
- Ninshin Desuyo 2 (1995)
- Kagayaku Toki no Naka de (1995)
- Rennai Zenya: Ichidodake no Koi 2 (1996)
- Pure (1996)
- Naniwa Kinyudo 2 (1996)
- Shinryounaikai Ryouko (1997)
- Gift (1997)
- Bayside Shakedown (1997)
- Ao no Jidai (1998)
- Nanisama (1998)
- Beach Boys Special (1998)
- Kira Kira Hikaru (1998)
- Kiken na Kankei (1999)
- Genroku Ryoran (1999)
- Kabachitare (2000)
- Tokimune Hojo (2000)
- Saotome Typhoon (2001)
- Mukodono! (2001)
- HR (2002)
- Hatsu Taiken (2002)
- Renai Hensachi (2002)
- Boku no Mahou Tsukai (2003)
- Mukodono (2003)
- Mother and Lover (2004)
- Hikari to Tomo ni (2004)
- At Home Dad (2004)
- Yankee Bokou ni Kaeru (2004)
- Naniwa Kinyudo 6 (2005)
- Anego (2005) as Naoko Noda
- Unfair SP (2006) as Natsumi Yukihira
- Message (2006)
- Hanayome wa Yakudoshi (2006)
- Unfair (2006) as Natsumi Yukihira
- Woman's Island (2006)
- The Pride of the Temp (2007)
- Hataraku Gon! (2009)
- Ogon no Buta (2010)
- Tsuki no Koibito (2010)
- Unfair Double Meaning ~ Yes or No? SP 2 (2013)
- Last Cinderella (2013)
- Lady Girls (2015) as Aki Nakahara
- The Pride of the Temp 2 (2020)
- Ochoyan (2020–21) as Shizu Okada
- Fishbowl Wives (2022)
- Silent (2022) as Ritsuko Sakura

=== Dubbing ===
- World War Z, Karin Lane (Mireille Enos)

== Discography ==
=== Albums ===
==== Studio albums ====
Title	Album details	Peak chart positions
Title	Album details	JPN Oricon
Ryoko from Tokyo Performance Doll	Released: 15 January 1993; Label: Cha-Dance; Formats: CD	63
Lady Generation	Released: 21 August 1995; Label: Sony; Formats: CD	1

==== Compilation albums ====
Title	Album details	Peak chart positions
Title	Album details	JPN Oricon
Sweets: Best of Ryoko Shinohara	Released: 1 November 1997; Label: Sony; Formats: CD	20

=== Singles ===
Year	Album	Chart positions (JP)	Label
1991	Koi wa Chanson (恋はシャンソン)	-	Cha-Dance
1992	Squall (スコール)	97	Cha-Dance
1994	Sincerely	61	Cha-Dance
1994	Itoshisa to Setsunasa to Kokoro Zuyosa to (恋しさと せつなさと 心強さと)	1	Cha-Dance
1995	Motto Motto... (もっと もっと…)	3	Sony
1995	Lady Generation	5	Sony
1995	Dame! (ダメ!)	20	Sony
1996	Heibon na Happy ja Monotarinai (平凡なハッピーじゃ物足りない)	19	Sony
1996	Shiawase wa Soba ni Aru (しあわせはそばにある)	27	Sony
1996	Party wo Nukedasou! (パーティーをぬけだそう!)	49	Sony
1997	Goodbye Baby	63	Sony
1998	Blow Up	-	Sony
1998	A Place in the Sun	-	Sony
2000	Rhythm to Rule (リズムとルール)	63	Toshiba Emi
2001	Someday Somewhere	-	Kitty Mme
2003	Time of Gold: with Junpei Shiina	-	Sony Music Associated
2023	Itoshisa to Setsunasa to Kokoro Zuyosa to (恋しさと せつなさと 心強さと) 2023	38	Avex Trax

=== Kōhaku Uta Gassen appearances ===
Year / Broadcast	Appearance	Song	Appearance order	Opponent
1994 (Heisei 6) / 45th	Debut	"Itoshisa to Setsunasa to Kokoro Zuyosa to"	2/25	Tokio
2022 (Reiwa 4) / 73rd	2	"Itoshisa to Setsunasa to Kokoro Zuyosa to 2023"	37/44	Yuzu

== Awards ==
Year	Award	Category	Nominated work(s)	Result
2018	43rd Hochi Film Award	Best Actress	The House Where the Mermaid Sleeps, Sunny: Our Hearts Beat Together	Won
2019	61st Blue Ribbon Awards	Best Actress	The House Where the Mermaid Sleeps, Sunny: Our Hearts Beat Together	Nominated
2019	42nd Japan Academy Prize	Best Actress	The House Where the Mermaid Sleeps	Nominated
2019	42nd Japan Academy Prize	Best Supporting Actress	Sakura Guardian in the North	Nominated
