= Marian Diamond (actress) =

English actress (1936–2026)

- Marian Diamond in Tightrope 1972
- Born: Marion Diamond; 17 December 1936; London, England
- Died: 5 January 2026 (aged 89); London, England
- Education: RADA
- Occupation: Actress
- Years active: 1958–2006
- Relatives: Gillian Diamond (sister)

Marion Diamond (17 December 1936 – 5 January 2026), better known by the stage name Marian Diamond, was an English actress. Known primarily for her voice roles, she worked for the BBC for many years. Diamond narrated several episodes of Jackanory, dealing mostly with C. S. Lewis books. She voiced the part of Galadriel in 1981 radio series The Lord of the Rings.

== Life and career ==
Diamond was born in London on 17 December 1936. She was the younger of the two daughters of George Diamond, a Polish Jew, and his wife Rosemary (née Reed) of Irish extraction. Gillian Diamond, her sister, was a casting director. She attended RADA, graduating in 1956.

She appeared in a number of films, including 80,000 Suspects (1963), Subterfuge (1968), and Goodbye Gemini (1970). On television she appeared in such series as Dixon of Dock Green, Danger Man, Brookside and The Armando Iannucci Shows. She also played in the drama Madame Bovary (2000), which was broadcast in two parts on 6 and 13 February in the United States on WGBH-TV, and on 10 and 11 April in the United Kingdom on BBC Two.

Diamond died at University College Hospital in London, on 5 January 2026, aged 89.

== Filmography ==
=== Film ===
Year	Title	Role	Notes
1963	80,000 Suspects	Sister Durrell	Uncredited role
1968	Subterfuge	Schoolteacher	
1970	Goodbye Gemini	Denise Pryce-Fletcher	
1992	Tale of a Vampire	Denise	

=== Television ===
Year	Title	Role	Notes
1958	Armchair Theatre	Teenage Girl	Episode: "Paid in Full"
1959	The Young Lady from London	(unknown)	Mini-series; episode 2
1960	Dixon of Dock Green	Jean Taylor	Episode: "The Guilty Party"
1960	Noah	Ada	Television film
1960	Scotland Yard	(unknown)	Episode: "Special Duty"
1960	Danger Man	Telephone Operator	Episode: "The Girl in Pink Pajamas". Uncredited role
1961	A Life of Bliss	Janet Markham	Episode: #2.2
1961	ITV Television Playhouse	Renate	Episode: "Marking Time"
1963	Emergency Ward 10	Pauline Roberts	3 episodes
1963	First Night	Simone de Mateos	Episode: "The Dawn"
1964	The Avengers	Jessy	Episode: "Build a Better Mousetrap"
1964	Dig This Rhubarb	(unknown)	5 episodes
1964	Detective	Julia Stoner	Episode: "The Speckled Band". Pilot for the series Sherlock Holmes
1964	Love Story	Angela	Episode: "I Love, You Love, We Love"
1964–1967	Play School	Herself - Presenter	60 episodes
1965	Jackanory	Dancer	Episode: "Cap of Rushes"
1965	Front Page Story	Dina	Episode: "Runaways"
1965	Z-Cars	Ava Ludd	Episode: "Give a Dog a Name"
1965	ITV Sunday Night Drama	Ann Fleming	Episode: "Lot 171"
1965	The Sullavan Brothers	Julie Roman	Episode: "The Corrupters"
1965	Fothergale Co. Ltd.	Sylvia Masters	2 episodes: "Raw Material Prices" and "Advertising"
1965	Londoners	Gillian	Episode: "Kill Three"
1965	ITV Play of the Week	Jean Sansome	Episode: "Their Obedient Servants"
1965	The Mask of Janus	Tina Verrill	Episode: "The Cold Equation"
1966	The Idiot	Alexandra	Mini-series; 5 episodes
1966	Mystery and Imagination	Alice Simpson	Episode: "The Tractate Middoth"
1966	The Troubleshooters	Anna Kenny	Episode: "The Fires of Hell"
1966	Play of the Month	Jean Bell	Episode: "The Devil's Eggshell"
1967	Sir Arthur Conan Doyle	Miss Mary Bradshaw	Episode: "The New Catacomb"
1967	The Paradise Makers	Jean	3 episodes
1967, 1968	Jackanory	Herself - Storyteller	10 episodes: "The Lion, the Witch and the Wardrobe" and "Prince Caspian"
1968	ITV Playhouse	Mary Ann	Episode: "Rogue's Gallery: The Curious Adventures of Miss Jane Rawley"
1968	ITV Playhouse	Maggie Brown	Episode: "A Matter of Diamonds"
1968	Detective	Ethel Le Neve	Episode: "Crime of Passion"
1968	Market in Honey Lane	Ann Markham	Episode: #3.14
1969	Canterbury Tales	Prioress	5 episodes
1970	The Main Chance	Henrietta Carson	Episode: "The Best Legal System in the World"
1971	Crime of Passion	Roberta	Episode: "Olivier"
1971	Kate	Beth Randall	2 episodes: "Call Her Sensitive" and "Call Her Serious"
1971	Owen, M.D.	Elaine Norton	2 episodes: "The Town Mouse: Parts 1 & 2"
1972	Tightrope	Miss Jane Walker	12 episodes
1972	A Place in the Sun	Pamela Lenton	Mini-series; episode: "Achilles Heel"
1972	Spy Trap	Helen Foster	4 episodes: "The Executioner: Parts 1–4"
1974	Thriller	Jennifer Peel	Episode: "The Next Scream You Hear"
1974	The Little Mermaid	First Sister	Television film
1976	Warship	Surgeon Lt. Sue Herrick	3 episodes
1977	Rough Justice	Frances Penrose	Mini-series; 4 episodes
1979	Bothwell	Anna Throndsen	Television film
1980	Company and Co.	Furrier's Assistant	Episode: "The First Touch"
1980	The Swish of the Curtain	Mrs. Halford	4 episodes
1982	Jackanory Playhouse	Running Deer	Episode: "Hawkwing"
1985	The Secret Diary of Adrian Mole, Aged 13¾	Mrs. Claricoates	Episode: #1.2
1987	The Growing Pains of Adrian Mole	Mrs. Claricoates	2 episodes
1992–1995	Brookside	Mrs. Shackleton	14 episodes
1993	Between the Lines	Secretary	Episode: "Some Must Watch"
1996	The Ruth Rendell Mysteries	Dr. Jamieson	Episode: "Heartstones: Part Two"
2000	Madame Bovary	Sister Marie Paul	2-part television film
2001	The Armando Iannucci Shows	Various	5 episodes
2006	Doctors	Jean Franks	Episode: "One Day, Maybe"
