= Eko Eko Azarak: Wizard of Darkness =

- Film poster
- Directed by: Shimako Sato
- Screenplay by: Junki Takegami
- Story by: Shinichi Koga
- Based on: Eko Eko Azarak by Shinichi Koga
- Produced by: Yoshinori Chiba; Shun'ichi Kobayashi
- Starring: Kimika Yoshino; Miho Kanno; Miho Tamura; Kanori Kadomatsu
- Cinematography: Shoei Sudo
- Edited by: Hiroshi Kawahara
- Music by: Mikiya Katakura
- Production companies: Gaga Communications; Tsuburaya Eizo Co.
- Release date: April 8, 1995 (Japan)
- Running time: 82 minutes
- Country: Japan
- Language: Japanese

Eko Eko Azarak: Wizard of Darkness (Japanese: エコエコアザラク -WIZARD OF DARKNESS-) is a 1995 Japanese horror film directed by Shimako Sato. The film is based on the manga Eko Eko Azarak, and stars Kimika Yoshino as a transfer student to a new school, who is secretly a witch travelling from school to school in order to dispel the work of the devil.

The film was shown at the Toronto International Film Festival in 1995. The film was followed by two sequels, starting with Eko Eko Azarak II: Birth of the Wizard in 1996.

== Plot ==
A mysterious cabal of red-garbed magicians have been murdering inhabitants of an unnamed Japanese city. Their latest victim is a woman who is decapitated while the magicians perform a ritual with a voodoo doll. The object of the murders to provide the five geographical points of a giant pentagram, with a high school in the nexus. The magicians' ultimate aim is to summon Lucifer himself.

Misa Kuroi, a transfer student at the school, is a witch of considerable power and has come to battle the evil magicians. However, Misa has some difficulty getting classmates to trust her.

== Cast ==
- Kimika Yoshino as Misa Kuroi
- Miho Kanno as Mizuki Kurohashi
- Miho Tamura as Maki Yoshida
- Kanori Kadomatsu as Kazzumi Tanaka

== Production ==
Shimako Sato, the director of Eko Eko Azarak: Wizard of Darkness, had previously filmed Tale of a Vampire (1992) in the United Kingdom. She returned to Japan with the desire to make a film about witchcraft and magic. She recalled the manga series Eko Eko Azarak from the 1970s, and began adapting it for cinema.

The film was shot in two weeks, and featured the cinematic debut of Kimika Yoshino. Yoshino received her script a day before shooting had started and before she had even met the director.

== Release ==
Eko Eko Azarak: Wizard of Darkness was released in Japan on April 8, 1995. It was shown at the Toronto Film Festival in September 1995. The film was adapted into a video game also titled Eko Eko Azarak: Wizard of Darkness for PlayStation. It was released on December 29, 1995.

A DVD of the film was released by Tokyo Shock on December 16, 2003. The disc included footage of the films premiere, the trailer, and interviews with the director and Kimika Yoshino.

== Reception ==
Variety gave the film a positive review, referring to it as "high-octane, modestly produced occult thriller is top-notch genre fare", and that "obviously plowing a familiar celluloid field, director/co-writer Sato demonstrates not only a visual flair for the genre, but a wicked sense of humor that deftly counterbalances the per force conventions of this type of story."

The film won the Minami Toshiko Award at the 1995 Yubari International Fantastic Film Festival. It was also selected for the official competition for best film at the 1997 Fantasporto.

== Aftermath ==
Shimako Sato returned to the direct the follow-up film Eko Eko Azarak II: Birth of the Wizard (1996).

== Notes ==
=== References ===
- Kalat, David (2007). J-horror: The Definitive Guide to The Ring, The Grudge and Beyond. Vertical. ISBN 978-1932234084.
- Klady, Leonard (October 23, 1995). "Review: 'Wizard of Darkness'". Variety. Archived from the original on December 15, 2024.
- Sharp, Jasper (2011). Historical Dictionary of Japanese Cinema. Scarecrow Press. ISBN 978-0810875418.
- Tsūshin, Hamamura; Hada, Takayuki; Watanabe, Miki; Uchisawa, Goro (January 5, 1996). "New Games Cross Review". Weekly Famitsu (in Japanese). No. 368. ASCII Corporation.
- "Eko Eko Azarak: Wizard of Darkness (1995)". AllMovie. Archived from the original on August 31, 2019.
- ""Bound" and "Unhook the Stars": Winners of the two competitive sections Of Fantasporto'97". Fantasporto. Archived from the original on August 1, 1997.
- "Yubari International Fantastic Film Festival Archive". yubarifanta.com. Archived from the original on 2011-07-18.
