= Kimika Yoshino =

Japanese actress and gravure idol (born 1975)

- Born: September 5, 1975 (age 51); Odawara, Kanagawa, Japan
- Occupations: Actress, gravure idol
- Years active: 1992 - present

Kimika Yoshino (吉野公佳, Yoshino Kimika) is a Japanese actress and gravure idol.

== Life and career ==
Yoshino was born on September 5, 1975, in Kanagawa, Japan. She started out as a gravure idol in 1994 in a swimsuit campaign for Toyobo and in the same year she was also chosen as one of the Fuji Television Visual Queens. She made her film debut as a nineteen-year-old starring in the role of schoolgirl Misa Kuroi in the manga-based live action movie Eko Eko Azarak: Wizard of Darkness, released in April 1995. Her work in this film brought her the award for Best Newcomer at the fifth Japanese Professional Movie Awards. The next year, she reprised her role in the sequel Eko Eko Azarak 2: Birth of the Wizard. Also in 1996, she appeared in the fantasy film Acri: The Legend of Homo-Aquarellius, directed by singer-songwriter Tatsuya Ishii.

In September 1997 she had a feature role in OL Chu-Singura, a comedy about women office workers fighting against an evil corporation, and in 1998, she appeared as the heroine in the black comedy Unlucky Monkey directed by Sabu. Yoshino continued to appear in films, TV shows and V-cinema productions in the early 2000s. In the TV Tokyo series Hanbun no Tsuki ga Noboru Sora, a live action TV drama based on a series of novels which aired in October to December, 2006, she played the role of the nurse Akiko Tanizaki.

In August 2008, the adult video (AV) firm Muteki announced that Yoshino would be the star of their second video production (the first starred actress Mio Saegusa). According to reports, Yoshino was to be paid about 20 to 25 million yen (about US$170,000 to 200,000) and it was considered that the video might sell as many as 100,000 copies. The video, Impact Kimika Yoshino (インパクト 吉野公佳), released by Muteki in October 2008, was an "adult image" video which did not contain any hardcore sex.

Yoshino returned to mainstream film in 2010 with a role in the horror film Kyofu. In 2011, she starred in the title role for the TBS version of the manga classic Lady Snowblood which was broadcast on March 27, 2011.

== Filmography ==
- Eko Eko Azarak: Wizard of Darkness (1995)
- Eko Eko Azarak 2: Birth of the Wizard (1996)
- Acri: The Legend of Homo-Aquarellius (1996)
- OL Chu-Singura (OL忠臣蔵 Chu～Shin Gura) (1997)
- Unlucky Monkey (アンラッキー・モンキー) (1998)
- Part-Time Detective (2002) as Mari Tomishiro a.k.a. "Kotori"
- Gozu (2003)
- Garo (2005, TV series)
- Hanbun no Tsuki ga Noboru Sora (2006, TV series)
- Waru (2006)
- Kyofu (2010)
