= Tsuki no Koibito =

- poster
- Genre: Drama
- Created by: Shũsuke Michio
- Written by: Taeko Asano
- Directed by: Hiroshi Nishitani, Shin Hirano, Yusuke Ishii
- Starring: Takuya Kimura; Ryoko Shinohara; Shota Matsuda; Lin Chi-ling; Keiko Kitagawa
- Theme music composer: Toshinobu Kubota
- Composer: Yũ Takami
- Country of origin: Japan
- Original language: Japanese
- No. of seasons: 1
- No. of episodes: 8

Production
- Producers: Hiroyuki Goto, Ken Murase
- Camera setup: Multi-camera
- Running time: 54 minutes Ep. 1: 15-minute extension Ep. 7: 10-minute extension Ep. 8: 69-minute extension
- Production companies: Fuji TV; Kyodo TV

Original release
- Network: Fuji TV
- Release: May 10 – July 5, 2010

Tsuki no Koibito ~Moon Lovers~ (月の恋人〜Moon Lovers〜) is a Japanese television drama starting on Fuji TV on 10 May 2010. The drama is known also under the Japanese short name Getsukoi (ゲツコイ).

== Synopsis ==
Hazuki Rensuke (Kimura Takuya), the president of Regolith, a luxury furniture company, is determined to increase his company's market share in the house furnishing business.

== Cast ==
- Kimura Takuya as Hazuki Rensuke
- Shinohara Ryoko as Ninomiya Maemi
- Lin Chi-ling as Liu Xiu Mei
- Matsuda Shota as Sai Kazami/Cai Feng Jian
- Kitagawa Keiko as Onuki Yuzuki
- Watanabe Ikkei as Kijihata Togo
- Hamada Gaku as Maehara Tsuguo
- Mikami Kensei as Koizumi Keiichi
- Nishiyama Maki as Eruka
- Mitsushima Hikari as Anzai Rina
- Nakamura Yuri as Kasahara Yuki
- Tsuyoshi Abe as Min
- Nagatsuka Kyozo as Onuki Shogen
- Nukumizu Youichi as Tokita Ikuzo
- Takenaka Naoto as Maruyama Tetsuji
- Kabira Jay as Mineoka Yasuyuki

== Ratings ==
	Episode title	Romanized title	Translation of title	Broadcast date	Ratings
Ep 1	おまえが欲しい	Omae ga hosii	I want you	May 10, 2010	22.4%
Ep 2	ありえないキス	"Arienai kisu"	The unthinkable kiss	May 17, 2010	19.2%
Ep 3	復讐のプロポーズ	"Fukusyū no puropōzu"	The proposal out of revenge	May 24, 2010	15.6%
Ep 4	こんなに好きだったんだ…	"Konna ni suki dattanda…"	That's how much I liked you...	May 31, 2010	15.5%
Ep 5	好きと言えたらいいのに	"Suki to ietara iinoni"	If only I could say, I like you	June 7, 2010	17.4%
Ep 6	最終章序幕・別れ	"Saishūshōjomaku.wakare"	A prologue of final chapter, farewell	June 14, 2010	13.4%
Ep 7	二人だけの同窓会	Futaridake no dōsōkai	A class reunion for two of us	June 28, 2010	14.4%
Ep 8	さよなら葉月蓮介! 3人の女性へ贈るラストメッセージ! 究極のラブストーリーが迎える衝撃の結末! 涙、涙のエンディングへ…	"Sayonara Hazuki Rensuke!... 3-Ri no josei e okuru rasutomessēji! Kyūkyoku no rabusutōrī ga mukaeru shōgeki no ketsumatsu! Namida, namida no endingu e…"	Good-bye, Rensuke Hazuki!Last message for three women! A ballistic ending for an ultimate love story! Heading for an ending with tears...	July 5, 2010	16.2%
Ratings for the Kanto region (Average rating: 16.8%)
