= Unfair: The Movie =

- Film poster
- アンフェア the movie
- Directed by: Yoshinori Kobayashi
- Screenplay by: Shimako Satō
- Based on: Suiri Shōsetsu by Takehiko Hata
- Starring: Ryoko Shinohara
- Music by: Norihito Sumitomo
- Production company: Kyodo Television
- Distributed by: Toho
- Release date: March 17, 2007 (Japan)
- Running time: 112 minutes
- Country: Japan
- Language: Japanese

Unfair: The Movie (Japanese: アンフェア the movie) is a 2007 Japanese action film directed by Yoshinori Kobayashi, a follow up to the Japanese television drama Unfair, with Ryoko Shinohara starring again in the main role. It is a Die Hard-esque movie in which the heroine, a police officer, must free her daughter trapped in a hospital taken by terrorists asking for a ransom. It was released on March 17, 2007 and followed by Unfair 2: The Answer in 2011 and Unfair: The End in 2015.

== Cast ==
- Ryoko Shinohara – Natsumi Yukihira
- Kippei Shiina – Kuniaki Goto
- Hiroki Narimiya – Toda
- Sadao Abe – Yuji Kokubo
- Mari Hamada – Anna Hasumi
- Rosa Kato – Hiroko
- Mion Mukaichi – Mio
- Masaya Kato – Kaoru Mikami
- Ren Osugi – Assistant Director Irie
- Susumu Terajima – Tetsuo Yamazaki
- Yosuke Eguchi – Jin Saiki
