= Tale of a Vampire =

1992 film directed by Shimako Sato

- Film poster
- Directed by: Shimako Satō
- Screenplay by: Shimako Satō; Jane Corbett
- Story by: Shimako Satō
- Produced by: Simon Johnson
- Starring: Julian Sands; Suzanna Hamilton; Kenneth Cranham
- Cinematography: Zubin Mistry
- Edited by: Chris Wright
- Music by: Julian Joseph
- Production companies: State Screen Productions; Tsuburaya Ezio Ltd; Furama Ltd
- Distributed by: State Screen Distribution
- Release date: November 20, 1992 (United Kingdom)
- Running time: 102 minutes
- Countries: United Kingdom; Japan
- Language: English
- Budget: £250,000
- Box office: £30,000 (UK)

Tale of a Vampire is a 1992 independent horror film directed by Shimako Satō and starring Julian Sands, Suzanna Hamilton, and Kenneth Cranham. It is loosely based on "Annabel Lee", the poem by Edgar Allan Poe.

== Plot ==
Alex is a vampire living in modern-day London, haunted by the memory of his lost love, Virginia, who died centuries ago. He becomes infatuated with Anne, who bears a striking resemblance to Virginia. Despite sensing something odd about Alex and still grieving the death of her boyfriend, Anne is drawn to him. A mysterious stranger warns Anne that Alex is a vampire, but she becomes more fascinated rather than frightened.

Anne visits Alex's home intending to kill him, but instead asks him to turn her into a vampire. Alex refuses, and Anne disappears. Alex later finds Anne's body on his bed, wrapped in red ribbon. The mysterious stranger reveals himself to be Edgar, Virginia's husband and also a vampire. Edgar admits to killing Anne and reveals that he has imprisoned Virginia in a lead box beneath the sea. Edgar then impales Alex with a sword.

== Cast ==
- Julian Sands as Alex
- Suzanna Hamilton as Anne/Virginia
- Kenneth Cranham as Edgar, The Man in the Hat
- Marian Diamond as Denise
- Michael Kenton as Magazine Man
- Catherine Blake as Virginia, age 5

== Reception ==
Mark Kermode, reviewing the film in Sight and Sound, called it "a flawed but impressive debut from a talent which deserves to be nurtured". He commented: "this twisted tale uses sparse, understated dialogue to evoke a genuine sense of grief and loss absent from mainstream fodder." Kermode also praised the "strong performances" by Julian Sands and Kenneth Cranham but described Suzanna Hamilton as miscast and "resolutely unenigmatic".

Writing in Variety, Derek Elley praised Sato's "keen designer's eye" but found the film hampered by a poor script and poor performances: "Sands and Hamilton make a bloodless couple, with little hint of all-consuming passion and almost no hint of acting ability. Cranham is fine within the script's limitations and with a larger part would have stolen the movie."

A later assessment in Fangoria concludes that "Satō’s debut feature remains an intriguing slice of retro gothic camp". Reviewer Alexandra Heller-Nicholas also notes: "The film thus is dripping with a range of internal tensions that manifest within the film itself in really curious, captivating ways: it is both a vision of then-contemporary London seen through the eyes of a Japanese filmmaker, and simultaneously a film about a sexually disturbed man told through the eyes of a woman filmmaker."
