= Mari Hamada (actress) =

Japanese singer and actress (born 1968)

- 濱田マリ
- Born: December 27, 1968 (age 57); Kobe, Hyogo, Japan
- Occupations: Actress, singer
- Years active: 1998–present

Mari Hamada (濱田マリ, Hamada Mari; born December 27, 1968) is a Japanese singer and actress who starred in numerous Japanese films and Japanese television dramas. and released two solo albums and solo singles in the 1990s, after being part of the Japanese band "Modern Choki Chokies". She was also part of the Japanese "unit" (temporary band) "Unknown Soup & Spice" in 2003.

== Discography ==
=== Solo albums ===
- Futsu no hito (フツーの人) (1995)
- Amu Onna (編む女) (1997) which includes a title with Autechre

=== Solo singles ===
- パジャマトリッパー
- フツーで行こう
- ひとひと
- 人の息子
- It's My Love/氣愛/Sens

=== Band albums ===
With "Modern Choki Chokies":

- Rolling dodoitsu (ローリング・ドドイツ) (1992)
- Bongengan Bangara Bingen no Densetsu (ボンゲンガンバンガラビンゲンの伝説 (1993)
- Moda-Choki (別冊モダチョキ臨時増刊号) (1994)
- Kumachan (くまちゃん) (1994)
- Readymade no Modern Choki Chokies (レディメイドのモダンチョキチョキズ) (1997)

With "Unknown Soup & Spice":

- Chant (2003)

== Filmography ==
=== Film ===
- Shomuni (1998)
- The Cat Returns (2002)
- Blood and Bones (2004)
- Kiraware Matsuko no Issho (2006)
- Hanada Shonen-shi (2006)
- Sakai-ke no Shiawase (2006)
- The Battery (2007)
- Unfair: The Movie (2007)
- Cafe Isobe (2008)
- Her Granddaughter (2014)
- Maestro! (2015)
- 14 That Night (2016)
- The Projects (2016), Nishi
- Traces of Sin (2017)
- Inuyashiki (2018)
- After the Rain (2018), Kayoko Kubo
- Real Girl (2018)
- Little Nights, Little Love (2018)
- Oz Land (2018)
- Tora-san, Wish You Were Here (2019)
- Little Nights, Little Love (2019)
- The Confidence Man JP: Episode of the Princess (2020)
- Project Dream: How to Build Mazinger Z's Hangar (2020)
- Between Us (2021)
- Musicophilia (2021)
- The End of the Pale Hour (2022)
- Maru (2024)
- Oshi no Ko: The Final Act (2024)
- Traveling Alone (2025)
- Climbing for Life (2025)
- One Year to Live, Buy a Man (2026), Sena's mother

=== Dramas and TV-movies ===
- Koi no Bakansu (NTV, 1997)
- Love Again (TBS, 1998)
- Oatsui no ga Osuki? (NTV, 1998)
- Yoiko no Mikata (NTV, 2003)
- Diamond Girl (Fuji TV, 2003)
- Shin Yonigeya Honpo (NTV, 2003, ep1)
- Kikujiro to Saki (TV Asahi, 2003)
- Ranpo R Kyuketsuki (NTV, 2004)
- Sore wa, Totsuzen, Arashi no you ni... (TBS, 2004)
- Wonderful Life (Fuji TV, 2004)
- Shin Yonigeya Honpo (NTV, 2003, ep1)
- Kikujiro to Saki 2 (TV Asahi, 2005)
- Kiken na Aneki (Fuji TV, 2005)
- Tsubasa No Oreta Tenshitachi (Fuji TV, 2005, ep4)
- Unfair (Fuji TV, 2006)
- Dance Drill (Fuji TV, 2006)
- Unfair SP (Fuji TV, 2006)
- Yakusha Damashii (Fuji TV, 2006)
- Kirakira Kenshui (TBS, 2007)
- Erai Tokoro ni Totsuide Shimatta! (TV Asahi, 2007)
- Kodoku no Kake (TBS, 2007)
- Ushi ni Negai wo: Love & Farm (Fuji TV, 2007)
- Kikujiro to Saki 3 (TV Asahi, 2007)
- SAITOU san (2008)
- Camouflage Chapter 4: Tomin Suzuko (2008)
- Piple (2020)
- Come Come Everybody (2021–22), Kazuko Takemura
- Takahashi from the Bike Shop (TV Tokyo, 2022), Satoko Hanno
- Saionji-san wa Kaji o Shinai (2024), Chisako Satou
- Oshi no Ko (2024), Eriko Kawamura
- Omusubi (2025), Fumika Tsukamoto
