= Modern Choki Chokies =

Japanese pop band

- Origin: Japan
- Genres: Pop
- Years active: 1992-1997
- Labels: Trefort, Ki/oon
- Past members: Mari Hamada, Kawamura Koji, Osamu Isoda, Yasuhiro Yoshigaki

Modern Choki Chokies (モダンチョキチョキズ) were a Japanese pop band from the early 1990s. The main singer was future soloist and actress Mari Hamada (濱田マリ), not to be confused with homonym singer Mari Hamada (浜田麻里). Their greatest hits compilation, Readymade Recordings, was curated by Yasuharu Konishi of Pizzicato Five.

== Albums ==
- Rolling Dodoitsu - (ローリング・ドドイツ) - (1992)
- The Legend Of Bongengan Bangara Bingen - (ボンゲンガンバンガラビンゲンの伝説) - (1993)
- The Extra Number of Moda-Choki - (別冊モダチョキ臨時増刊号) - (1994)
- Kumachan - (くまちゃん) - (1994)
- Readymade no Modern Choki Chokies - (レディメイドのモダンチョキチョキズ) - (best of) - (1997)
