= The Treasure Hunter =

2009 Taiwanese action film

- Official poster for The Treasure Hunter
- Directed by: Kevin Chu
- Written by: Charcoal Tan; Yip Wan-chiu; Lam Chiu-wing; Lam Ching-yan; Shao Huiting
- Produced by: Han Sanping; Han Xiaoli; Jiang Tai; Raymond Lee; Pei Gin-yam; Du Yang; Ding Li; Dong Zhengrong; Han Xiao
- Starring: Jay Chou; Lin Chi-ling; Eric Tsang; Chen Daoming; Baron Chen; Will Liu; Miao Pu
- Cinematography: Zhao Xiaoding
- Edited by: Chen Bowen
- Music by: Ricky Ho
- Production companies: Chang Hong Channel Film & Video Co.
- Distributed by: Chang Hong Channel Film & Video Co.
- Release date: 9 December 2009
- Running time: 105 minutes
- Countries: China; Taiwan; Hong Kong
- Languages: Mandarin; Cantonese
- Budget: NT$500 million
- Box office: NT$363 million

The Treasure Hunter (Chinese: 刺陵; pinyin: Cì líng) is a 2009 Taiwanese action film directed by Kevin Chu and starring Jay Chou and Lin Chi-ling, while Ching Siu-tung served as action director.

== Plot ==
In the northwest desert where countless prosperous dynasties have flourished and fallen, there is a rumor that buried amongst the sand exists a tomb containing countless riches. A group of mysterious guardians have been guarding the map to the location of the treasure until a fierce rivalry erupts. A notorious international crime group, The company, manage to hunt down the map keeper but not before he manages to pass the map to a young chivalrous man, Qiao Fei (Jay Chou).

Qiao Fei is forced to give up the map to save the life of his mentor's daughter Lan Ting (Lin Chi-ling). Teaming up with Hua Ding-bang (Chen Daoming), who is a famous archeologist, and Lan Ting they embark on a dangerous journey to recover the map and fight to protect the ancient treasure.

== Cast ==
- Jay Chou as Qiao Fei 喬飛
- Lin Chi-ling as Lan Ting 藍婷
  - Guan Xiaotong as young Lan Ting
- Eric Tsang as Pork Rib 排骨
- Chen Daoming as Master Hua Ding-bang 華爺（華定邦）
- Baron Chen as Desert Eagle 大漠飛鷹
- Will Liu as Friday 星期五
- Miao Pu as Swords Thirteen 刀刀（刀十三郎）
- Kenneth Tsang as Tu Lao-dai

== Critical response ==
The film was generally panned by critics.

According to Perry Lam of Muse Magazine, "Chou plays his role with a mix of nonchalance and self-righteousness which is simply irritating. He fits perfectly into a movie that, though trying hard to be escapist entertainment, often approaches its material with utmost solemnity; anything resembling a laugh, let alone fun, is taken out."
