= List of 2011 box office number-one films in Japan =

This is a list of films which have placed number one at the weekend box office in Japan during 2011.

== Number-one films ==
†	This implies the highest-grossing movie of the year.

#	Date	Film	Gross	Notes
1	January 9, 2011	Gantz	$14,788,986	
2	January 16, 2011	Gantz	$18,462,208	
3	January 23, 2011	The Social Network	$13,015,217	
4	January 30, 2011	The Social Network	$12,550,966	
5	February 6, 2011	Unstoppable	$2,747,653	
6	February 13, 2011	Gantz	$16,668,765	
7	February 20, 2011	Hereafter	$31,111,742	
8	February 27, 2011	The Chronicles of Narnia: The Voyage of the Dawn Treader	$16,693,133	
9	March 6, 2011	Doraemon: Nobita and the New Steel Troops—Winged Angels	$20,399,714	
10	March 13, 2011	SP: The Motion Picture II	$12,256,453	
11	March 20, 2011	SP: The Motion Picture II	$17,320,450	
12	March 27, 2011	SP: The Motion Picture II	$17,124,995	
13	April 3, 2011	OOO, Den-O, All Riders: Let's Go Kamen Riders	$18,197,301	
14	April 10, 2011	OOO, Den-O, All Riders: Let's Go Kamen Riders	$12,344,643	
15	April 17, 2011	Detective Conan: Quarter of Silence	$19,230,726	
16	April 24, 2011	Gantz: Perfect Answer	$20,290,149	
17	May 1, 2011	Detective Conan: Quarter of Silence	$20,290,149	
18	May 8, 2011	Gaku: Minna no Yama	$13,843,743	
19	May 15, 2011	Black Swan	$13,000,858	
20	May 22, 2011	Pirates of the Caribbean: On Stranger Tides	$27,081,618	
21	May 29, 2011	Pirates of the Caribbean: On Stranger Tides	$23,240,411	
22	June 5, 2011	Pirates of the Caribbean: On Stranger Tides	$21,244,530	
23	June 12, 2011	Pirates of the Caribbean: On Stranger Tides	$26,244,971	
24	June 19, 2011	Pirates of the Caribbean: On Stranger Tides	$19,254,560	
25	June 26, 2011	Pirates of the Caribbean: On Stranger Tides	$18,724,720	
26	July 3, 2011	Super 8	$15,929,725	
27	July 10, 2011	Pirates of the Caribbean: On Stranger Tides	$11,980,622	
28	July 17, 2011	Harry Potter and the Deathly Hallows – Part 2 †	$26,681,963	
29	July 24, 2011	Harry Potter and the Deathly Hallows – Part 2 †	$20,394,041	
30	July 31, 2011	Transformers: Dark of the Moon	$30,266,577	
31	August 7, 2011	Transformers: Dark of the Moon	$26,237,614	
32	August 14, 2011	Harry Potter and the Deathly Hallows – Part 2 †	$27,278,499	
33	August 21, 2011	Harry Potter and the Deathly Hallows – Part 2 †	$25,687,868	
34	August 28, 2011	In His Chart	$18,796,358	
35	September 4, 2011	One Life	$15,694,489	
36	September 11, 2011	Detective in the Bar	$12,849,843	
37	September 18, 2011	Unfair 2: The Answer	$17,098,154	
38	September 25, 2011	Moteki	$14,129,696	
39	October 2, 2011	Fast Five	$20,319,711	
40	October 9, 2011	Rise of the Planet of the Apes	$17,281,604	
41	October 16, 2011	Rise of the Planet of the Apes	$12,907,568	
42	October 23, 2011	Rise of the Planet of the Apes	$12,555,848	
43	October 30, 2011	A Ghost of a Chance	$19,030,166	
44	November 6, 2011	A Ghost of a Chance	$19,190,741	
45	November 13, 2011	A Ghost of a Chance	$15,430,084	
46	November 20, 2011	A Ghost of a Chance	$13,068,848	
47	November 27, 2011	Eiga Kaibutsukun	$15,940,384	
48	December 4, 2011	Eiga Kaibutsukun	$19,008,853	
49	December 11, 2011	Kamen Rider × Kamen Rider Fourze & OOO: Movie War Mega Max	$21,550,334	
50	December 18, 2011	Mission: Impossible – Ghost Protocol	$21,728,656	
51	December 25, 2011	Mission: Impossible – Ghost Protocol	$22,484,033	
52	December 31, 2012	Mission: Impossible – Ghost Protocol	$13,863,716	

^{A} "Japanese Weekend Box Office Index, 2010". Box Office Mojo. Box Office Mojo, LLC. Note: Click on the relevant weekend to view specifics.

== Highest-grossing films ==
International film Japanese film

Highest-grossing films of 2011
Rank	Title	Gross
1	Harry Potter and the Deathly Hallows – Part 2	¥9.67 billion ($121.17 million)
2	Pirates of the Caribbean: On Stranger Tides	¥8.87 billion ($111.14 million)
3	Harry Potter and the Deathly Hallows – Part 1	¥6.86 billion ($85.96 million)
4	From Up on Poppy Hill	¥4.46 billion ($55.88 million)
5	Pokémon the Movie: Black—Victini and Reshiram and White—Victini and Zekrom	¥4.33 billion ($54.26 million)
6	A Ghost of a Chance	¥4.28 billion ($53.63 million)
7	Transformers: Dark of the Moon	¥4.25 billion ($53.25 million)
8	Space Battleship Yamato	¥4.10 billion ($51.37 million)
9	Gantz	¥3.45 billion ($43.23 million)
10	SP: The Motion Picture II	¥3.33 billion ($41.73 million)

== See also ==
- List of Japanese films of 2011
