= Subterfuge (1968 film) =

1968 British film by Peter Graham Scott

- Directed by: Peter Graham Scott
- Written by: David Whitaker
- Produced by: Peter Snell; Trevor Wallace
- Starring: Gene Barry; Joan Collins; Richard Todd
- Cinematography: Roy Garner
- Edited by: Bill Lewthwaite
- Music by: Cyril Ornadel
- Production companies: Commonwealth United Entertainment; Intertel
- Distributed by: Rank Film Distributors (UK)
- Release date: December 1968 (UK)
- Running time: 89 minutes
- Country: United Kingdom
- Language: English

Subterfuge is a 1968 British Eurospy espionage film directed by Peter Graham Scott and starring Gene Barry, Joan Collins and Richard Todd. It was written by David Whitaker.

== Synopsis ==
A young wife is becoming very distraught over the fact that her husband, a secret service "spy" for Britain, has changed his mind about transferring away so that he can spend more time with her and their young son. He has grown cold and distant towards her; she thinks it's because of the secretiveness of his work. Meanwhile, a U.S spy comes to Britain and is induced to help the British "team" with an undercover spy ring.

== Cast ==
- Gene Barry as Michael A. Donovan
- Joan Collins as Anne Langley
- Richard Todd as Colonel Victor Redmayne
- Tom Adams as Peter Langley
- Suzanna Leigh as Donetta
- Michael Rennie as Goldsmith
- Marius Goring as Shevik
- Scott Forbes as Pannell
- Colin Gordon as Kitteridge
- Guy Deghy as Dr. Lundgren
- Dermot Kelly as van driver
- Stuart Cooper as Dubrossman
- John Welsh as Heiner
- Clifford Earl as policeman
- Ron Pember as photographer
- Harry Locke as tramp
- Frederick Peisley as tramp
- Sidney Vivian as taxi driver
- Robert Raglan as Fennimore
- Bill Nagy as Embassy Attache
- Graham Lines as Immigration Officer
- John Clifford as Government chauffeur
- Freda Dowie as waitress
- Charles Lamb as caretaker
- Marian Diamond as schoolteacher
- Carmen Dene as club waitress
- Donna Reading as club waitress
- Valerie Hudson as club waitress
- Sheila Sands as nude
- Wendy Ascot as secretary
- Gretchen Franklin as bus conductress

== Production ==
Richard Todd made the film while appearing on stage in Dear Octopus. Gene Barry had previously made Maroc 7 for Rank. It was part of Rank's "Eurospy" cycle.

Filming began 16 January 1968.

== Critical reception ==
In The Monthly Film Bulletin Brenda Davies wrote: "This confused tale of cross and double-cross was made three years ago, presumably for American television, which at least explains why it bothers to employ a kind of Cook's tour of the London tourist spots as the background to its standard quota of bloodshed. The plot seems to have been manufactured by a computer fed on earlier spy thrillers (the meeting with Goldsmith in the empty stadium is straight out of The Quiller Memorandum) and its complications are so ludicrous that it is often difficult to remember who is chasing whom. Altogether, a sad waste of several very capable players."

Kine Weekly wrote: "Quite a good adventure-mystery yarn, with plenty of rough action, this should be acceptable in most situations. Reliable double-programmer. The film starts with a satisfying bit of mysterious violence and carries on in the vein, slowing only once for some conventional romantic scenes between Donovan and Anne. Mainly, however, the action jogs along satisfactorily from one bit of violence to another and the identity of the double-agent is fairly well concealed with the aid of the usual kind of red herring. Gene Barry (well known to TV addicts) is tough if not very clever as extra-special agent Donovan and Joan Collins is adequate and decorative as Anne. Richard Todd is required to do very little acting as the British Intelligence chief and even less is required of Michael Rennie as a high-up U.S. agent; whilst Marius Goring is sinister as the top foreign agent."

In the Radio Times, David McGillivray wrote, "despite endless double-crossing and a kidnapping, this is low on excitement and lacks a strong villain. With most of London's landmarks included along the way, it might appeal to the odd tourist. The presence of Joan Collins, dressed up to the nines, adds a bit of glamour."
