= 73rd NHK Kōhaku Uta Gassen =

Japanese television show

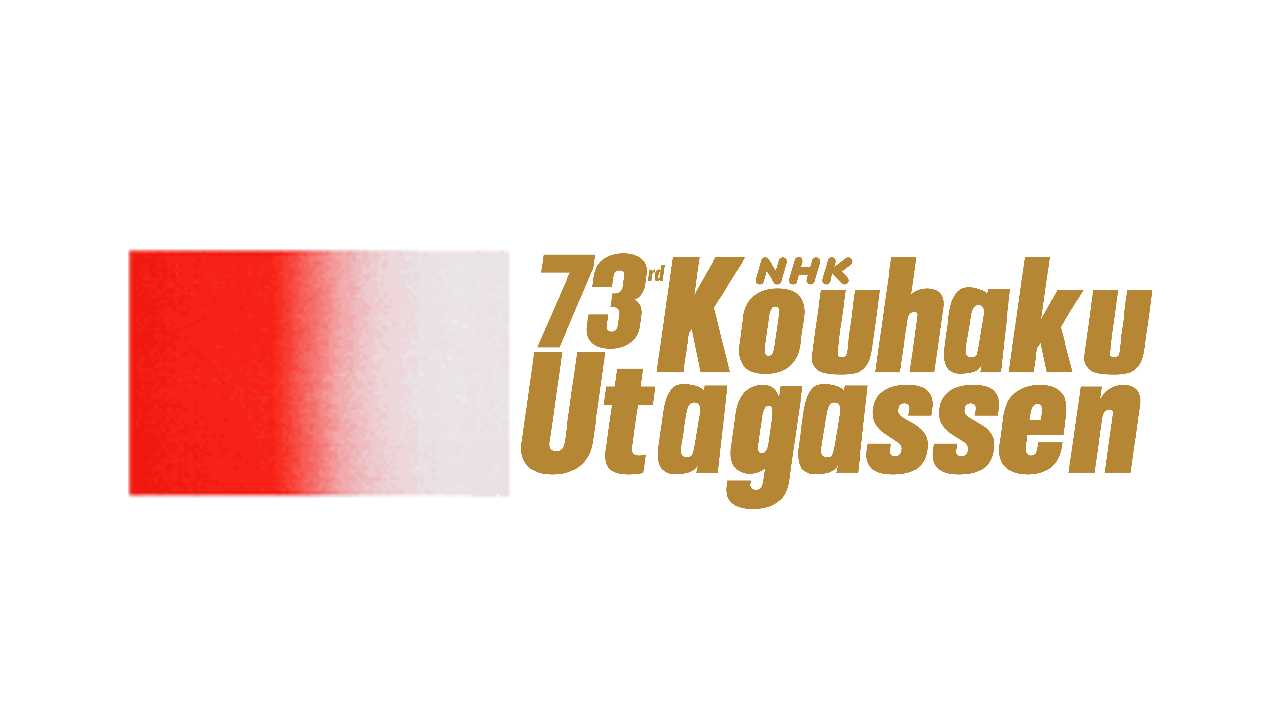
- Also known as: 73nd NHK Red & White Year-End Song Festival
- 第73回NHK紅白歌合戦: LOVE & PEACE－みんなでシェア!－
- Genre: Music; variety; special
- Created by: Tsumoru Kondo
- Presented by: Yo Oizumi; Kanna Hashimoto
- Narrated by: Takuya Eguchi; Saori Hayami
- Opening theme: "Hymne à l'amour" by Tokyo Ska Paradise Orchestra
- Ending theme: "Hotaru no Hikari"
- Composers: Takahiro Kaneko; Tsunaki Mihara
- Country of origin: Japan
- Original language: Japanese

Production
- Production location: NHK Hall
- Running time: 265 minutes
- Production company: NHK Enterprise Inc.

Original release
- Network: NHK-G; NHK World Premium; TV Japan
- Release: December 31, 2022

The 73rd NHK Kōhaku Uta Gassen (第73回NHK紅白歌合戦, Dai 73 Kai Enu Eichi Kei Kōhaku Uta Gassen) was the 2022 (Reiwa 4) edition of NHK's New Year's Eve TV special Kōhaku Uta Gassen held on December 31, 2022. The previous year, the broadcast was held from the Tokyo International Forum, due to renovations at NHK Hall. The NHK Broadcasting Center was also used. With renovations completed in June 2022, the show returned to be broadcast live from NHK Hall. Ive, Le Sserafim, Twice, and other groups appeared. The White Team won this contest.

== Events leading up to broadcast ==
On October 6, NHK announced the broadcast schedule, which started at 19:20 JST, and ended at 23:45 JST on December 31, with a 5-minute break for the latest news. In addition, it will be the first time since 2019 (70th) that the show will be held with an audience at NHK Hall. On October 11, Yo Oizumi and Kanna Hashimoto were announced as the hosts.

Due to copyright issues, Aimer and Uta's performances could not be shown on the NHK World Premium broadcast, with the artist's photo or the show's logo being shown instead.

== Artist lineup ==
Debuting artists Returning artists Special performances

List of 73rd NHK Kōhaku Uta Gassen performances
Red Team				White Team			
Order	Artist	Appearance	Song	Order	Artist	Appearance	Song
First half
Tokyo Ska Paradise Orchestra – "Opening Theme: Hymne à l'amour"
2	Yoshimi Tendo	27	"Sōran Matsuribushi"	1	SixTones	3	"Good Luck!"
3	Ryokuoushoku Shakai	1	"Mela!"	4	Hiromi Go	35	"Go!Go!50 Shunen!! SP Medley" (Note: "Otoko no Ko Onna no Ko", "Ringo Satsujin Jiken" (with Kanna Hashimoto), "Goldfinger'99", and "Jankenpon Go!!")
6	Kaori Mizumori	20	"Kujukuri Hama" (Nazotoki Kōhaku Special)	5	Naniwa Danshi	1	"Ubu Love"
7	Le Sserafim	1	"Fearless" (Japanese version)	8	Saucy Dog	1	"Cinderella Boy"
10	Hinatazaka46	4	"Kitsune"	9	Keisuke Yamauchi	8	"Koisuru Machikado" (Kitsune Dance remix)
12	Milet	3	"Fly High"	11	JO1	1	"Infinity"
13	NiziU	3	"Clap Clap"	14	Masayuki Suzuki	5	"Chigau, Sō Janai"
16	Sekai no Owari	6	"Habit"	15	Be:First	1	"Shining One"
18	Ive	1	"Eleven" (Japanese version)	17	Daichi Miura	4	"Sansan"
20	Perfume	15	"Kōhaku Medley 2022" (Note: "Spinning World" and "Chocolate Disco")	19	Snow Man	2	"Brother Beat" (Kōhaku Minna de Shē! SP)
The Last Rockstars – "The Last Rockstars"
21	Aimer	1	"Zankyōsanka"	—N/a			
22	Fuyumi Sakamoto	34	"Omatsuri Mambo" (Skapara SP)	—N/a			
Shun Oguri and Jun Matsumoto – "Taiga Drama Baton Touch Ceremony"
Second half
23	Uta (Note: Voice cast by Kaori Nazuka and singing voice by Ado)	1 (Note: Also first appearance of Ado)	"New Genesis"	24	King Gnu	2	"Stardom"
26	Twice	4	"Celebrate"	25	Hiroshi Miyama	8	"Yume Oibito" (Road to the 6th Kendama World Record)
Special stage – Disney Special Medley: Yo Oizumi and Kanna Hashimoto – "When You Wish Upon a Star"; Sho Sakurai, Ive, Snow Man, Be:First and Hinatazaka46 – "Jamboree Mickey!"; Misia – "Kimi no Negai ga Sekai o Kagayakasu"
28	Milet, Aimer, Lilas Ikuta and Vaundy	—	"Omokage"	27	Vaundy	1	"Kaijū no Hana Uta"
—N/a				29	Junretsu	5	"Propose" "Shiroi Kumo no Yō ni"
Back Number – "I Love You" (Note: Additionally contained "Takane no Hanako-san")
30	Nogizaka46	8	"Hadashi de Summer"	—N/a			
31	Shizuka Kudo	9	"35 Shunen SP Medley" (Note: "Arashi no Sugao" and "Kōsa ni Fukarete")	32	King & Prince	5	"Ichiban"
34	Aimyon	4	"Heart" "Kimi wa Rock o Kikanai"	33	Official Hige Dandism	3	"Subtitle"
Yūzō Kayama – "Umi Sono Ai"
35	Superfly	6	"Beautiful"	36	Fujii Kaze	2	"Shinunoga E-wa"
37	Ryōko Shinohara	2	"Itoshisa to Setsunasa to Kokoro Zuyosa to 2023"	38	Yuzu	13	"Natsuiro"
—N/a				39	Kanjani Eight	11	"T.W.L"
—N/a				40	Gen Hoshino	8	"Comedy"
Kiyoshi Hikawa – "Genkai Toppa×Survivor"
Yumi Matsutoya with Yumi Arai – "Call Me Back" (Note: Additionally contained "Sotsugyō Shashin")
—N/a				41	Kinki Kids	2	"25th Anniversary Medley" (Note: "Garasu no Shōnen" and "Amazing Love")
Anzen Chitai – "I Love You kara Hajime Yō" (Note: Additionally contained "Melody")
42	Sayuri Ishikawa	45	"Amagi-goe"	—N/a			
Keisuke Kuwata featuring Motoharu Sano, Masanori Sera, Char, Goro Noguchi – "Jidai Okure no Rock'n'Roll Band" (Note: Additionally contained Yūzō Kayama's 1965 single "Yozora no Hoshi" without Sano)
43	Misia	7	"Kibō no Uta"	44	Masaharu Fukuyama	15	"Sakura Zaka"

== Voting system ==
This year, the 3-Point System was used again. One point is given from the judges, another one from audience in TIF, and last one from the viewers. The team with at least 2 points is declared winner of the 73nd edition. This year, the finale song "Hotaru no Hikari" was performed before winning team announcement.

Guest judges

- Miyako Yoshida, stage manager of the New National Theatre Tokyo and dancer;
- Haruka Fukuhara, actress, singer and model;
- Kodo Nishimura, Buddhist monk, artist, author and advocate for LGBTQ rights;
- Mana Ashida, actress, talent and singer;
- Tetsuko Kuroyanagi, actress, television personality, World Wide Fund for Nature advisor, and Goodwill Ambassador for UNICEF;
- Jun Matsumoto, singer, actor, radio host and model. He is a member of the boy band Arashi;
- Hajime Moriyasu, football manager and former player;
- Munetaka Murakami, baseball infielder for the Tokyo Yakult Swallows of Nippon Professional Baseball (NPB);
- Bandō Yajūrō, Kabuki actor;
- Yuzuru Hanyu, two-time Olympic champion in figure skating.

Results
Method	Votes		Points
Method	Red Team	White Team	Points
Guest Judges	7	3	Red
NHK Hall Audience	821	1561	White
Viewers (Japan only)	1,586,214	2,685,356	White
Winner	White Team		
