= Unfair: The End =

- Poster
- アンフェア the end
- Directed by: Shimako Satō
- Based on: Unfair
- Starring: Ryoko Shinohara
- Release date: September 5, 2015
- Running time: 108
- Country: Japan
- Language: Japanese
- Box office: ¥1.79 billion

Unfair: The End (アンフェア the end) is a 2015 Japanese police procedural thriller film based on the Japanese television drama series Unfair. It follows two other films based on the series, Unfair: The Movie (2007) and Unfair 2: The Answer (2011). The film is directed by Shimako Satō, who also directed the previous film, with Ryoko Shinohara reprising her role from the series and films. It was released on September 5, 2015.

== Cast ==
- Ryoko Shinohara
- Kento Nagayama
- Sadao Abe
- Masaya Kato
- Akira
- Susumu Terajima
- Kōichi Satō
- Mion Mukaichi

== Reception ==
=== Box office ===
The film was number-one at the Japanese box office on its opening weekend by number of admissions (214,000), and was second place by gross revenue, with ¥295 million. On its second weekend it earned ¥191 million and again placed second by gross revenue. By September 29, it had earned ¥1.79 billion.
