= Unfair (TV series) =

- アンフェア
- Genre: Drama
- Based on: Suiri Shōsetsu by Takehiko Hata
- Screenplay by: Ryoko Shinohara
- Directed by: Yoshinori Kobayashi; Nobuyuki Takahashi; Yasushi Ueda; Kazumasa Nemoto
- Music by: Norihito Sumitomo
- Country of origin: Japan
- Original language: Japanese
- No. of episodes: 11

Production
- Producers: Hideki Yoshijo (KTV); Hideki Inada (Kyodo TV)
- Production companies: KTV; Kyodo Television

Original release
- Network: FNS (KTV, Fuji TV)
- Release: January 10 – March 21, 2006

Unfair (Japanese: アンフェア, Hepburn: Anfea) is an action Japanese television drama with 11 episodes and one TV special, aired in Japan in 2006 on KTV, Fuji Television and its affiliates, and followed by a movie Unfair: The Movie in 2007 with the same cast. Two other films have also been released: Unfair 2: The Answer in 2011 and Unfair: The End in 2015.

== Synopsis ==
Yukihira Natsumi works as a police officer at the murder squad of Tokyo. She can differentiate felonies only into black and white but nothing in between ever since her father was murdered, so her guiding principle is to punish criminals by whatever legal action it takes. Beside Yukihira's success at work, her private life is a mess after creating a public scandal at a hostage-taking scene.

After another risky action taken at a hostage-site, her boss assigns her a new partner, Ando Kazuyuki, a rookie cop, who is supposed to look after her.

This drama follows Yukihira and Ando solving a serial murder case.

== Cast ==
- Ryoko Shinohara as Yukihira Natsumi
- Eita as Ando Kazuyuki
- Kato Masaya as Mikami Kaoru
- Sadao Abe as Kokubo Yuji
- Mari Hamada (濱田マリ) as Hasumi Anna
- Shiga Kotaro as Yasumoto Masahiro
- Mion Mukaichi as Sato Mio (7)
- Inoue Jun as Kurume Ryuichiro
- Kimura Tae as Makimura Kiyoko (35)
- Susumu Terajima as Yamaji Tetsuo
