= Swallows and Amazons (1974 film) =

1974 British film by Claude Whatham

- Directed by: Claude Whatham
- Written by: Arthur Ransome (book); David Wood
- Produced by: Richard Pilbrow
- Starring: Virginia McKenna; Ronald Fraser
- Music by: Wilfred Josephs
- Distributed by: EMI Films
- Release date: 1974
- Country: United Kingdom
- Language: English
- Budget: £250,000

Swallows and Amazons is a 1974 British film adaptation of the 1930 novel of the same name by Arthur Ransome. The film, which was directed by Claude Whatham and produced by Richard Pilbrow, starred Virginia McKenna and Ronald Fraser, with Zanna Hamilton. Its budget was provided by Nat Cohen of EMI Films who had funded the successful 1970 film The Railway Children.

== Plot ==
During the school holidays, the Walker children (John, Susan, Titty and Roger; the Swallows) are staying at a farm near a lake in the Lake District. They sail a borrowed dinghy named Swallow, and camp on a lake island which they call Wild Cat Island.

They meet two local girls, Nancy and Peggy Blackett, who sail a dinghy named Amazon and live in Beckfoot a house up the nearby Amazon River. The Amazons (the Blackett girls; they call themselves "Amazon Pirates" and fly the "Jolly Roger" on their yacht) have been coming to the island for years, and claim it as their territory. So the scene is set for serious rivalry.

Eventually they make friends and agree to join forces against a common enemy – the Blacketts' Uncle Jim (Jim Turner) whom they call "Captain Flint" (after the character in Treasure Island). Uncle Jim, normally an ally of his nieces, has withdrawn from their company to write his memoirs and has become decidedly unfriendly.

To determine who should be the overall leader in their campaign against Captain Flint, the Blacketts and the Walkers have a contest to see which can capture the others' boat. As part of their strategy the Walkers make a dangerous crossing of the lake by night, and John is later cautioned by his mother for this reckless act. The Walkers nevertheless win the contest – thanks to Titty who seizes the Amazon when the Blacketts come to Wild Cat Island. Eventually there is a mock battle between "Captain Flint" and the children, after which Uncle Jim is tried for his crimes and forced to walk the plank on his own houseboat. They agree at the post-battle feast to be friends forever.

== Cast ==
- Virginia McKenna as Mrs. Walker
- Ronald Fraser as Uncle Jim
- Simon West as John Walker
- Suzanna Hamilton as Susan Walker
- Sophie Neville as Titty Walker
- Stephen Grendon as Roger Walker
- Kit Seymour as Nancy Blackett
- Lesley Bennett as Peggy Blackett
- Mike Pratt as Mr. Dixon
- Brenda Bruce as Mrs. Dixon
- John Franklyn-Robbins as Young Billy
- Jack Woolgar as Old Billy
- David Blagden as Policeman

== Production ==
The film was shot on location in the Lake District National Park in Cumbria during the summer of 1973. Actual locations were used to recreate the fictional lake in Arthur Ransome's novel. In April 2010, the dinghy named Swallow in the film was bought by a group of enthusiasts who restored her to sailing condition.

== Release ==
EMI distributed the film in the UK in 1974.

== Home media ==
The film has been made available on video, both in VHS and DVD, in the UK, but is not readily available in the US and elsewhere.
