= The Magic Aster =

- Film poster
- Starring: Yao Ming; Lin Chi-ling; Leon Lai
- Production companies: Shanghai Animation Film Studio; Xiamen Shangchen Science and Technology Company; Shanghai Chengtai Investment Management Company
- Release date: 19 June 2009
- Running time: 80 minutes
- Country: China
- Language: Mandarin

The Magic Aster (Chinese: 马兰花; pinyin: Ma Lan Hua) is a Chinese animated film. It was released on 19 June 2009 by Shanghai Animation Film Studio, Xiamen Shangchen Science and Technology Company and the Shanghai Chengtai Investment Management Company.

== Cast ==
The film included a notable voice cast of celebrities.

Name	Voiced by
Dalan	Lin Chi-ling
Malang	Leon Lai
Old Daddy	Yao Ming
	Kenji Wu
	Valen Hsu
Xiaolan	Chen Hao
	Zhou Libo
	Gao Yuan
