= Shimako Satō =

Japanese screenwriter and film director (born 1964)

- Born: 1964 (age 61–62); Iwate Prefecture, Japan
- Education: London Film School
- Occupations: Screenwriter, film director
- Spouse: Takashi Yamazaki (m. 2012)

Shimako Satō (佐藤嗣麻子, Satō Shimako) (born in 1964) is a Japanese film director and screenwriter. She is best known for directing Eko Eko Azarak: Wizard of Darkness (1995) and K-20: Legend of the Mask (2008). Her husband is famed filmmaker Takashi Yamazaki.

== Career ==
Born in Iwate Prefecture, Satō attended the Asagaya College of Art and Design before studying filmmaking at the London International Film School. Her 1995 film Wizard of Darkness won the Minami Toshiko Award at the 1995 Yubari International Fantastic Film Festival.

== Filmography ==
Film

Year	Title	Director	Writer	Ref.
1992	Tale of a Vampire	Yes	Yes	
1995	Eko Eko Azarak: Wizard of Darkness	Yes	No	
1996	Eko Eko Azarak 2: Birth of the Wizard	Yes	No	
2007	Unfair: The Movie	No	Yes	
2008	K-20: Legend of the Mask	Yes	Yes	
2010	Ghost: In Your Arms Again	No	Yes	
2010	Space Battleship Yamato	No	Yes	
2011	Unfair 2: The Answer	Yes	Yes	
2015	Unfair: The End	No	Yes	
2024	The Yin Yang Master Zero	Yes	Yes	

TV miniseries

Year	Title	Director	Writer
2000	Yasha	Yes	Yes
2001	Sitto no nioi	Yes	Yes
2003	Dôbutsu no oisha-san	Yes	No
2004	Minami-kun no Koibito	Yes	No
2013	Dokushin kizoku	No	Yes
2014	Miyamoto Musashi	No	Yes
2015	Siren	No	Yes
2015	Tales of the Unusual: Film directors special	Yes	No

Video game CG movie sequences director

- Resident Evil Code: Veronica/Code: Veronica X (Note: For Sega Dreamcast, Sony PlayStation 2, Nintendo GameCube, Microsoft Xbox 360, And Sony PlayStation 3) (2000-2001)
- Onimusha: Warlords (Note: For Sony PlayStation 2, Microsoft Xbox, Microsoft Windows) (2001)
