= Eko Eko Azarak (manga) =

Japanese horror manga series

- Cover of the first volume of Eko Eko Azarak, published in 1976

エコエコアザラク (Eko Eko Azaraku)
- Genre: Horror
- Manga
- Written by: Shinichi Koga
- Published by: Akita Shoten
- Magazine: Weekly Shōnen Champion
- Original run: September 1, 1975 – March 1979
- Volumes: 19
- Live-action film

Eko Eko Azarak -Wizard of Darkness-
- Directed by: Shimako Sato
- Written by: Junki Takegami
- Released: April 8, 1995
- Runtime: 80 minutes
- Live-action film

Eko Eko Azarak II -Birth of the Wizard-
- Directed by: Shimako Sato
- Written by: Shimako Sato
- Released: April 20, 1996
- Runtime: 83 minutes
- Television drama
- Original run: February 1, 1997 – May 31, 1997
- Episodes: 26
- Live-action film

Eko Eko Azarak III -Misa The Dark Angel-
- Directed by: Katsuhito Ueno
- Written by: Kyoichi Nanatsuki; Sotaro Hayashi
- Released: January 15, 1998
- Runtime: 95 minutes
- Television drama

Eko Eko Azarak -eye-
- Directed by: Mitsunori Hattori
- Written by: Chiaki J. Konaka
- Original network: TV Tokyo
- Original run: January 6, 2004 – March 30, 2004
- Episodes: 13
- Live-action film

Eko Eko Azarak R-page
- Directed by: Taichi Ito
- Written by: Hiromitsu Amano
- Studio: Avex Entertainment, Inc.
- Released: 2006
- Live-action film

Eko Eko Azarak B-page
- Directed by: Taichi Ito
- Written by: Hiromitsu Amano
- Studio: Avex Entertainment, Inc.
- Released: 2006
- Original video animation
- Directed by: Nagae Toshikazu
- Written by: Shinichi Koga
- Studio: Toei Animation
- Released: January 30, 2007
- Runtime: 24 minutes
- Manga

Eko Eko Azarak: Reborn
- Written by: J-ta Yamada
- Published by: Akita Shoten
- English publisher: NA: Titan Comics
- Magazine: Champion Red
- Original run: March 19, 2020 – March 17, 2023
- Volumes: 4
- icon

Eko Eko Azarak (Japanese: エコエコアザラク, Hepburn: Eko Eko Azaraku) is a Japanese horror manga series by Shinichi Koga. It has been adapted into a live action film series with six films, two Japanese television drama series and an original video animation.

== Plot ==
According to her fellow students, Misa is a star student and an idol of the classroom. However, she is also a young witch who goes from school to school using black magic in order to enact chaotic and brutal justice. Along the way, her strange past is revealed.

== Media ==
=== Manga ===
The manga was published by Akita Shoten, with serialization in Weekly Shōnen Champion from September 1, 1975, to April 9, 1979 and compiled into 19 volumes published from March 1976 to July 1979.

After the end of the original series, a sequel, Majo Kuroi Misa was serialized in Weekly Shōnen Champion in 1982, and was compiled in 2 volumes.. A third series, Eko Eko Azarak II, was serialized in Weekly Shōnen Champion and Suspiria, starting in 1993 and compiled into 6 volumes. Both these series were written and drawn by the series original creator, Shinichi Koga. In 2020, two years after the death of Shinichi Koga, a remake series by J-ta Yamada, titled Eko Eko Azarak: Reborn began serialization in Champion Red. The series ended serialization on March 17, 2023. In 2025, Titan Comics announced that they had licensed the remake manga for English publication beginning in April 2026.

=== Films ===
- Eko Eko Azarak: Wizard of Darkness (1995)
- Eko Eko Azarak II: Birth of the Wizard (1996)
- Eko Eko Azarak III: Misa The Dark Angel (1998)
- Eko Eko Azarak IV: Awakening (2001)
- Eko Eko Azarak: R-page (2006)
- Eko Eko Azarak: B-page (2006)
- "Eko Eko Azarak: Kuroi Misa First Episode" (2011)

=== Dramas ===
A live-action school horror drama series was broadcast from February 1 to May 31, 1997, on TV Tokyo, consisting of 26 episodes. The cast included Hinako Saeki as Misa Kuroi and also Rie Imamura, Banhō Chō, Jirō Dan and Rumi Sakakibara. In 2004, another horror drama series named Eko Eko Azarak -eye- (エコエコアザラク〜眼〜, Eko Eko Azaraku ~Manako~) was broadcast from January 6 to March 30, also on TV Tokyo, with 13 episodes. The cast included Natsuhi Ueno as Misa Kuroi and also Yoko Mitsuya, Sayuri Anzu and Aiko Kayō.

=== Anime ===
An anime adaptation by Toei Animation was released as an OVA on January 30, 2007.
