= Neoniphon =

- Neoniphon sammara

Scientific classification
- Kingdom: Animalia
- Phylum: Chordata
- Class: Actinopterygii
- Division: Teleostei
- Order: Beryciformes
- Family: Holocentridae
- Subfamily: Holocentrinae
- Genus: Neoniphon; Castelnau, 1875

Synonyms
- Flammeo

Genus of fishes

Neoniphon is a genus of squirrelfishes.

== Species ==
There are currently 9 recognized species in this genus:

Image	Species	Common name
	Neoniphon argenteus Valenciennes, 1831	Clearfin squirrelfish
	Neoniphon aurolineatus F. Liénard (fr), 1839	Yellowstriped squirrelfish
	Neoniphon coruscus (Poey, 1860)	Reef squirrelfish
	Neoniphon marianus G. Cuvier, 1829	Longjaw squirrelfish
	Neoniphon opercularis Valenciennes, 1831	Blackfin squirrelfish
	Neoniphon pencei Copus, Pyle & Earle, 2015	Pence's squirrelfish
	Neoniphon sammara Forsskål, 1775	Sammara squirrelfish
	Neoniphon suborbitalis (Gill, 1863)	Tinsel squirrelfish
	Neoniphon vexillarius (Poey, 1860)	Dusky squirrelfish
