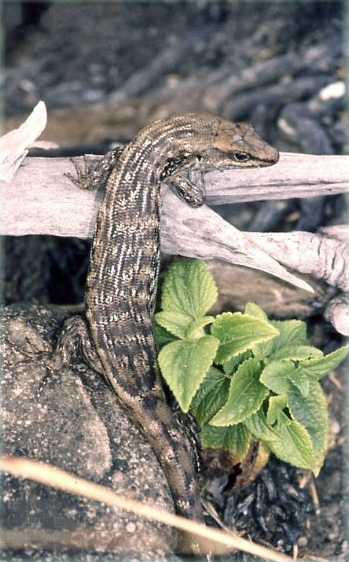

Conservation status
- Vulnerable (IUCN 3.1)

Scientific classification
- Kingdom: Animalia
- Phylum: Chordata
- Class: Reptilia
- Order: Squamata
- Family: Scincidae
- Genus: Leiolopisma
- Species: L. telfairii

Binomial name
- Leiolopisma telfairii (Desjardins, 1831)

Synonyms
- Scincus telfairii Desjardins, 1831; Leiolopisma telfairii — A.M.C. Duméril & Bibron, 1839; Lygosoma telfairii — Boulenger, 1887; Leiolopisma telfairii — Greer, 1974

= Leiolopisma telfairii =

Species of lizard

Leiolopisma telfairii, also known commonly as the Round Island ground skink, the Round Island skink, and Telfair's skink, is a species of lizard in the family Scincidae. The species is endemic to Round Island, one of the islands of Mauritius.

== Taxonomy ==
Other members of the genus Leiolopisma occur on New Caledonia and New Zealand, but the Round Island skink is closely related to the two extinct Mascarenes taxa, L. mauritiana from Mauritius and L. ceciliae from Réunion.

== Etymology ==
L. telfairii is named after Irish botanist Charles Telfair, the founder of the Royal Society of Arts and Sciences of Mauritius.

== Description ==
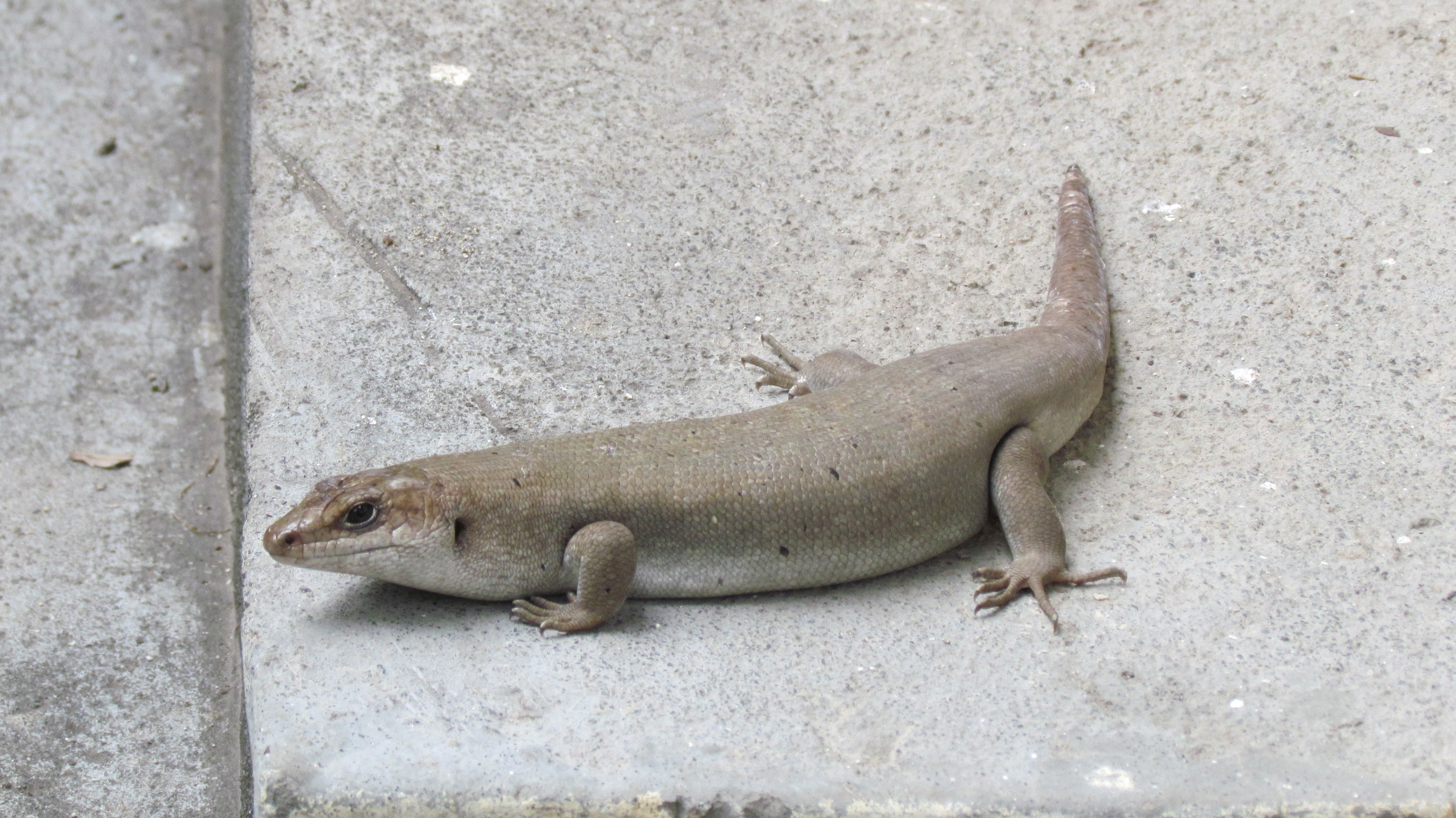
Specimen

L. telfairii reaches a total length (including tail) of between 30–40 cm (12–16 in). The body is generally brownish grey mottled with dark brown spots. The small scales exhibit an iridescence when the sunlight is reflected on them. The body is approximately cylindrical. L. telfairii can cast its relatively long tail during a fight or to escape capture; the tail is regenerated after a while. The short but vigorous legs are used to dig burrows.

== Ecology ==
The omnivorous diet of L. telfairii consists of seeds, fruits, insects, and small lizards. Cannibalism is not unknown, and L. telfairii may even kill its own young to eat them.

== Status and conservation ==
L. telfairii was once numerous on Mauritius and offshore islands like Flat Island and even Rodrigues. Due to habitat destruction and introduced species like goats, black rats, and rabbits, it has been limited to Round Island since the middle of the 19th century. When Gerald Durrell visited Round Island in the 1970s he recorded 5,000 specimens. He brought some specimens to the Jersey Zoo to build up a captive breeding program. Since the eradication of the goats and rabbits on Round Island, the skink population has increased to the point that some could be relocated to other islands, like Gunner's Quoin (Coin du Mire) and the Île aux Aigrettes.
