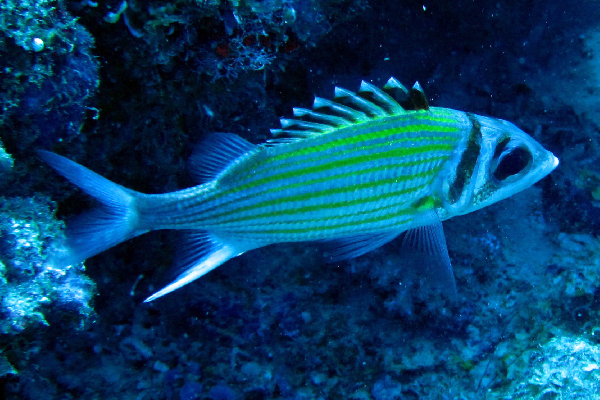

Conservation status
- Least Concern (IUCN 3.1)

Scientific classification
- Kingdom: Animalia
- Phylum: Chordata
- Class: Actinopterygii
- Division: Teleostei
- Order: Beryciformes
- Family: Holocentridae
- Genus: Neoniphon
- Species: N. aurolineatus

Binomial name
- Neoniphon aurolineatus (Liénard, 1839)

Synonyms
- Holocentrus anjouanae Fourmanoir, 1962; Adioryx anjouanae (Fourmanoir, 1962)

= Neoniphon aurolineatus =

Species of fish

Neoniphon aurolineatus, more commonly known as the yellowstriped squirrelfish or gold-lined squirrelfish, is a member of the family Holocentridae.

== Habitat ==
It has a wide range throughout the Indian and Pacific Oceans stretching east from Mauritius to Hawaii and south from Japan to the Great Barrier Reef of Australia. It lives on the outer reef slopes at depths between 30 and 188 metres (98 and 617 ft). It lives near the ocean floor or in caves, generally staying alone or in small groups.

== Diet ==
It feeds on crustaceans and can reach sizes of up to 25.0 centimetres (9.8 in) TL. It is listed as "Least Concern" by the IUCN due to its deep-water habitat and lack of known major threats.

== Social Behavior and Survival ==
The Neoniphon aurolineatus have been shown to make noises that are often associated with social behaviors. In addition to this, there is also updated research showing that the Neoniphon aurolineatus does have natural known predators, such as the Morrey eel, and it is suggested that to sound that the fish make could be being used to warn others of predators.

== Environmental Adaptations ==
The Neoniphon aurolineatus are also shown to have adapted based on their environment, for example deeper ocean species of this fish have evolutionarily adapted to seeing more efficiently the color blue. This was also demonstrated in the shallow varieties, however they have adapted to seeing the color green more efficiently. This is not the only evolutionary trait, and despite research suggesting that deeper ocean environments are less susceptible to changes due to environmental disturbances, the Neoniphon aurolineatus has been observed to share a similar taxonomy in shallow ocean environments.
