= Pristiorhynchus =

Scientific classification
- Kingdom: Animalia
- Phylum: Platyhelminthes
- Class: Cestoda
- Order: Trypanorhyncha
- Family: Otobothriidae
- Genus: Pristiorhynchus; Schaeffner & Beveridge, 2013
- Species: P. palmi

Binomial name
- Pristiorhynchus palmi Schaeffner & Beveridge, 2013

Genus of flatworms

Pristiorhynchus is a genus of tapeworm, currently containing a single species, Pristiorhynchus palmi.

== Etymology ==
The generic name is derived from its host group, Pristidae. The specific epithet is in honor of Professor H. W. Palm, "in recognition of his contribution to the systematics of trypanorhynch cestodes."
