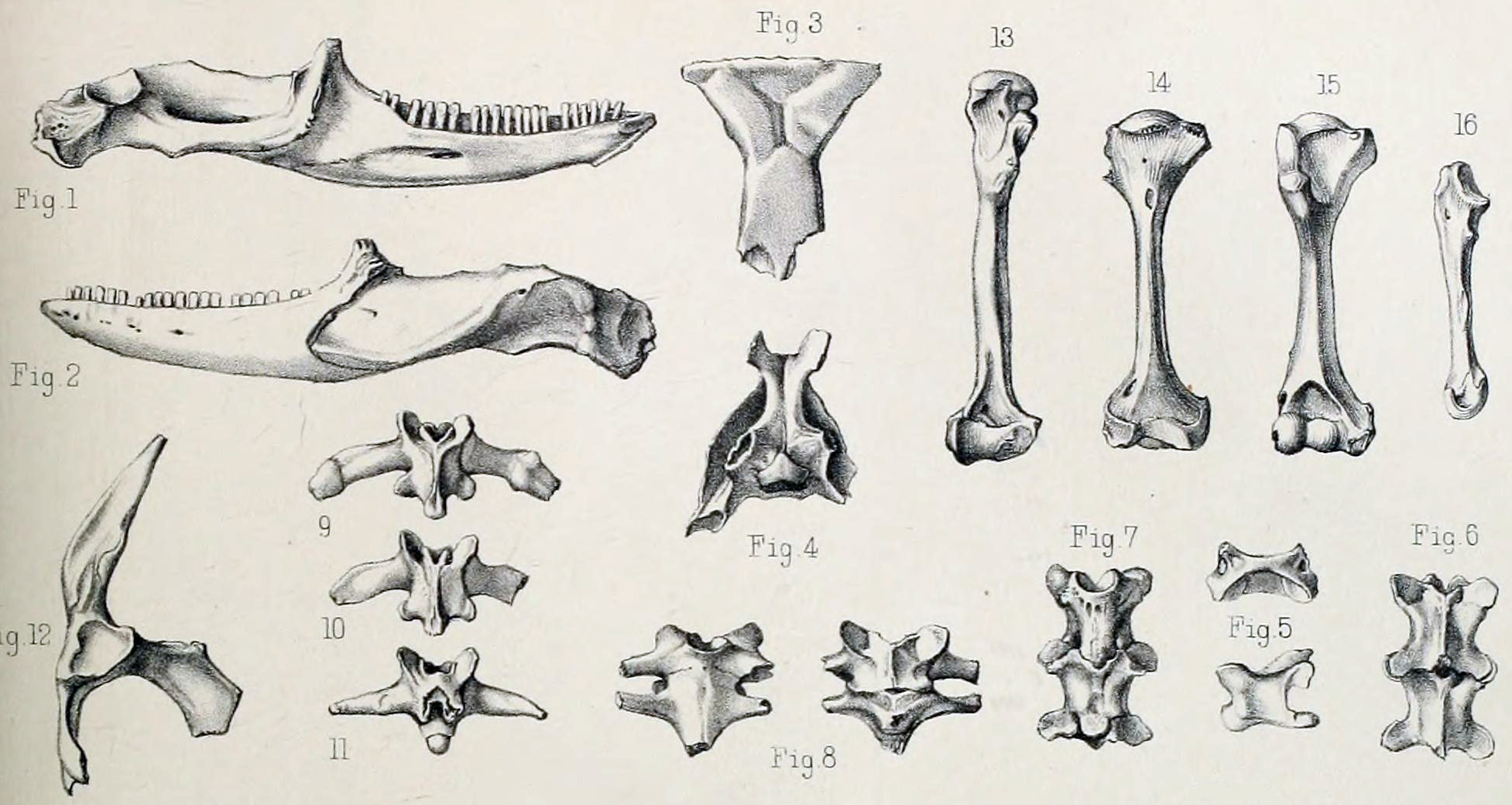
- Fossils

Conservation status
- Extinct (17th century) (IUCN 3.1)

Scientific classification
- Kingdom: Animalia
- Phylum: Chordata
- Class: Reptilia
- Order: Squamata
- Family: Scincidae
- Genus: Leiolopisma
- Species: †L. mauritiana

Binomial name
- †Leiolopisma mauritiana (Günther, 1877)

Synonyms
- Didosaurus mauritianus

= Mauritian giant skink =

Leiolopisma mauritiana

Extinct species of lizard

The Mauritian giant skink (Leiolopisma mauritiana) is a large, extinct species of skink It was found only in Mauritius. It became extinct sometime in the 17th century, likely due to human-introduced predators.

== Taxonomy ==
The Réunion giant skink (Leiolopisma ceciliae), another extinct species, was closely related to the Mauritian giant skink. The Round Island ground skink (Leiolopisma telfairii) is a more distantly related surviving species from Mauritius.

Only a semicomplete specimen is known in addition to some odd bones. (Supposedly, a former director of the Mauritian Institute threw away specimens including some bones of this species.) The remaining skeleton is missing the feet and digits, thus making it impossible for a SENI biometric analysis per se (Schnirel, 2004). The semicomplete skeleton does have a skull shaped similar to that of a blue-tongue skink (Tiliqua).

== Description ==
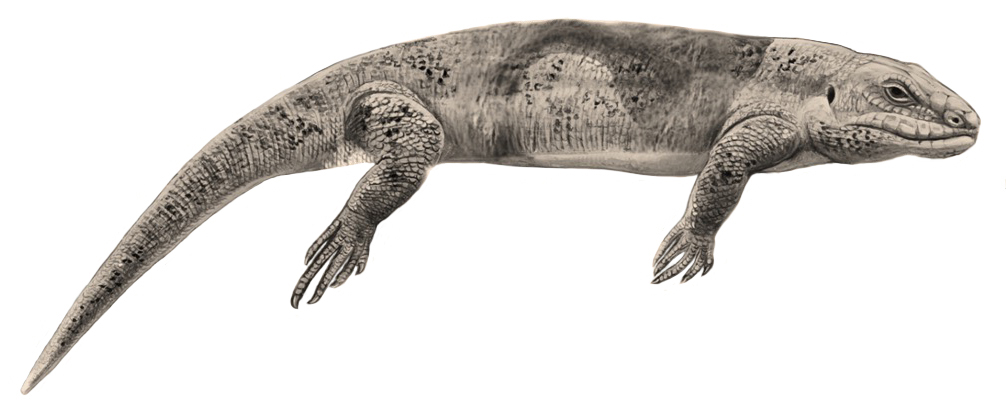
Life restoration by Julian P. Hume

Little is known about this species. It is believed it grew up to around 80 centimeters (31 inches) in length, making it one of the largest skinks in history.

== Ecology and behavior ==
The behavior of this animal is not well known or documented by any travelers to Mauritius when it was extant, however many things such as its diet and other aspects of its behavior can most likely be determined by extant skink species. It is very likely that the Mauritian giant skink shared behavioral traits with many other ground-based skinks such as the blue-tongued skink such as its diet and its overall temperament and speed. It may have been omnivorous, eating a diet of seeds, fruits, invertebrates and small lizards. It was also possibly capable of digging burrows. Its temperament was most likely very similar to that of modern ground skinks and was most likely a very tame animal that had relatively no fear of humans which might have played a part in its extinction.

The restoration undertaken by the (Species in Bronze Project), if accurate, gives a SENI value of .06 which would indicate that this species could have been fossorial or saxicolous in lifestyle. This is further linked by the fact that the closest living relative of this species (as mentioned by the restorers) is the Round Island ground skink (Leiolopisma telfairii). The Round Island ground skink also gives a SENI value of .06. The Round Island skink is a species capable of caudal autotomy. This skink is often seen darting in the underbrush or between rocks.

== Sources ==
- https://nixillustration.com/science-illustration/2019/island-weirdness-26-mauritian-giant-skink/
- Austin, J.J. & Arnold, E.N. (2006): Using ancient and recent DNA to explore relationships of extinct and endangered Leiolopisma skinks (Reptilia: Scincidae) in the Mascarene islands. Molecular Phylogenetics and Evolution 39(2): 503–511. doi:10.1016/j.ympev.2005.12.011 (HTML abstract)
- Cole, N. (2021). "Leiolopisma mauritiana". IUCN Red List of Threatened Species. 2021 e.T11410A166839636. doi:10.2305/IUCN.UK.2021-2.RLTS.T11410A166839636.en. Database entry includes justification for why this species is extinct.
- Schnirel, Brian L.; (2004). Seni biometric analysis on the extinct Scincidae species: Macroscincus coctei. Polyphemos, Volume 2, Issue 1, May, Florence, South Carolina, U.S.A. pp. 12–22.
