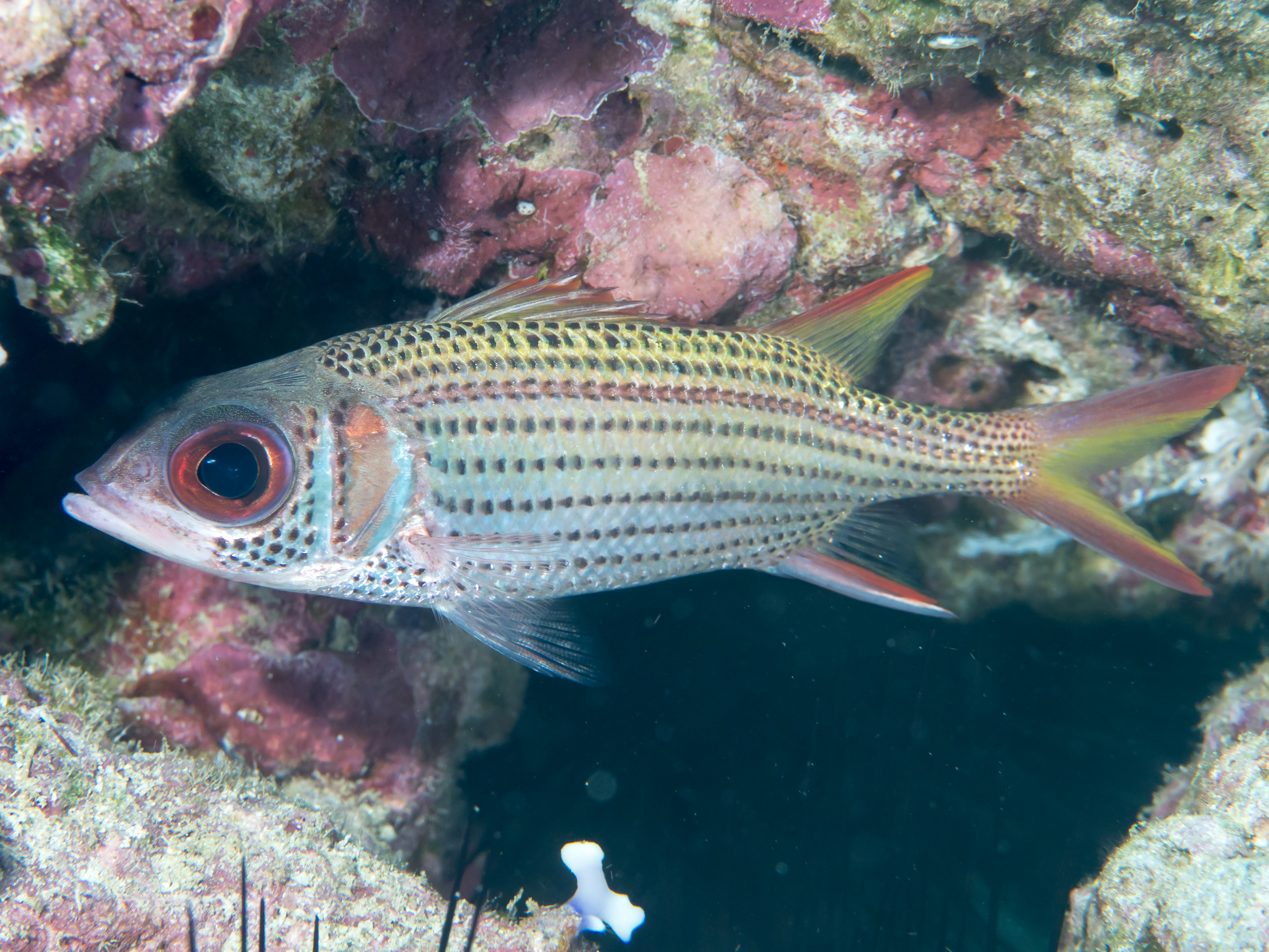
- In Indonesia

Conservation status
- Least Concern (IUCN 3.1)

Scientific classification
- Kingdom: Animalia
- Phylum: Chordata
- Class: Actinopterygii
- Division: Teleostei
- Order: Beryciformes
- Family: Holocentridae
- Genus: Neoniphon
- Species: N. argenteus

Binomial name
- Neoniphon argenteus (Valenciennes, 1831)

Synonyms
- List: Holocentrum argenteum Valenciennes, 1831; Flammeo argenteus (Valenciennes, 1831); Neoniphon argentius (Valenciennes, 1831); Holocentrum stercusmuscarum Valenciennes, 1831; Holocentrum laeve Günther, 1859; Holocentrus laeve Günther, 1859; Holocentrus laevis Günther, 1859

= Neoniphon argenteus =

Species of fish

Neoniphon argenteus, the clearfin squirrelfish or silver squirrelfish, is marine fish of the family Holocentridae. It is native to the Indo-Pacific

== Distribution ==
This Indo-Pacific fish is distributed from East Africa eastwards to the Marquesan Islands. It is found as far north as the Ryukyu Islands and as far south as northern Australia.

== Biology ==
In Fiji

It is found mainly around islands and shallow reefs, and like N. sammara is associated with Acropora corals. Its depth range is 3–20 m (9.8–65.6 ft) and it can reach sizes of up to 24.0 cm (9.4 in) TL. It feeds primarily on benthic invertebrates.

== Utilization ==
It is found in the ornamental trade and can be used as bait in tuna fisheries, but there are currently no known major threats to the species.
