= Spaghetti worm =

Spaghetti worm can refer to:

- Terebellidae, a family of marine polychaete worms
- Trypanorhyncha, an order of cestodes (parasitic flatworms)
