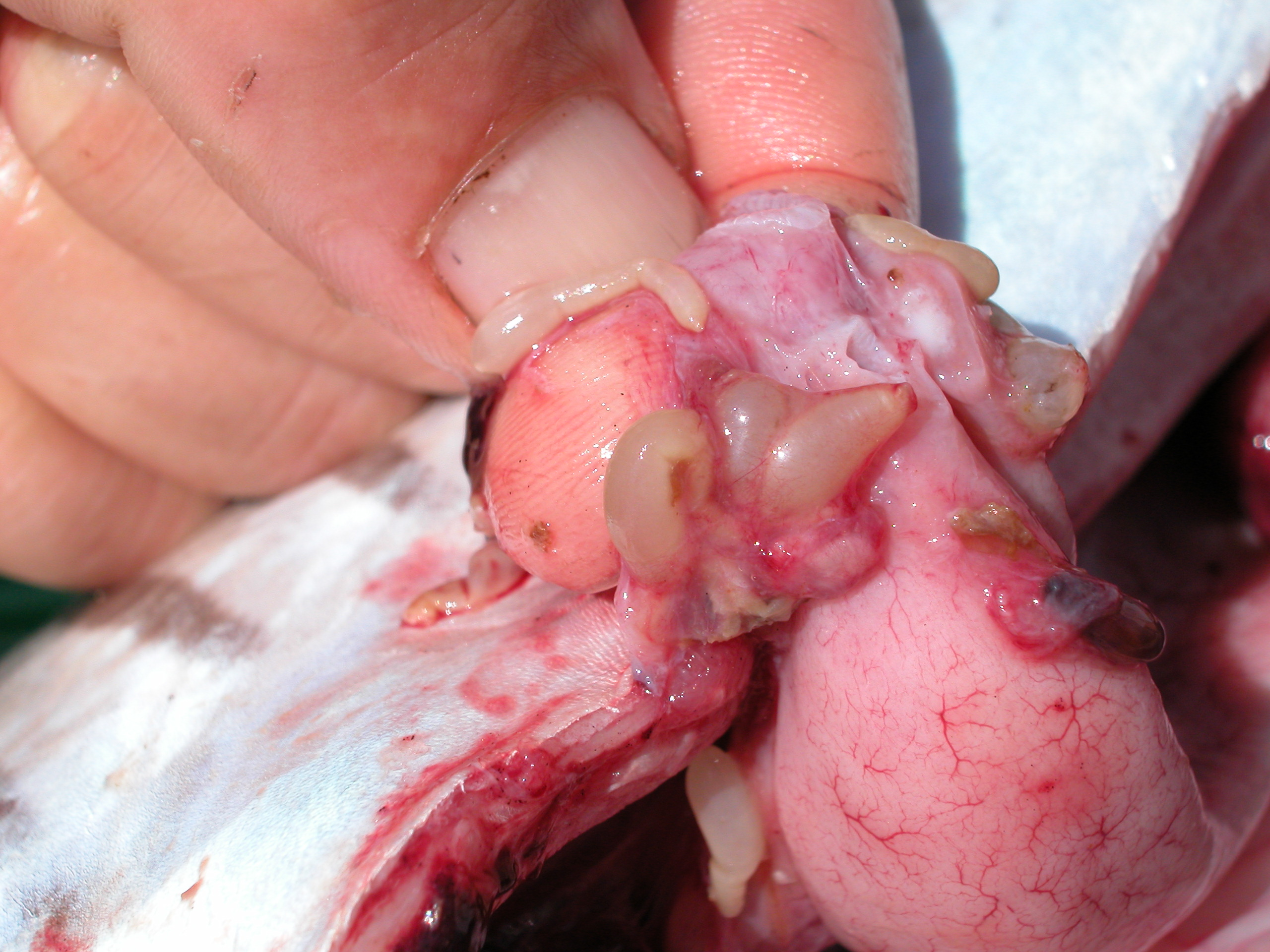
- Callitetrarhynchus gracilis is parasiting on Scomberomorus commerson

Scientific classification
- Kingdom: Animalia
- Phylum: Platyhelminthes
- Class: Cestoda
- Order: Trypanorhyncha
- Family: Lacistorhynchidae
- Genus: Callitetrarhynchus; Pintner, 1931

= Callitetrarhynchus =

Genus of flatworms

Callitetrarhynchus is a genus of flatworms belonging to the family Lacistorhynchidae.

The species of this genus are found in Australia and America.

Species:

- Callitetrarhynchus gracilis (Rudolphi, 1819) Pintner, 1931
- Callitetrarhynchus speciosus (Linton, 1897) Carvajal & Rego, 1985
