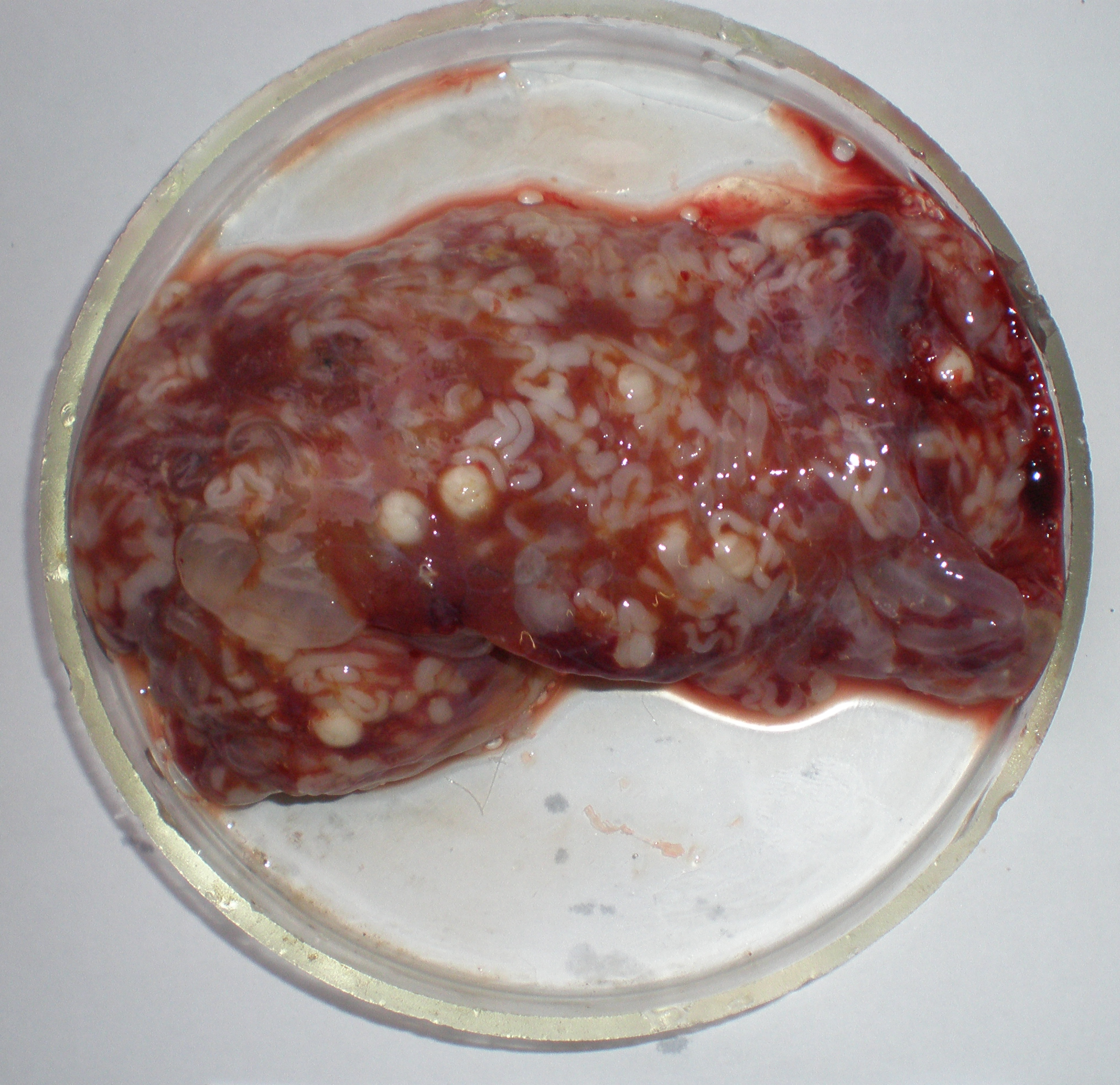
- Molicola horridus in the liver of Diodon hystrix

Scientific classification
- Kingdom: Animalia
- Phylum: Platyhelminthes
- Class: Cestoda
- Order: Trypanorhyncha
- Family: Gymnorhynchidae
- Genus: Molicola
- Species: M. horridus

Binomial name
- Molicola horridus (Goodsir, 1841) Dollfus, 1935

= Molicola horridus =

Species of flatworm

Molicola horridus is a species of tapeworm. The adult worm is found in the spiral valve in the lower part of the intestine of the blue shark (Prionace glauca). The larvae are found infesting the livers and muscles of ray-finned fishes such as the ocean sunfish (Mola mola), and the spot-fin porcupinefish (Diodon hystrix).

This tapeworm has been found parasitising sharks from France, the Mediterranean region, Brazil, Canada, India, Japan and New Zealand.
