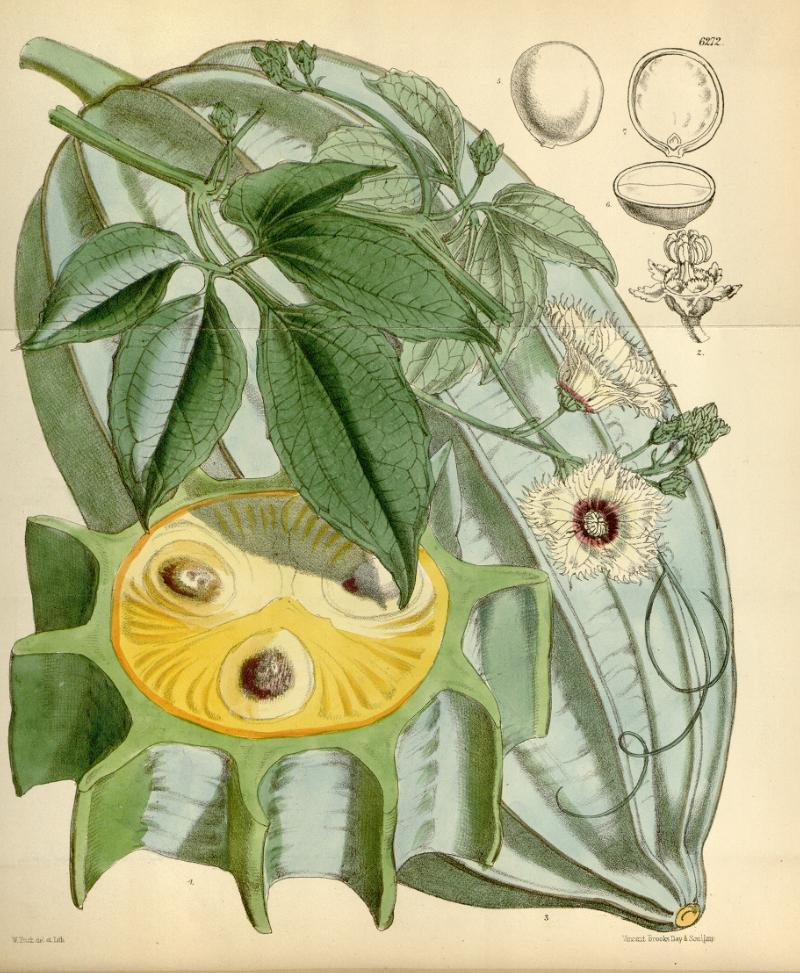
- T. occidentalis

Scientific classification
- Kingdom: Plantae
- Clade: Tracheophytes
- Clade: Angiosperms
- Clade: Eudicots
- Clade: Rosids
- Order: Cucurbitales
- Family: Cucurbitaceae
- Subfamily: Cucurbitoideae
- Tribe: Joliffieae
- Genus: Telfairia; Hook.

Type species
- Telfairia pedata (Sm.) Hook.

Species
- 3 - See text.

= Telfairia =

Genus of flowering plants

Telfairia is a small genus of flowering plants in the squash family which are native to Africa. They include Telfairia occidentalis, the fluted pumpkin, which is an important vegetable in Nigeria and other African nations. It is also known as the oyster nut, a common name it shares with its relative Telfairia pedata. These are woody and herbaceous dioecious vines which bear squashlike fruits that contain large, nutritious oily seeds. The third species is Telfairia batesii which is very rare and not cultivated.

These vines grow quickly to lengths of 30 meters or more, using tendrils to scale trees. T. pedata is grown as an ornamental plant for its attractive foliage. The seeds of T. occidentalis and T. pedata are over 25% protein and 55% oil, making them a good source of nutrition. They are used as a traditional food source for nursing mothers; the seed flour is fermented to make baby food; and the leaves and shoots, especially of T. occidentalis, are eaten as vegetables.

One recent concern has been the impact of telfairia mosaic virus, which, along with other problems, is a threat to the already low genetic diversity of plants of this genus.

Species:

- Telfairia batesii
- Telfairia occidentalis - fluted pumpkin, oyster nut
- Telfairia pedata (syn. T. africana, Fevillea pedata, Joliffia africana) - oyster nut, queen's nut, Zanzibar oil vine

The genus was named for Irish naturalist Charles Telfair (1778–1833).
