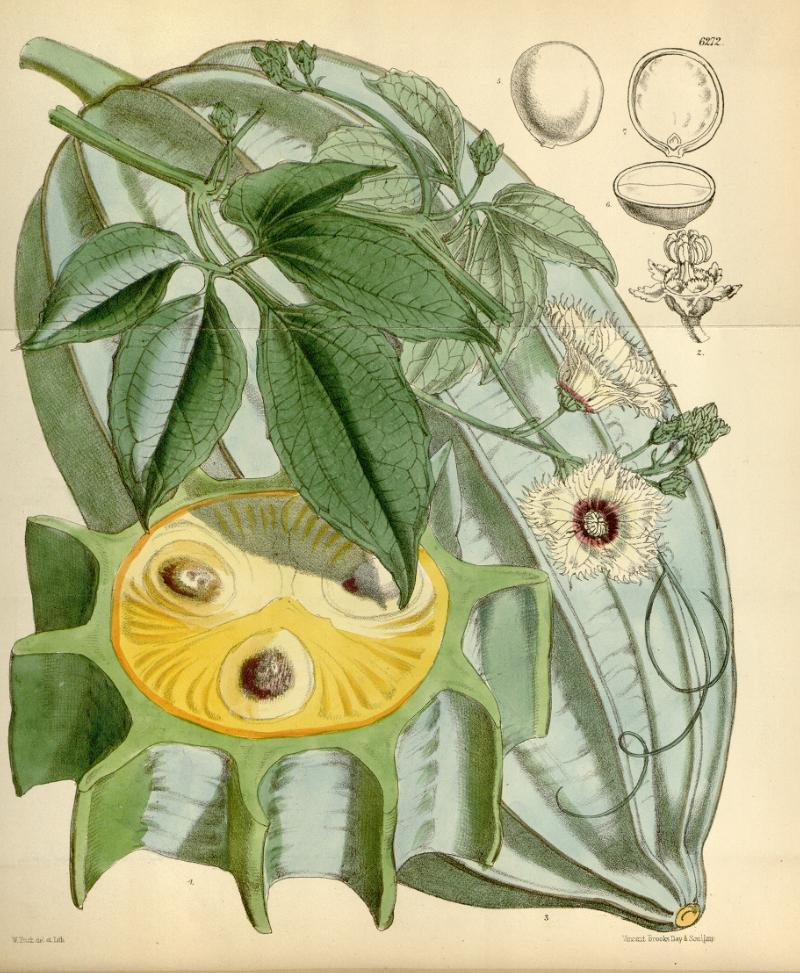
- Telfairia occidentalis, illustrated by Joseph Dalton Hooker, 1877

Scientific classification
- Kingdom: Plantae
- Clade: Embryophytes
- Clade: Tracheophytes
- Clade: Spermatophytes
- Clade: Angiosperms
- Clade: Eudicots
- Clade: Rosids
- Order: Cucurbitales
- Family: Cucurbitaceae
- Genus: Telfairia
- Species: T. occidentalis

Binomial name
- Telfairia occidentalis Hook.f.

= Telfairia occidentalis =

Species of flowering plant

Telfairia occidentalis is a tropical vine grown in West Africa as a leaf vegetable and for its edible seeds. Common names for the plant include fluted gourd, fluted pumpkin, ugu (in the Igbo language), ,' T. occidentalis is a member of the family Cucurbitaceae and is indigenous to southern Nigeria. The fluted gourd grows in many nations of West Africa, but is mainly cultivated in southeastern Nigeria and it is used primarily in soups and herbal medicines. Although the fruit is inedible, the seeds produced by the gourd are high in protein and fat, and can, therefore, contribute to a well-balanced diet. The plant is a drought-tolerant, dioecious perennial that is usually grown trellised.

T. occidentalis is traditionally used by an estimated 30 to 35 million people in Nigeria, including the Efik, Ibibio, Ikwerre, and Urhobo ethnic groups. However, it is predominantly used by the Igbo ethnic group, who continue to cultivate the gourd for food sources and traditional medicines. A recurring subject in the Igbo’s folklore, the fluted gourd is noted to have healing properties and was used as a blood tonic, to be administered to the weak or ill. It is endemic to southern Nigeria, and was an asset to international food trades of the Igbo ethnic group.

== Structure ==
The fluted gourd fruit is quite large; one study documented a range of 16–105 centimetres (6.3–41.3 in) in length, and an average of 9 cm in diameter. The same study found the seed count in larger gourds to reach upwards of 196 per fruit, typically measuring between 3.4 and 4.9 cm in length. In both the pistillate and staminate varieties, T. occidentalis flowers grow in sets of five, with creamy-white and dark red petals, contrasting with the light green colour of the fruit when young, and yellow when ripe. Dioecious flowering is most common in the fluted gourd, with very few documented cases of monoecious flowering

== Nutritional content ==
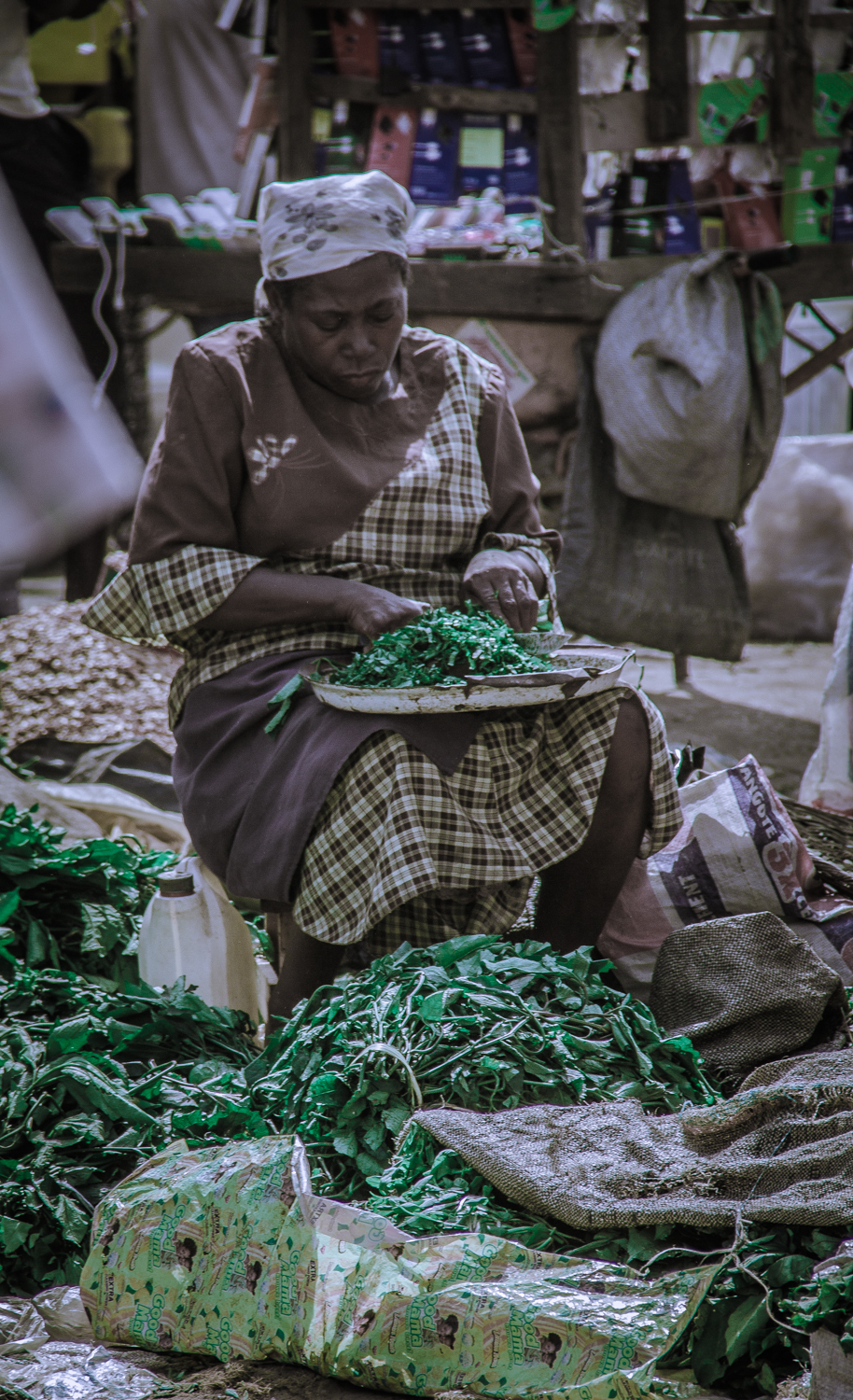
Woman of Nigeria chopping ugu leaves for soup.

Considered an “oil seed”, the fluted gourd is high in oil (30%). Shoots of T. occidentalis contain high levels of potassium and iron, while seeds are composed of 27% crude proteins and 53% fats. The leaves contain a high amount of antioxidants and hepatoprotective and antimicrobial properties.

The young shoots and leaves of the female plant are the main ingredients of a Nigerian soup, ofe egwusi. The large (up to 5 cm), dark-red seed is rich in fat and protein and can be eaten whole, ground into powder for a kind of soup, or made into a fermented porridge.

== Cultivation ==
T. occidentalis is typically grown vertically on trestle-like structures; however, it can be allowed to spread flat on a field. A beneficial outcome of growing the gourd flat is the suppression of weeds, especially when intercropped with a tall, upright plant such as maize. The growing period begins in April or May when seeds are planted; the first leaves and shoots can be harvested after a month and can be collected every 2–4 weeks thereafter. Seeds are planted directly in the soil, typically in groups of three to increase output in a case of a failed germination. Fruit is typically harvested between October and December. The seeds are subsequently collected and dried; a portion of them are consumed, while the remainder are stored for the following planting season. Although dependent upon soil type, the fluted gourd is able to ratoon and subsequently produce many flushes of fruit over long periods. It is able to ratoon with the highest degree of success in well-drained soils. It is propagated using the seeds. Its seed is housed in another greater covering or hard shell which protects it from harm. It survives drought and can retain its life in the root even after many years. It is a creeping plant and grows well if staked with bamboo sticks.

== Storage ==
Although the seeds of T. occidentalis store well, precautions must be taken when storing any portion of the plant, particularly if the gourd is to be stored whole. This is not a typical storage method, as the fluted gourd pod (the fruit itself) is highly perishable, and can only be stored up to 4 weeks. If the gourd is left intact and proper storage and shipping are not practiced, pod rot can manifest, even from small lesions, and cause serious damage to the entire fruit, rendering it unusable. Furthermore, care must be taken when storing the leaves, which rapidly lose nutritional and water content when stored improperly. These losses can be reduced by storing harvested leaves in sealed, polyethylene bags, as well as at lower temperatures (2-4 °C).

== Pests and pathogens ==
A major concern of buyers and sellers of fluted gourd is pod rot. Infection occurs most frequently during transport, although it can also arise before the plant is harvested, starting as a small lesion that creates an avenue for pathogens to penetrate the fruit. It is most common for the affected area to appear brown in colour, indicating contamination by R. stolonifer or Erwina. However, the infected area may also appear black (indicating the presence of Aspergillis niger) or grey (B. theobromae). Other symptoms associated with the presence of these pathogens include softening of the pod tissue accompanied by a pungent odour, or watery fluid in the fruit. Pod rot can be reduced by avoiding damage to the fruit during harvest and transport.

== Uses ==
The edible seeds can be boiled and eaten whole, or fermented and added to ogili. The fluted gourd has been traditionally used by indigenous tribes as a blood tonic, likely due to its high protein content. Flour produced from the seeds can be used for high-protein breads. Furthermore, the shoots and leaves can be consumed as vegetables, as Nigerians use it to make soup, stew, egg sauce and vegetable sauce. When T. occidentalis is prepared for herbal medicine, it is used to treat sudden attack of convulsion, malaria, and anaemia; it also plays a vital and protective role in cardiovascular diseases.
