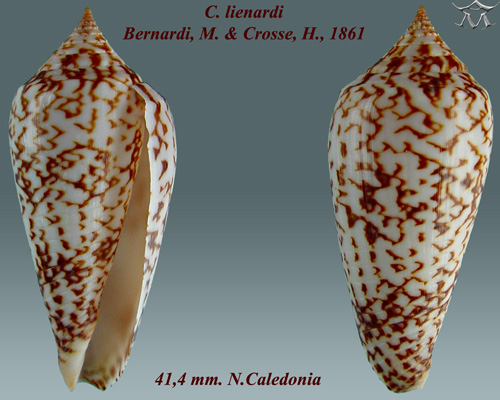
- Apertural and abapertural views of shell of Conus lienardi Bernardi, M. & Crosse, H., 1861

Scientific classification
- Kingdom: Animalia
- Phylum: Mollusca
- Class: Gastropoda
- Subclass: Caenogastropoda
- Order: Neogastropoda
- Superfamily: Conoidea
- Family: Conidae
- Genus: Conus
- Species: C. lienardi

Binomial name
- Conus lienardi Bernardi et Crosse, 1861

Synonyms
- Asprella lienardi (Bernardi & Crosse, 1861); Conus prevosti G. B. Sowerby III, 1881; Conus (Phasmoconus) lienardi Bernardi et Crosse, 1861 · accepted, alternate representation; Graphiconus lienardi (Bernardi & Crosse, 1861)

= Conus lienardi =

Species of sea snail

Conus lienardi or Lienard's cone is a species of sophisticated predatory sea snail, a marine gastropod mollusk in the family Conidae, the cone snails, cone shells or cones.

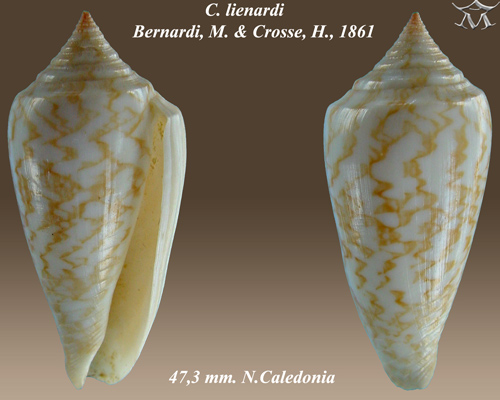
Conus lienardi Bernardi, M. & Crosse, H., 1861, showing variability of the species.

Like all species within the genus Conus, these snails are predatory and venomous. They are capable of stinging humans, therefore live ones should be handled carefully or not at all.

== Distribution ==
This is an Indo-Pacific species, occurring in Melanesia and off New Caledonia.

== Shell description ==
The size of the shell varies between 24 mm and 63 mm . The spire is raised, carinated and slightly striate. The body whorl is distantly grooved below. The color of the shell is yellowish brown, variously longitudinally covered with zigzag chestnut or chocolate markings; sometimes almost or quite covered with chocolate.

== Etymology ==
The specific name honours the French-Mauritian naturalist François Liénard de la Mivoye.
