= Neoniphon marianus =

Conservation status
- Least Concern (IUCN 3.1)

Scientific classification
- Kingdom: Animalia
- Phylum: Chordata
- Class: Actinopterygii
- Division: Teleostei
- Order: Beryciformes
- Family: Holocentridae
- Genus: Neoniphon
- Species: N. marianus

Binomial name
- Neoniphon marianus G. Cuvier, 1829
- range of Neoniphon marianus in blue

Species of fish

Neoniphon marianus, also known as the longjaw squirrelfish, is a species of squirrelfish found in the Western Atlantic Ocean from the Florida Keys south to Trinidad and throughout the Caribbean Sea. It lives near reefs at depths between 1 and 70 metres (3.3 and 229.7 ft), usually between 30 and 60 metres (98 and 197 ft), and can reach sizes of up to 18.0 centimetres (7.1 in) TL. It is nocturnal and consumes mostly shrimps, but will also eat crabs.

== Gallery ==
At Grand Cayman

At Grand Cayman

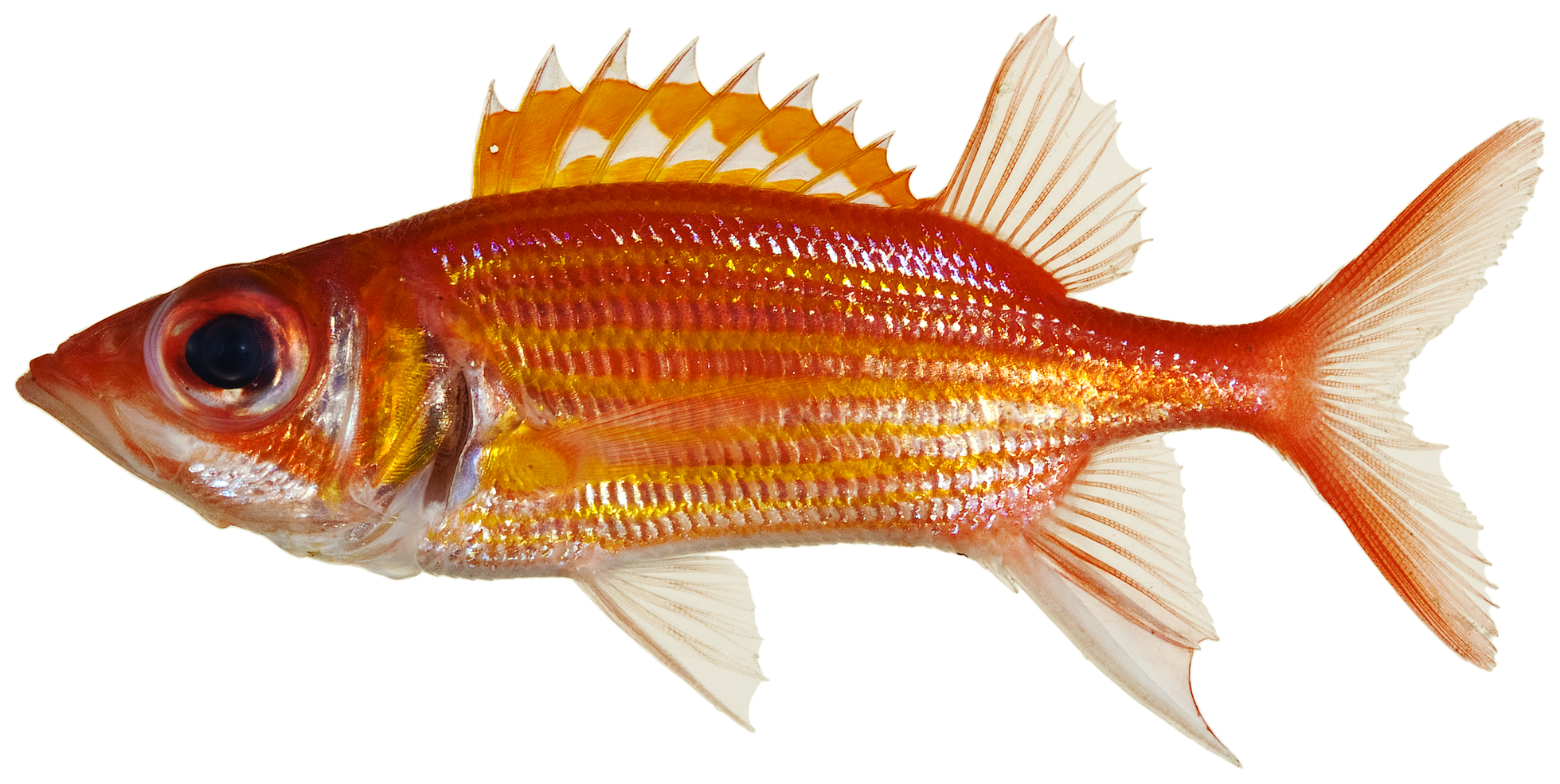
