= Neoniphon vexillarius =

- In Cuba

Conservation status
- Least Concern (IUCN 3.1)

Scientific classification
- Kingdom: Animalia
- Phylum: Chordata
- Class: Actinopterygii
- Division: Teleostei
- Order: Beryciformes
- Family: Holocentridae
- Genus: Neoniphon
- Species: N. vexillarius

Binomial name
- Neoniphon vexillarius Poey, 1860
- Neoniphon vexillarius range in blue

Synonyms
- List: Adioryx vexillarius (Poey, 1860); Holocentrum vexillarium Poey, 1860 [lapsus]; Holocentrus vexillarius Poey, 1860; Neoniphon vexillarium (Poey, 1860); Sargocentron vexillarium (Poey, 1860); Sargocentron vexillarius (Poey, 1860) [lapsus]

Species of fish

Neoniphon vexillarius is a species of fish in the family Holocentridae
