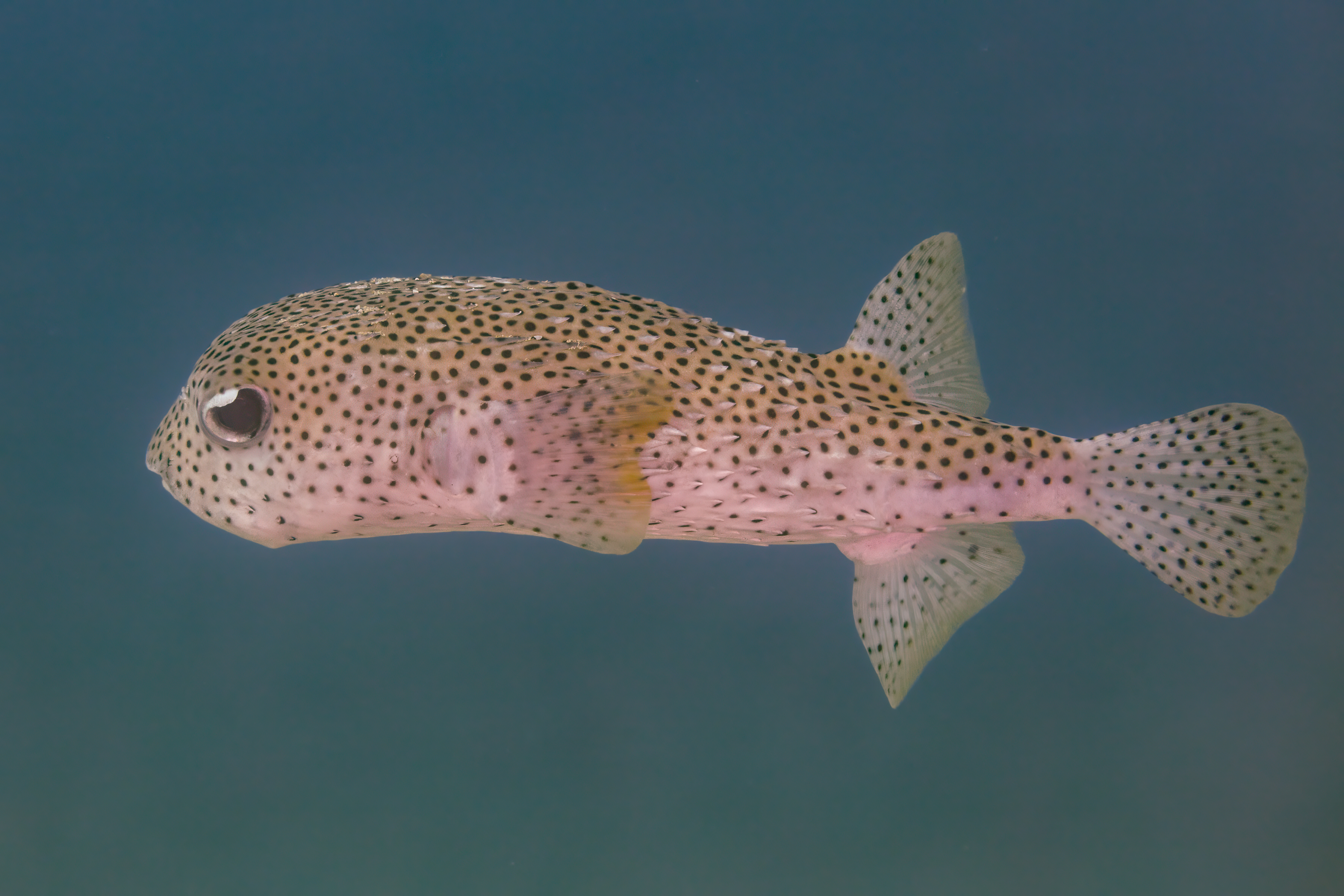
- In the Gulf of California

Conservation status
- Least Concern (IUCN 3.1)

Scientific classification
- Kingdom: Animalia
- Phylum: Chordata
- Class: Actinopterygii
- Division: Teleostei
- Order: Tetraodontiformes
- Family: Diodontidae
- Genus: Diodon
- Species: D. hystrix

Binomial name
- Diodon hystrix Linnaeus, 1758

= Spot-fin porcupinefish =

Species of fish

The spot-fin porcupinefish (Diodon hystrix), also known as the spotted porcupinefish, black-spotted porcupinefish or simply porcupinefish, is a member of the family Diodontidae.

== Distribution and habitat ==
The porcupinefish is circumglobal, found in tropical and subtropical waters. It has been recorded twice in the Mediterranean Sea, off southern Italy (1963) and the Balearic islands (2016).

Juveniles are pelagic until they are about 20 cm in length. Adults favour lagoons, top reefs, and seaward coral or rocky reefs from one to 50 m depth, sheltering under ledges or in caves during the day.

== Description ==
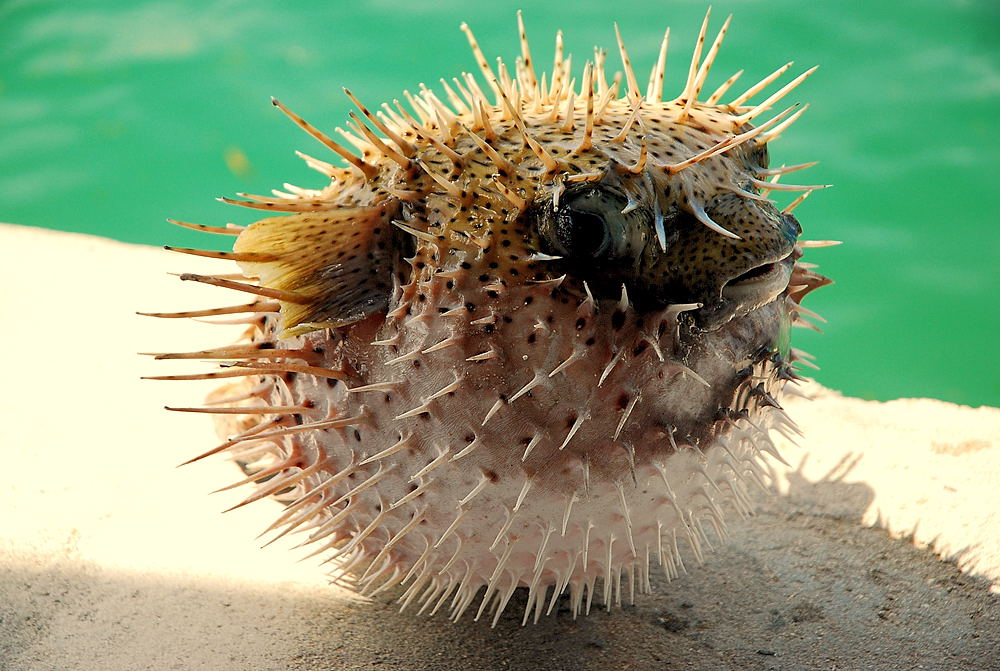
Inflated

The spot-fin porcupinefish is a medium-sized fish which grows up to 91 cm, but the typical size mostly observed is 40 cm. Its body is elongated with a spherical head with big round protruding eyes, and a large mouth that is rarely closed. The pectoral fins are large, the pelvic fins are absent, and the anal and dorsal fins are close to the caudal peduncle. The latter move simultaneously during swimming. The skin is smooth and firm; the scales are modified into spines. The body coloration is beige to sandy-yellow marbled with dark blotches and dotted with numerous small, black spots.

== Biology ==
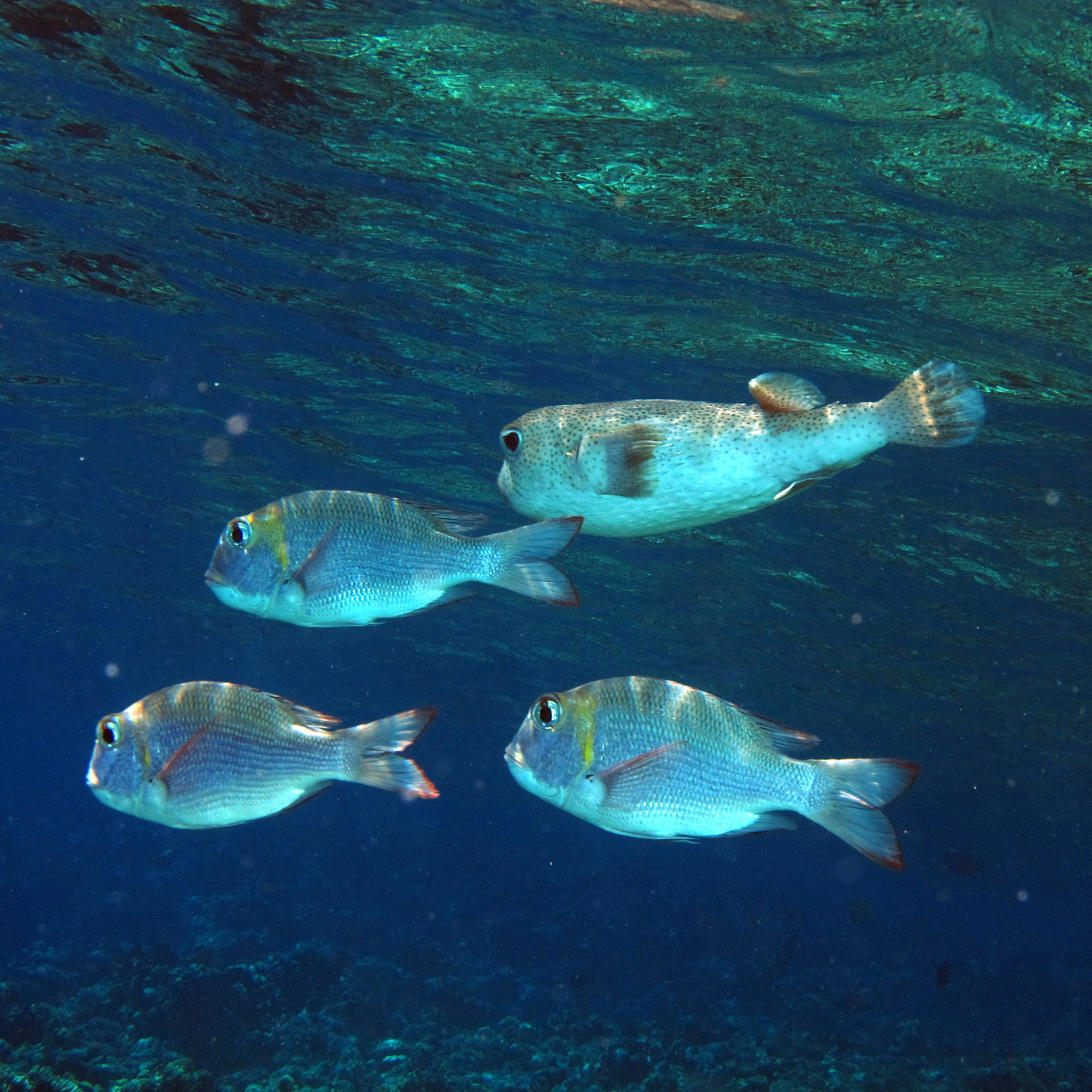
Schooling with humpnose big-eye bream, in the Red Sea

In case of danger, the porcupinefish can inflate itself by swallowing water to deter the potential predator with its larger volume, and it can raise its spines.

This fish is solitary, except during mating periods, and it has a nocturnal activity with a maximal activity at sunset and sunrise.

The porcupinefish concentrates tetrodotoxin in certain parts of its body such as the liver, skin, gonads, and the viscera. This defensive system constitutes an additional device to dissuade potential predators.

=== Diet ===
The porcupinefish's diet is based on sea urchins, gastropods, clams, and crustaceans.

=== Parasites ===
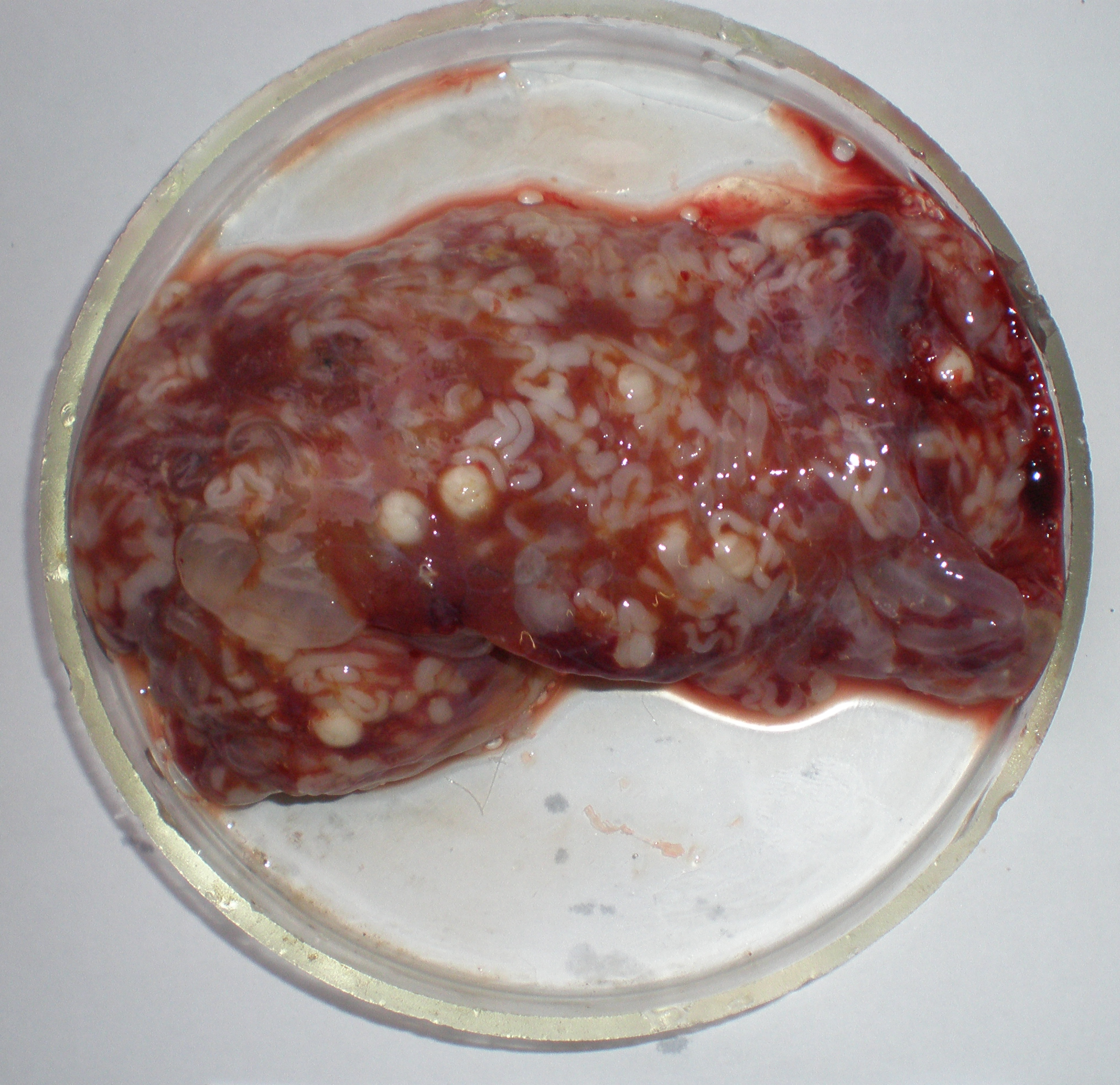
Molicola horridus cysts in the liver of D. hystrix

As with most fish, the porcupinefish is infected by a variety of parasites. Spectacular parasites are the cysts of the larvae of the trypanorhynch cestode Molicola horridus, often found in great numbers in the liver. These parasites represent no danger to humans.

== Gallery ==
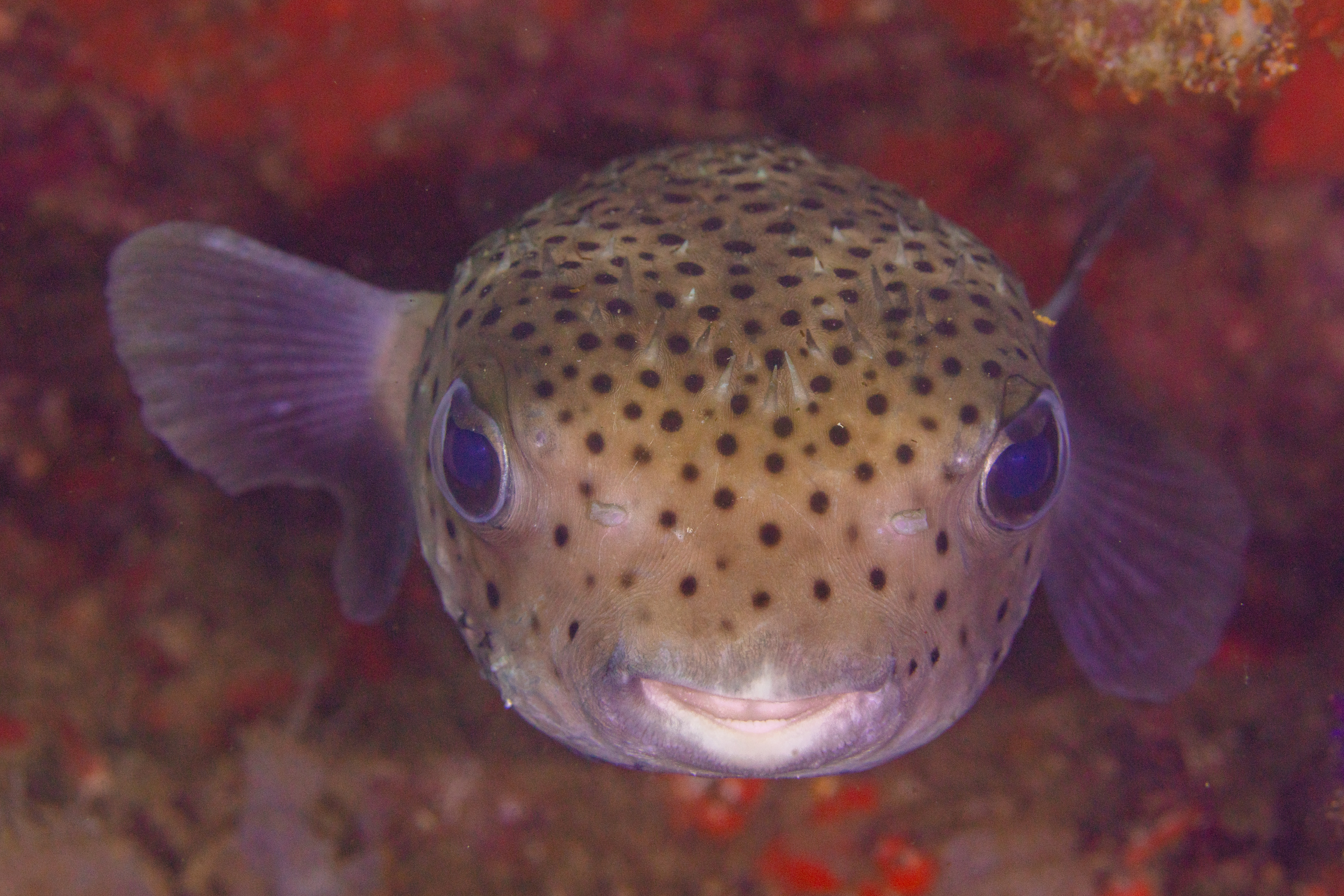
In the Gulf of Oman

In Indonesia

In an aquarium
