= Charles Telfair =

Irish botanist (1778–1833)

Charles Edward Telfair
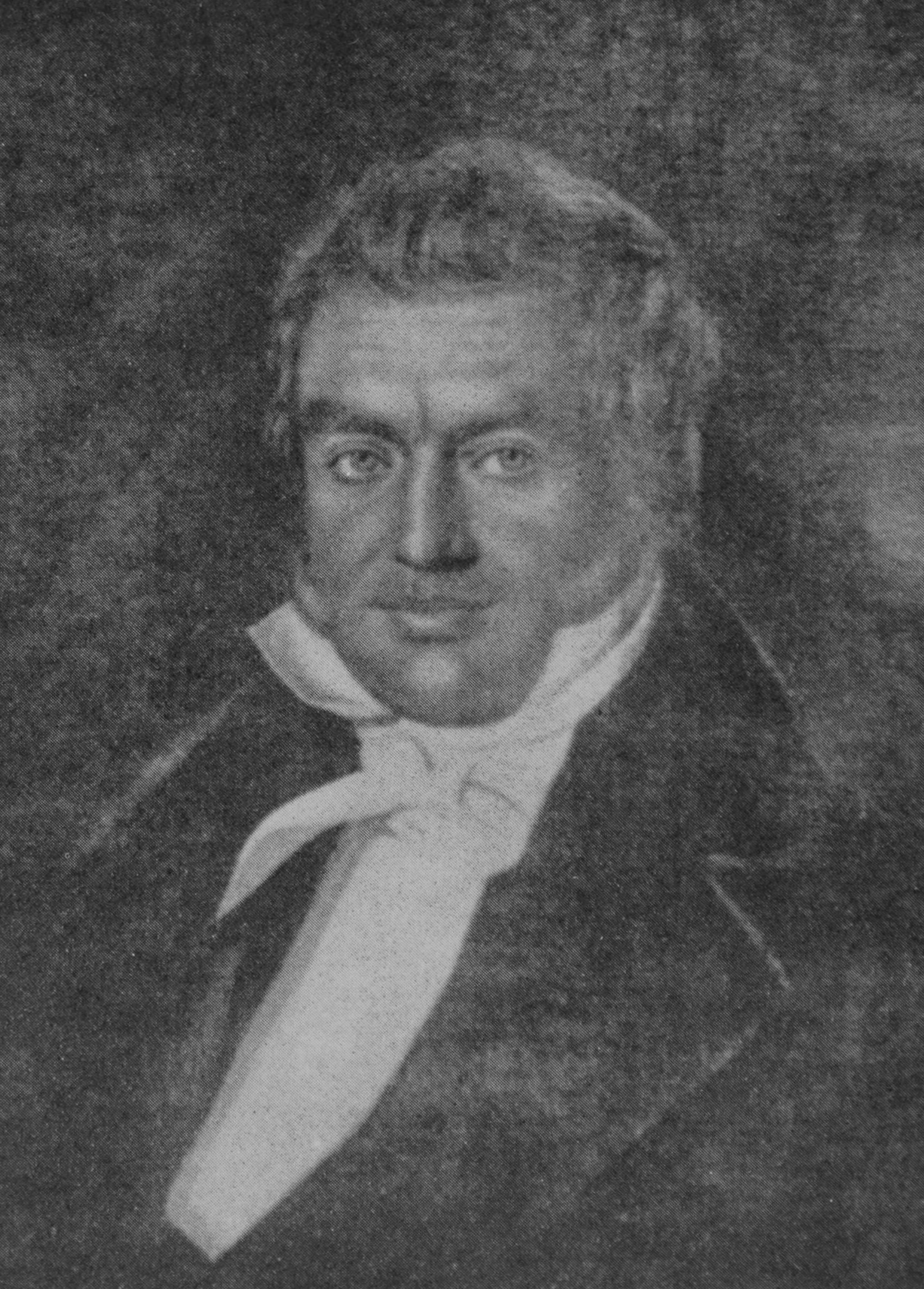
- Born: 1778; Belfast, Ireland
- Died: July 14, 1833; Port Louis, Mauritius
- Known for: Introduction of Cavendish banana to England; Co-founding Société d'Histoire Naturelle de l'Ile Maurice; Honorary curator, Pamplemousses Botanical Garden
- Spouse: Annabella Chamberlain (m. 1818)
- Awards: Légion d'honneur (1819)
- Scientific career
- Fields: Botany, Medicine
- Institutions: Royal Navy; Pamplemousses Botanical Garden
- Author abbrev. (botany): Telfair

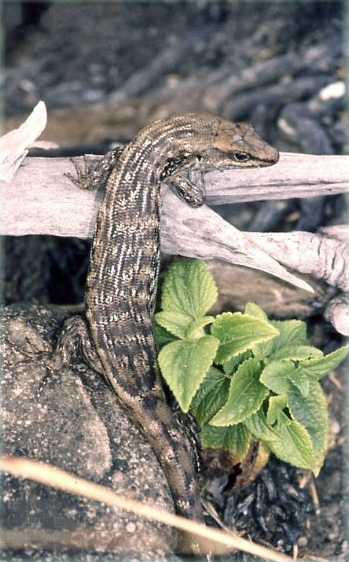
Leiolopisma telfairii, Telfair's skink or Round Island skink

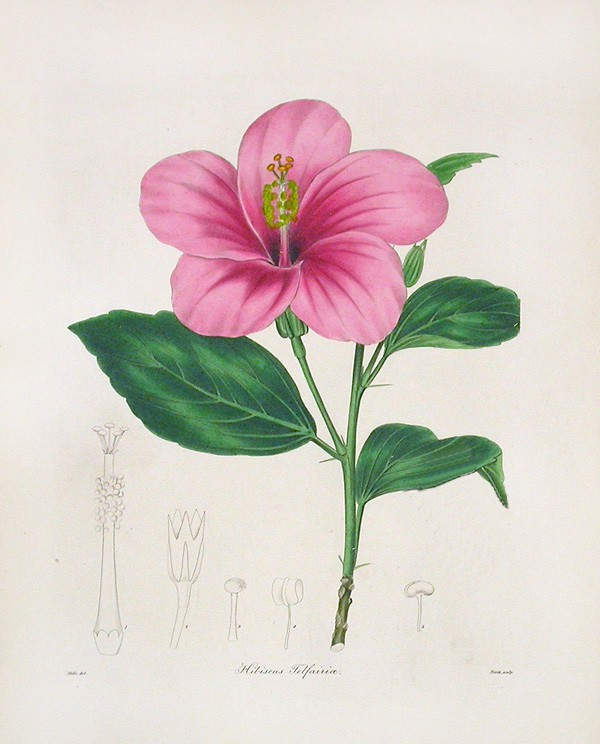
Hibiscus telfairia

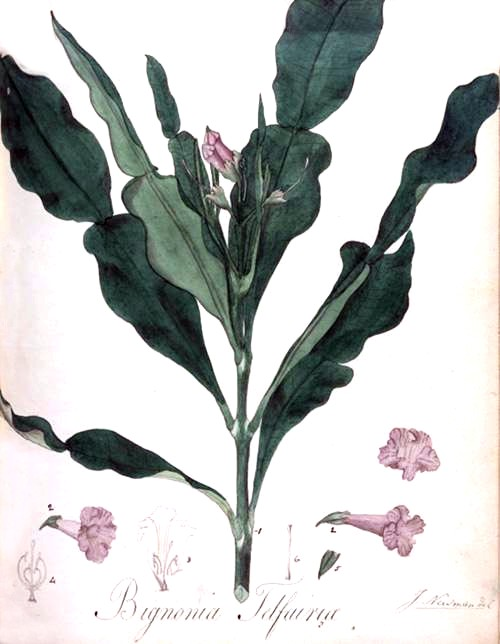
Bignonia telfairia

Charles Edward Telfair (1778 in Belfast – 14 July 1833 in Port Louis) was an Irish botanist.

== Early life and career ==
Telfair was the son of a Belfast schoolmaster. He studied chemistry under Joseph Black and later qualified as a medical doctor. In 1797 he joined the Royal Navy and was soon appointed as ship's surgeon, visiting Mauritius and Réunion with the Navy in 1810. He returned to Mauritius in 1816 and established botanical gardens in Mauritius and Réunion. Having worked in several Government offices in Réunion, he was appointed personal secretary of Mauritius Governor Robert Farquhar. Telfair improved the education and housing of estate slaves, and found less strenuous occupations for elderly slaves. He was honorary curator of the botanical garden at Pamplemousses from 1826 to 1829. His old colonial château has now been turned into a restaurant, with watercolours of local flora painted by Telfair’s wife Annabella Chamberlain adorning the walls.

The Charles Telfair Institute in Mauritius, formerly known as DCDM Business School, was renamed after Charles Telfair.

== Botanical interests ==
A number of naturalists were actively collecting in Mauritius in the early 19th century. In 1826 Telfair persuaded two local collectors, Julien Desjardins and Louis Bouton, to donate their collections to form the nucleus of a proposed colonial museum. As this offer met with no response from the Governor, Telfair, together with Bouton, Desjardins, Wenceslas Bojer, François Liénard and other local naturalists convened an 1829 meeting at which the Société d’Histoire Naturelle de l’Ile Maurice was founded. Desjardins, who had already set up his own museum at Argy in the Flacq district, left for Paris in 1839, intending to write a natural history of Mauritius, but unexpectedly died there in 1840. His widow donated his entire collection to the Society. Bouton, inspired by the gesture, added his collection of plants, and Adrien d'Épinay his library. The nascent museum opened to the public in 1842 as the Muséum Desjardins, in Port Louis, with Bojer acting as the first curator. The Mauritius government provided the accommodation, and half the curator's and taxidermist's salaries.

Telfair is credited with having introduced bananas to Mauritius from China in 1826. Three years later he sent the plants to England where a Mr Barclay of Burryhill showed them to Lord Cavendish, the 6th Duke of Devonshire, whence came the Cavendish banana. Joseph Paxton, his head gardener, cultivated the plants successfully in greenhouses.

He is commemorated by the plant genus Telfairia, the lizard species Leiolopisma telfairii (Telfair's skink), and the mammal species Echinops telfairi (lesser hedgehog tenrec).

In 1819 Telfair was made a member of the Légion d'honneur in recognition of his services.

From 1825 to 1848, John Newman was head of the Royal Botanic Garden at Pamplemousses. He regularly corresponded and exchanged specimens with notable figures in the botanical world, including William Jackson Hooker. The gardens displayed plants from Madagascar, Australia, the East Indies, China and South Africa. Some of these plants were illustrated in a report from Newman to the Colonial Office in 1829, including Bignonia telfairia from Madagascar. Newman named it after Annabella Telfair (d. 23 May 1832 Port Louis), a botanical artist, plant collector and wife of Charles Telfair, whom she had married in 1818. Some of her illustrations appeared in Curtis's Botanical Magazine between 1826 and 1830, while her letters to Hooker are preserved at Kew. Telfair's collections were donated to the Zoological Society of London, but were dispersed and effectively lost when sold in 1855.

== Publications ==
- From Belfast to Mauritius: Charles Telfair (1778–1833): Naturalist and Product of the Irish Enlightenment in Eighteenth-Century Ireland
- Michel, L. 1935. Conference sur Charles Telfair. Trans. Royal Society of Arts & Sciences of Mauritius C3 :19-48.
