= Leiolopisma alazon =

Conservation status
- Critically Endangered (IUCN 3.1)

Scientific classification
- Kingdom: Animalia
- Phylum: Chordata
- Class: Reptilia
- Order: Squamata
- Suborder: Scinciformata
- Infraorder: Scincomorpha
- Family: Eugongylidae
- Genus: Leiolopisma
- Species: L. alazon

Binomial name
- Leiolopisma alazon Zug, 1985

Species of lizard

Leiolopisma alazon, also known as the Lauan ground skink or Ono-i-Lau ground skink, is a species of skink found on Lau Islands of Fiji. The species is currently critically endangered due to a rise of the yellow crazy ant and rats on the islands.
