= Otobothriidae =

Scientific classification
- Kingdom: Animalia
- Phylum: Platyhelminthes
- Class: Cestoda
- Order: Trypanorhyncha
- Suborder: Cystidea
- Family: Otobothriidae; Dollfus, 1942

Family of flatworms

Otobothriidae is a family of tapeworms described by Robert-Philippe Dollfus in 1942.

== Genera ==
- Diplootobothrium
- Fossobothrium
- Otobothrium
- Poecilancistrium
- Pristiorhynchus
- Proemotobothrium
- Symbothriorhynchus
