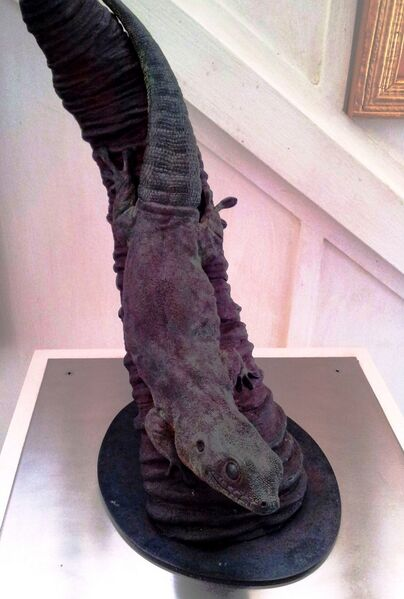

Conservation status
- Extinct (1841) (IUCN 3.1)

Scientific classification
- Kingdom: Animalia
- Phylum: Chordata
- Class: Reptilia
- Order: Squamata
- Suborder: Gekkota
- Family: Gekkonidae
- Genus: Phelsuma
- Species: †P. gigas

Binomial name
- †Phelsuma gigas (Liénard, 1842)

Synonyms
- Gecko gigas Liénard, 1842; Gekko newtoni Günther, 1877; Phelsuma gigas — Kluge, 1993

= Rodrigues giant day gecko =

Extinct species of lizard

The Rodrigues giant day gecko (Phelsuma gigas) is an extinct species of day gecko. It lived on the island of Rodrigues and surrounding islands and typically dwelt on trees. The Rodrigues giant day gecko fed on insects and nectar, and, unlike most other day geckos, was apparently nocturnal in habit.

== Description ==
Phelsuma gigas was one of the largest known geckos. It reached a total length of about 40 centimetres (16 in). The body colour was grayish or grayish brown. On the back there were irregular black spottings. The tail had some striping and was charcoal- or dark grey-coloured. The tongue had a pink colour and the ventral side of the body was light yellow. The original collected specimens that were used to describe this species have been lost. Today, only a few portions of some skeletons remain.

== Behaviour ==
Leguat described the species:

There's another sort of nocturnal lizard of grayish colour, and (very) ugly; they are as big and as long as one's arm, their flesh is not bad, they love (being on) plantanes (latan palms).

== Distribution ==
This species inhabited Rodrigues and surrounding islands. P. gigas was last collected in 1842 on the offshore islet of Ile aux Fregates.

== Habitat ==
P. gigas was an arboreal lizard living on trees within the forests of Rodrigues. P. gigas became extinct due to human-induced deforestation and predation by introduced cats and rats.

== Diet ==
These day geckos fed on various insects and other invertebrates. As observed in other species of day geckos, it was assumed that P. gigas also liked to lick at soft, sweet fruit, pollen and nectar.
