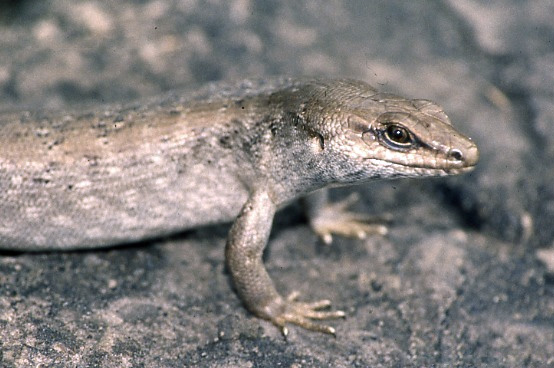
- Leiolopisma telfairii

Scientific classification
- Kingdom: Animalia
- Phylum: Chordata
- Class: Reptilia
- Order: Squamata
- Suborder: Scinciformata
- Infraorder: Scincomorpha
- Family: Eugongylidae
- Genus: Leiolopisma; Duméril & Bibron, 1839

Species
- see text

Synonyms
- Didosaurus

= Leiolopisma =

Genus of lizards

Leiolopisma is a genus of skinks. Most species occur in the region of New Caledonia-New Zealand, and they are related to other genera from that general area, such as Emoia; these and others form the Eugongylus group. One living and two extinct taxa represent a clade endemic to the Mascarenes.(Austin & Arnold 2006)

== Species ==
- Leiolopisma alazon Zug, 1985 - Lauan ground skink, Ono-i-Lau ground skink
- Leiolopisma ceciliae Arnold & Bour, 2008 - extinct - Réunion giant skink
- Leiolopisma mauritiana (Günther, 1877) - extinct - Mauritian giant skink
- Leiolopisma telfairii (Desjardin, 1831) - Round Island ground skink

The Mauritian giant skink (Leiolopisma mauritiana) and the Réunion giant skink (Leiolopisma ceciliae) were closely related. These two were formerly separated in Didosaurus. David Day (1979), in Vanished Species, described the Reunion giant skink as small and fast moving but completely unafraid of humans. Individuals would climb on observer's legs. Efforts to maintain the species in captivity proved futile. The Reunion giant skink was reported to be completely insectivorous.
