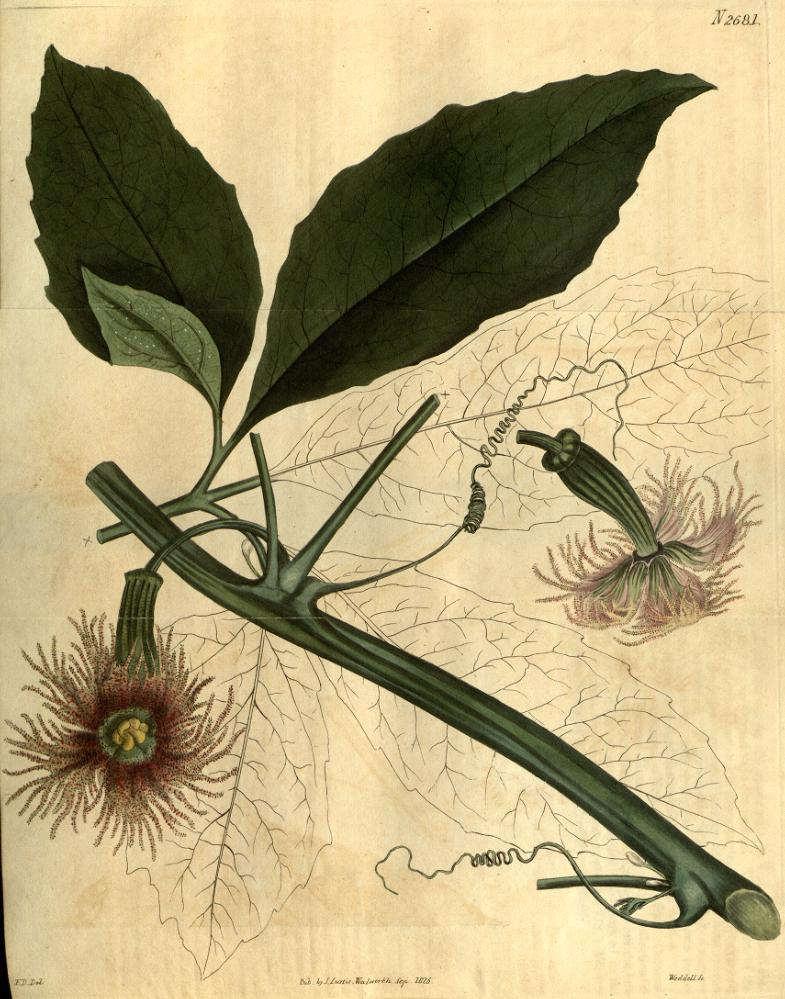
- T. pedata female flower
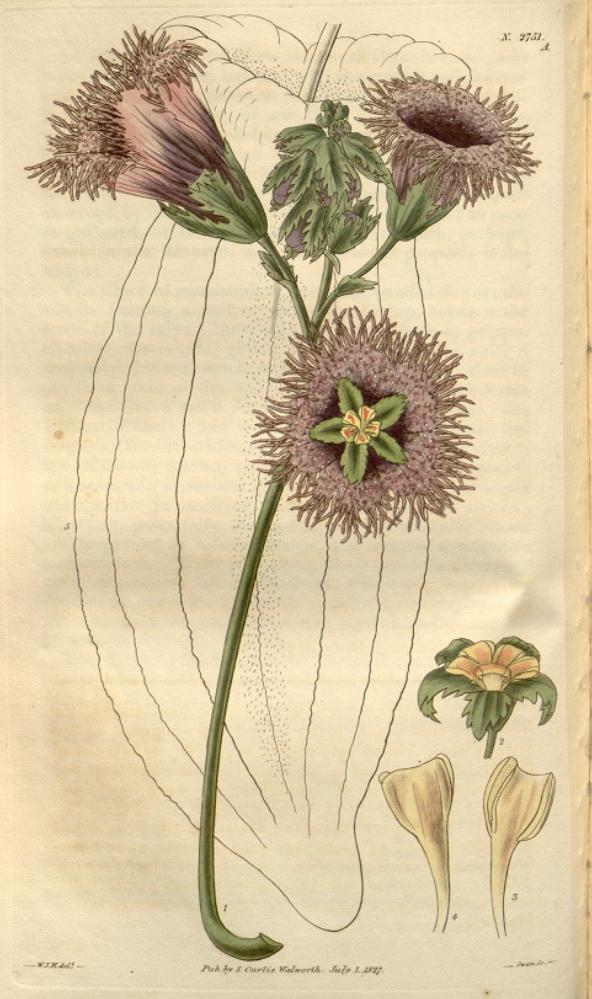
- T. pedata male flower

Scientific classification
- Kingdom: Plantae
- Clade: Tracheophytes
- Clade: Angiosperms
- Clade: Eudicots
- Clade: Rosids
- Order: Cucurbitales
- Family: Cucurbitaceae
- Genus: Telfairia
- Species: T. pedata

Binomial name
- Telfairia pedata (Sm. ex Sims) Hook.

Synonyms
- Fevillea pedata Sm. ex Sims (basionym); Joliffia africana Bojer ex Delile

= Telfairia pedata =

Oysternut

Species of fruit and plant

Telfairia pedata, commonly known as oysternut (alternately spelled as 'oyster nut', etc.), queen's nut, Zanzibar oilvine (alternately spelled as 'oil vine', etc.), kweme or kulekula, is a dioecious African liana which can grow up to 30 metres long, having purple-pink fringed flowers, and very large (30–90 cm × 15–25 cm), many-seeded, drooping, ellipsoid berries which can weigh up to 15 kg (though one old source from 1882 claimed up to 60 lbs). It is valuable for having edible fruit, seeds and oil.

== Propagation ==
Propagation is by seed which are black to brown-red, recalcitrant (i.e., killed by drying) and vary from 1g to 68g, with the smaller ones tending to have greater viability. They cannot survive desiccation and fungi are the main cause of seed loss.

== Habitat ==
Telfairia pedata is found in high-precipitation tropical locales, in coastal and riverine forest lowlands. It was also reported to grow in elevations between 900 and 1800 m above sea level with annual rainfall of 1000 to 1400 mm.

In Tanzania, 280 trees species were found to be hosts of T. pedal, with three tree species being most common hosts; Albizia schimperiana, Persea americana and Croton macrostaychs. Other common host trees for the climber were Artocarpus heterophyllus, Cordia africana, Terminalia superba, Ficus sur, Rauvolfia afra, Ficus thonningii and Mangifera indica.

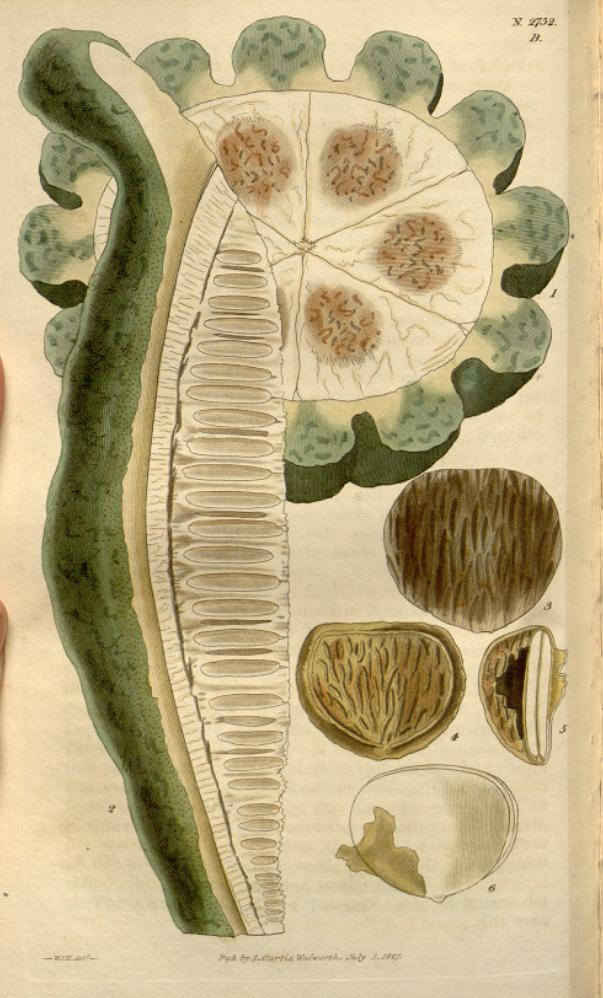
T. pedata fruit

== Distribution ==
Telfairia pedata is native to Tanzania (including the Zanzibar Archipelago) and northern Mozambique. It is also cultivated as a crop plant in Angola, Ethiopia, Kenya, Madagascar, Malawi, Mauritius, Mozambique, Nigeria, Rwanda, South Africa, Uganda, and Zambia. In Tanzania the crop grows on both lowland coastal areas as well as highland areas of the Northern corridor of the country, commonly found on the slopes of Meru and Kilimanjaro mountains.

T. pedata is retorted to be found in high abundance in higher altitudes of more than 1500 masl up to 2000 masl and in areas of higher rainfall similar to another Telfairia species T.occidentalis.

== Uses ==
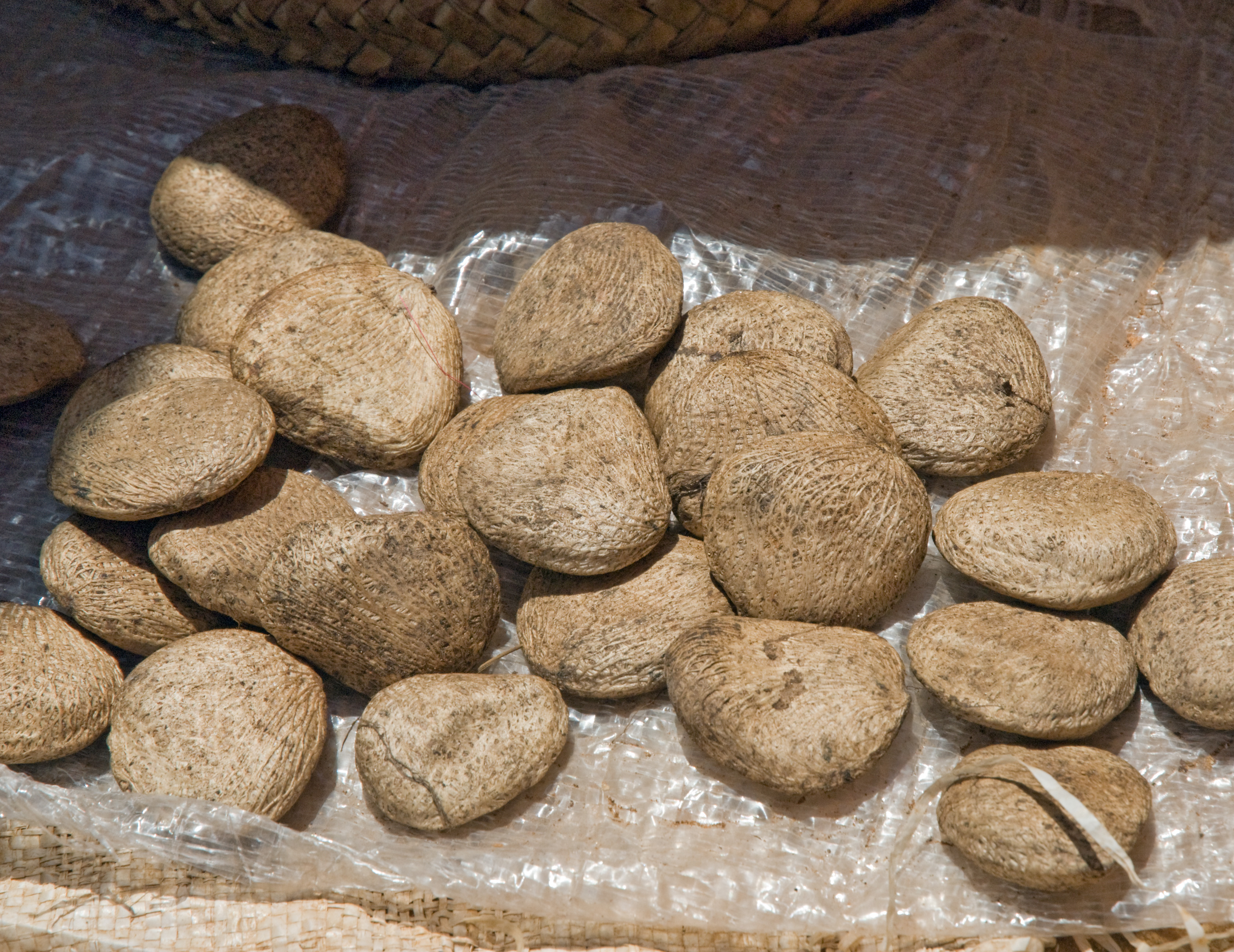
Seeds of Telfairia pedata ('oysternuts') for sale on a market in the West Usambara Mountains of Tanzania (January 2014)

The fruits of Telfairia pedata are edible, but the principal value is found in the seeds (or "nuts") and the seeds' oil. The flavourful seeds are prepared in various culinary ways (cooked, roasted, pickled, etc.), but can also be eaten raw, and are given to nursing mothers to facilitate milk production. The versatile, mildly sweet oil from the seeds (marketed as ‘oyster-nut oil’ or ‘koémé de Zanzibar’) is used in cooking, cosmetics, soap and candle-making, and as a gastric and anti-rheumatism medicine; it is believed, by Chaga people of Tanzania, to be beneficial to give a tonic made from the seeds to women who have just given birth. It common known as Makungu in Pare mountains where Pare people eat them fresh and sometimes roast to eat alone or cook with other food. The left-over cake of seeds from oil pressing is rich in fat and protein, and used as livestock fodder.

=== Fatty acids ===
The fatty acids which are found in the oil are here broken down by their average percentages:

- linoleic acid 32.5%
- palmitic acid 24.5%
- stearic acid 18%
- oleic acid 11.5%
- linolenic acid 5%

List source :

== Pests ==
Historically, few pests seem to negatively affect Telfairia pedata very seriously; an exception is the pentatomid shield bug (Piezosternum calidum), which has been known to ruin crops growing in Uganda. Other, more equal-opportunity pests may include Heterodera spp. of root-eating cyst nematodes; and insects, such as grasshoppers and termites, which can devour the entire above-ground portions of plants during a swarm.

Vines cultivated in Costa Rica have been attacked by borers in the main stem, which can be serious, and even kill the vines.
