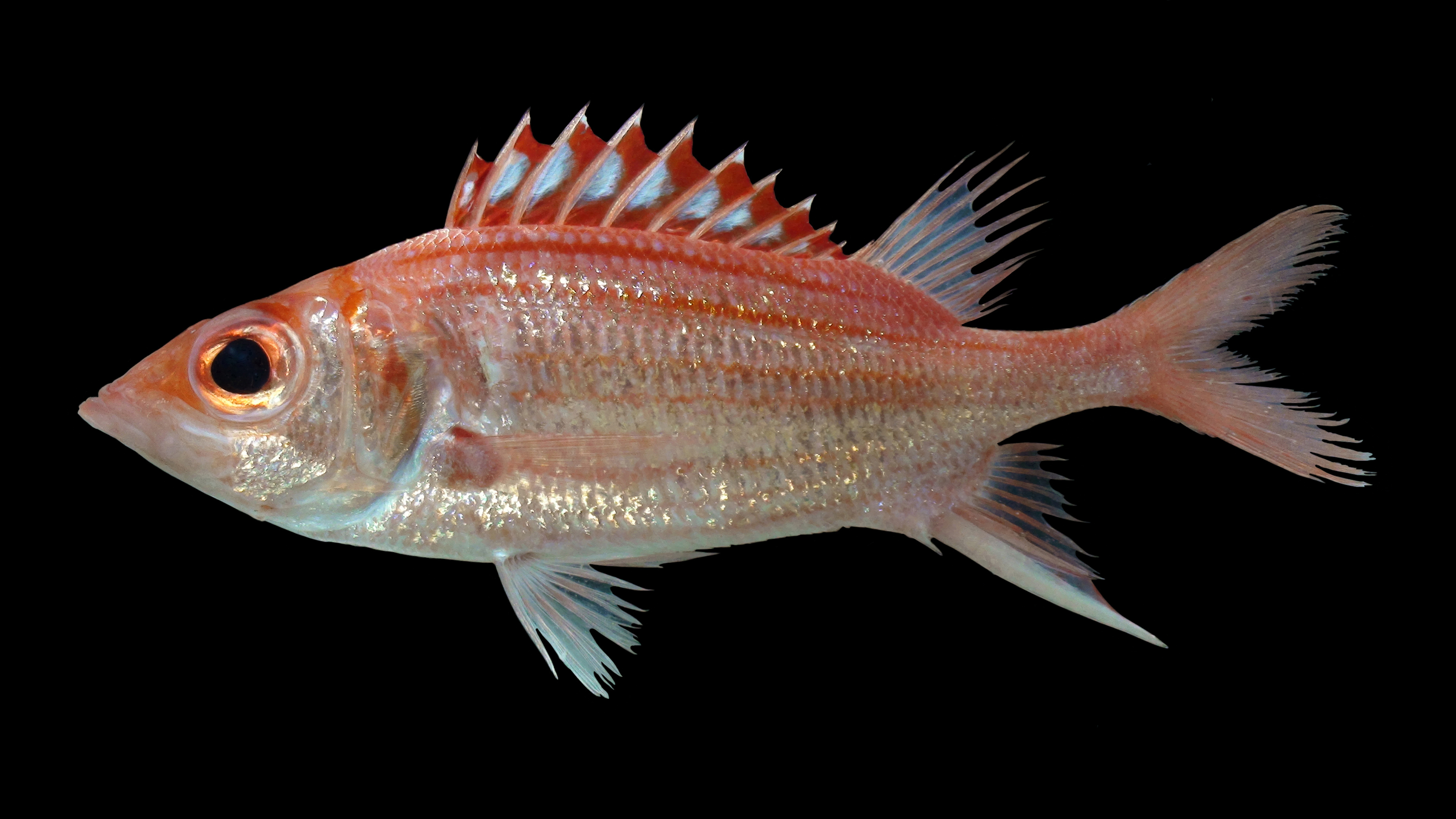

Scientific classification
- Kingdom: Animalia
- Phylum: Chordata
- Class: Actinopterygii
- Order: Beryciformes
- Family: Holocentridae
- Genus: Neoniphon
- Species: N. pencei

Binomial name
- Neoniphon pencei Copus, Pyle & Earle, 2015

= Neoniphon pencei =

Species of fish

Neoniphon pencei, or Pence's squirrelfish, is a species of squirrelfish found in the Pacific Ocean in Rarotonga, Cook Islands and Mo'orea, French Polynesia. It differs from other species of the genus Neoniphon in number of lateral line scales, scales above and below lateral line, elements of life colour, and in COI and cytochrome b DNA sequences.

== Etymology ==
The fish is named in honor of David F. Pence, the Dive Safety Officer for the University of Hawaiʻi, and a member of the deep-diving team that not only discovered this species, but was able to collect the type specimens.
