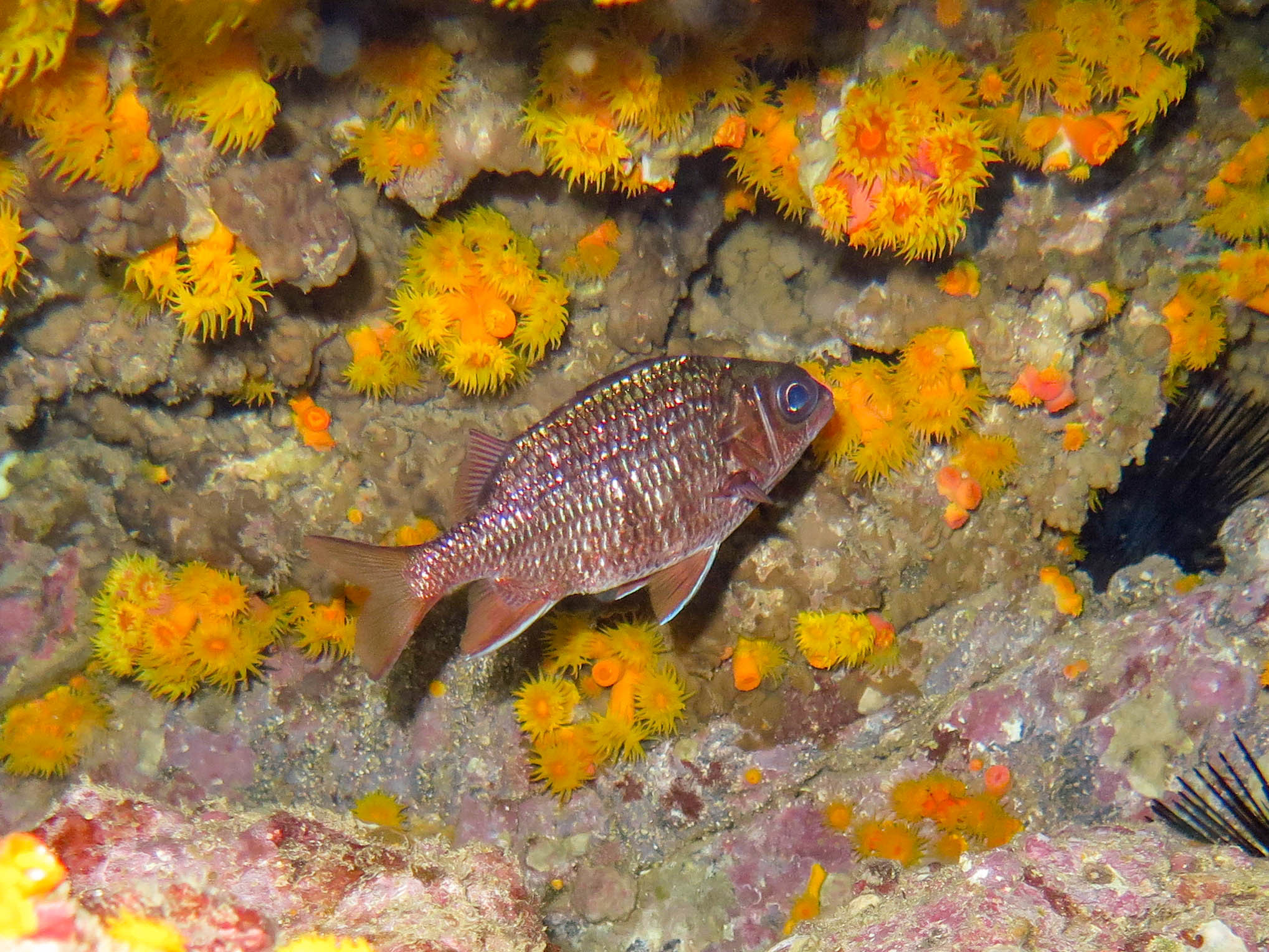

Conservation status
- Least Concern (IUCN 3.1)

Scientific classification
- Kingdom: Animalia
- Phylum: Chordata
- Class: Actinopterygii
- Order: Beryciformes
- Family: Holocentridae
- Genus: Sargocentron
- Species: S. suborbitale

Binomial name
- Sargocentron suborbitale (T. N. Gill,1863)

Synonyms
- Holocentrum suborbitale T. N. Gill, 1863; Holocentrum suborbitalis T. N. Gill, 1863; Sargocentron suborbitalis (T. N. Gill, 1863); Neoniphon suborbitalis (T. N. Gill, 1863)

= Sargocentron suborbitale =

Species of Fish

Sargocentron suborbitale, the tinsel squirrelfish, is a species of squirrelfish belonging to the genus Sargocentron. It can be found in the East Pacific Ocean from the Gulf of California to Ecuador including the Galapagos Islands. During the day, adults of the species hide in small caves or crevices of rocks. During the night, they feed on small crustaceans in the intertidal zone. It is oviparous.
