= Neoniphon sammara =

- In Kenya

Conservation status
- Least Concern (IUCN 3.1)

Scientific classification
- Kingdom: Animalia
- Phylum: Chordata
- Class: Actinopterygii
- Division: Teleostei
- Order: Beryciformes
- Family: Holocentridae
- Genus: Neoniphon
- Species: N. sammara

Binomial name
- Neoniphon sammara (Forsskål, 1775)

Synonyms
- Sciaena sammara Forsskål, 1775

Species of fish

Neoniphon sammara, the sammara squirrelfish, also known as the blood-spot squirrelfish, slender squirrelfish, spotfin squirrelfish, armed squirrel-fish or javelin squirrelfish, is a species squirrelfish found in Indo-Pacific.

== Distribution ==
This Indo-Pacific species is distributed from the east coast of Africa eastwards to the Marquesan Islands. It is found as far north as Japan and as far south as Lord Howe Island. It is also found in the Red Sea

== Biology ==
In Madagascar

It feeds on shrimps and small crabs and fish at night and can grow up to 32.0 centimetres (12.6 in) TL in length, though its common length is only 23.0 centimetres (9.1 in) TL. Like N. opercularis, it has a venomous spine on its preopercle.

== Habitat ==
Neoniphon sammara lives alone or in small groups on seagrass beds and hard substrates in reef flats and lagoons. It can be found at depths between 0 and 46 metres (0 and 151 ft). Of its genus, it is the most likely to be found in shallow waters and it is often associated with Acropora corals, which it will use as shelter during the day.

== Commercial use ==
Neoniphon sammara is not a commonly-eaten fish, but is common in the Indian aquarium trade. It can also be used as bait for tuna fisheries.

== Gallery ==
Schooling

In Queensland, Australia

In Indonesia

In the Red Sea

In the Red Sea

In the Red Sea
