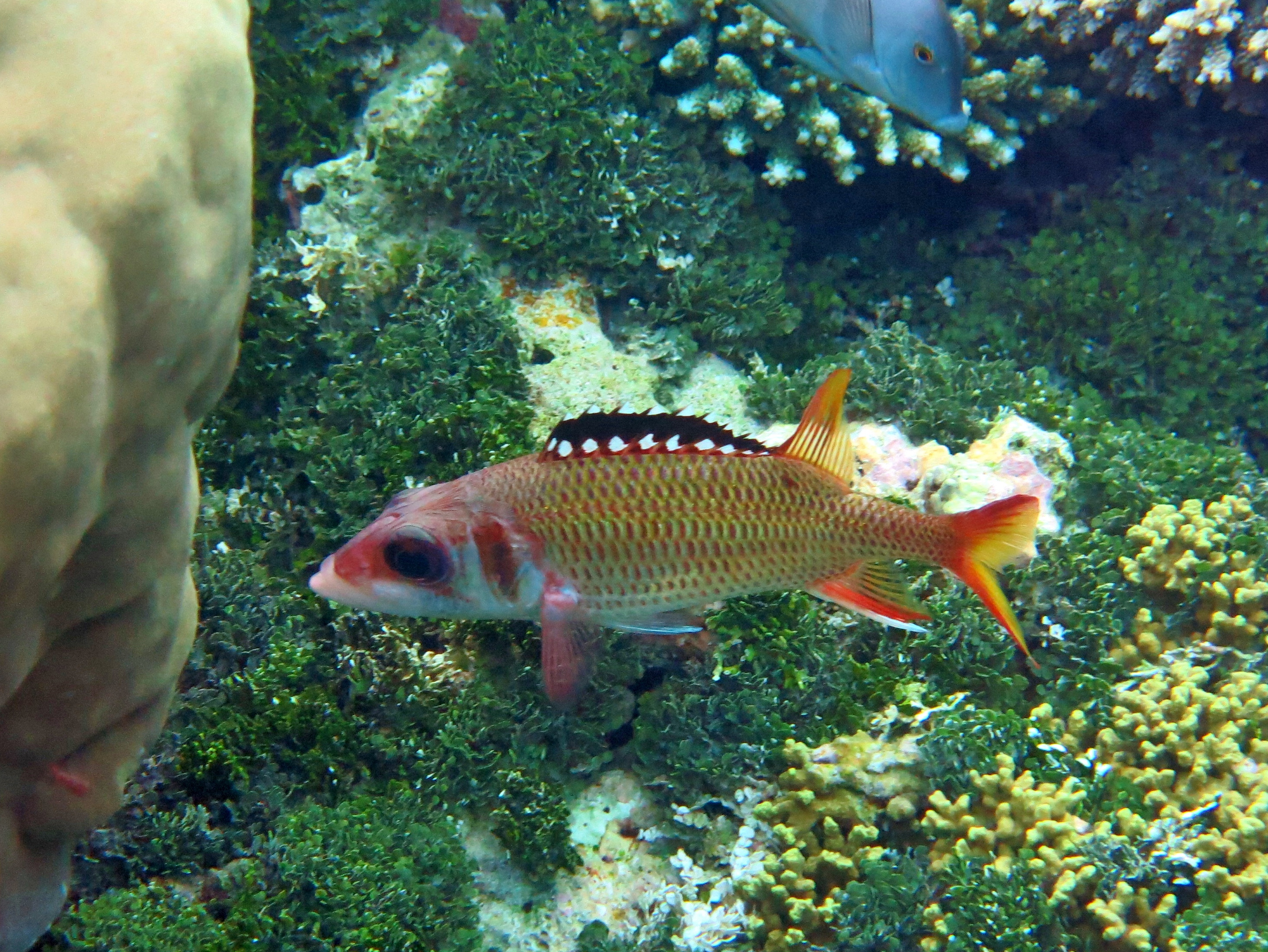

Conservation status
- Least Concern (IUCN 3.1)

Scientific classification
- Kingdom: Animalia
- Phylum: Chordata
- Class: Actinopterygii
- Order: Beryciformes
- Family: Holocentridae
- Genus: Neoniphon
- Species: N. opercularis

Binomial name
- Neoniphon opercularis Valenciennes, 1831

= Neoniphon opercularis =

Blackfin squirrelfish

Species of fish

Neoniphon opercularis, the blackfin squirrelfish, also known as the mouth-fin squirrelfish or clearfin squirrelfish, is a species of squirrelfish found in the Indian Ocean and Pacific Ocean from East Africa as far east as New Caledonia. It lives alone or in small groups in or near reefs and lagoons between 3 and 25 metres (9.8 and 82.0 ft) deep and can reach sizes of up to 35.0 centimetres (13.8 in) TL. It eats crabs and shrimps. Its dorsal fin is raised to scare off or startle predators. It also has a large venomous spine at the corner of its preopercle. It is relatively unaffected by commercial fishing, but is sometimes used as bait for tuna fisheries.
