= François Liénard de la Mivoye =

French zoologist and botanist (1782–1862)

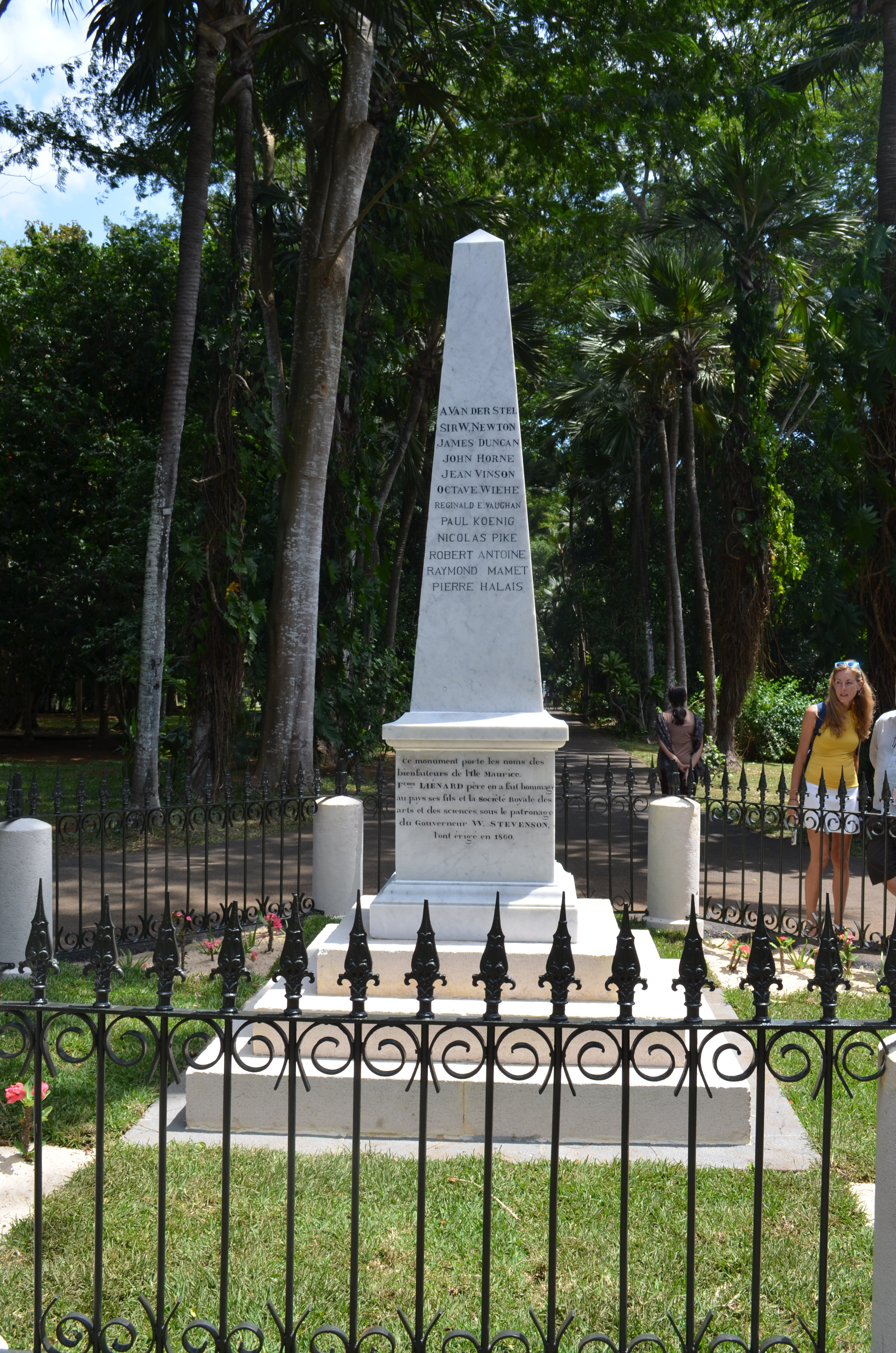
The obelisk commemorating François Liénard de la Mivoye in the Sir Seewoosagur Ramgoolam Botanical Garden

François Liénard de la Mivoye (born 29 July 1782, Visakhapatnam, died 6 November 1862, Paris) was a Francophone Mauritian naturalist, ichthyologist, zoologist and mariner. He lived most of his life in Mauritius and, in 1829, was a founder member and treasurer of the société d'histoire natural locale alongside Charles Telfair, Wenceslas Bojer, Jacques Delisse and Julien Desjardins. In 1841 this became the Société Royale des arts et des Sciences de l'île Maurice. The Society regularly sent fish specimens to Georges Cuvier in Paris and these were described in his 22 volume Histoire naturelle des poissons, this was completed after Cuvier’s death by Achille Valenciennes. Liénard was responsible for describing a number of species including the now extinct Rodrigues giant day gecko (Phesulma gigas), Liénard being the last known person to see this species.

Liénard is commemorated in the specific name of the predatory sea snail Conus lienardi. He is also commemorated in a white marble obelisk which sits in the Sir Seewoosagur Ramgoolam Botanical Garden in Mauritius.

He married Marie Françoise Chapon in Port Louis on 19 August 1807, and the couple had a daughter Elizé Liénard on 2 September 1808 and a son Jules Victor Liénard on 10 April 1811, both born in Port Louis.
