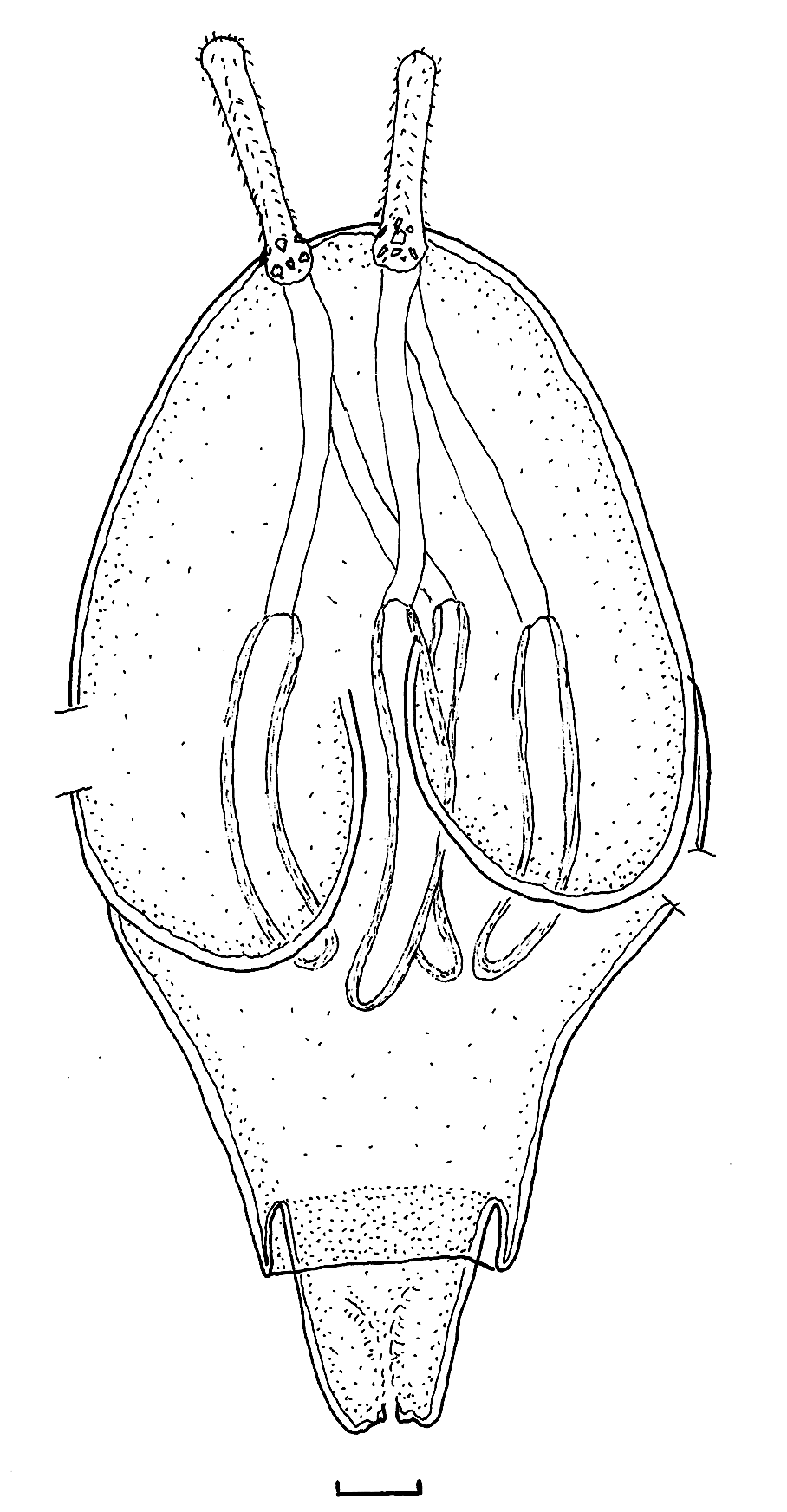
- Nybelinia basimegacantha

Scientific classification
- Kingdom: Animalia
- Phylum: Platyhelminthes
- Class: Cestoda
- Subclass: Eucestoda
- Order: Trypanorhyncha

Suborders and families
- Acystidea; Hepatoxylidae; Paranybeliniidae; Sphyriocephalidae; Tentaculariidae; Cystidea; Dasyrhynchidae; Eutetrarhynchidae; Gilquiniidae; Gymnorhynchidae; Hornelliellidae; Lacistorhynchidae; Mustelicolidae; Otobothriidae; Pseudogrillotiidae; Pterobothriidae; Rhinoptericolidae; Tetrarhynchobothriidae

= Trypanorhyncha =

Order of flatworms

Trypanorhyncha is an order of cestodes, a type of flatworm.

Some species infect gamefish, such as sciaenids, during the parasitic worm's plerocercoid stage, and are commonly called spaghetti worm because of their appearance, approximating cooked spaghetti. Such species include Poecilancistrium caryophyllum and Pseudogrillotia pleistacantha.

Their scolex, or head region, has 2 to 4 bothria, or sucking grooves that cling onto the host. They have four retractable tentacles.

== Gallery ==
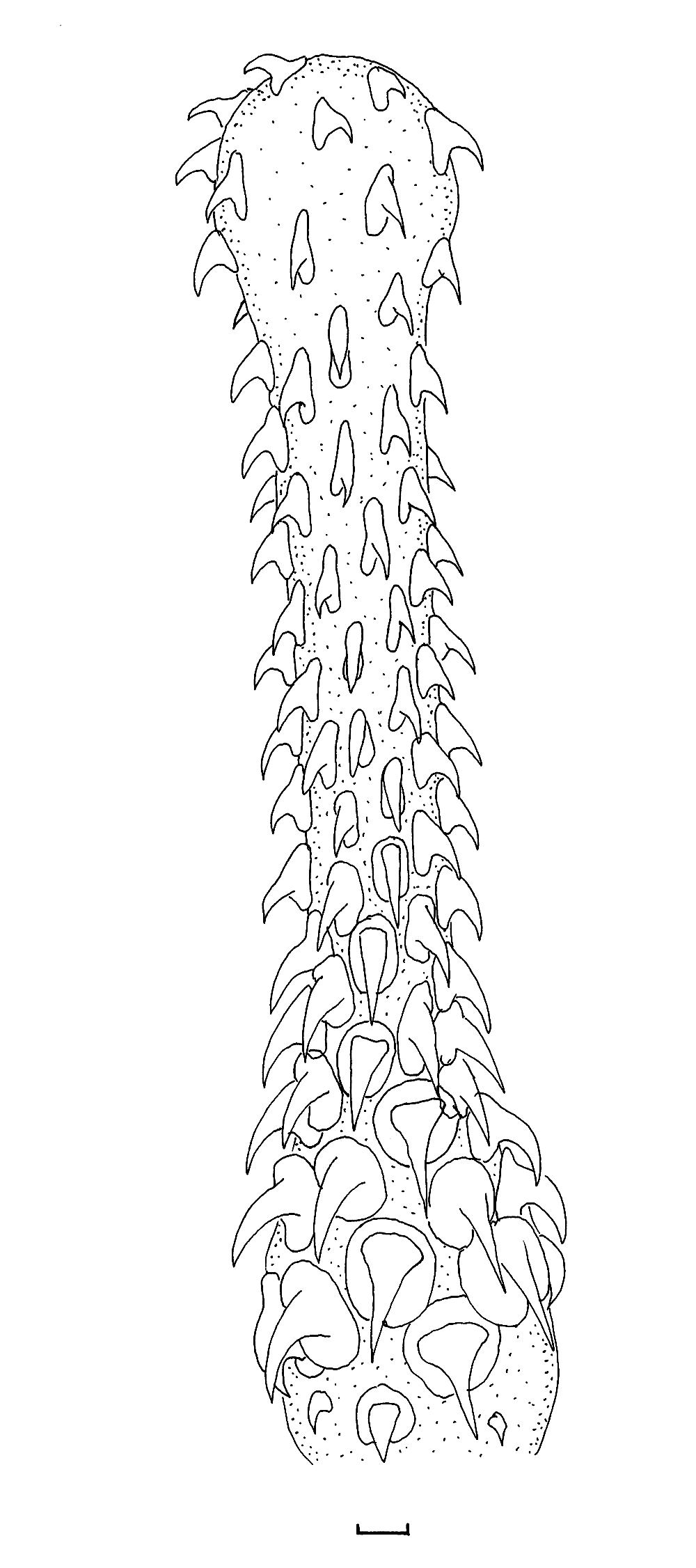
Tentacle of Nybelinia basimegacantha, parasitic in the fish Neoniphon sammara

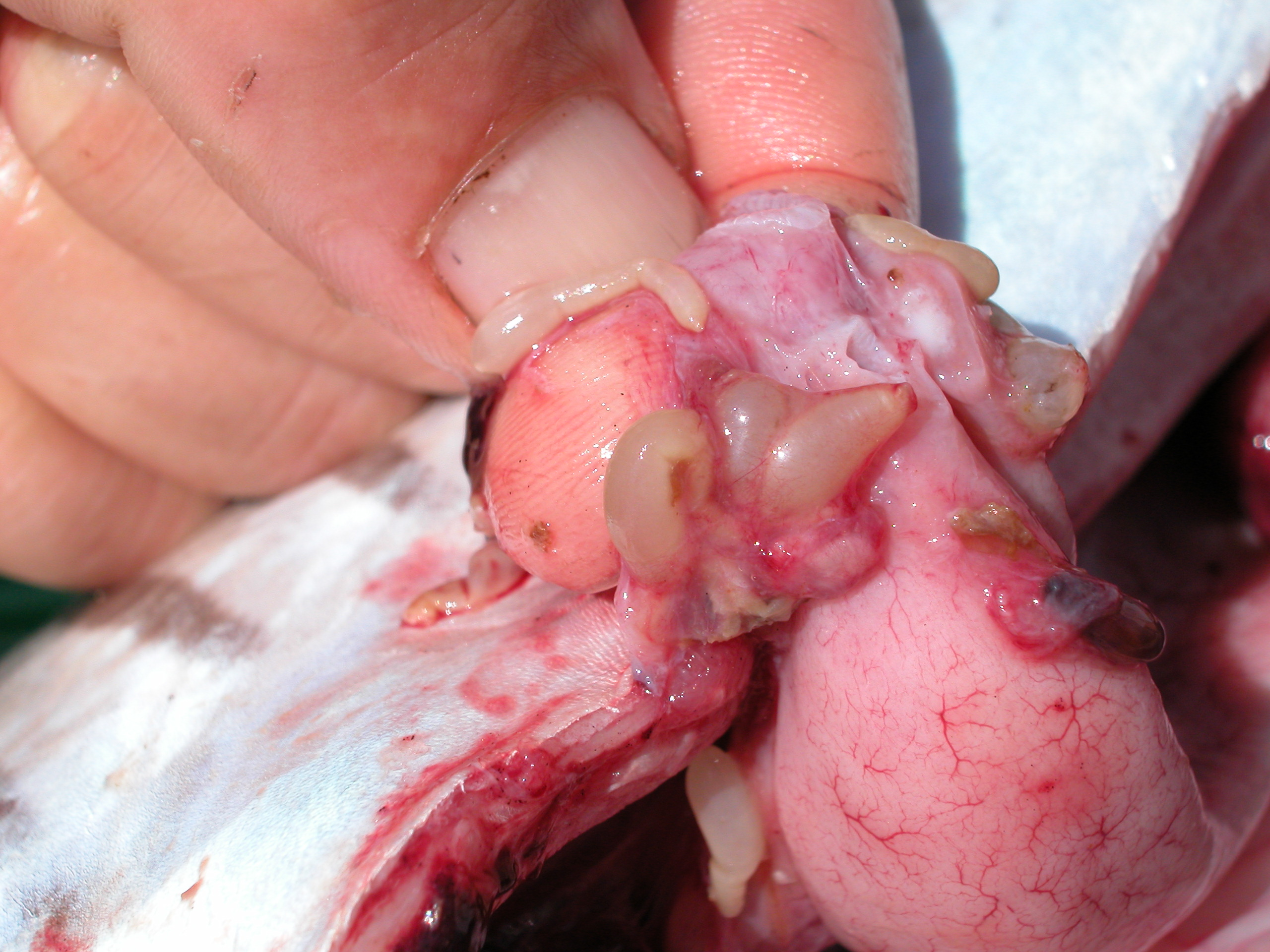
Plerocerci of Callitetrarhynchus gracilis in the body cavity of the fish Scomberomorus commerson

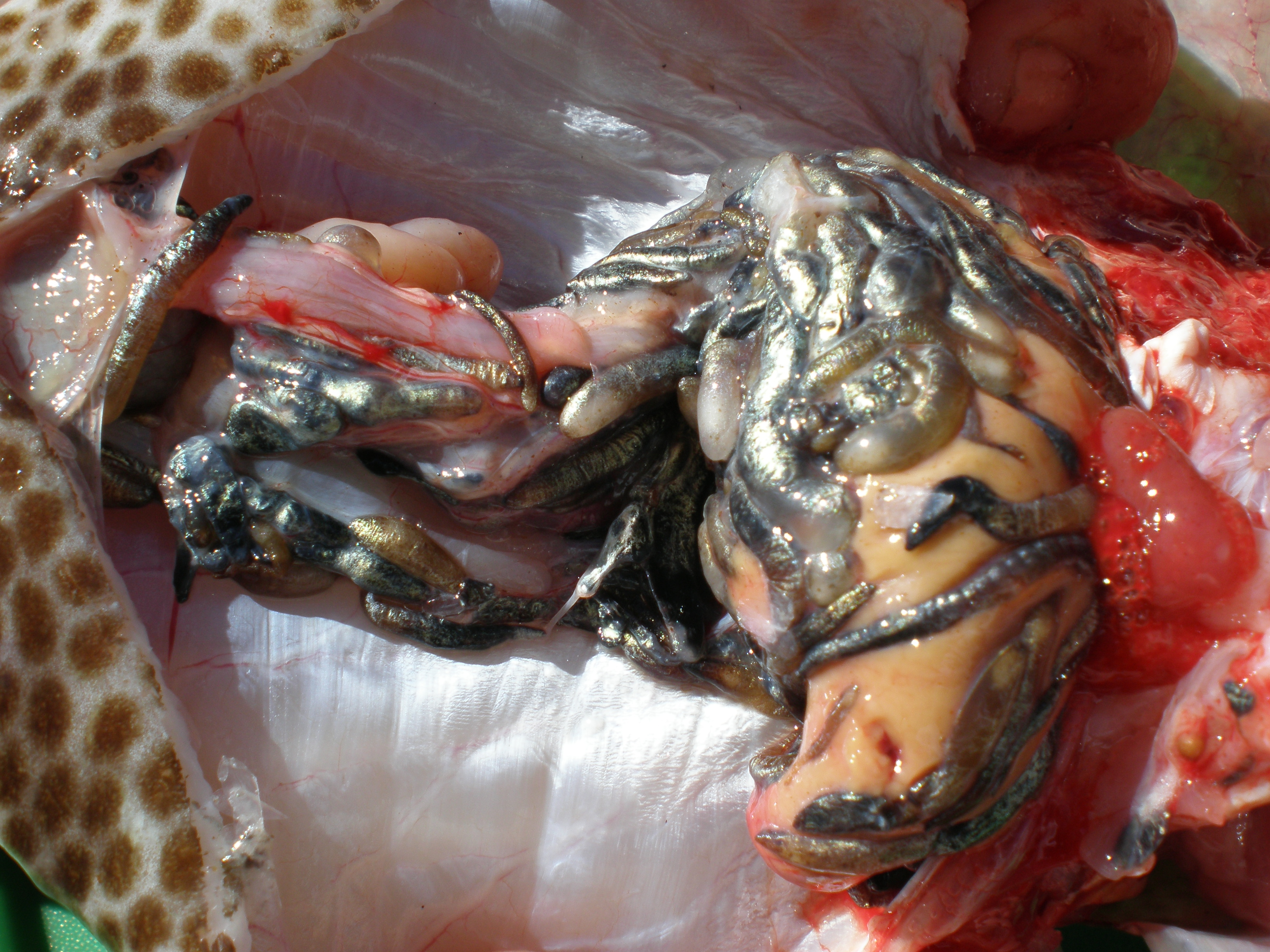
melanized plerocerci in the bodycavity of a grouper

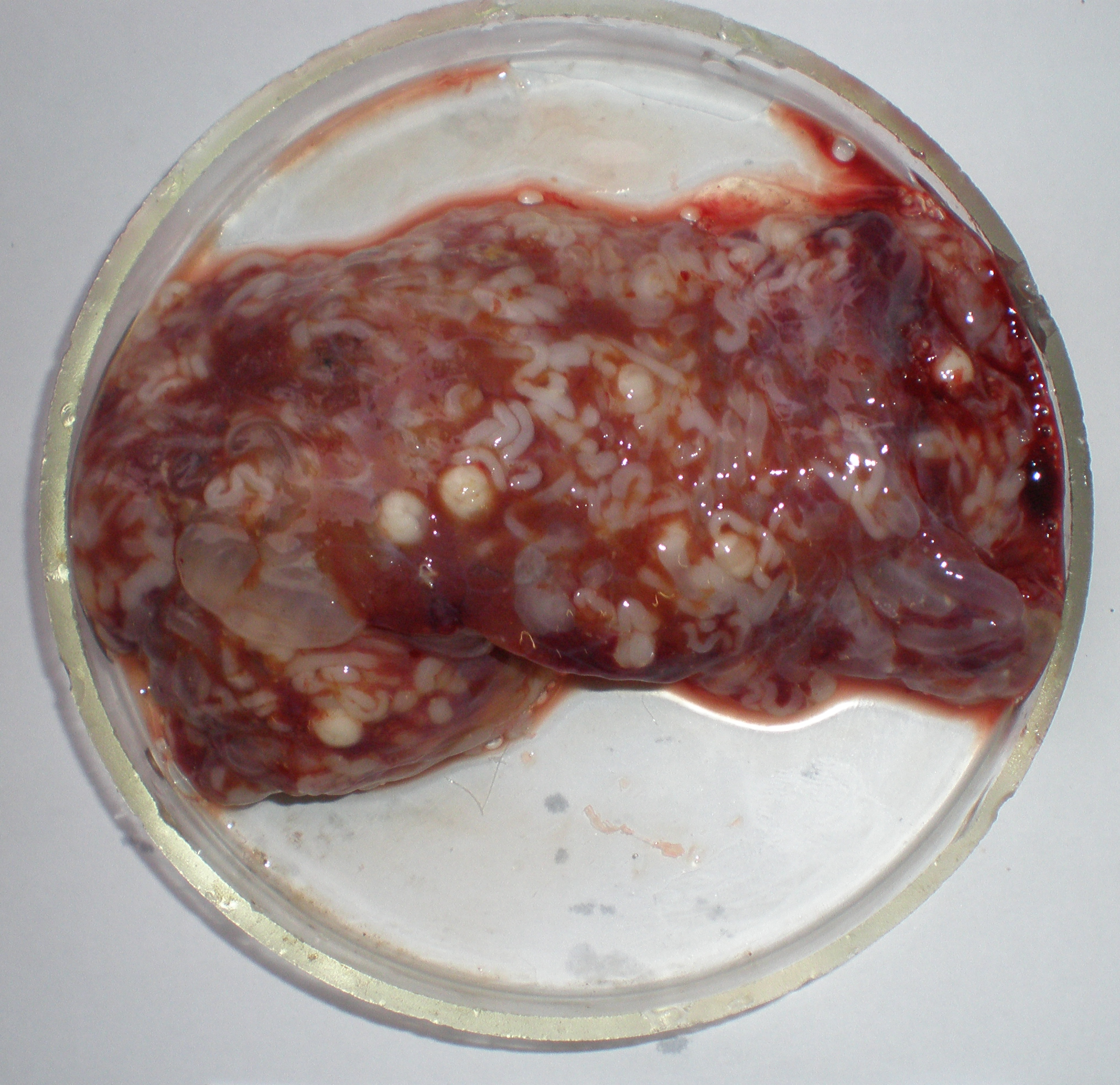
Molicola horridus in the liver of the fish Diodon hystrix
