= Julien Desjardins =

French zoologist (1799–1840)

Julien François Desjardins (27 July 1799, Centre de Flacq – 18 April 1840, Paris) was a French zoologist, the son of Julien Jouan Desjardins (1766–1853) and Henriette Émilie Marcotte. He married Julie Renée Maréchal, his first cousin by his mother.

He studied in Paris from 1822 to 1824 under Cuvier, and was influenced by Louis Jacques Thénard (1777–1857), Joseph Louis Gay-Lussac (1778–1850), Pierre André Latreille (1762–1833), René Desfontaines (1750–1831) and others. He embarked on a career in civil engineering, but soon realised that he should return to his original passion of natural history and studied at the Muséum d'Histoire Naturelle.

With Charles Telfair, Wenceslas Bojer, and Jacques Delisse, Desjardins took part in founding the Société d'Histoire Naturelle de l'Île Maurice on 11 August 1829. He was the first secretary of this Society and editor of the publication Rapport annuel sur les travaux de la Société d'histoire naturelle de l'Île Maurice until 1839, when he left for France to publish his observations. His premature death led to the acquisition of his manuscript by Félix Édouard Guérin-Méneville (1799–1874), who never published it. An excerpt from the Proceedings of the Zoological Society of London of a meeting held on 23 October 1838 reads:

A letter was read from M. Julien Desjardins, Secretary of the Natural History Society of Mauritius, stating that it was his intention to leave that island on 1 January 1839 for England, with a large collection of objects in natural history, many of which he intended for the Society.

Desjardins made a thorough search for fossils in his home region of Flacq, and found fragments of the osseous cover and humerus bones of endemic tortoises. At Plaine des Roches and at Montagne Blanche, he found them scattered on the surface. At Mare La Chaux and Riche Mare, they occurred in mud and shallow water.

L'Ichthyologie à l'Île Maurice de 1829 à 1846 lists 28 species with the specific name desjardinsii.
