= Leiolopisma ceciliae =

Conservation status
- Extinct (IUCN 3.1)

Scientific classification
- Kingdom: Animalia
- Phylum: Chordata
- Class: Reptilia
- Order: Squamata
- Suborder: Scinciformata
- Infraorder: Scincomorpha
- Family: Eugongylidae
- Genus: Leiolopisma
- Species: †L. ceciliae

Binomial name
- †Leiolopisma ceciliae Arnold & Bour, 2008

Species of lizard

Leiolopisma ceciliae, also known as the Réunion giant skink, is an extinct species of skink found on Réunion.
