= Tuabou =

Tuabou Tyabou
- Village
- Location within Senegal
- Coordinates: 14°59′N 12°28′W
- Country: Senegal
- Region: Tambacounda
- Department: Bakel
- Arrondissement: Moudéry

Population (2002)
  - Total: 2,038
- Time zone: UTC+0 (GMT)

Tuabou (also Tuabu or Tyabu) is a village in Sénégal on the banks of the Senegal river, near the border with Mauritania. It lies within the Bakel department in the Tambacounda region.

== History ==
Tuabou was the capital of Gooy, one of the two provinces of the Kingdom of Gajaaga.

== People from Tuabou ==
- Niama, princess and slave
- Abdoulaye Bathily, politician and historian
- Samba Ndiaye, military engineer
