= Kidira Arrondissement =

- Arrondissement
- Interactive map of Kidira Arrondissement
- Country: Senegal
- Region: Tambacounda Region
- Department: Bakel Department
- Time zone: UTC±00:00 (GMT)

Kidira Arrondissement is an arrondissement of the Bakel Department in the Tambacounda Region of Senegal.

== Subdivisions ==
The arrondissement is divided administratively into rural communities and in turn into villages.
