= Île Raphael =

Outer island of Mauritius

Coordinates: 16°27′0″S 59°37′0″E

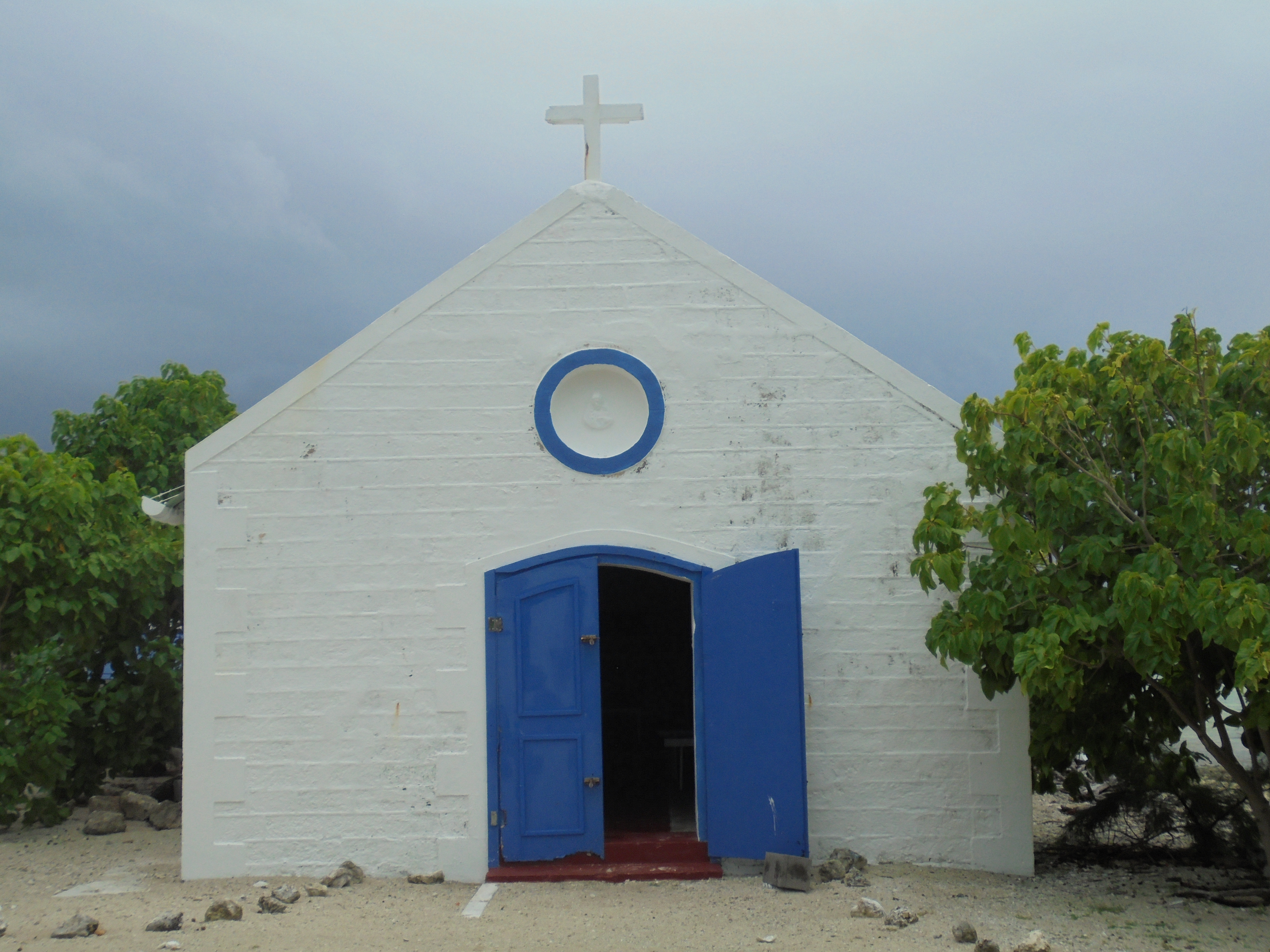
Île Raphael Chapel in St. Brandon

Île Raphael is an island in the Saint Brandon archipelago, a group of 30 outer islands of Mauritius. The island is named after Veuve Raphaël. Veuve Raphaël's husband was a sea captain and had installations on the corner of rue (route) des Pamplemousses and rue Fanfaron in Port Louis. Captain Raphaël travelled regularly to Île Raphael, St Brandon from Port Louis and, on 17 May 1816 and November 1817, is on record as bringing back salted fish (Poisson Salé) on a Lugger called 'Le Cheriby' ('angel' in old French). Île Raphaël is today the headquarters and principal fishing base of the Raphael Fishing Company which is the second oldest commercial company in Mauritius.

== Population ==
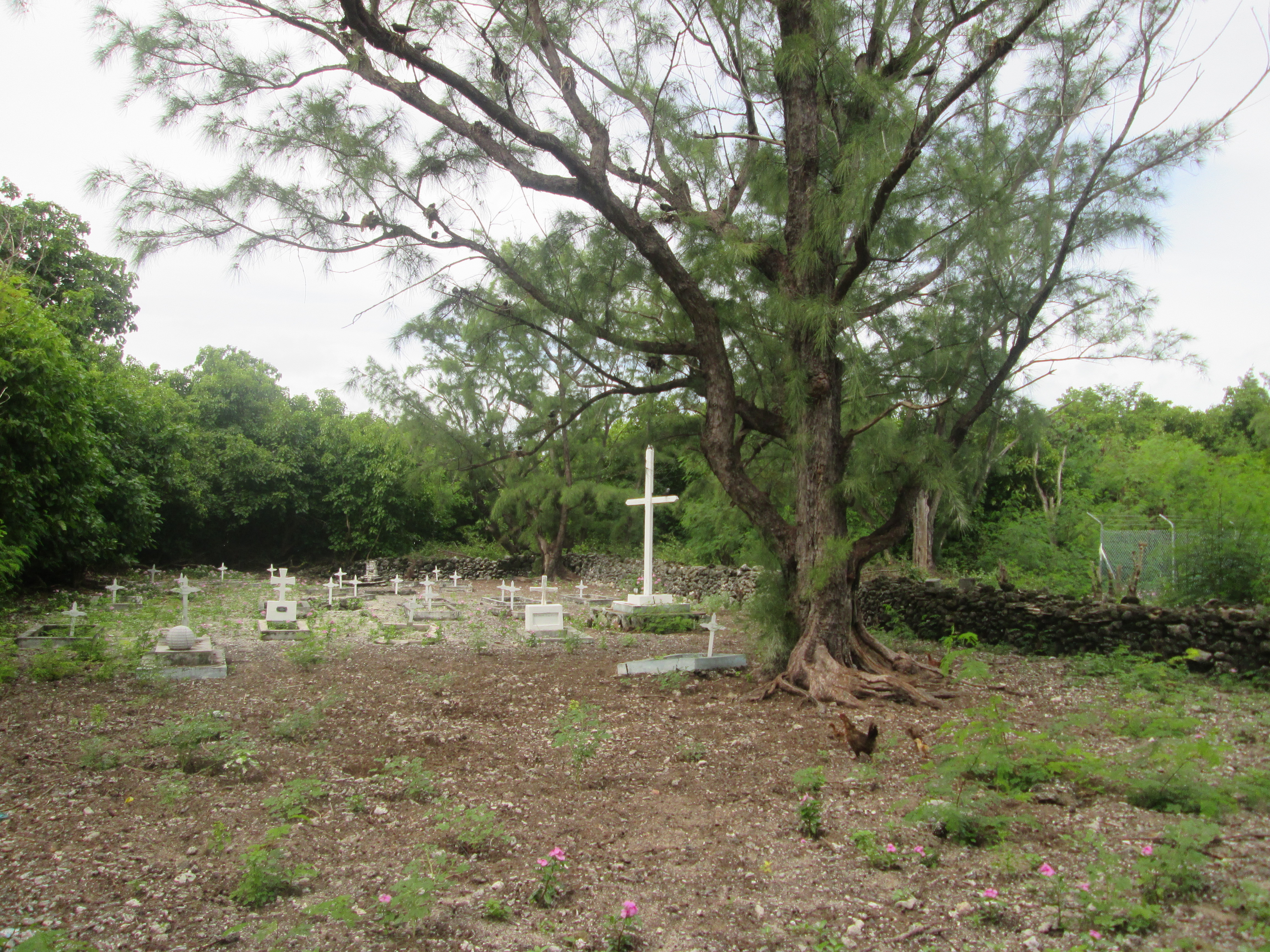
Île Raphael Cemetery in St. Brandon

Today, Île Raphael's population amounts to around 40 people and constitutes the majority of Saint Brandon's entire resident population. Some employees of Raphael Fishing Company stay and work on the island for periods of up to seven months, depending on the season.

== Key biodiversity area ==
In 1968, the island was visited by the Mauritian scientist France Staub and his seminal work called Birds of the Mascarenes and Saint Brandon was partially based on his experiences here. In Chapter (7) called Seabirds of Saint Brandon, Staub lists breeding seabirds and determines that Saint Brandon then had amongst 'the largest colonies in the world of Sooty Tern'. This island is located on the Cargados Carajos coral reef atoll system, part of a CEPF designated Key Biodiversity Area (KBA) in the Southwest Indian Ocean. The Cargados Carajos are closely skirted by busy Southeast Asian shipping lanes (North and South of the Archipelago) making its unique ecosystem vulnerable to a variety of risks which pose threats to its long-term existence as a Key Biodiversity Area.

Ongoing and future threats include:

- (i) rust & heavy metal seepage from existing shipwrecks into coral reefs.
- (ii) seepage of rust and heavy metals from future shipwrecks
- (iii) spillage of petroleum/heavy oil as a direct consequence of new shipwrecks
- (iv) cyclones and high winds up to 180 km/h (110 mph) with associated flooding.
- (v) tsunami, potentially from any future earthquake in southern Sumatra to the East and, speculatively, from the Reunion Hotspot inter alia.
- (vi) outbreaks of disease and importation of Invasive Alien Species (IAS) into its globally unique flora and fauna.

== Image gallery ==
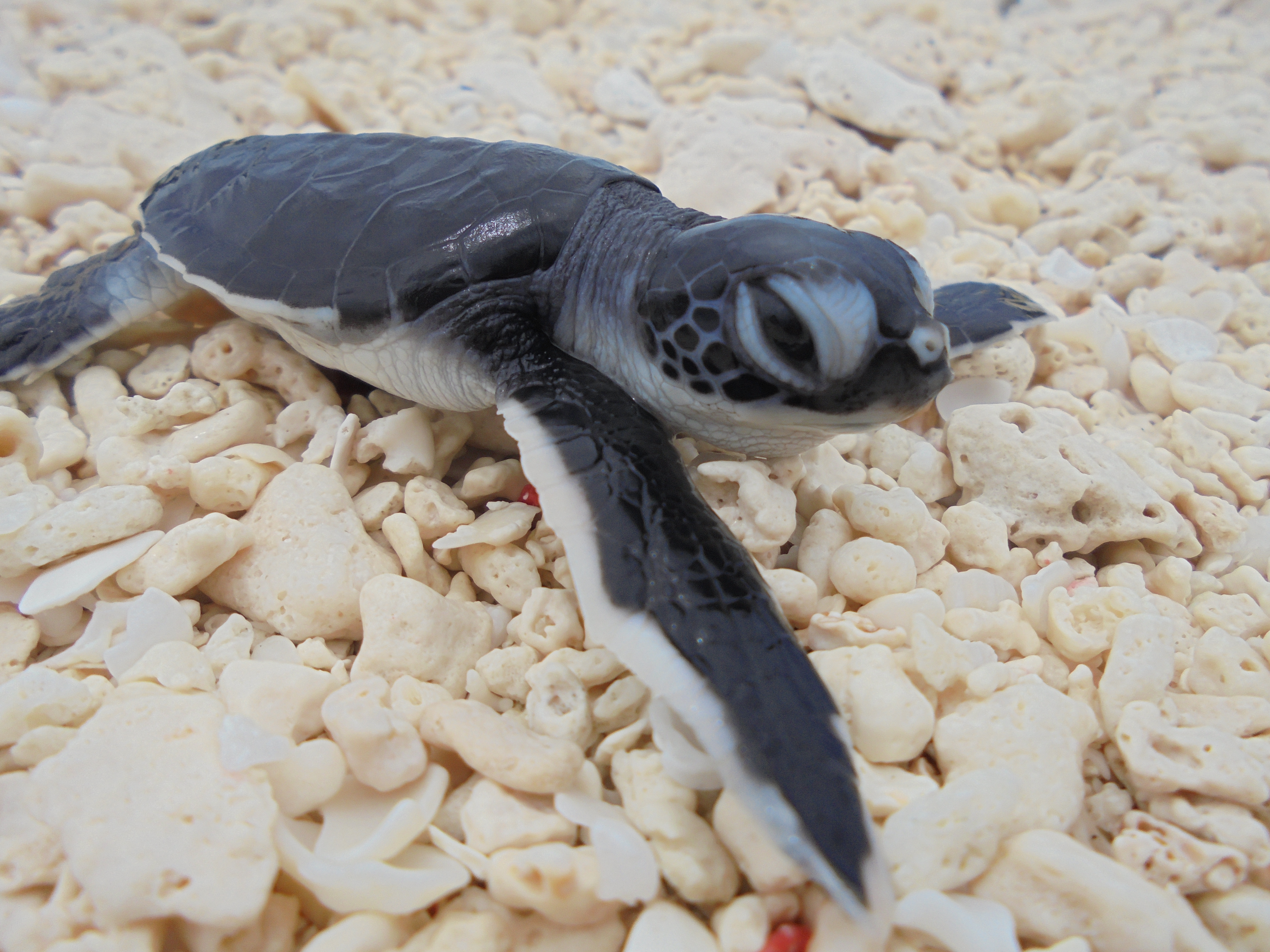
Protecting St Brandon Islands

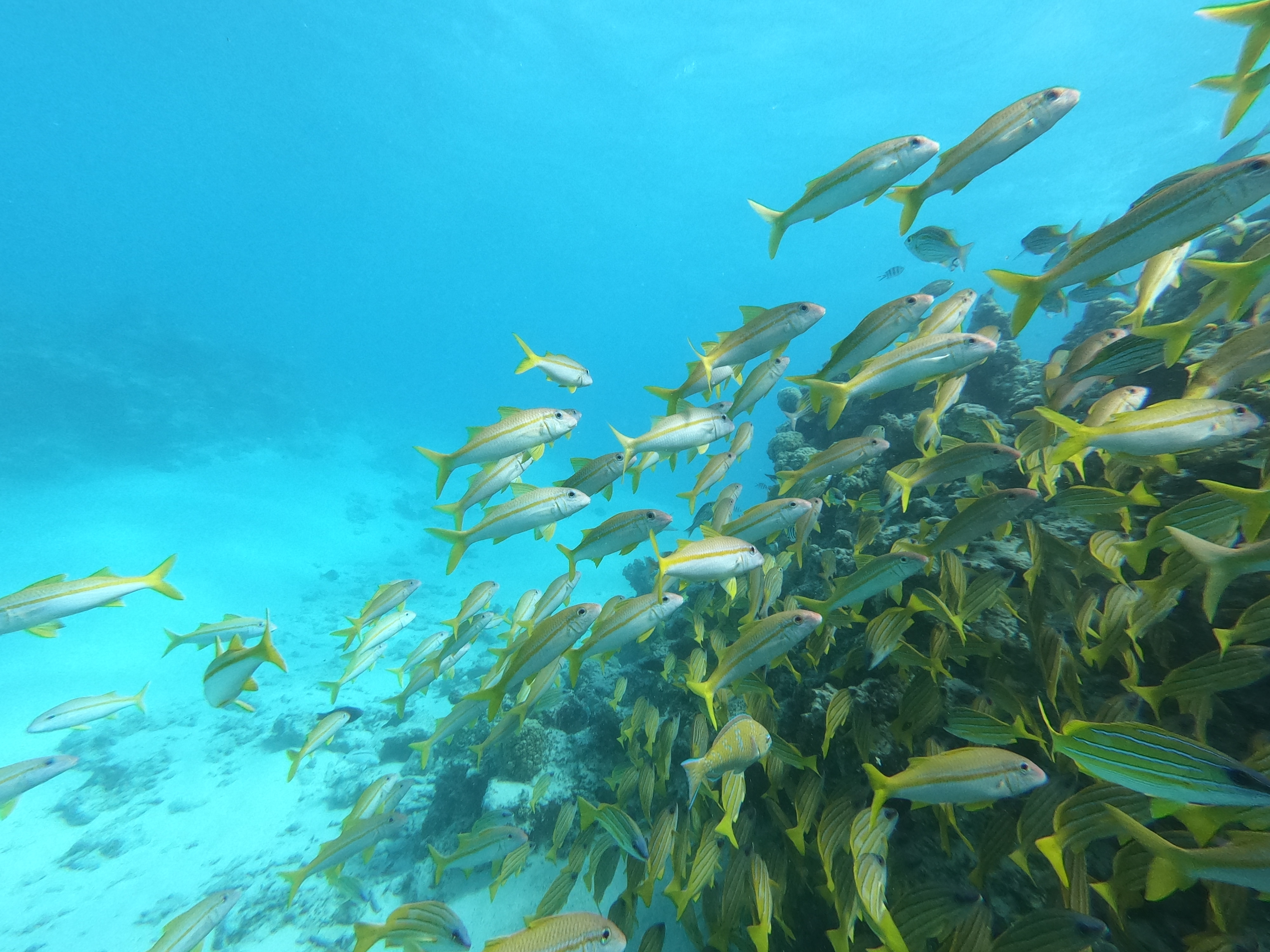
Protecting Fauna of St Brandon Atoll

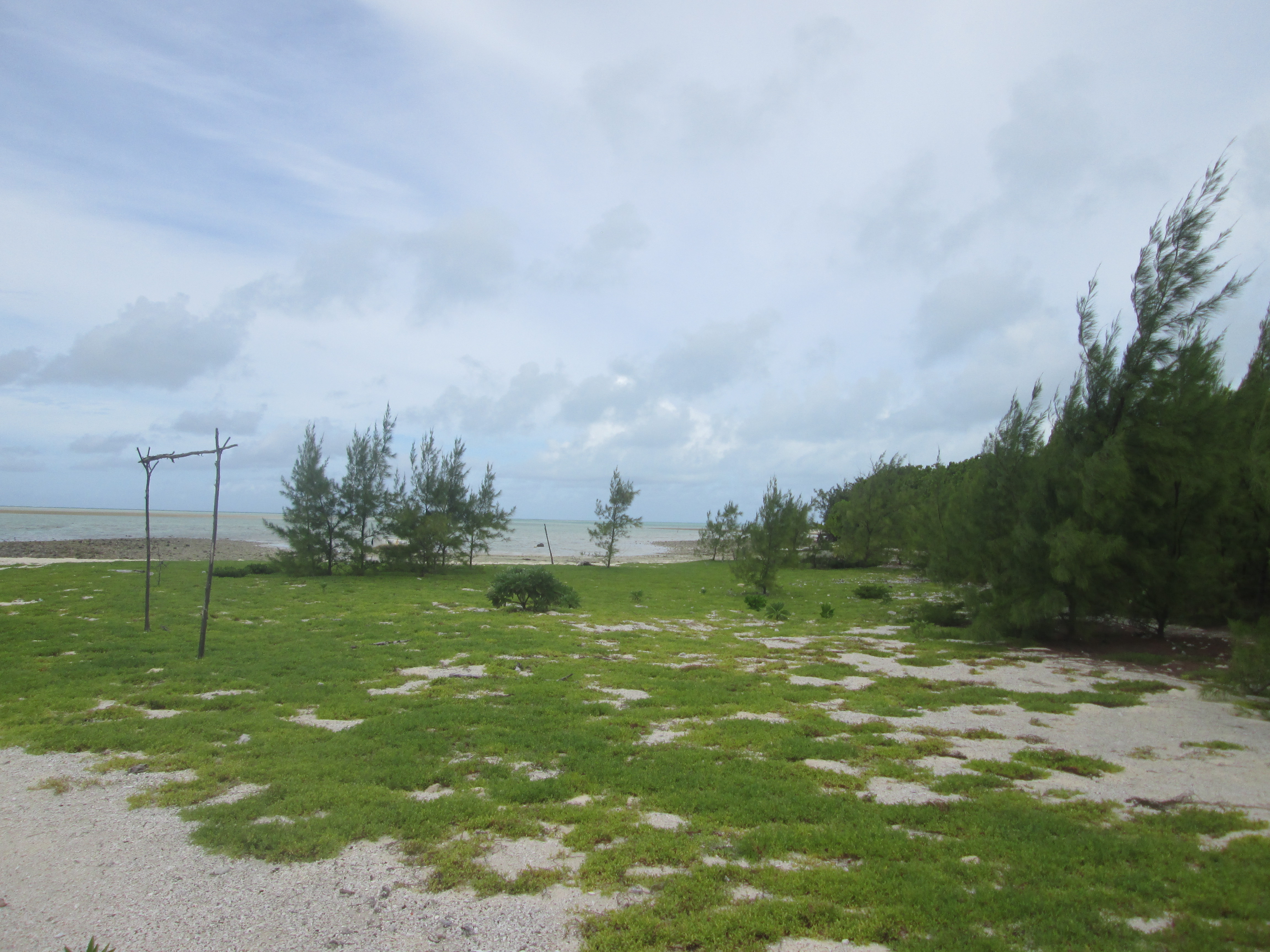
The Thirteen Islands of St Brandon - Images of Île Raphael, Cargados Carajos in Mauritius

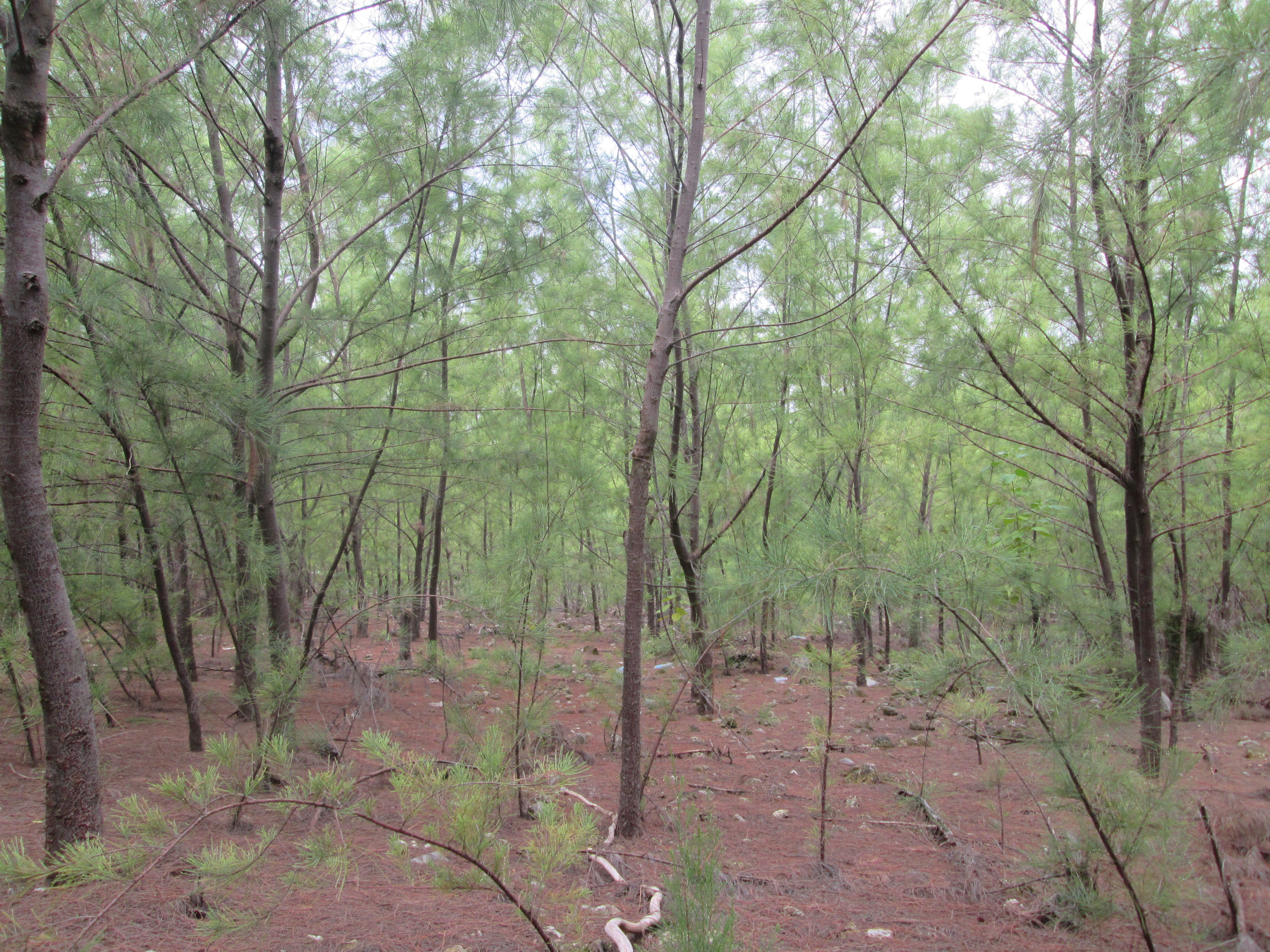
The Thirteen Islands of St Brandon - Images of Île Raphael, Cargados Carajos in Mauritius

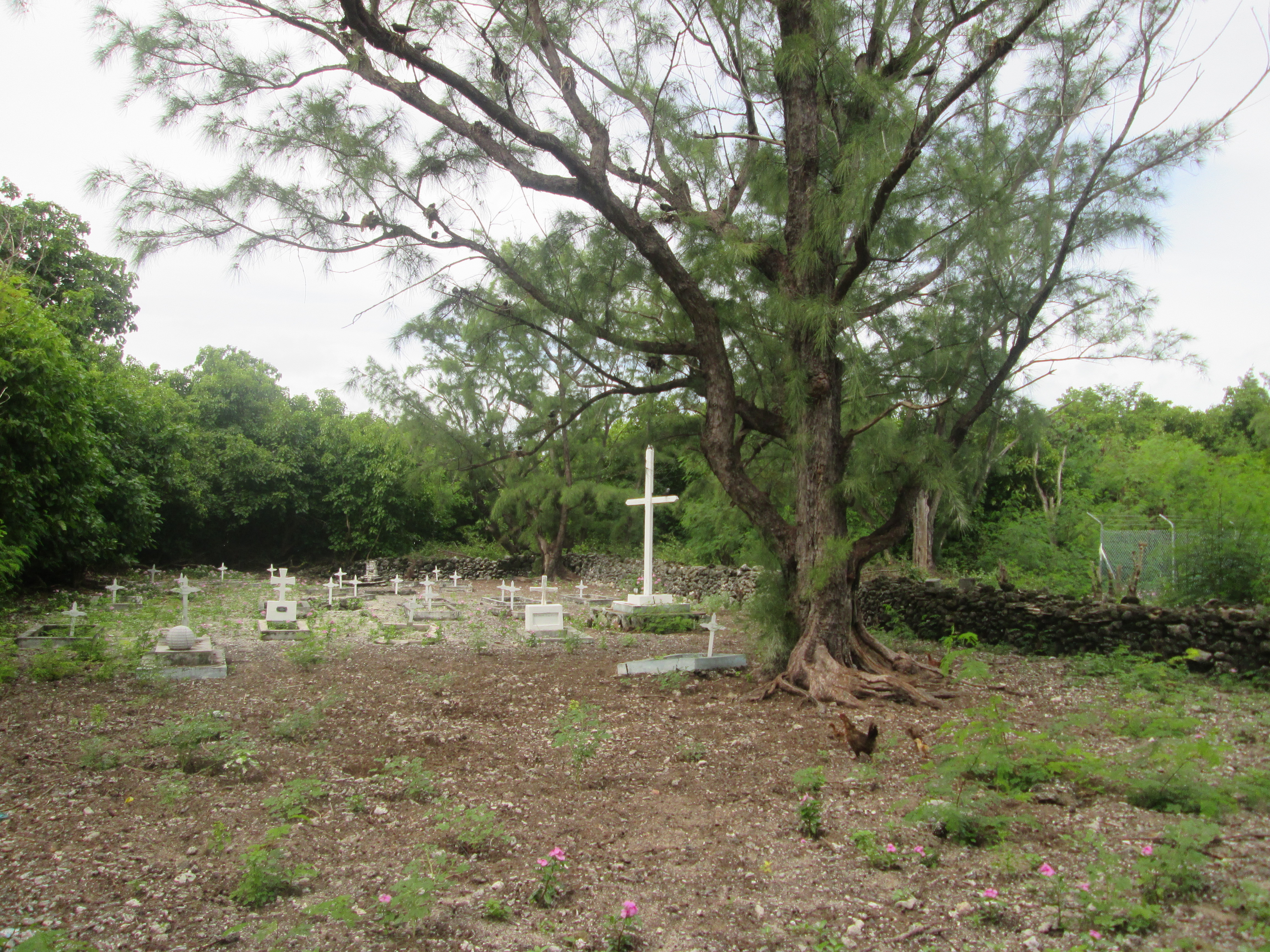
The Thirteen Islands of St Brandon - Cemetery of Île Raphael

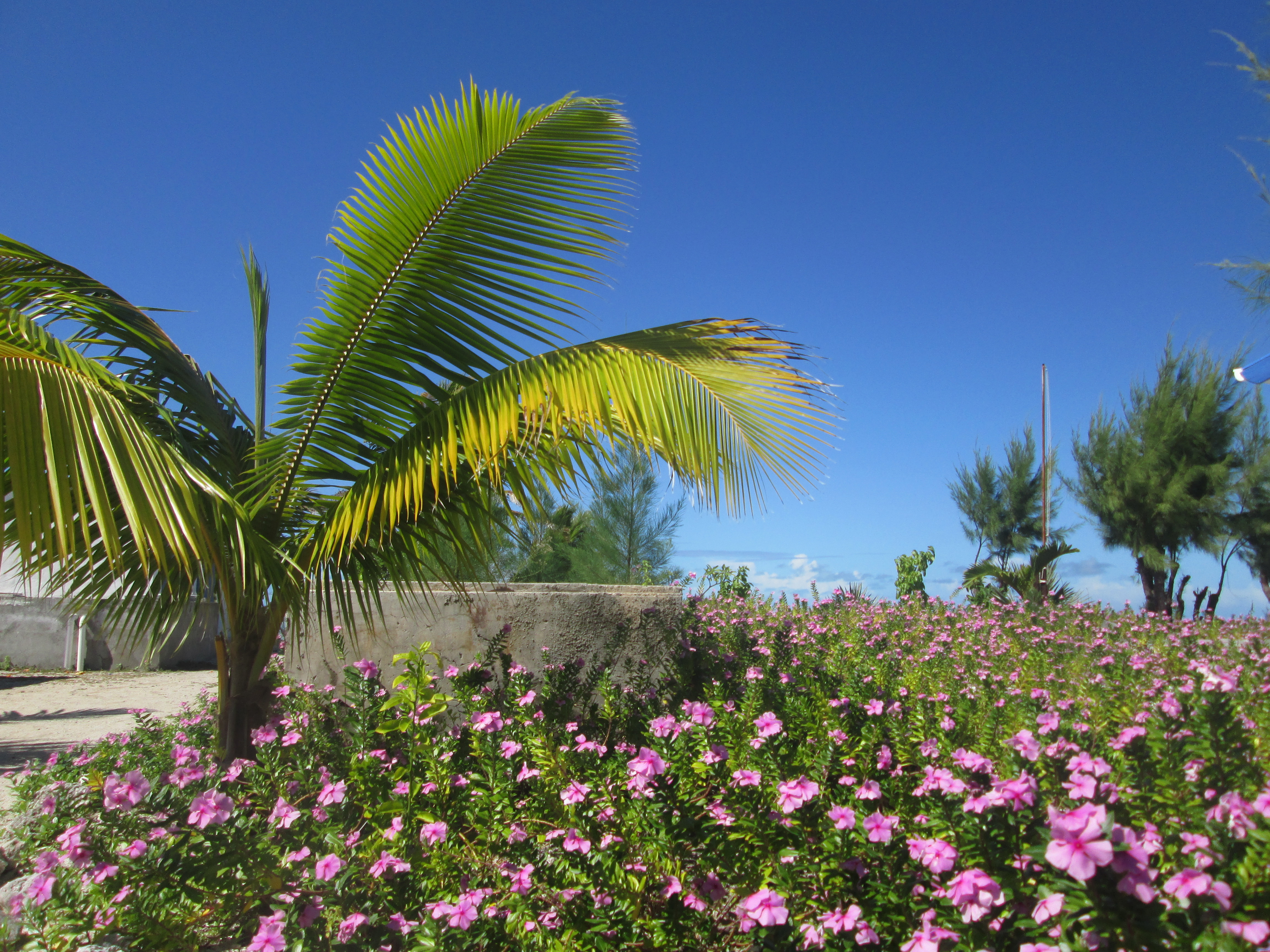
The Thirteen Islands of St Brandon - Images of Île Raphael, Cargados Carajos in Mauritius

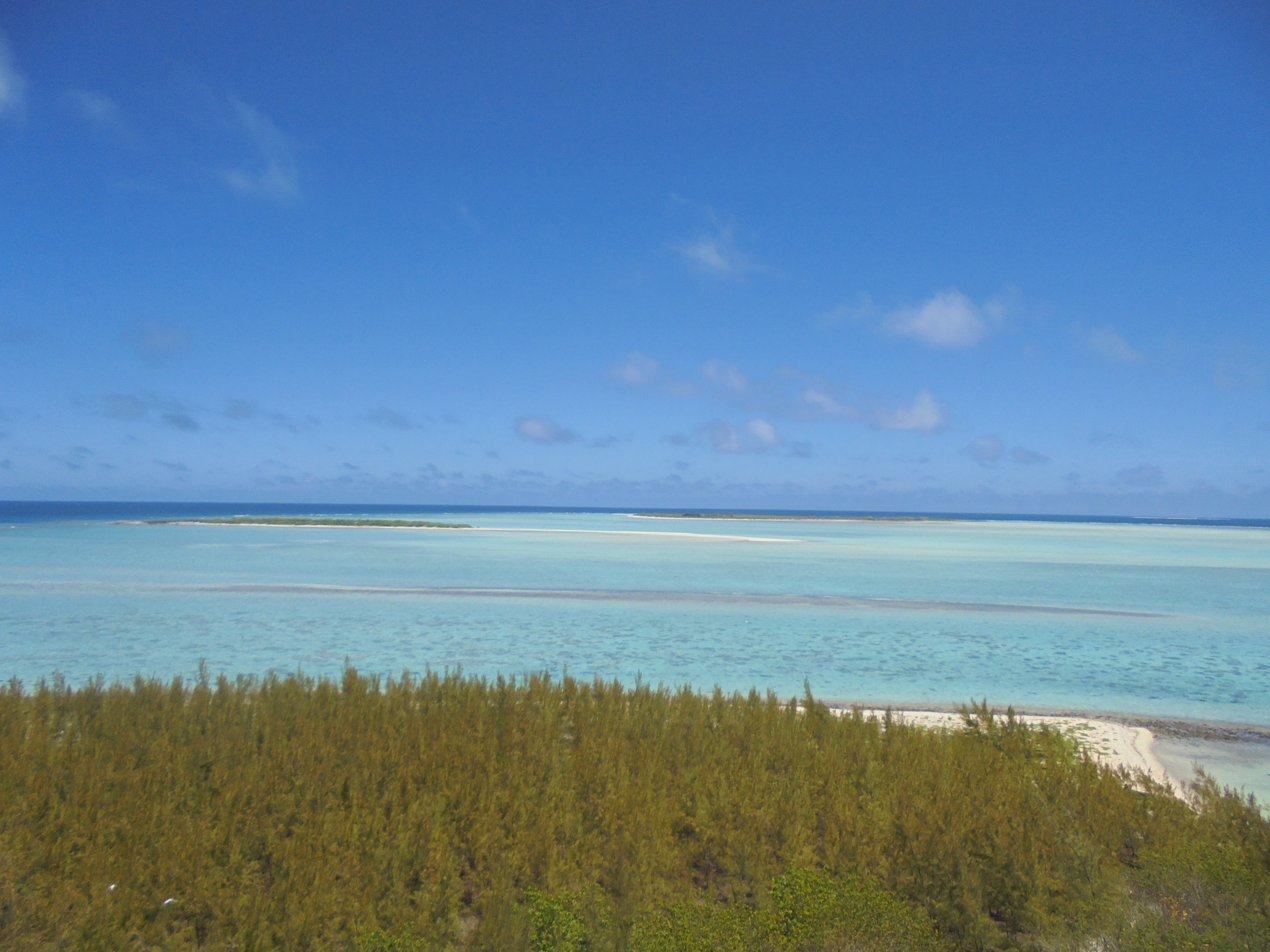
The Thirteen Islands of St Brandon - Images of Île Raphael, Cargados Carajos in Mauritius

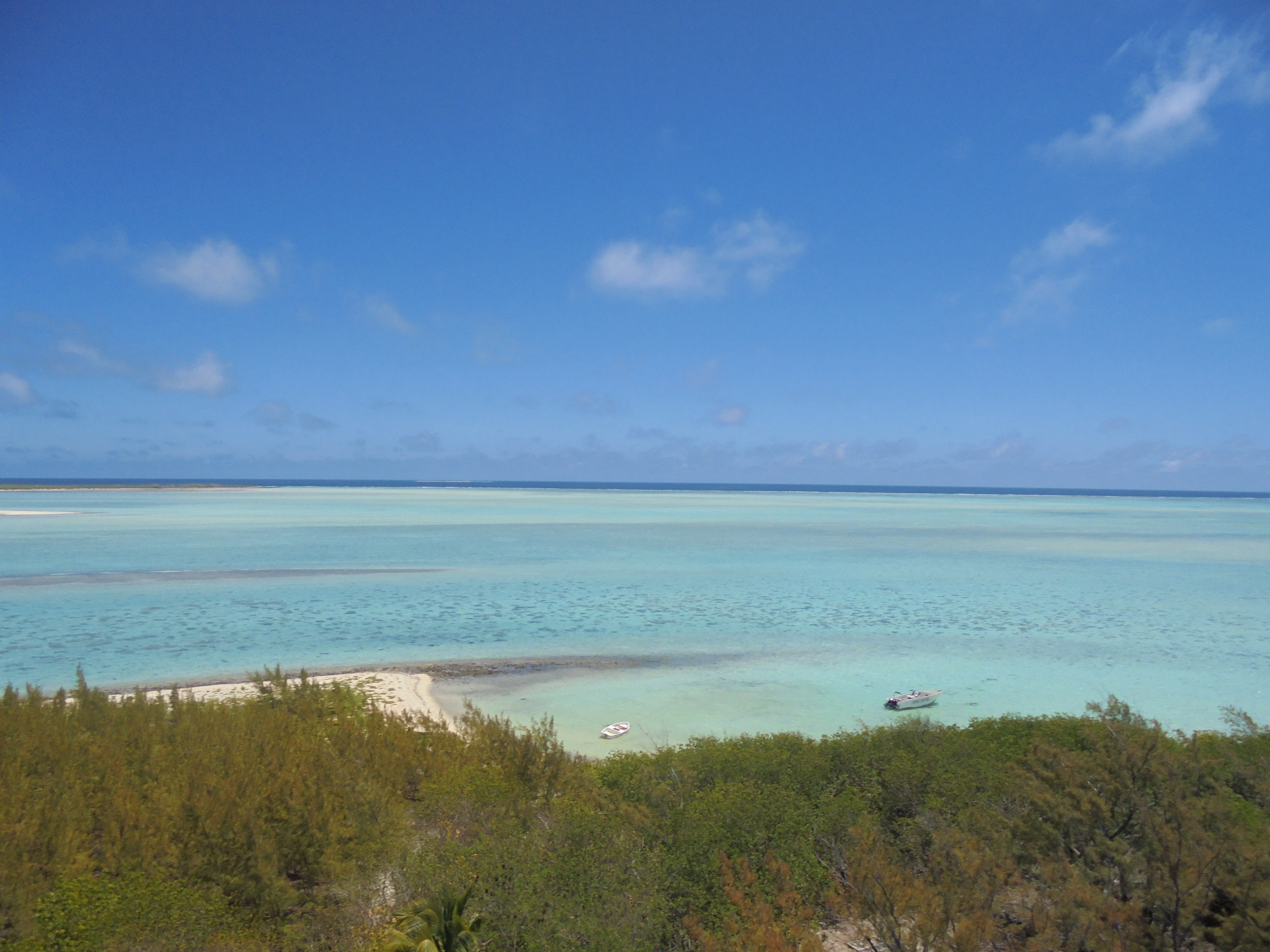
The Thirteen Islands of St Brandon - Images of Île Raphael, Cargados Carajos in Mauritius

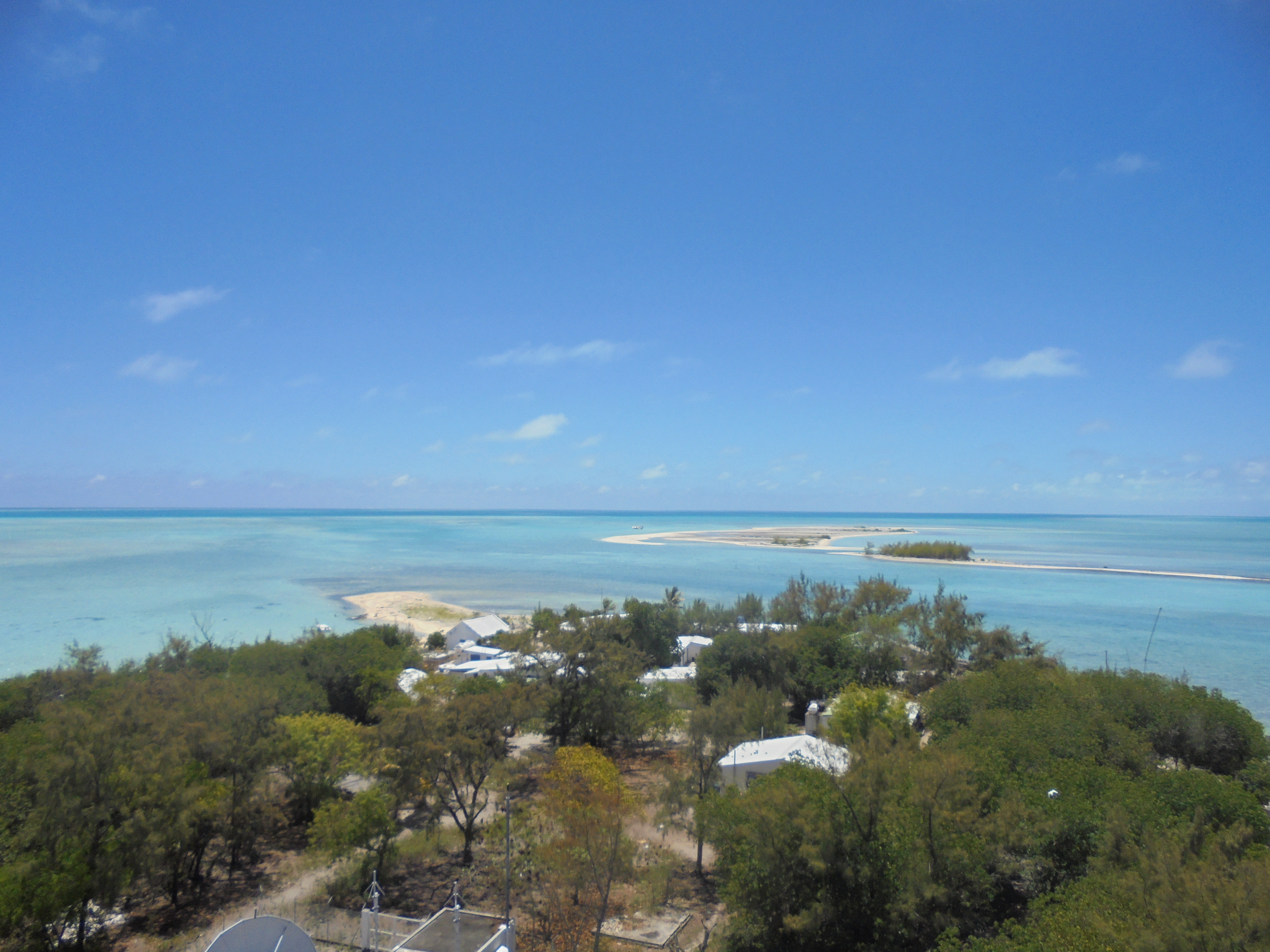
The Thirteen Islands of St Brandon - Images of Île Raphael, Cargados Carajos in Mauritius

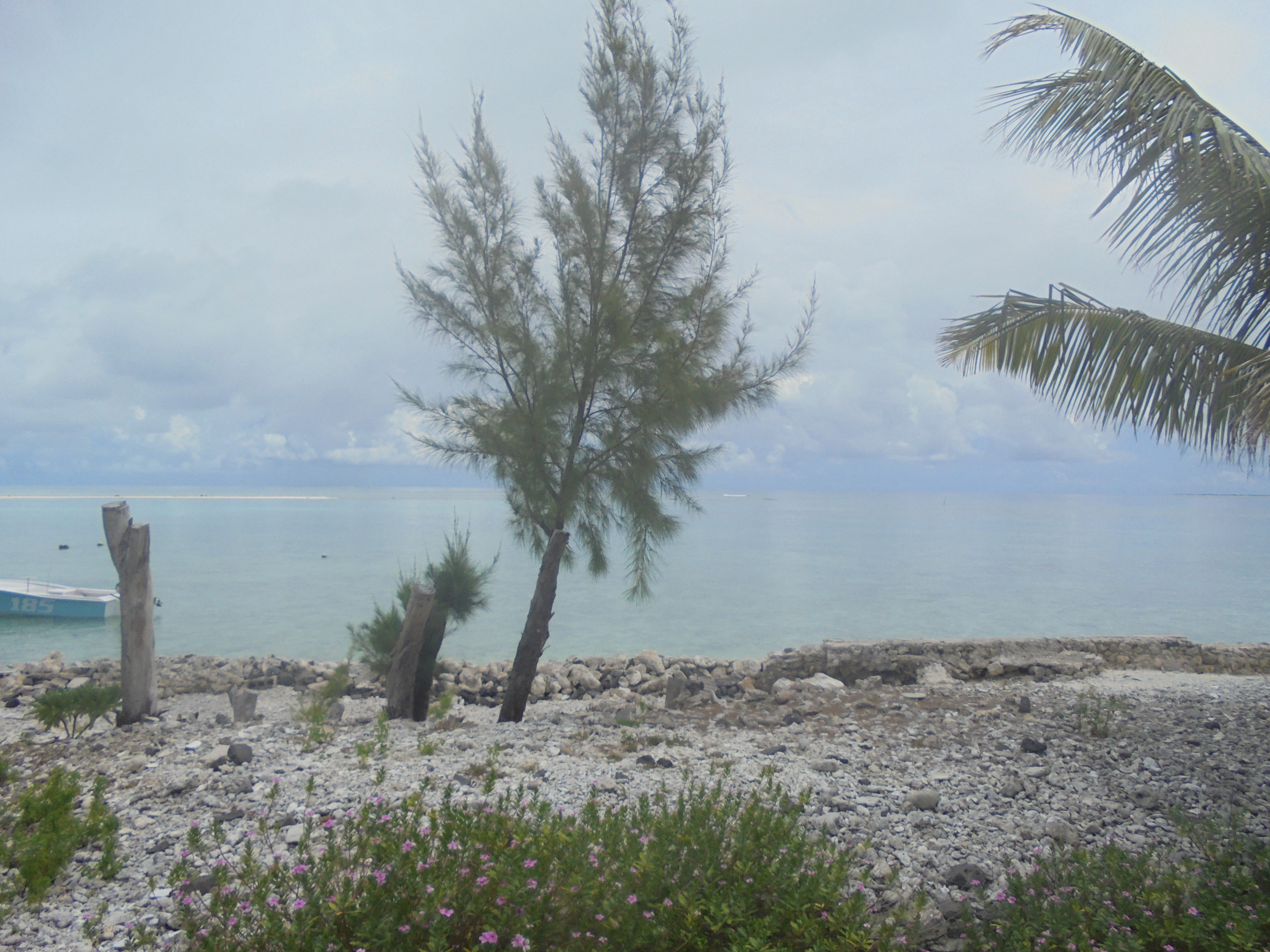
The Thirteen Islands of St Brandon - Images of Île Raphael, Cargados Carajos in Mauritius

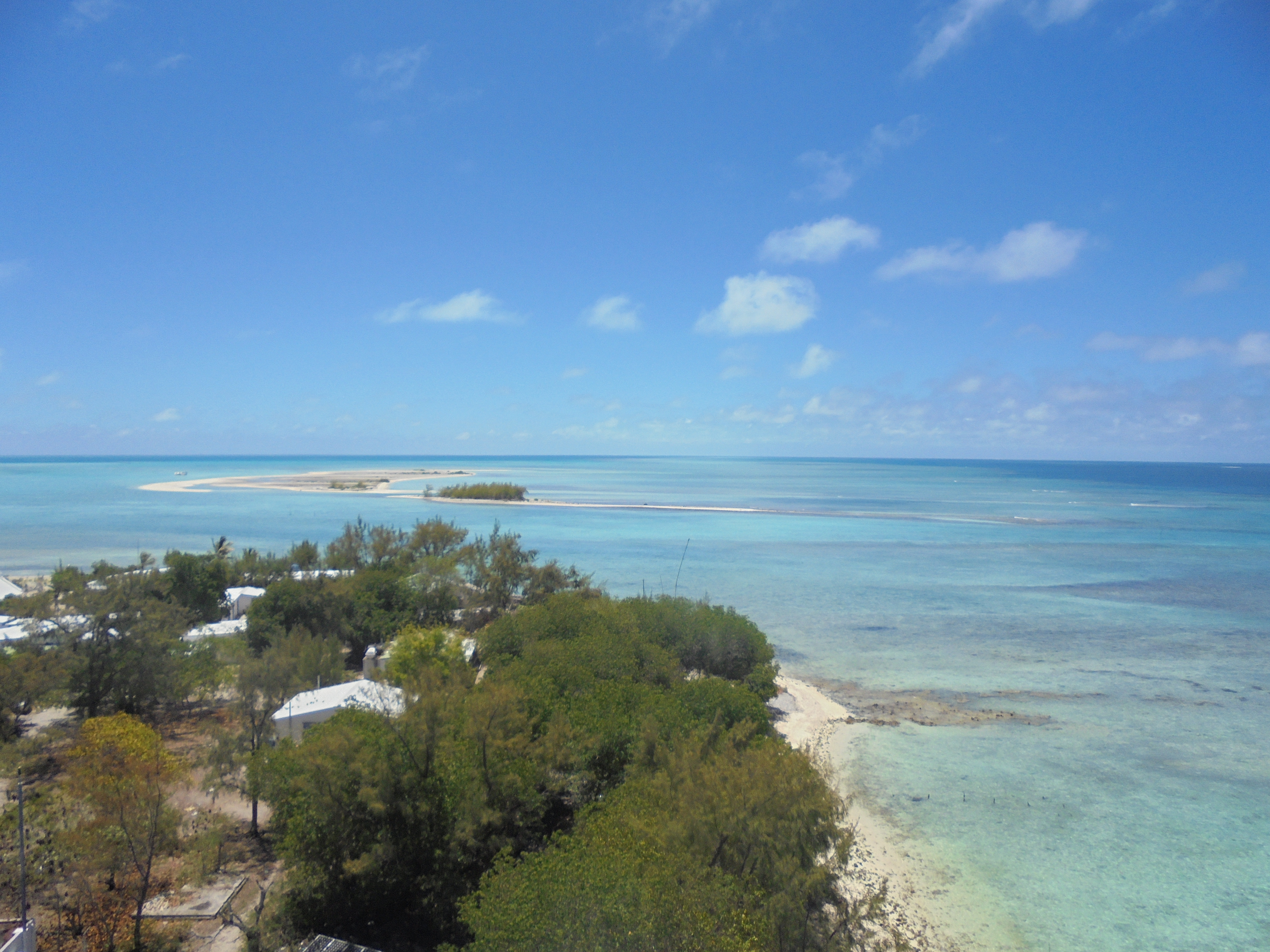
The Thirteen Islands of St Brandon - Images of Île Raphael, Cargados Carajos in Mauritius

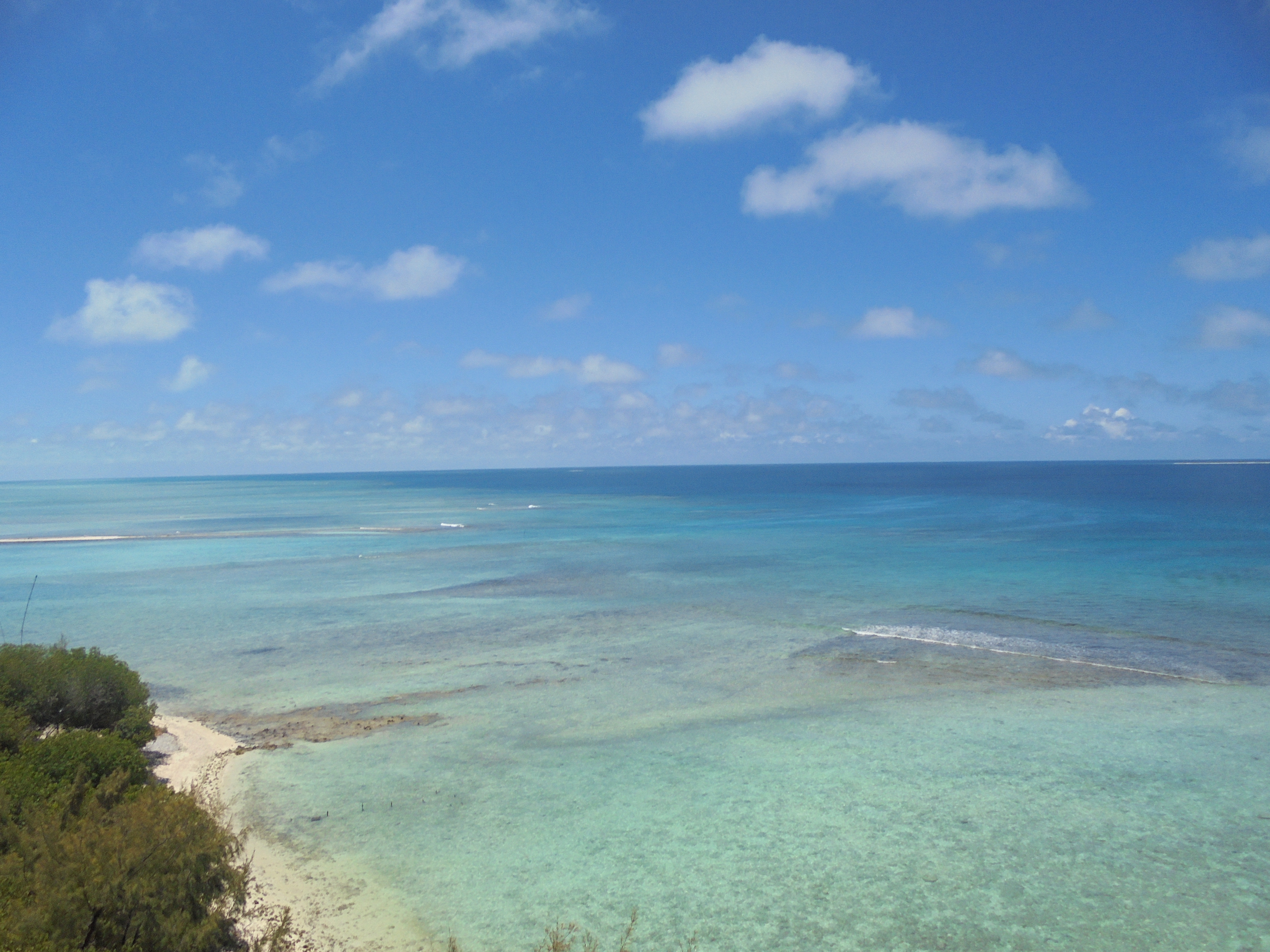
The Thirteen Islands of St Brandon - Images of Île Raphael, Cargados Carajos in Mauritius

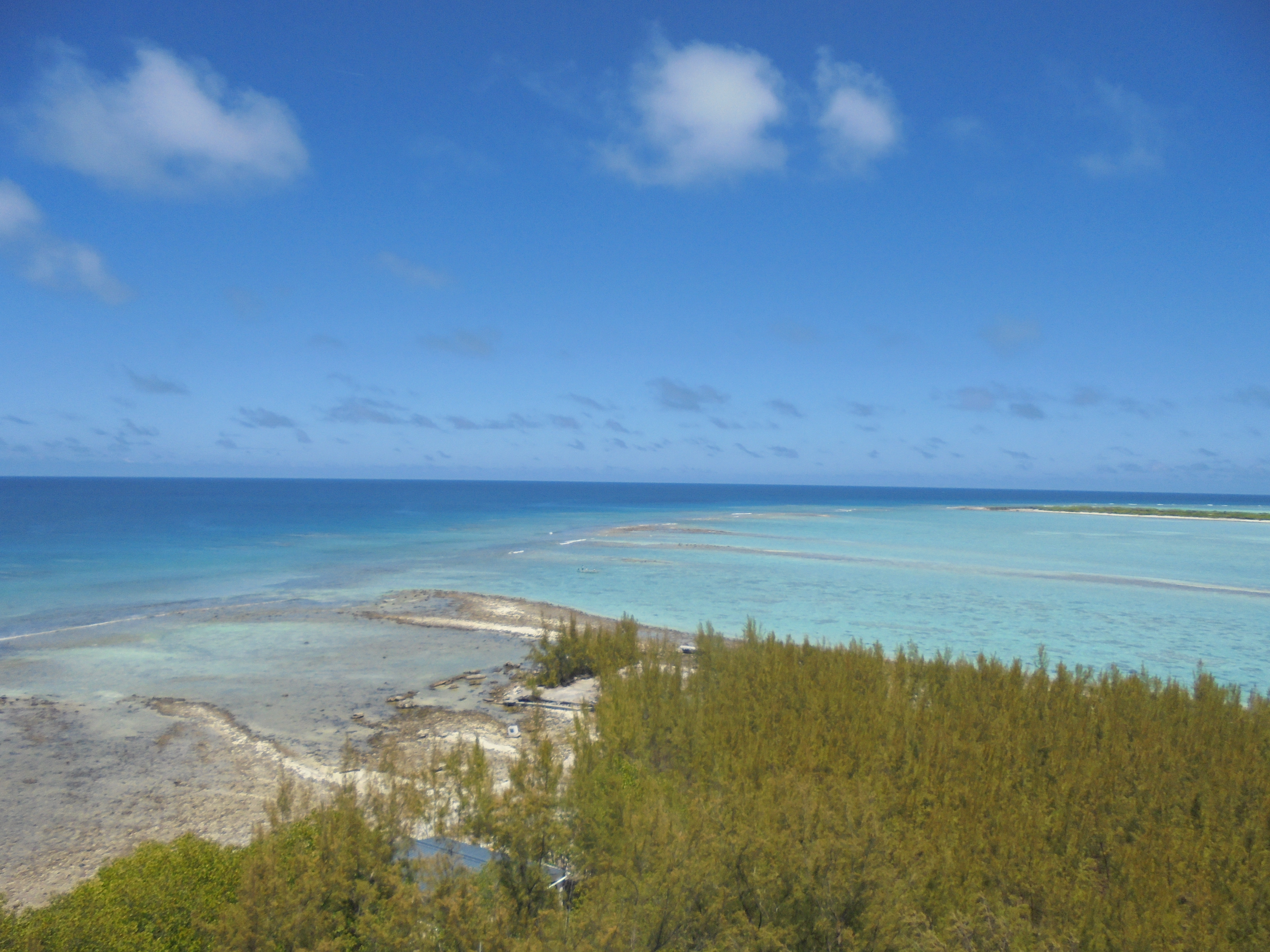
The Thirteen Islands of St Brandon - Images of Île Raphael, Cargados Carajos in Mauritius

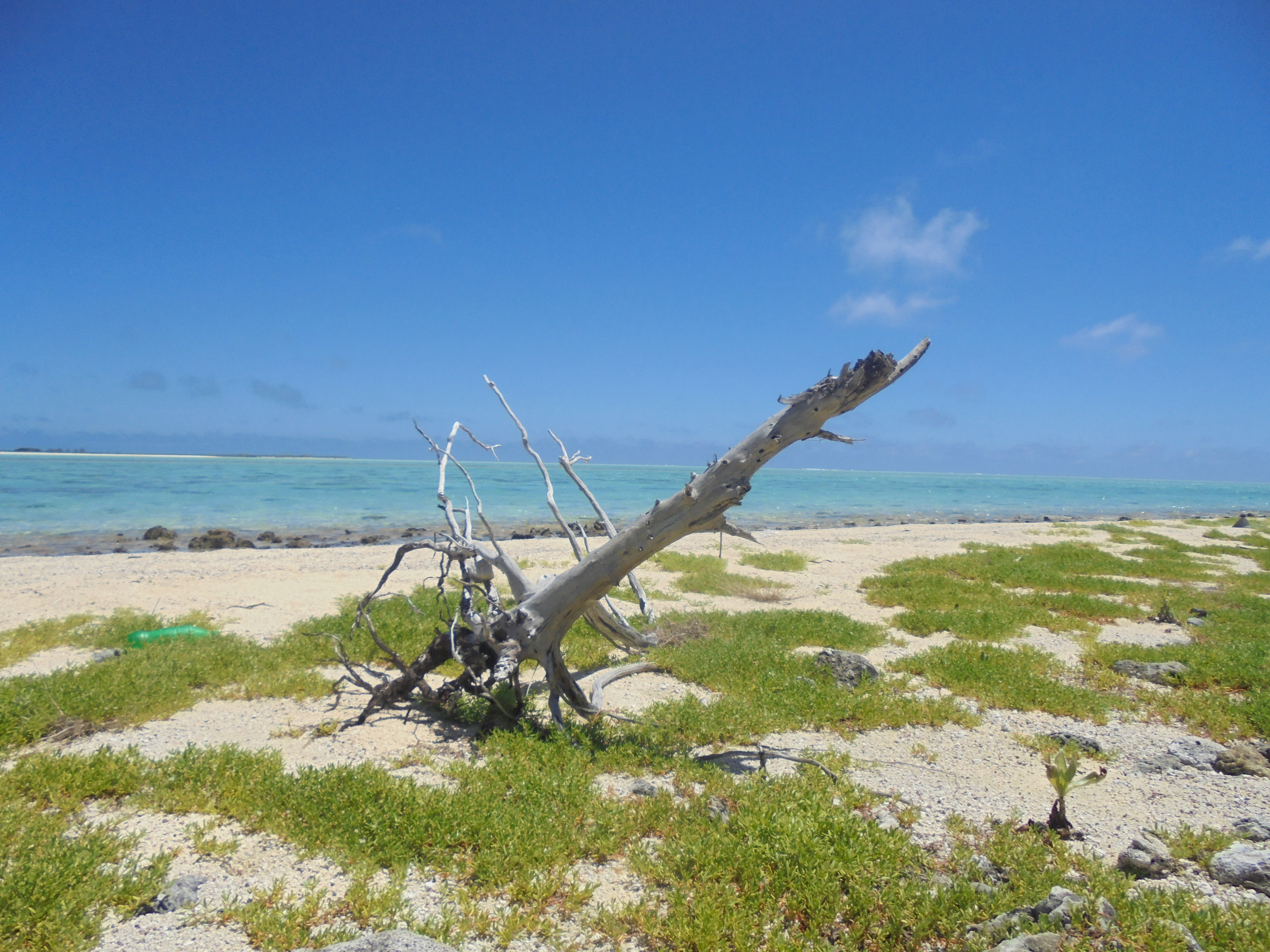
The Thirteen Islands of St Brandon - Images of Île Raphael, Cargados Carajos in Mauritius

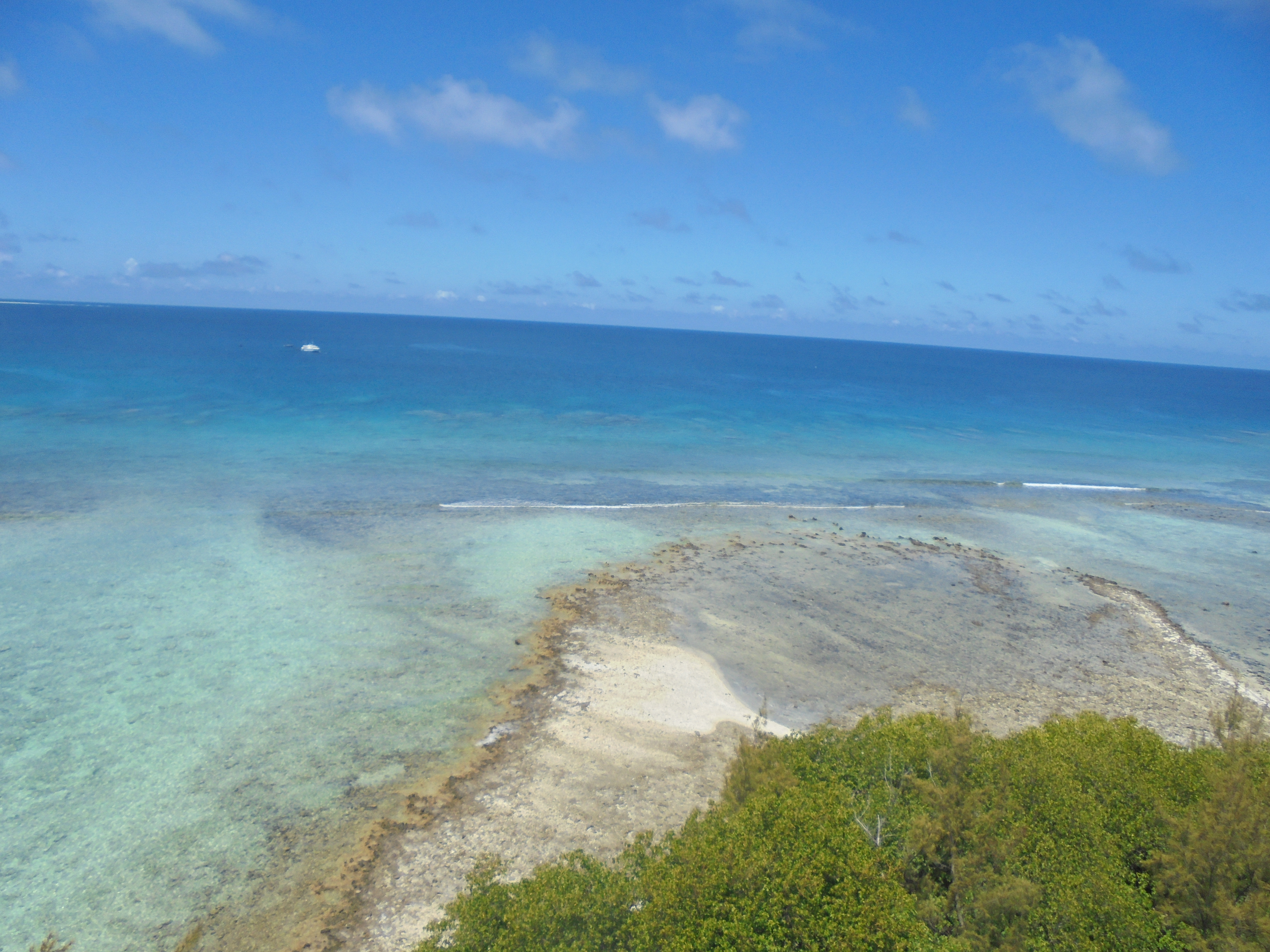
The Thirteen Islands of St Brandon - Images of Île Raphael, Cargados Carajos in Mauritius

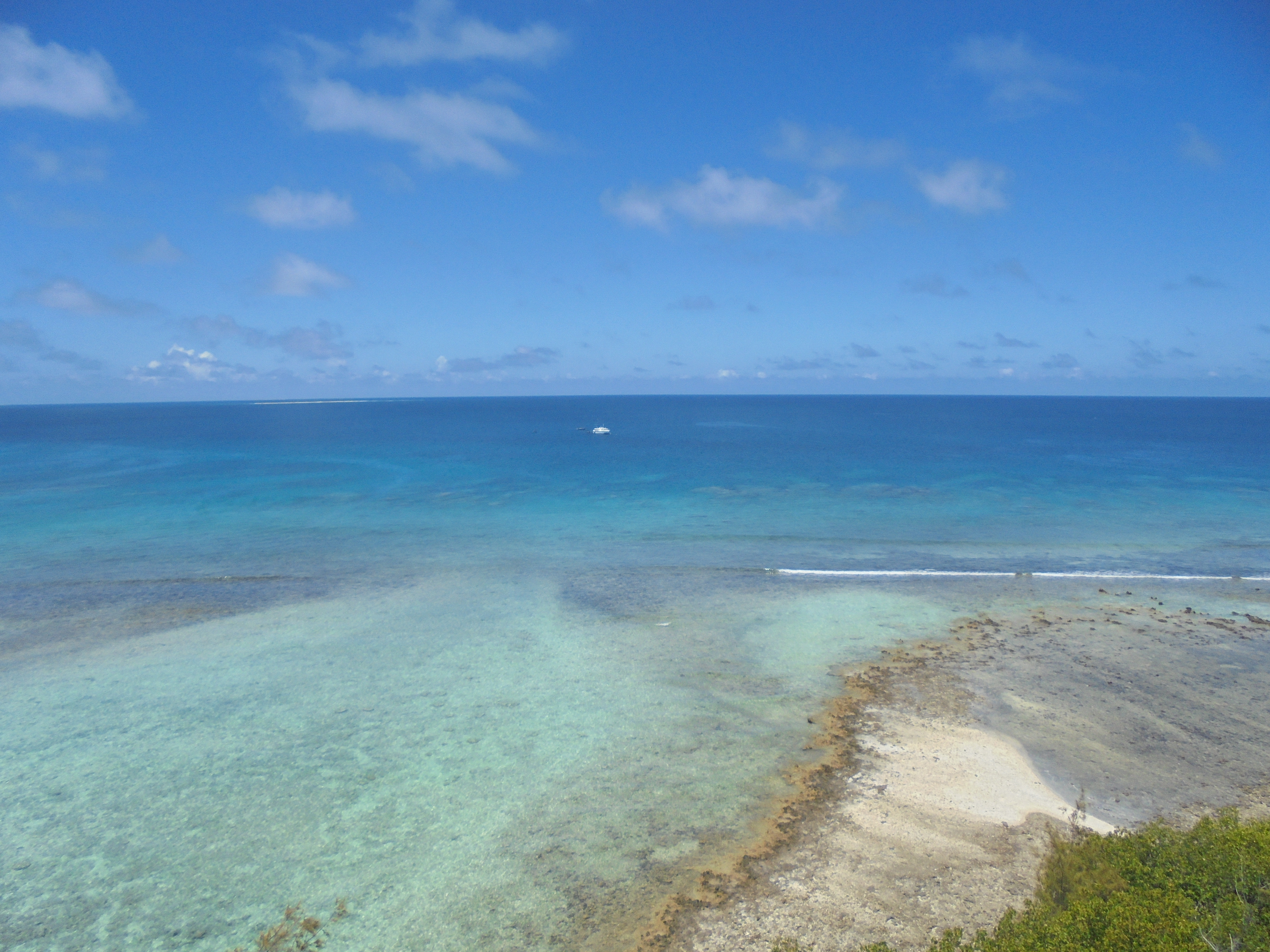
The Thirteen Islands of St Brandon - Images of Île Raphael, Cargados Carajos in Mauritius

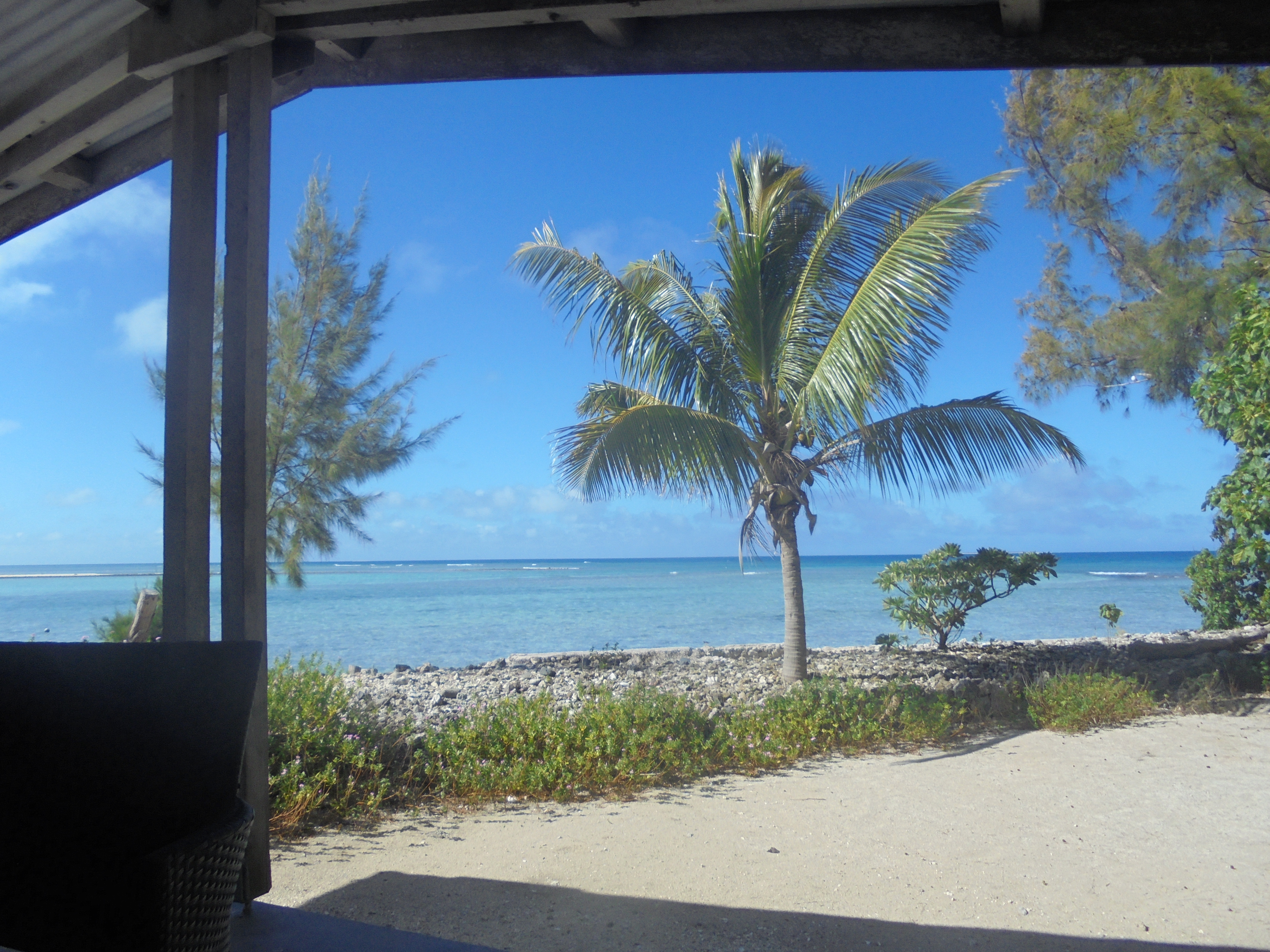
The Thirteen Islands of St Brandon - Images of Île Raphael, Cargados Carajos in Mauritius

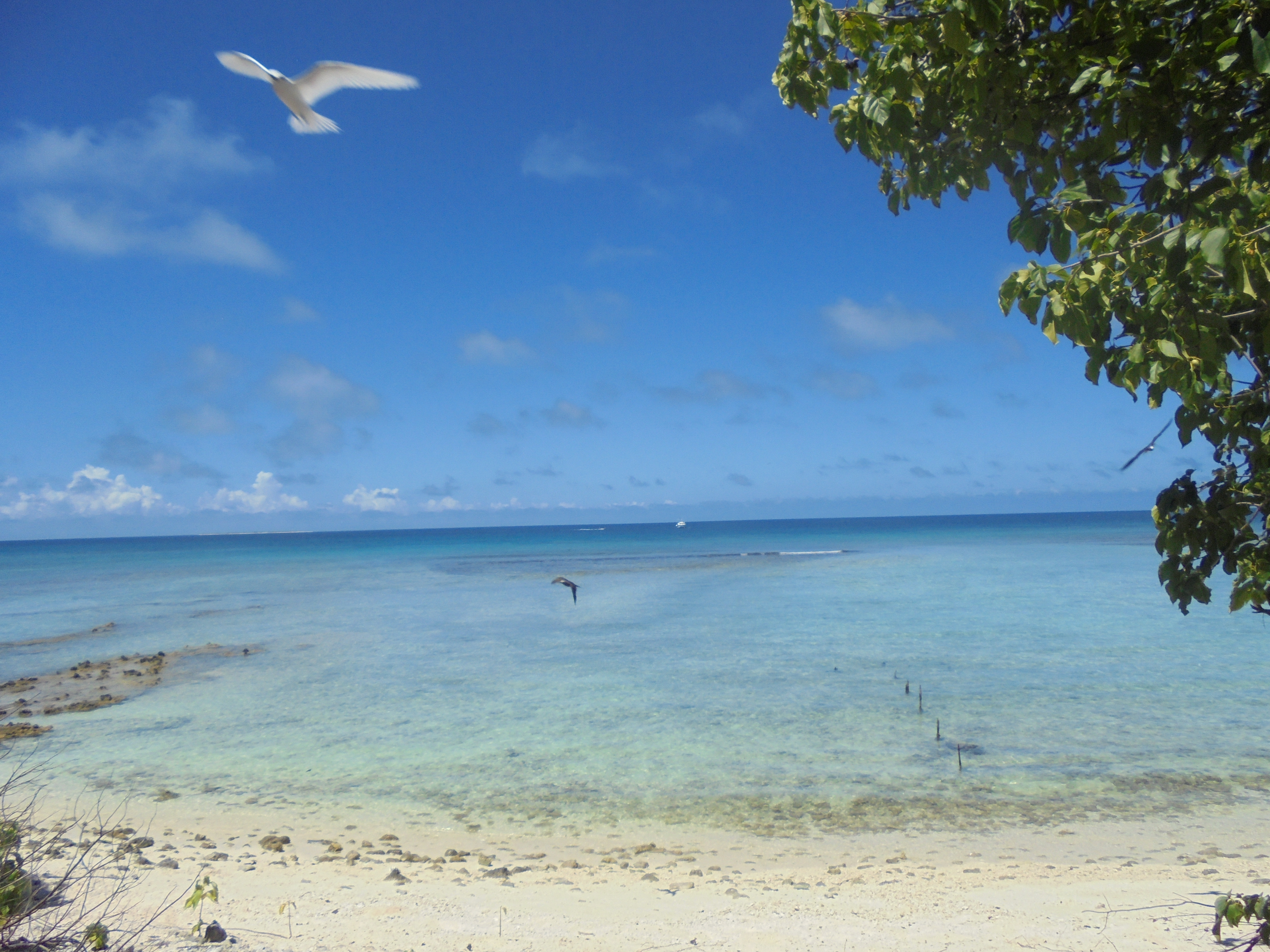
The Thirteen Islands of St Brandon - Images of Île Raphael, Cargados Carajos in Mauritius

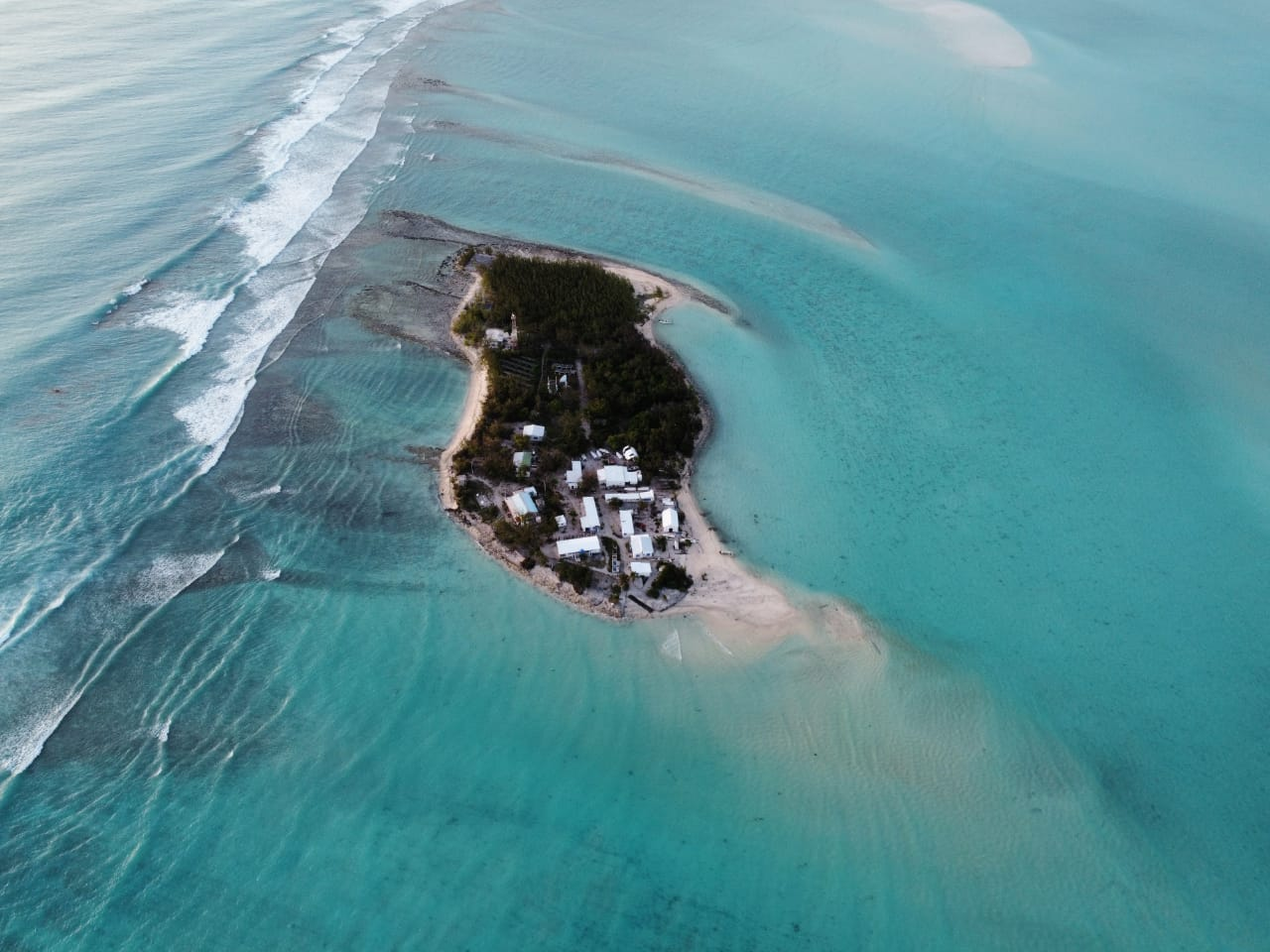
The Thirteen Islands of St Brandon - Images of Île Raphael, Cargados Carajos in Mauritius

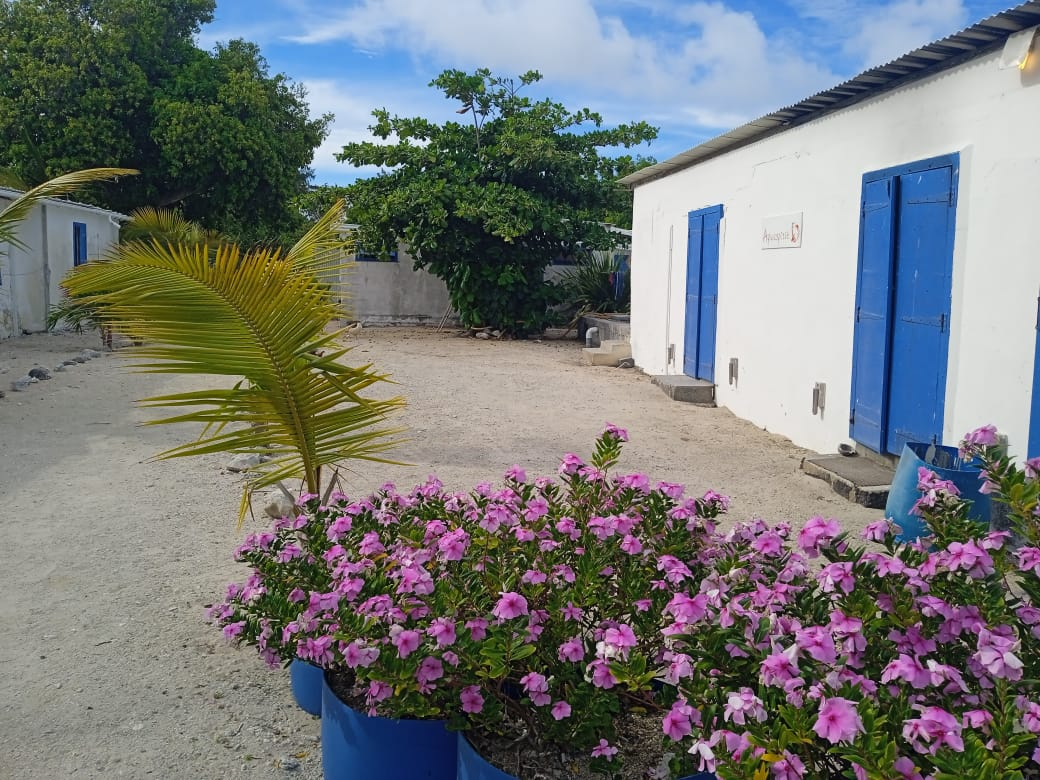
The Thirteen Islands of St Brandon - Images of Île Raphael, Cargados Carajos in Mauritius

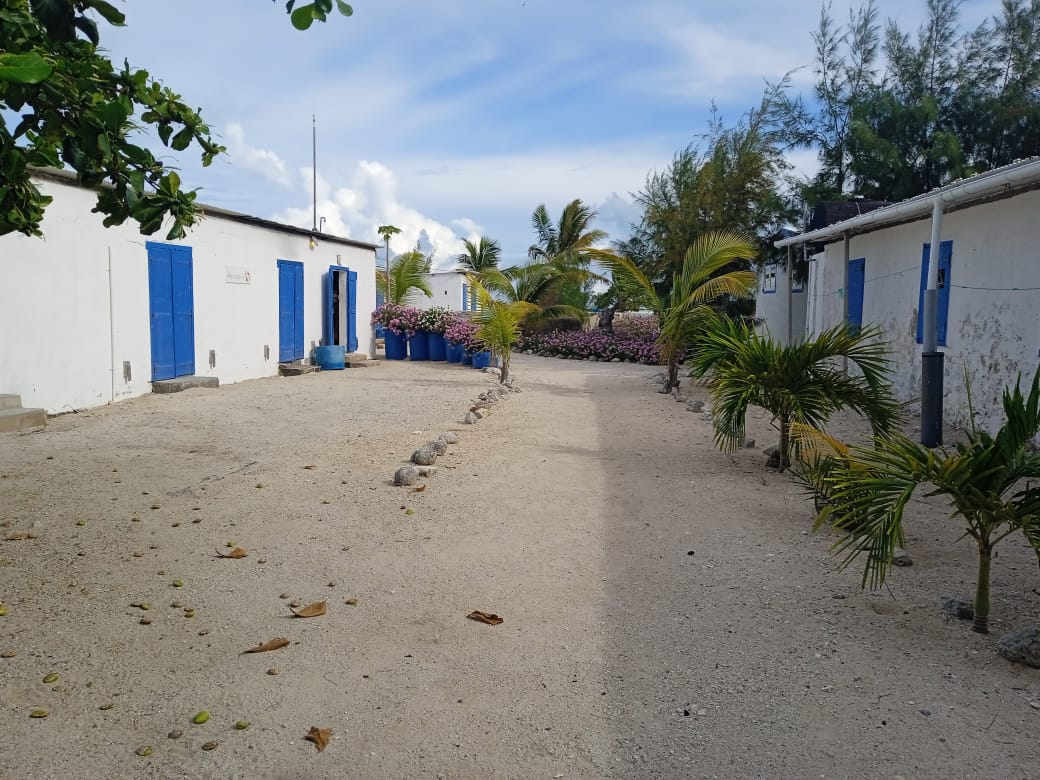
The Thirteen Islands of St Brandon - Images of Île Raphael, Cargados Carajos in Mauritius

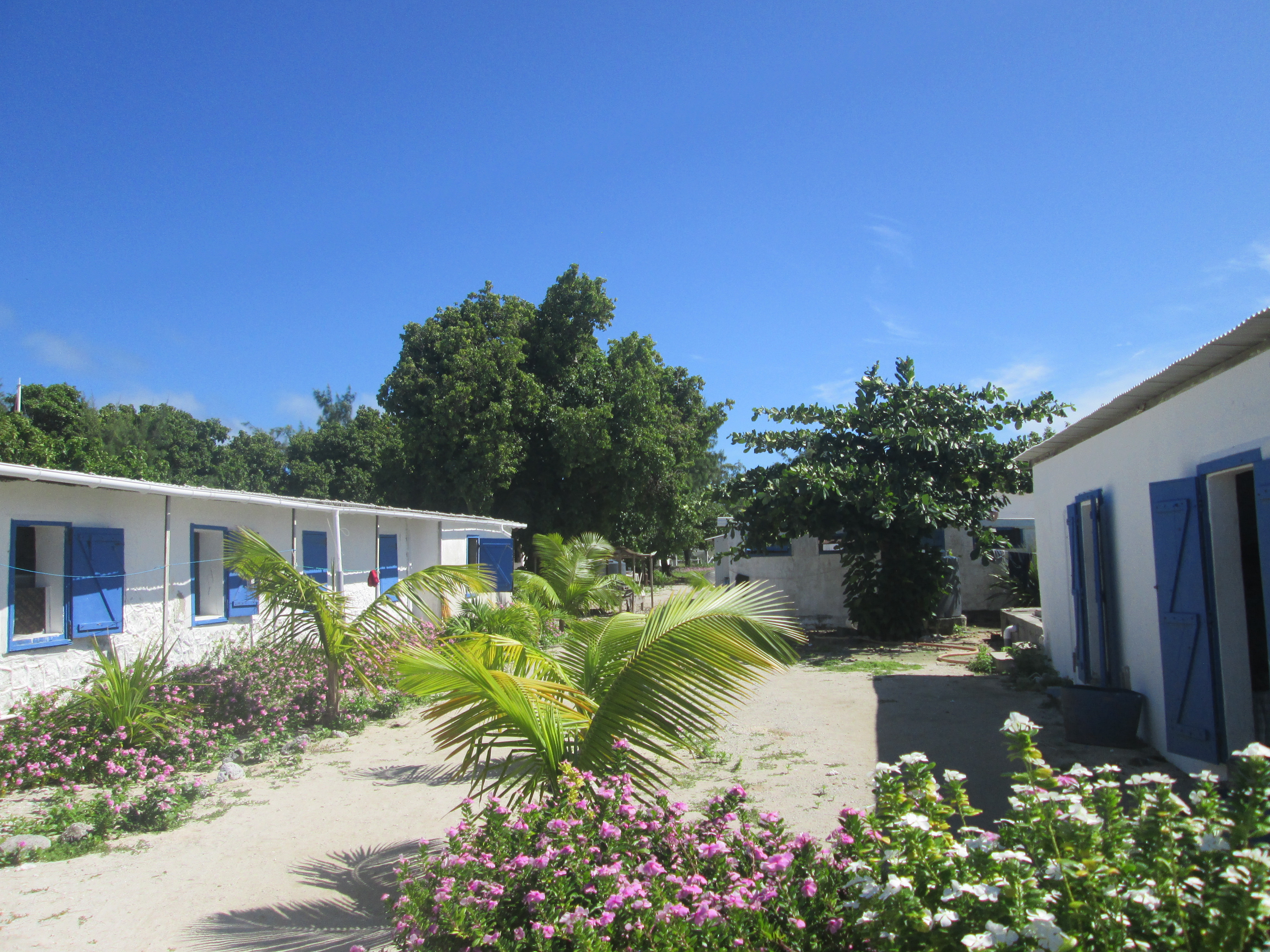
The Thirteen Islands of St Brandon - Images of Île Raphael, Cargados Carajos in Mauritius

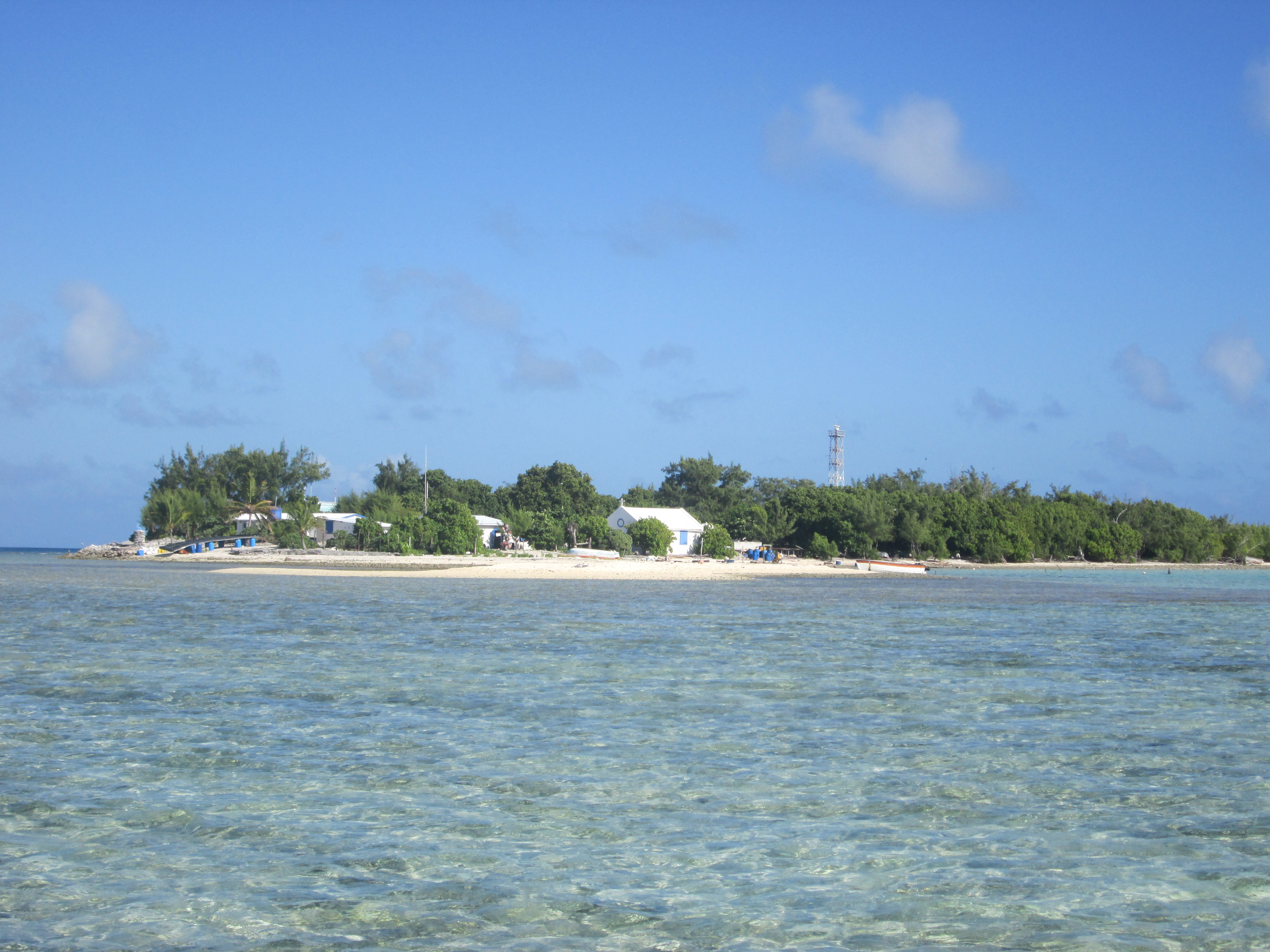
The Thirteen Islands of St Brandon - Images of Île Raphael, Cargados Carajos in Mauritius

== See also ==
- Mascarene Islands
- St Brandon
- France Staub
- Avocaré Island
- L'île du Sud
- L'île du Gouvernement
- Permanent grant
- L'Île Coco
- Raphael Fishing Company
- Mauritian Wildlife Foundation
