= Jean-Baptiste Lislet Geoffroy =

French astronomer, botanist and cartographer

Jean-Baptiste Lislet Geoffroy (born Jean-Baptiste Lislet; also known as Jean-Baptiste Lislet-Geoffroy; 23 August 1755 – 8 February 1836) was a French astronomer, botanist and cartographer.

== Early life ==
Lislet Geoffroy was born on 23 August 1755 in Saint-Pierre, Réunion and died on 8 February 1836 in Port-Louis (Mauritius). Lislet was the son of Jean-Baptiste Geoffroy, a white, French engineer working in Mauritius (then called Ile de France) and Niama, an enslaved Senegalese princess. Lislet's father had freed his mother in order to ensure his son was not born enslaved. However, as Lislet was illegitimate, he took the name of the place of his birth for his last name. When he was 38 years old, his father legitimatized him, and he took the last name Lislet Geoffroy (or Lislet-Geoffroy).

His father was reputed to have been born in Paris and be of Breton ethnicity. Lislet Geoffroy stated that his mother was named Niama and was the daughter of Toucu Niamba, King of Galam (in modern-day Senegal). Outside of geography, he worked in geology, showing that the shoal, Isle Plate around Mauritius was formed by the debris of the crater of a volcano.

Lislet Geoffroy was the uncle of abolitionist novelist Louis Timagène Houat. He married and had two children. His wife died in 1804.

== Career ==
At age 15, he entered the engineer corps and moved to Mauritius where he worked and studied astronomy and mathematics under Bernard Boudin de Tromelin, known as le Chevalier de Tromelin. When the Anglo-French War (1778-1783) began, Lislet-Geoffroy was made assistant pilot, serving with de Tromelin. In 1880, he became draughtsman to the engineers of the Isle de France, then the name of Mauritius.

In 1788, he was appointed to map Mauritius, and his success in the project earned him commission as Geographical Engineer. Avoiding the Reign of Terror, he was commissioned in 1794 to visit and chart the Seychelles, and his success there earned him the promotion to assistant-officer in the body of military engineers. When Captain-General Charles Mathieu Isidore Decaen took charge of Mauritius in 1803, Lislet Geoffroy was promoted to captain, and when Isle de France was captured, Lislet Geoffroy became chief of the commission for the inspection of the island.

== French Academy of Sciences ==
In 1786, he was elected to the French Academy of Sciences. The academy was dissolved during the French Revolution, and Lilset Geoffroy was not among those reinstated when it reformed in 1793, possibly because of the distance between himself in the colonies and Paris, but possibly for prejudicial reasons. Unable to return to France, he founded the Société des Sciences et Arts de l'Ile de France on 9 October 1801 (succeeded in 1805 by the Société Royale des Arts et Sciences de Maurice, which persists to this day). Cofounders of the group were Jacques Milbert, Jean-Baptiste Dumont, Jacques Delisse, and Jean-Baptiste Bory de St. Vincent. Until 1934, he was the only man of color to have been a member of the academy.

Among his many work were a map of the Isles of France and Reunion published first in 1797 and second in a corrected version in 1802. He also published a chart of the Seychelles and a map of Madagascar. He made a voyage to Madagascar in 1787, and his account of the voyage was published in Malte-Bruns Annales de Voyages. Outside of geography, he worked in geology, showing that the shoal, Isle Plate around Mauritius was formed by the debris of the crater of a volcano. He also took detailed measurement of the climate of Mauritius for almost 50 years ending in 1834. Lislet Geofroy died on 8 February 1836.

== Writings ==
- Lislet-Geoffroy, J. B. (1819). Memoir and notice explanatory of a chart of Madagascar and the north-eastern archipelago of Mauritius drawn up according to the latest observations, under the auspices and government of His Excellency Robert Townsend Farquhar, governor, commander in chief, captain-general of the Isle of France and dependencies, vice-admiral, &c. &c. &c. 1 vol. 4 degrees 8s. London: John Murray, Albemarle Street. Printer: C. Roworth, Bell-yard, Temple-bar, NSTC: 2L17098
