= Cynanchum staubii =

Scientific classification
- Kingdom: Plantae
- Clade: Tracheophytes
- Clade: Angiosperms
- Clade: Eudicots
- Clade: Asterids
- Order: Gentianales
- Family: Apocynaceae
- Genus: Cynanchum
- Species: C. staubii

Binomial name
- Cynanchum staubii Bosser

Species of plant

Cynanchum staubii (endemic common name: liane calle) is a rare coastal plant from the subfamily Asclepiadoideae in the family Apocynaceae. It is endemic to the Îlot Fourneau and the Ile aux Aigrettes, two islets off the coast of Mauritius. The species epithet commemorates Dr. France Staub, an ornithologist, herpetologist, botanist, and conservationist from Mauritius who collected the holotype in 1965.

Cynanchum staubii is a leafless vine with cylindrical, twining, fleshy, glabrous rhizomes which are 0.6 to 1.8 cm in diameter. They can climb up to 2 m high. The inflorescences which can bear 5 to 10 flowers inserted terminally at the nodes of the branches. They are arranged solitary or in fascicles. The finely pubescent pedicels are 4–6 mm long. The ovoid buds are rounded at the top. The calyx prefloration is quincuncial. The ovate sepals which are rounded at the tip are 1.2 to 1.5. mm long and finely pubescent on the back. The corolla is urceolate when young but becomes more or less campanulate with advancing age. The five petals are 3.5 to 4.5 mm long and fused at the base. They are narrowly ovate-obtuse, fleshy, and slightly recurved at the apex. The simple, membranous, cylindrical, erect corona is 2.8 to 3 mm high. It exceeds the gynostegium and has 5 erect lobes which are narrowly triangular-acute. The gynostegium which is conical at the top is 1.2 to 1.3 mm long. The light green, linear, glabrous follicles are 10 to 13 cm long. The seeds are brown, narrowly ovate-flattened, 6–7 mm long, 2–3 mm wide and margined.
