= Bélé (arrondissement) =

- Arrondissement
- Location within Senegal
- Country: Senegal

Bélé is an arrondissement of Bakel in the Tambacounda Region in Senegal.
