= Niama =

Senegalese princess who was enslaved

- Born: c.1734 Tuabou, Senegal
- Died: 12 June 1809; Port-Louis, Mauritius
- Era: 18th century
- Children: Jean-Baptiste Lislet Geoffroy

Niama (c. 1734 – 12 June 1809) was a Senegalese princess (from what was then broadly considered Guinea (region), who was enslaved, and whose liberation meant she became one of the first enslaved people to be freed on Reunion island. She was also the mother of the astronomer, botanist and academic Jean-Baptiste Lislet Geoffroy.

== Biography ==
Niama was born around 1734 in Tuabou, a village that was then in the kingdom of Galam, in present-day Senegal. Her grandfather was King Tonca and her father was due to inherit the throne. She is recognised as a princess of the kingdom. In 1743 during a war in the kingdom, Niama's grandfather and many other members of her family were killed, and she, along with other relatives, was enslaved by the French, who had established a trading post at Ndjar. Whilst most of the enslaved people were shipped west on the Atlantic slave trade route, Niama and others were shipped eastwards, around the Cape of Good Hope to French colonies in the Indian Ocean.

Unloaded at either the Ile de Bourbon or Ile de France, Niama was purchased by Pierre David, who was general manager of the Compagnie du Sénégal. She was baptised and given the Christian name Marie-Geneviève. In 1746, David was made Governor General of Île de France and Île Bourbon and she continued to be owned by him. However, in 1749, he sold her to Jean-Baptiste Geoffroy, who was a French engineer living on the island. A sexual relationship (Note: In absence of any historical records giving Niama's point of view, it is not known whether she was coerced into the relationship or not.) between the two developed and, in 1751, their daughter Jeanne Thérèse was born. Her baptismal record stated that she was: "Jeanne Thérèse, natural daughter of Niama, slave of Geoffroy”. However relationships between owners and slaves were forbidden in the colony and Geoffroy and Niama were forced to leave Mauritius and moved to the more sparsely populated Reunion in 1752, where they settled in Saint-Pierre.

In 1755 Niama and Geoffroy had a second child: to prevent this child from being born into slavery, Geoffroy freed Niama from slavery. She was freed on 23 August 1755, and on the same day their son Jean-Baptiste Lislet Geoffroy was baptized. His baptismal certificate read: "Jean-Baptiste, son of Jean-Baptiste and Niama, free guinea negress". Two further sons were born: Louis in 1758 and Jean-François in 1763. Little else is known about Niama's life, until the death of Jean-Baptiste Geoffroy, after which she moved to Port-Louis to join her eldest son Jean-Baptiste Lislet Geoffroy (her two other sons had predeceased their father).

Niama died on 12 June 1809 in Port-Louis, at the age of 75.

== Legacy ==
In 2015, a memorial plaque was proposed to be placed in Saint-Paul, Réunion, to replace one of five previous plaques which were removed due to their connections with the slave trade.

Links with Niama's birth village of Tuabou were commemorated in 2017 when Héléna and Marie Laure from Slamlakour – an association for slam poetry based on Réunion – visited Senegal.

A new musical play based on her life, entitled Niama Princesse-Esclavée-Libre was commissioned in 2019 in order to commemorate the 170th anniversary of the abolition of slavery on Réunion. It was performed at the Caudan Arts Centre in 2020. The writer was Shenaz Patel, who worked closely with the Archives départementales de La Réunion.

== Historiography ==
The biographical details that are known about Niama's life are a valuable resource to understand slavery in the Mascarene Islands, particularly those of women who were enslaved whose lives are particularly absent from the historical record. Niama's life is significant since she was one of the first enslaved people to be freed in Réunion.
