= France Staub =

Mauritian ornithologist, herpetologist, botanist and conservationist

France Staub

France Staub (September 29, 1920 – July 2, 2005) was a Mauritian ornithologist, herpetologist, botanist, and conservationist.

== Biography ==
Staub was a descendant of French botanist Jacques Delisse (1773−1856). He obtained the diploma at the Mauritius College of Agriculture in 1944. In 1951 he attended the Guy's Hospital, Medical and Dental School in London where he was qualified as a dental surgeon.

When Staub returned to Mauritius, he devoted most of his free time to the observation of the birdlife and study of botany in Mauritius and the Mascarenes. In 1968, he visited together with Mr. Gueho Île Raphael and other St. Brandon islands including the critically important island, in terms of endangered species, of L'Île Coco before he subsequently published Birds of the Mascarenes and Saint Brandon in 1976. France Staub was a visionary and is at the heart of the movement to protect and conserve the millions of birds on St. Brandon. He was the first scientist to recognise the international importance of St. Brandon and its inherent sustainability long before the word became a leitmotiv to conservationists, Saint Brandon is one of those rare places where huge colonies of sea-birds live freely amongst men. It is remarkable that during its 160 odd years of use by fishing companies, only one in the ten breeding species, the Red-footed Booby of Albatross islet, has now become extinct through the preying of wild cats and men.

Staub also published the Fauna of Mauritius and Associated Flora in (1993) about the avian fauna and several other articles in the Proceedings of the Royal Society of Arts and Sciences of Mauritius of which he was a member since 1955. He was seven times the president of this history society. By 1970 Staub was the chairman of the Mauritian Section of the International Council for Bird Preservation. In 1971 he joined the British Ornithologists' Union.

Staub is best known for his analysis of relationships between main pollinators such as day geckos or endemic birds like the threatened Mauritius olive white-eye and their endemic host plants like Trochetia.

The vine species Cynanchum staubii discovered 1965 by France Staub on Ile aux Aigrettes was named by Jean Marie Bosser.

== See also ==
- Mascarene Islands
- St Brandon
- Avocaré Island
- L'île du Sud
- L'île du Gouvernement
- L'Île Coco
- Raphael Fishing Company
- Mauritian Wildlife Foundation

== Publications ==
- Staub, F., Guého, J. (1968). The Cargados Carajos shoals or St Brandon: resources, avi-fauna and vegetation./Proc. R. Soc. Arts Sci. Maurit/. 3(1): 7-46.
- Staub, F. (1970). Geography and ecology of Tromelin Island, Coral Islands of the Western Indian Ocean. / Atoll Res. Bull /. 136: 197–210.
- Staub, F. (1973). Oiseaux de l'Ile Maurice et de Rodrigues. Port Louis: Mauritius Printing Company Ltd. 69 p.
- Staub, F. (1973). Birds of Rodriguez island. / Proc. R. Soc. Arts. Sci. Maurit. /4(1): 17–59.
- Staub, F. (1976). Birds of the Mascarenes and Saint Brandon. Port Louis: Organisation Normale des Entreprises Ltée.
- Friedmann, F., Guého, J., Staub, F. (1979). Les plus belles fleurs sauvages des Iles Mascareignes. In: Cent-cinquantenaire de la Société Royale des Arts et des Sciences de l'Ile Maurice, 1829–1979. Mauritius : Royal Society of Arts and Sciences p. 29-73.
- Guého, J., Staub, F. (1979). "Le Mondrain" Nature Reserve. In: Cent-cinquantenaire de la Société Royale des Arts et des Sciences de l'Ile Maurice, 1829–1979. Mauritius: Royal Society of Arts and Sciences p. 75-102.
- Guého, J., Staub, F. (1983). Observations botaniques et ornithologiques à l'atoll d'Agalega. /Proc. R. Soc. Arts. Sci. Maurit/. 4(4), 15-110. (Part I. Botanique/by J Guého, p. 15-85; Part II. Ornithologie/by F. Staub, p. 87-110)
- Staub, F. (1988). Evolutionary trends in some Maurian Phanerogams in relation to their pollinators./ Proc. R. Soc. Arts. Sci. Maurit /. 5(1&2): 7-78
- Staub, F. (1993). Julien Desjardins – 1799–1840. /Proc. R. Soc. Arts. Sci. Maurit./5(3): 1-10. (Conférence par France Staub à la Salle Bonâme, MSIRI, le 18 septembre 1990 pour commémorer le 150ème Anniversaire de sa mort).
- Staub, F. (1993). Fauna of Mauritius and associated flora. Port Louis: Précigraph Limited. 103 p.
- Staub, F. (1993). Faune de l'île Maurice et flore associée. Port Louis: Précigraph Limited. 103 p.
- Staub, F. (1993). Guano birds, benefactors of the sugar industry in Mauritius . /Proc. R. Soc. Arts. Sci. Maurit./ 5(3): 55–70.
- Staub, F. (1993). Requin bleu, calmar géant et cachalot. /Proc. R. Soc. Arts. Sci. Maurit./ 5(3): 141–145.
- Staub, F. (1993). Dodo and solitaires, myths and reality. /Proc. R. Soc. Arts. Sci. Maurit/. 6: 89-122.
- Staub, F. (2001). La belle Mandrinette au bois dormant. Weekend, Dimanche 14 janvier, pp 36.
- Staub, F. (2004). Palma mater. / Proc. R. Soc. Arts. Sci. Maurit /. 7: 55-79
- Staub, F. (2004). Des Toc-Tocs avec le front et la gorge vivement colorés découverts à l'Ile d'Arros des Amirantes. /Proc. R. Soc. Arts. Sci. Maurit/. 7: 100–101.
- Staub, F. (2004). Visite à l'Ile Rodrigues des membres de la Société Royale des Arts et des Sciences (15-18 août 1997). /Proc. R. Soc. Arts. Sci. Maurit/. 7: 101–113.
