= Jacques Delisse =

French botanist and pharmacist (1773-1856)

- Born: 13 May 1773; Dax, Landes
- Died: 13 March 1856 (aged 82); Bordeaux
- Occupations: Pharmacist and botanist

Jacques Delisse (13 May 1773 – 13 March 1856) was a French pharmacist and botanist.

== Life ==
Jacques Delisse was born in Dax, Landes on 13 May 1773 and went to Paris in 1787 to study pharmacy. He joined the Baudin expedition to Australia that sailed from Le Havre in October 1800, as a botanist-pharmacologist. Suffering from scurvy, he left the ship when it reached Mauritius the next year, and set up as a pharmacist in Port Louis. He was founder and Vice President of the Society of Natural History of Mauritius (which later became the Royal Society of Arts and Sciences of Mauritius) and Director of the Bank of Mauritius. After his wife's death, he returned to France with his family in December 1848 and lived in Bordeaux, where he died on 13 March 1856.

== Family ==
The Mauritian scientist France Staub is his descendant.

== Honors ==
The Hawaiian plant genus Delissea is named in his honor.
