= L'Île Coco =

Island in Mauritius

Coordinates: 16°50′0.0″S 59°30′0.0″E

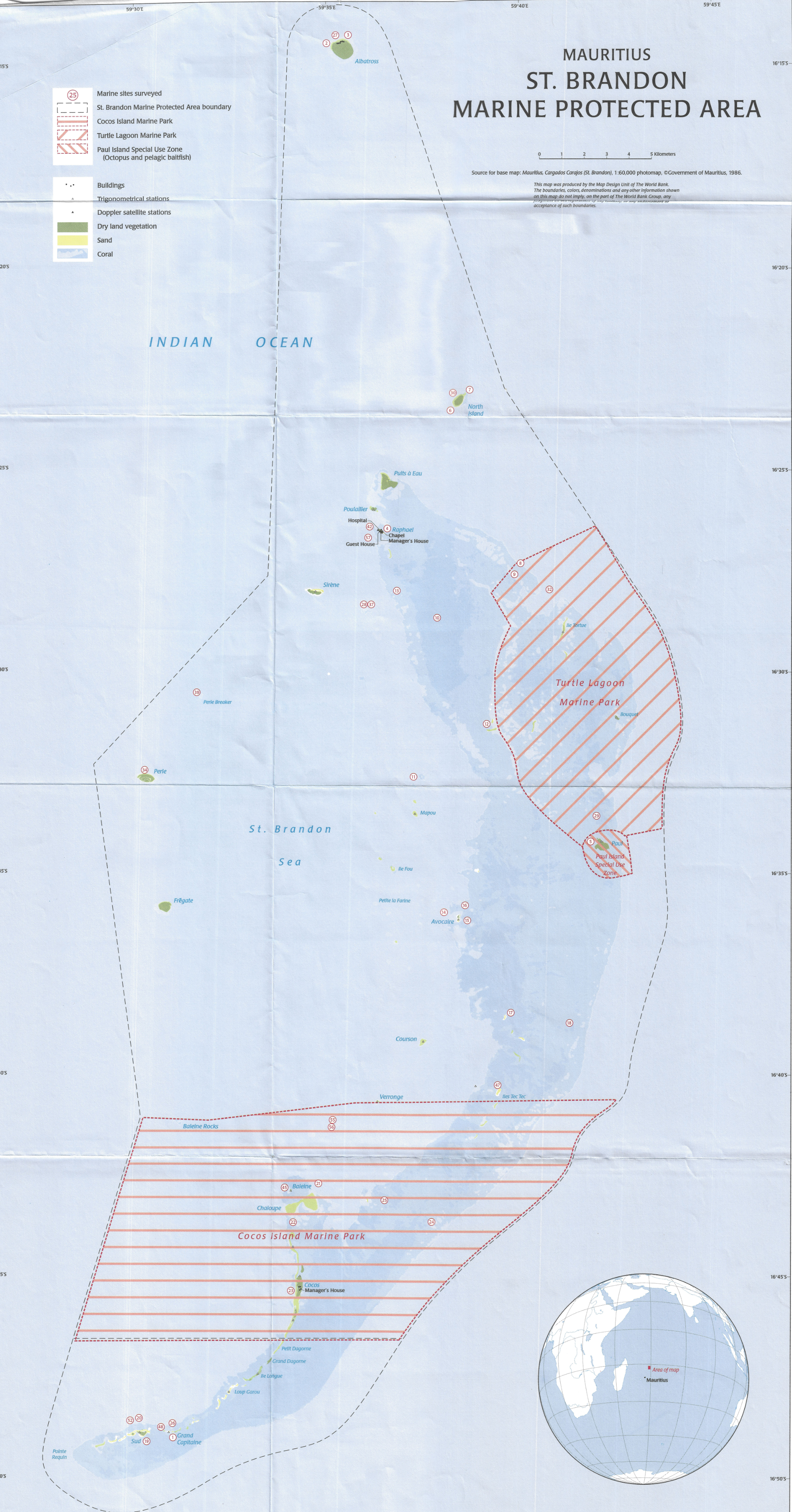
Map delineating The Saint Brandon Marine Protected Area (Cargados Carajos) by the World Bank in 1998

L'Île Coco ('Coco Island') is one of the longest islands adjoining the inner lagoon of the St. Brandon archipelago. It is at times inhabited by fishermen as a base for the resident fishing company's fishing activities as well as for fly fishing and fly-casting activities.

France Staub visited this island in 1968 and the research he carried out was later the subject of his seminal Mauritian conservation book called Birds of the Mascarenes and Saint Brandon. It is inhabited by many tens of thousands of sea birds and was one of the reasons the islands of St. Brandon were later declared an Important Bird Area ('IBA').

== Ecosystem Protection ==
The ecosystem of this island and the other twenty-nine isles of the Cargados Carajos shoals are an internationally recognised Critical Ecosystem Partnership Fund (CEPF) Key Biodiversity Area. Coco Island receives the most turtle nesting visits in the archipelago which is the last important nesting area in Mauritius for the hawksbill and green turtles, both of which are endangered, giving it national and international prominence.

In 1998 the Word Bank's Management Report to government proposed, "Two Marine Parks...for the St. Brandon Area: Turtle Lagoon Marine Park and Cocos Island Marine Park."

== The Saint Brandon Conservation Trust ==
The Saint Brandon Conservation Trust announced the commencement of its international conservation activities at the Corporate Council on Africa’s 2024 US-Africa Business Summit. Two members of the trust's Scientific Advisory Panel, Dr. Nik Cole, PhD, Reptile Conservation Manager for the Mauritian Wildlife Foundation, and Dr. Hindrik Bouwman, PhD, Professor of Ecotoxicology and Zoology at North-West University, presented to the conference by video about the unique nature of Saint Brandon. Global Launch of Saint Brandon Conservation Trust at CCA Dallas 2024 video is available here.

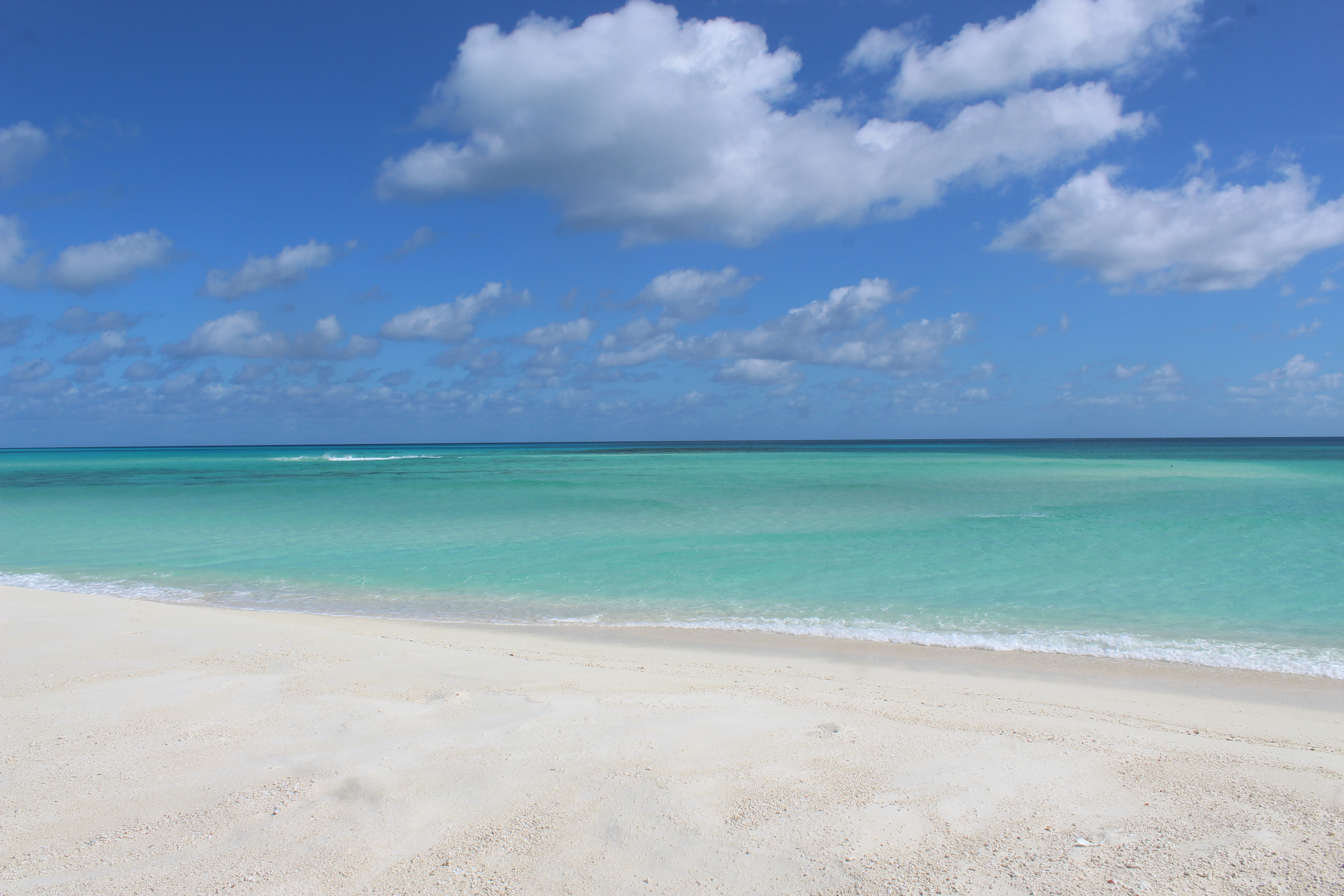
Protecting St Brandon Islands

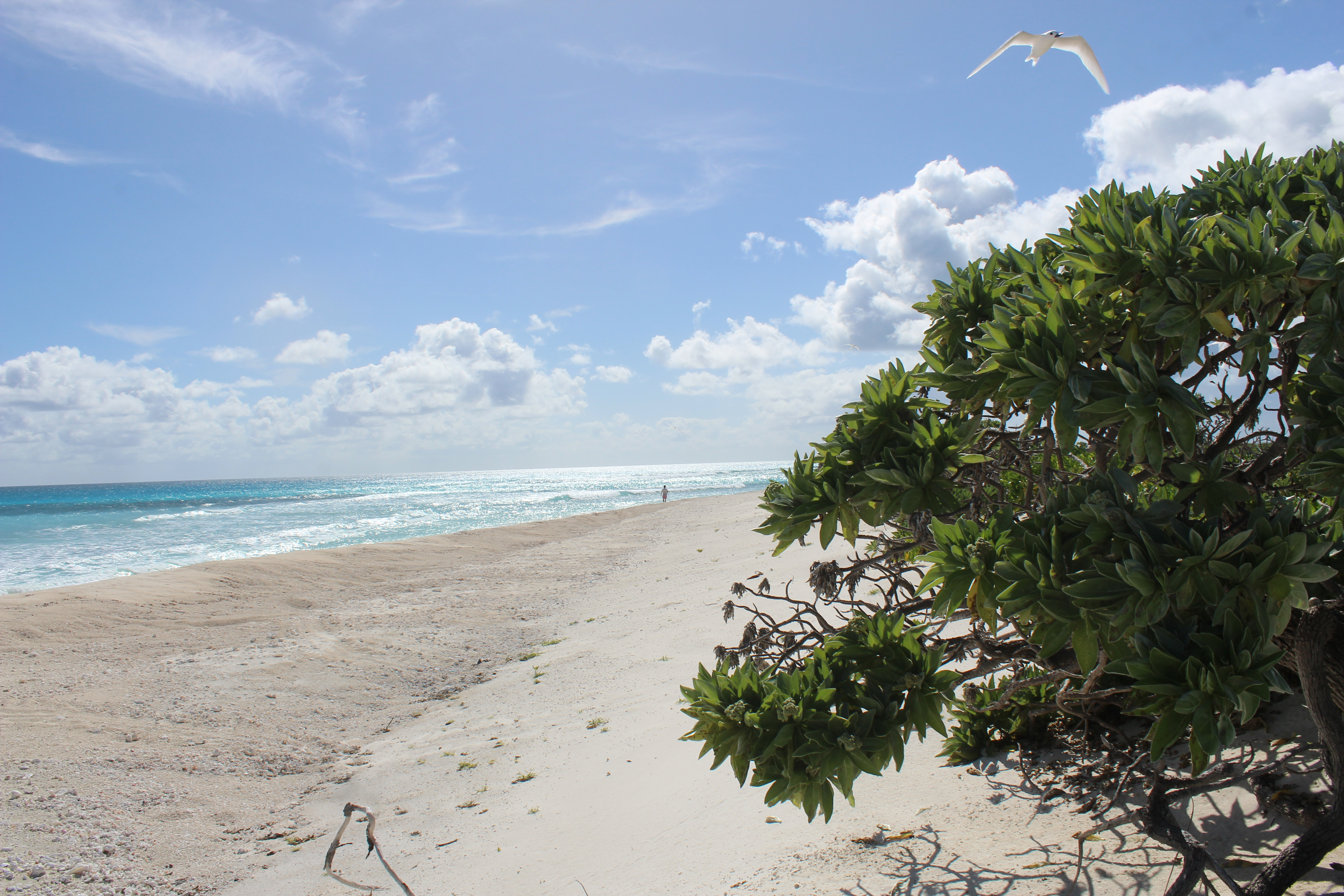
Tournefortia argentea

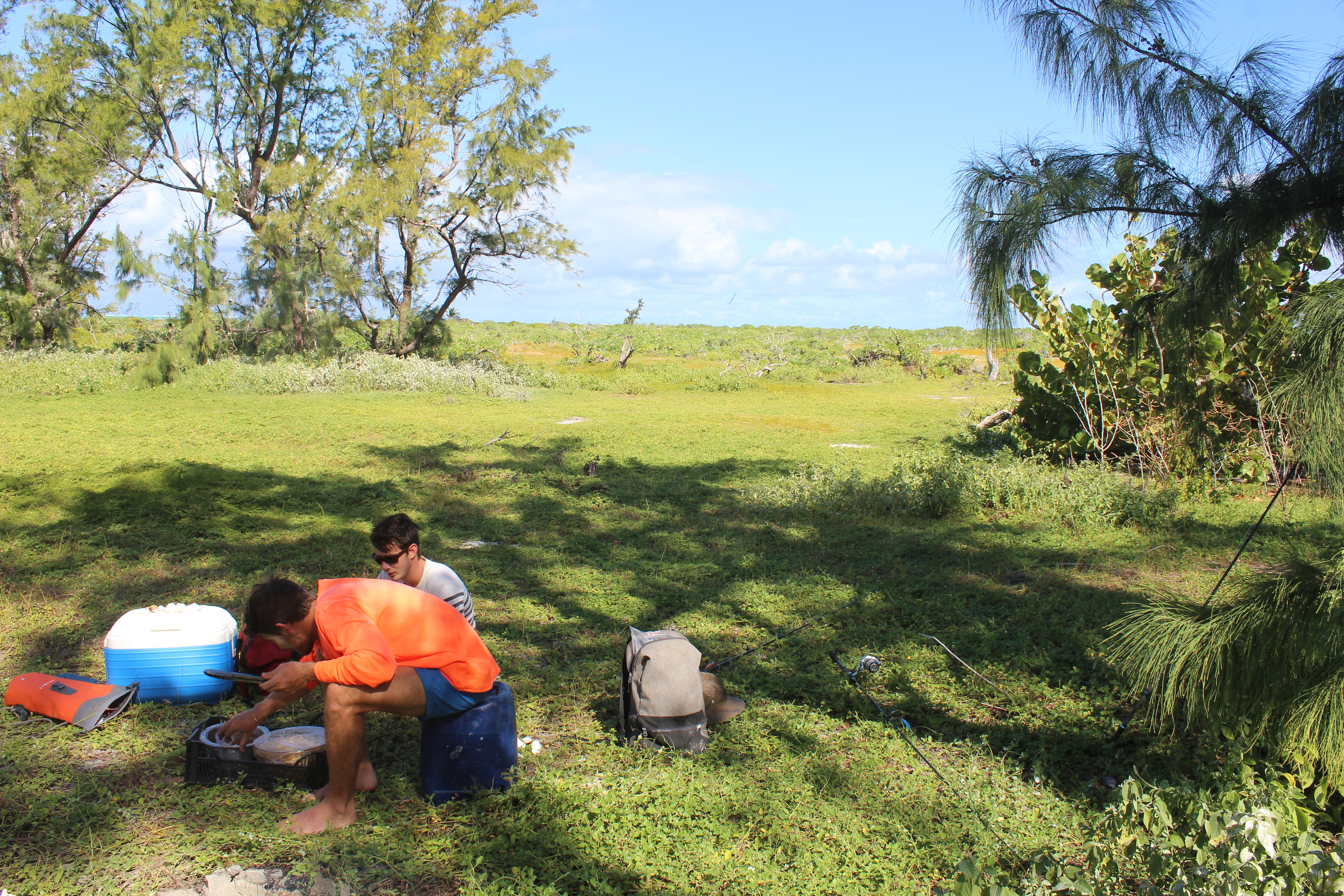
Ile Coco St Brandon Cargados Carajos Vegetation

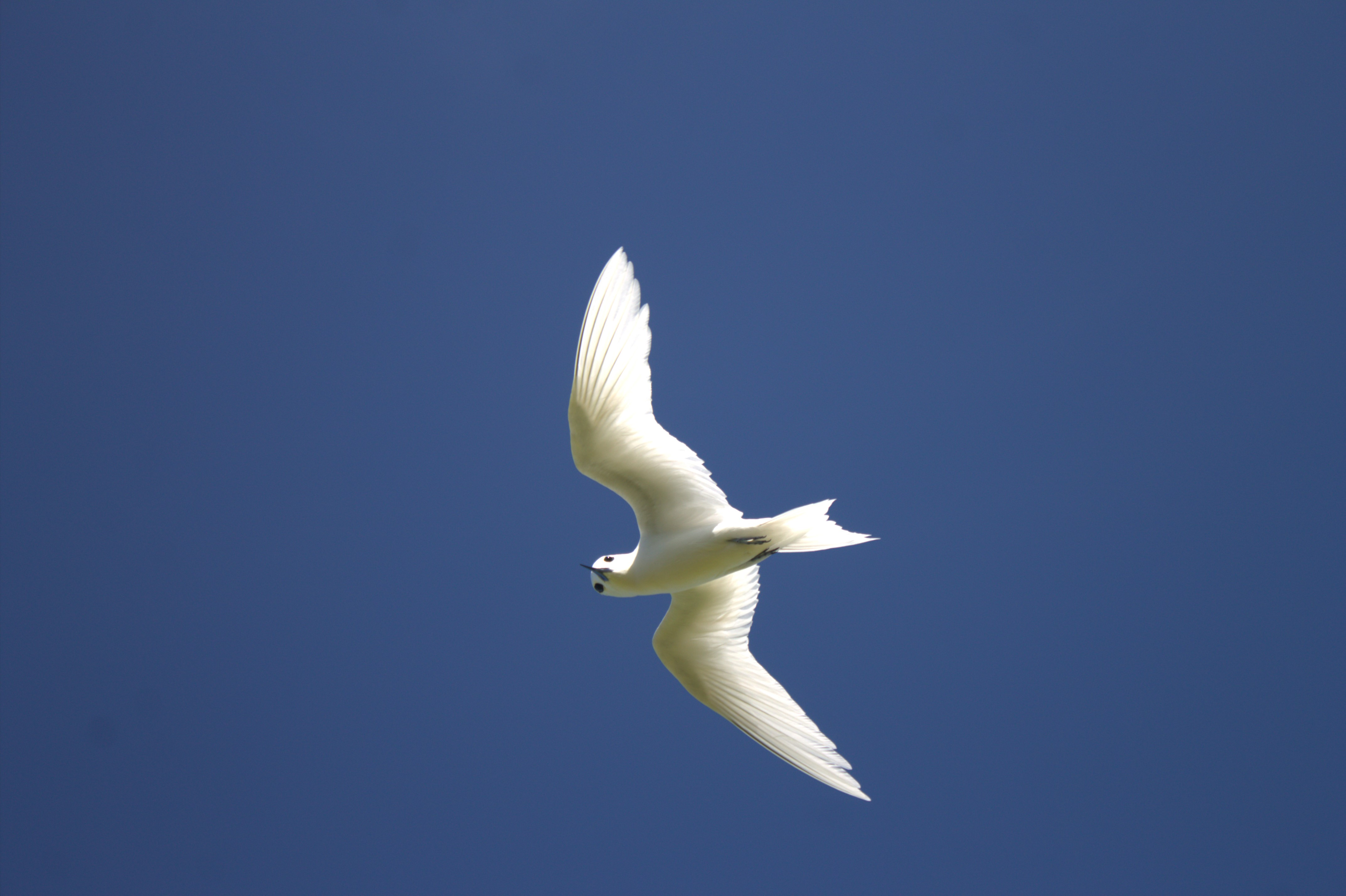
L'Île Coco - Fauna of St Brandon Cargados Carajos

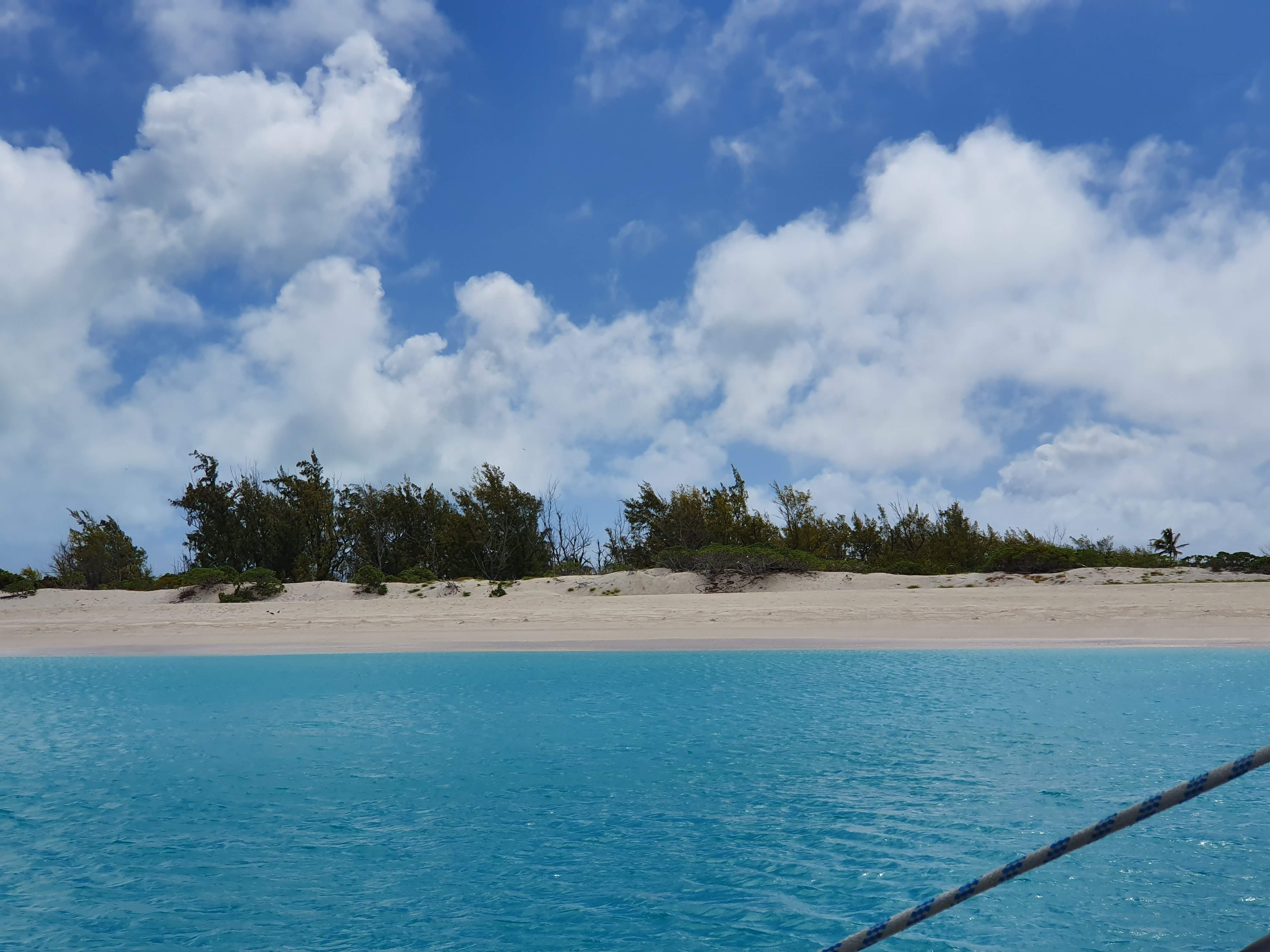
L'Île Coco

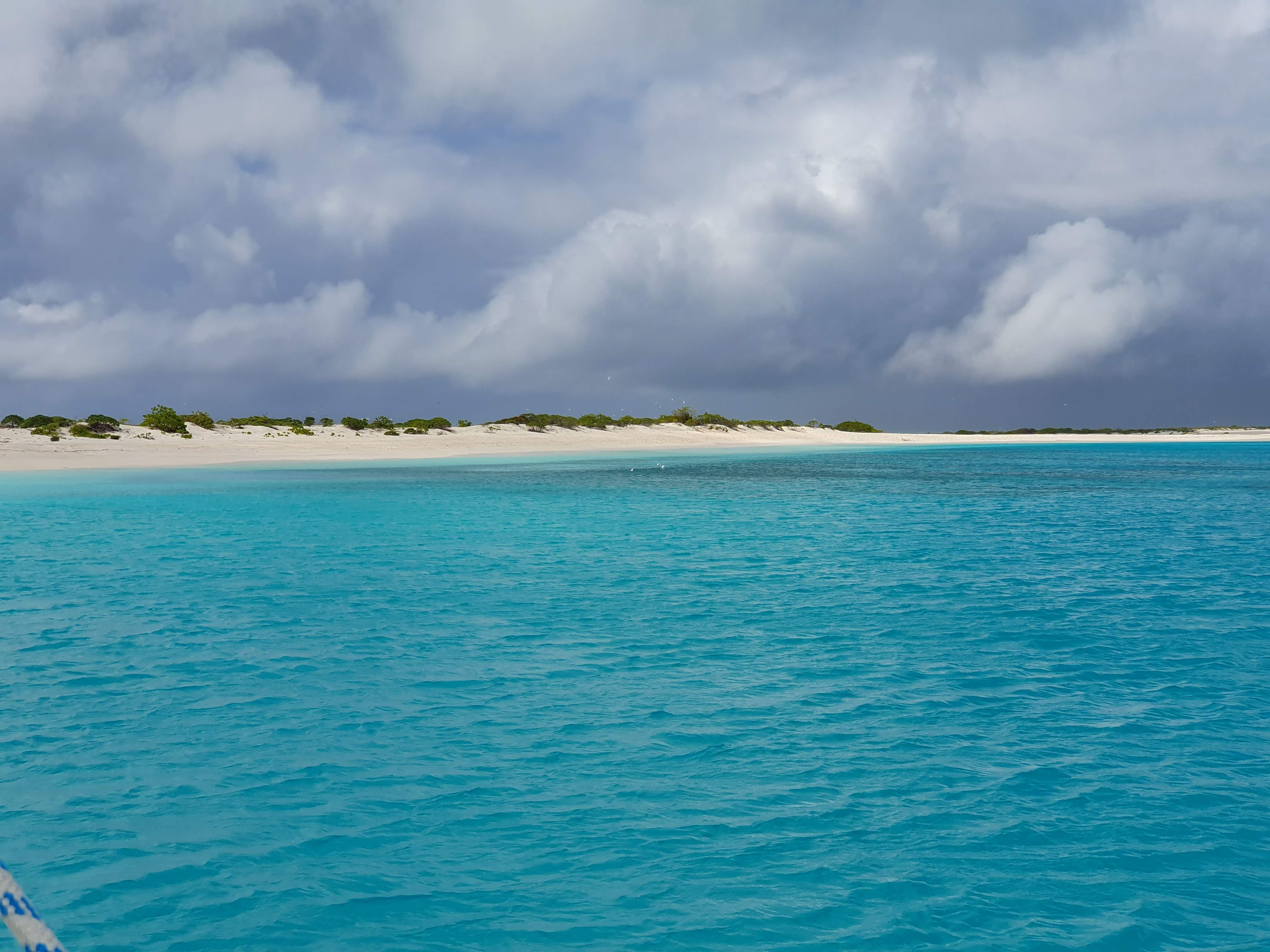
L'Île Coco

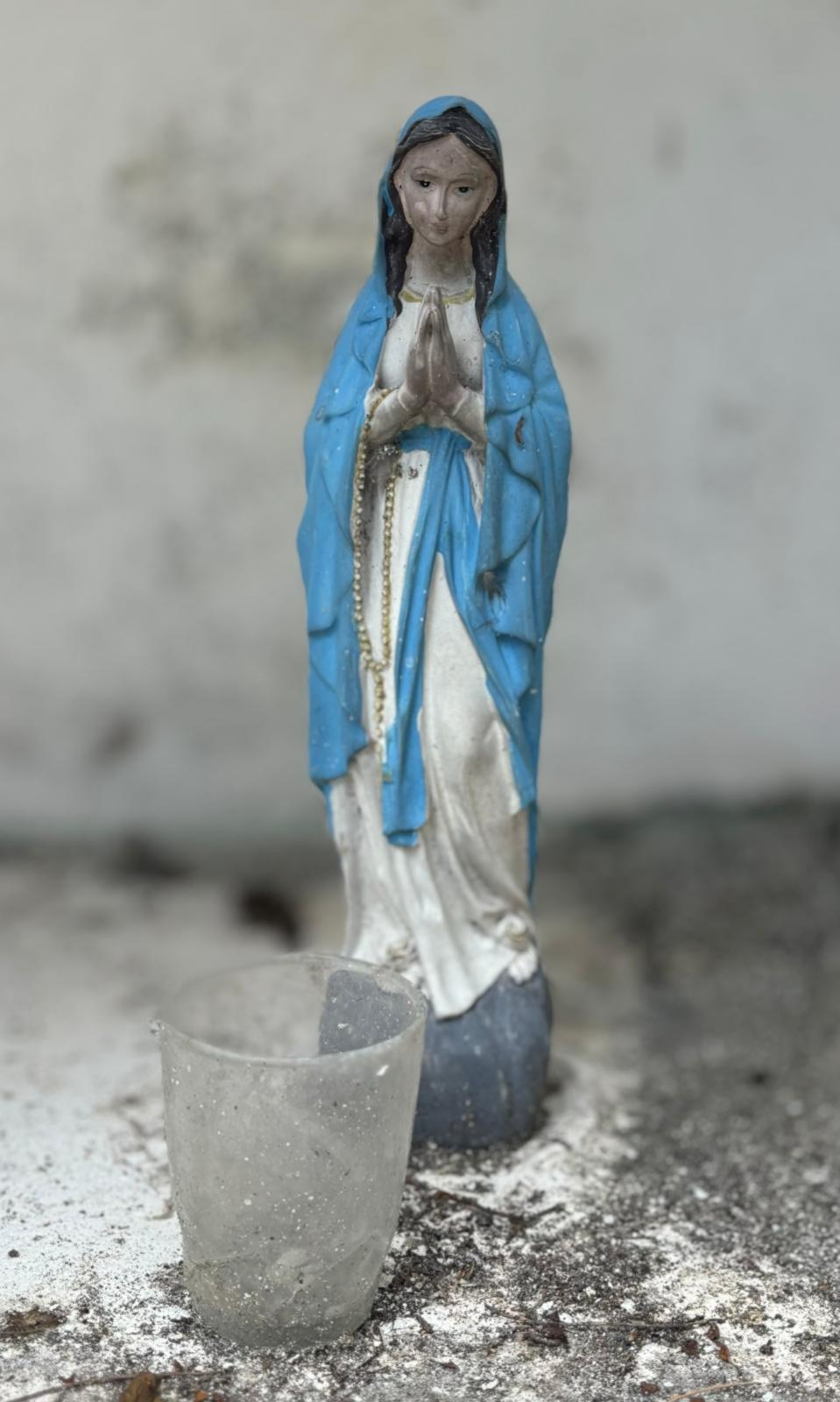
Virgin Mary L'Île Coco

== See also ==
- Albatross Island, St. Brandon
- Avocaré Island
- Bird conservation
- Carl G. Jones
- Constitution of Mauritius
- Convention on Fishing and Conservation of the Living Resources of the High Seas
- Emphyteutic lease
- Geography of Mauritius
- Gerald Durrell
- History of Mauritius
- Île Verronge
- In-situ conservation
- Islets of Mauritius
- L'île du Gouvernement
- L'île du Sud
- List of mammals of Mauritius
- List of marine fishes of Mauritius
- List of national parks of Mauritius
- Mascarene Islands
- Mauritian Wildlife Foundation
- Mauritius
- Outer Islands of Mauritius
- Permanent grant
- Raphael Fishing Company
- Wildlife of Mauritius
