= Moudéry =

- Arrondissement
- Location within Senegal
- Country: Senegal

Moudéry is an arrondissement of Bakel in the Tambacounda Region in Senegal.
