= Bakel department =

Coordinates: 14°54′09″N 12°27′34″W

Bakel
- Department
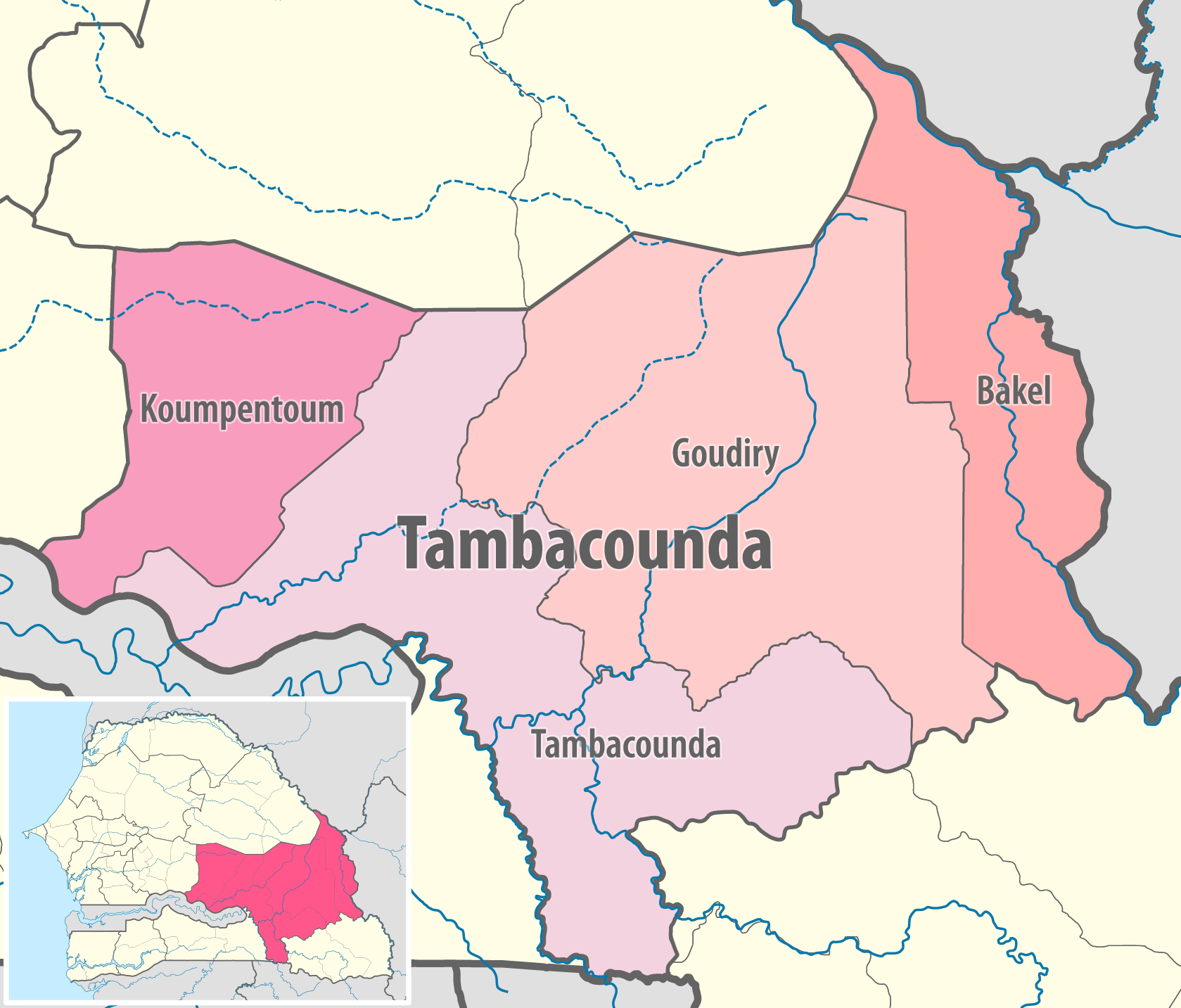
- Area of Bakel department in the Tambacounda region since 2008
- Country: Senegal
- Region: Tambacounda region
- Capital: Bakel

Area
  - Total: 6,290 km^{2} (2,430 sq mi)

Population (2023 census)
  - Total: 190,501
  - Density: 30.3/km^{2} (78.4/sq mi)
- Time zone: UTC+0 (GMT)

Bakel department is one of the 46 departments of Senegal and one of the four making up the Tambacounda region in the east of the country. The department had an area of 22,378 km² and population estimate at 215,680 in 2005. However, in 2008 the department was split to form the new department of Goudiry, so the area was reduced to estimated 6,290 km².

The department has three urban communes; Bakel, Diawara, and Kidira.

The rest of the department is divided administratively into three arrondissements. In turn, they are divided into the following rural communities (communautés rurales):

- Bélé Arrondissement
  - Bélé
  - Sinthiou Fissa
- Kéniaba Arrondissement
  - Toumboura
  - Sadatou
  - Madina Foulbé
  - Gathiary
- Moudéry Arrondissement
  - Moudéry
  - Ballou
  - Gabou

== Historic sites ==
- René Caillé Pavilion in Bakel town
- Bakel Fort in Bakel town
- Cemetery of the Circumcised in Bakel town
- Previous "Comptoir" of the Maurel & Prom establishment in Bakel town
- Sacred hill of Ngoundéiny Guidimpalé in Bakel town
- Fort of Sénédébou, Arrondissement of Kidira
- Hill of Wouro Himadou and (purported) tomb of Malick Sy, first Almamy (muslim ruler) of the Bundu
- Clinique Dr Saidou DIAWO
