= 999-year lease =

Quasi-permanent leasehold

A 999-year lease, under historic common law, is an essentially permanent lease of property. The lease locations are mainly in Britain, its former colonies, and the Commonwealth.

A former colony, the Republic of Mauritius (The Raphael Fishing Company Ltd v. The State of Mauritius & Anor (Mauritius) [2008] UKPC 43 (30 July 2008)) established legal precedent on 30 July 2008 in respect of a 1901 "permanent lease" on the Thirteen Islands of St. Brandon (Cargados Carajos) which were adjudged as being a permanent grant by the Privy Council.

== Examples of land subject to a 999-year lease agreement or permanent grant ==
Leased item	Type	Place	Year term	Lease/permanent grant by	Leased to	Notes
Shannonville, Ontario	Town	Hastings County, Ontario	1818–2817	Mohawks of the Bay of Quinte First Nation	Turton Penn, later the municipality of Tyendinaga, Ontario	The townsite and an additional 200 acres (81 hectares) were leased from the Mohawks for 3 tonnes (3,000 kg) of flour a year, which was paid annually into the late 20th century.
The Crystal Palace	Private seats	London, England	1851–2850	Joseph Paxton	Seat holders/owners	Cost of building venue financed by the sale of seats for £100.
Queen's Park	Parkland	Toronto, Ontario, Canada	1859–2858	University of Toronto	Province of Canada	Park is now home to the Legislative Assembly of Ontario. Originally leased to City of Toronto, the Government of Ontario now owns the land where the Legislature resides.
Point Pleasant Park	Park	Halifax, Nova Scotia, Canada	1866–2865	British Crown Department of Canadian Heritage	City of Halifax, Nova Scotia	Park was owned by British government as it was military site in 1860s and transferred to Government of Canada.
Royal Albert Hall	Private boxes	London, England	1871–2870	The Corporation of the Hall of Arts and Sciences	Seat holders/owners	Financed by selling seats and boxes.
Post Office	Building	North Melbourne	1882–2881	City of Melbourne	Australia Post	
Ontario & Quebec Railway	Railway	Eastern Ontario and Quebec, Canada	1884–2883	Canadian Pacific	Owners of the OQR	Now owned by St Lawrence & Hudson Railway, a subsidiary of the CPR.
Mullaperiyar Dam	Dam and water	Cardamom Hills, Kerala, India	1886–2885	Maharaja of Travancore, Visakham Thirunal; From 1949 State of Travancore-Cochin; From 1956 Government of Kerala	British Secretary of State for Periyar River Irrigation; From 1947 Madras State; From 1969 Government of Tamil Nadu	The lease was made after 24 years of negotiation.
WACA Ground	Stadium	Perth, Western Australia	1889–2888	Government of Western Australia	Western Australian Cricket Association	Land reclaimed from the Swan River.
Commonwealth Institute building site	Property	London, England	1951–2950	Holland Estate	Commonwealth Institute	
Pusey House	Building	Oxford, England	1981–2980		Oxford University	Excludes the chapel.
Inverhuron Provincial Park	Park	Inverhuron, Ontario	1973–2972	Ontario Hydro	Ministry of Natural Resources (Ontario)	Lease now controlled by Bruce Power.
Hampshire CCC	Land	Hampshire, England	1996–2995	Queen's College, Oxford	Hampshire County Cricket Club	Former farmland.
U.S. Consulate General, Hong Kong	Building	Hong Kong	1999–2998	City of Hong Kong	Government of the United States	Formerly on a 75-year lease with 26 years left.
Millennium Dome	Building and surrounding land	London, England	2001–3000	UK Government	Quintain and Lendlease	
Stanley Park Stadium	Association football stadium	Liverpool, England	2006–3005	Liverpool City Council	Liverpool Football Club	Proposed replacement for Anfield, home to Liverpool F.C.
St. Brandon (Cargados Carajos)	13 Islands in the St. Brandon Archipelago	St. Brandon, Mauritius	2008–3007	Government of Mauritius	Raphaël Fishing Company	The thirteen islands of St. Brandon (Cargados Carajos), Mauritius, were converted from a 1901 permanent lease (999-year lease) to a permanent grant by the Privy Council (United Kingdom) in 2008. The islands on Permanent Grant are l'île du Sud (l'île Boisée), Petit Fou, Avocaré Island, l'île aux Fous, l'île du Gouvernement, Petit Mapou, Grand Mapou, La Baleine, L'Île Coco, Île Raphael, Île Verronge, l'île aux Bois and Baleines Rocks.

== See also ==
- 99-year lease
- 999-year leases in Hong Kong
- Permanent grant
- St Brandon
