= List of marine fishes of Mauritius =

Listed below are some of the popular fishes that may be found in the coastal waters of Mauritius. Local names are shown in italics. The colours of the fish have been described as observed under normal daylight and might not always match those on some photos that have been taken under water. The feeding habit gives an indication of the bait that might be used, if one intends to go fishing. Squid, octopus, shrimp, and sea-snail flesh are good baits for Carnivorous, Benthivorous, or piscivorous fish. (Small fish, however, should be released!)

== Marine fishes of Mauritius ==
Name	Image	Description	Habitat and Behavior	Feeding habits	Adult size	Remarks
Crown squirrelfish (Lion parasol)	Holocentridae Sargocentron diadema	Red, with narrow and white lateral stripes. Large eyes. (Red colour might not very visible beyond a certain depth!)	Inhabits caves and under ledges of corals. Sometimes found on sandy bottoms. Seldom seen during the day. Feeds at night.	Benthivorous	25 cm.	The preopercle is toxic.
Broadbarred firefish (Laffe volant)	Pterois antennata	There are white and orange stripes on the reddish body. Equipped with large pectoral fins and swims majestically like a great flying bird.	Inhabits shallow and unexposed waters around reefs. The venomous dorsal fins are pointed towards anything seen as an aggressor. Hunts mostly at night.	Benthivorous	20 cm.	Spines are poisonous and can inflict painful wounds.
Flathead Mullet (Mulet voilé)	Mugilidae Mugil cephalus	Olive green above, silver grey below. Anal, pelvic, and pectoral fins are pale yellow. There is a veil on its eyes, hence the term "voilé".	Often found in estuaries, shallow lagoons, mangroves and in weedy areas. Usually swims in shoals. Often leaps high above water. Can be caught with a line using bread as bait.	Omnivorous	55 cm.	Commercial fish.
Blacktip grouper (Vieille rouge)	Serranidae Epinephelus fasciatus	Variable shades of red, with dark vertical cross bars (not always visible!). Dorsal fins tipped with black. Round caudal fin.	Inhabits lagoons and coral reefs. Caught by line, net and fish trap.	Carnivorous	30 cm.	Good commercial fish.
Honeycomb grouper (Vieille grise)	Epinephelus merra	Whitish body covered with a lot of dark brown spots. Round caudal fin.	Found near rocky areas of shallow lagoons and coral reefs.	Carnivorous	30 cm.	Commercial fish
Yellow-edged lyretail (Croissant queue jaune)	Serranidae Variola louti	Reddish brown with bluish spots on the flanks. Yellow-edged tail is like a crescent moon. Dorsal, anal and caudal fins are also fringed with yellow.	Inhabits reefs and artificial wrecks. Found below a certain depth (like most red fish).	Piscivorous (preys on cave-dwelling fish)	80 cm.	Toxic if it exceeds 1.5 kg and fished in Mauritian coastal waters.
Rainbow runner (Carangue saumon)	Carangidae Elagatis bipinnulata	Olive green or blue on upper part, white on lower part. Olive or yellow fins. The term "Rainbow" in the name is quite fitting and aptly describes the changing colours of that fish.	Can be sometimes seen around reefs and artificial wrecks. Fast swimmer, and good sporting fish.	Carnivorous	80–120 cm.	Good commercial fish.
Green jobfish (Vacoas)	Lutjanidae Aprion virescens	Dark green to bluish grey. Dark spots on the middle dorsal fins. Horizontal groove in front of the eye.	Found in the open sea. Often seen on sandy bottom areas. A good fighter when caught with line.	Piscivorous	60–100 cm.	Prized commercial fish.
Ruby snapper (Sacré chien rouge)	Lutjanidae Etelis carbunculus	Pink to red on upper part, but silvery pink on sides and lower part. Inside of mouth is red. Large eyes. Scales are absent on dorsal and anal fins.	Deep-sea carnivorous fish. Caught with line. Good sporting fish.	Piscivorous	50–80 cm.	Prized commercial fish.
Deep-water longtail red snapper (Sacré chien grande queue)	Etelis coruscans	Elongated caudal fin whose upper lobe is longer. Red on the dorsal side, whitish below.	Found on rocky bottoms.	Carnivorous (small fish and crustaceans)	70 cm.	Good commercial fish
Bluestripe snapper (Madras)	Lutjanidae Lutjanus kasmira	Yellow on upper part with four lateral blue stripes; white on ventral side. Yellow fins.	Usually found in shoals around coral reefs. The young fish dwell on sea-grass beds around reefs.	Omnivorous	30 cm.	A third grade eating fish.
Crimson jobfish (Sacré chien blanc)	Lutjanidae Pristipomoides filamentosus	Brown to reddish purple on upper part, colour is less pronounced below. Blue spots on snout. Dorsal and caudal fins are fringed with yellow and orange.	Found in mid waters above rocky bottoms. Swims up at night to feed on small fishes and crustaceans. Caught with line.	Carnivorous	50 cm.	Good commercial fish.
Goldlined seabream (Gueule pavée blanc)	Rhabdosargus sarba	Silvery with lateral yellow lines on the flanks. Its hunched back makes its height almost half as long as its length. Possesses strong teeth for crushing molluscs. Forked caudal fin.	Found in shallow lagoons and estuaries.	Benthivorous	50 cm.	Good eating fish.
Smallspotted dart (Carangue ronde)	Trachinotus bailloni	Silvery blue to grey above, silvery below. Characterized by several black spots along its lateral line. Pronounced V-shaped caudal fin.	Found in the open sea, sandy lagoons and rocky areas. Like other carangues, it can be caught by trailing an empty hook (which the fish mistakes for a small moving sea creature!)	Piscivorous	50 cm.	Commercial fish
Giant trevally (Carangue grande face)	Carangidae Caranx ignobilis	Flattened body, with a somewhat bulging head. Dark yellow to silver above, silvery below. Fins are yellowish to black. Scales are absent on the breast except for a small patch.	Inhabits clear lagoons and seaward reefs. The young fish are often found in estuaries. Caught with line. Good sporting fish. The best fishing months are from September to March.	Carnivorous	170 cm.	Good commercial fish.
Spangled Emperor (Capitaine)	Lethrinidae 'Lethrinus nebulosus'	Pale greyish-green. Scale has a white or bluish spot. Three blue streaks radiate from the eye. Somewhat pointed snout. White or yellowish fins. Dorsal fin is fringed with orange-red.	Found near coral reefs over sandy bottoms. Adults tend to be solitary or swim about in small schools. Lay their eggs twice a year: at the beginning of Summer (October) and in Winter (mid-July).	Carnivorous	80 cm.	Good commercial fish. A very popular fish sold frozen as "Poisson La Perle".
Thumbprint emperor (Batardé)	Lethrinidae 'Lethrinus harak'	Olive-green on upper part, pale grey below. Elliptical black spot, fringed with yellow, behind the pectoral fin.	Found in lagoons, channels, mangroves and above sea-grass beds. Solitary most of the time but occasionally found in small schools.	Carnivorous	50 cm.	Commercial fish.
Yellowfin goatfish (Rouget fayan)	Mullidae 'Mulloidichthys flavolineatus'	Grey to olive above, whitish below. One or two horizontal yellow bands may be visible. Dark spot under the dorsal fin. The most distinctive sign is the two barbs under the lower jaw.	Found on sandy bottoms of lagoons and around reefs. Sometimes swims in large schools.	Benthivorous	40 cm.	Often confused with Yellowfin goatfish (Rouget queue jaune)
Melon butterflyfish (Pavillon rond)	Chaetodon trifasciatus	Yellow to pale orange with lateral purplish blue stripes. A vertical dark band passes through the eye. Small pointed snout.	Inhabits coral areas in lagoons and reefs.	Corallivorous (eats live coral)	15 cm.	Aquarium fish.
Moorish idol (Pavillon cocher)	Zanclus_cornutus	White to pale yellow body with two broad vertical black bands. Very pointed snout. Long and backward slanting dorsal fin. Black caudal fin.	Found in lagoons over coral, and rocky areas (often very close to the shore).	Omnivorous	20 cm.	Popular aquarium fish.
Floral wrasse (Madame tombée)	Labridae 'Cheilinus chlorourus'	Orange to greenish brown. Numerous orange and white dots over the flanks. Black and white dots on the pelvic, anal and caudal fins.	Found in lagoons over coral rubble or sea-grass beds.	Benthivorous	35 cm.	Commercial fish.
Common dolphinfish (Dorade)	Coryphaenidae 'Coryphaena hippurus'	Extended body with a dorsal fin stretching from the head and stopping short of the caudal fin. The dorsal side is blue, speckled with orange dots; ventral part is yellow. However, these colours can change when the fish is under stress. The male has a prominent forehead with a bony 'crown', and is bigger than the female (which is a somewhat uncommon feature in fishes). The fish changes colour rapidly after death.	Inhabits open waters and is often found near floating objects. The best fishing months are from September to January.	Carnivorous	60 cm.	Commercial fish.
Blue-barred parrotfish (Cateau)	Scaridae 'Scarus ghobban'	Body of female is orange-yellow with bluish vertical patterns on the side. Body of male is green on dorsal side; pale-blue stripes are present on the ventral side and there is a pink salmon shade on each scale. The fish is equipped with a parrot-like beaked shaped mouth to scrape algae from corals.	Inhabits shallow lagoons and reefs. Solitary but sometimes swims in small schools. Female lays its eggs on the surface and emits grunts to attract the male; once hatched the little fish go back to the depths.	Herbivorous	70 cm.	Commercial fish.
Shoemaker spinefoot (Cordonnier)	Siganus 'Siganus sutor'	Pale brown to greenish with irregular brown splotches. Colour depends on various factors like location and condition of the fish. These fish even change colours at night. Possesses prickly fins which may cause painful burns.	Inhabits shallow lagoons, but reproduces in deep waters beyond the reefs.	Herbivorous	40 cm.	A third grade eating fish.
Bluespine unicornfish (Corne)	Naso unicornis	Olive green body bulging at the front. Projects a horn on the forehead at the level of the eyes. There are two filaments that extend from the tips of the caudal fin.	Inhabits reefs and lagoons.	Herbivorous	70 cm.	Popular market fish but somewhat smelly.
Palette surgeonfish (Chirurgien bleu)	Paracanthurus hepatus	Oval body. Bright blue with a large black area on the dorsal side. Yellow triangle on caudal fin.	Found near current-swept reefs. The young fish swim in small colonies and hang around branching corals.	Planktivorous	30 cm.	Popular aquarium fish
Yellowfin tuna (Thon jaune)	Thunnus albacares	Spindle-shaped and hydrodynamic body which is dark blue to black above and silvery below. The second dorsal fin and the anal fin are bright yellow. Series of broken vertical lines often visible on the flanks.	Inhabits offshore waters. Found at the surface or in the depths, depending on the time of the day. Swims in schools, often with drifting objects. Can be fished throughout the year but the biggest ones are caught in March, April and May.	Feeds on fish and squids	200 cm.	Highly commercial fish, with a firm flesh.
Skipjack tuna (Bonite)	Katsuwonus pelamis	Dark blue above and silvery below, with four to six lateral dark stripes. There are no scales on the body.	Found in the open sea. Usually swims in schools and often accompanies floating objects and birds. The best fishing months are from September to January.	Piscivorous (also feeds on squids and on its own juveniles!)	100 cm.	Important food fish. Often canned.
Swordfish (Espadon)	Xiphias gladius	Dark brown above and light brown below. The most distinctive feature is unquestionably the sword-like bill. Does not have any jaw teeth and the pelvic fin is absent. The fish has no scales.	Inhabits the open sea but sometimes found in coastal waters. Caught by lines and the best time to catch this sporting fish is from October to April.	Piscivorous (also feeds on squids and crustaceans).	450 cm.	Good commercial fish.
Great barracuda (Tazar lichien)	Sphyraena barracuda	Elongated fish. Silvery with pale dark bands above and dark spots below. Distinctive midway notch on the caudal fin. Powerful teeth. Slightly protruding lower jaw.	Found around reefs and sometimes near mangroves. The best fishing months are from June to October.	Piscivorous	170 cm.	Has been reported to attack humans. Toxic fish.
Whitespotted boxfish (Coffre)	Ostracion meleagris	Bodies of females (and young fish) are dark, covered with white spots. Bodies of the males are yellowish brown, with white spots above and bluish orange spots/bands on the flanks.	Found near coral and rocky reefs.	Omnivorous	25 cm.	Aquarium fish
Spot-fin porcupinefish (Bouletangue)	DiodonHystrix	Pale green to olive brown covered with black spots; shades of white below. Takes the shape of a ball covered with spines when inflated.	Inhabits deep seaward reefs. Inflates itself with air or water to ward off aggressors. Unable to deflate when washed ashore!	Benthivorous	70 cm.	Although consumed by some locals, this fish is considered toxic.
Mascarene Combtooth Blenny (Alticus monochrus)	Alticus monochrus	Dark grey with brown to yellow, angular-shaped vertical striations. High and flexible dorsal fin.	Inhabits intertidal areas with stable rocks and exposure to wave action. Remains out of water if undisturbed. Seeks shelter in cavities at night.	Benthivorous	10 cm.	Amphibious. Endemic species on Mascarene Islands.

=== See also ===
- Mascarene Islands
- St Brandon
- Marine Protected Area
- Cargados Carajos
- Mauritius
- Île Raphael
- Avocaré Island
- Permanent Grant
- L'île du Sud
- L'île du Gouvernement
- L'Île Coco
