= Raphael Fishing Company =

Mauritian fishing company

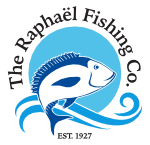
- The Raphaël Fishing Company
- Company type: Public, multiple shareholders
- Industry: Sustainable Line Fishing
- Founded: 7 July 1927; 98 years ago in Port Louis, Mauritius
- Headquarters: Port Louis, Mauritius, Port Louis Praslin Street, Port Louis & Île Raphael, Mauritius.
- Number of locations: 13 islands
- Area served: Cargados Carajos Archipelago & Mauritius
- Products: Fishing and Fisheries
- Number of employees: 40 -60

The Raphaël Fishing Company Ltd is a Mauritian fishing company incorporated as Company C404 on 7th July 1927 in Port Louis, Mauritius. Company C404 is the oldest continuously registered commercial company in Mauritius on record.

The company is a fisheries company which is notable under common law for having set legal precedent in the conversion of its 124-year old unlimited jouissance (permanent lease/999-year lease) into a permanent grant by the UK Privy Council in 2008 giving it title to thirteen islands known as The Thirteen Islands of St Brandon in the Indian Ocean on the isolated archipelago of the Cargados Carajos shoals.

== Fishing operations ==
Raphael Fishing Company has resident fishermen and fishing stations on the Cargados Carajos shoals. The company provides support, victuals and infrastructure to sustain fishing and associated activities from fishing stations in St Brandon and through offices in Port Louis.

Fishing operations are artisanal, being carried out by about forty fishermen in teams of two using hand lines in fibre glass pirogues. Nets are illegal in St Brandon.

The company's primary ships in 2022 were MV Albatross and MV Fregate which were specially designed and commissioned in 2017 to transport fish, supplies and personnel between fishing stations in St. Brandon and Port Louis (a distance of approximately 469 km), where the fish is sold immediately upon arrival.

== History and permanent grant ==
The company is named for a Captain Raphaël, who owned the lease to Île Raphaël and had installations on the corner of rue des Pamplemousses and rue Fanfaron in Port Louis. Captain Raphaël travelled regularly to Île Raphael, St Brandon from Port Louis and, on 17 May 1816 and November 1817, is on record as bringing back salted fish on a Lugger called 'Le Cheriby'.

In 1928, the Raphael Fishing Company Ltd., purchased the rights and interests of St Brandon Fish & Manure Co. Ltd., under the 11 October 1901 deed, after it had gone into liquidation, from Mr. Ulcoq who had bought them from the liquidator in 1925. The sale to M. Ulcoq and the subsequent sale to Raphael Fishing Co. Ltd., were duly approved by the state.

On 11 August 1995, court proceedings were started by The Raphael Fishing Company Ltd., against a Mr Talbot who purported to own six islands and the Iles Boisées. The proceedings were against M. Talbot with the State of Mauritius as a co-defendant.

On 30 May 2005, the legal proceedings by Raphael Fishing Company Ltd., appeared to have come to an unsuccessful end in Mauritian Courts which refused the Raphael Fishing Co. Ltd., leave to appeal to the UK Privy Council.

On 27 July 2006, the UK Privy Council (which has the power to do this under the Mauritian Constitution) intervened to grant the Raphael Fishing Company Ltd., leave to appeal.

On 30 July 2008, in keeping with the Constitution of Mauritius, the Judicial Committee of the Privy Council rendered its verdict as follows: "For the reasons given in the above judgment the Board will allow this appeal, set aside the orders made in the courts below and declare that [the Raphael Fishing Co. Ltd.,] is the holder of a Permanent Grant of the islands mentioned in the 1901 Deed (...) subject to the conditions therein referred to". This effectively transferred ownership of the thirteen islands to the company.

These conditions were:

- The Company must export all the guano it finds and pay the Government a royalty of 5 rupees per ton of Guano exported.
- The company, in addition, must pay the Government an annual sum of one rupee,
- All the produce of the islands must be sent to Mauritius.

== See also ==
- Île Raphael
- L'île du Sud
- Avocaré Island
- L'île du Gouvernement
- L'Île Coco
- Île Verronge
- Constitution of Mauritius
- Permanent Grant
- Emphyteutic lease
