= Île Verronge =

Coordinates: 16°40′43″S 59°36′24″E

St. Brandon recommended as Marine Protected Area (MPA) by World Bank (1998), accepted by Ministry in 'Blueprint' (2002), approved by the government of Mauritius (2004)

Île Verronge is one of circa thirty isles, island and sandbars that is part of the St. Brandon archipelago in the Indian Ocean. It is constitutionally designated, under Mauritian law, as one of the outer islands of Mauritius.

In the 1840s, the primary fishing station of St. Brandon was established on Île Verronge which today is an uninhabited bird and turtle sanctuary. Access to the public is restricted, and permission is required to onboard the island from the local fishing company with established fishing stations on the islands.

Île Verronge was one of the islands chosen by the World Bank to be part of the marine protected area of St Brandon.

== Some of the Corals around Île Verronge ==
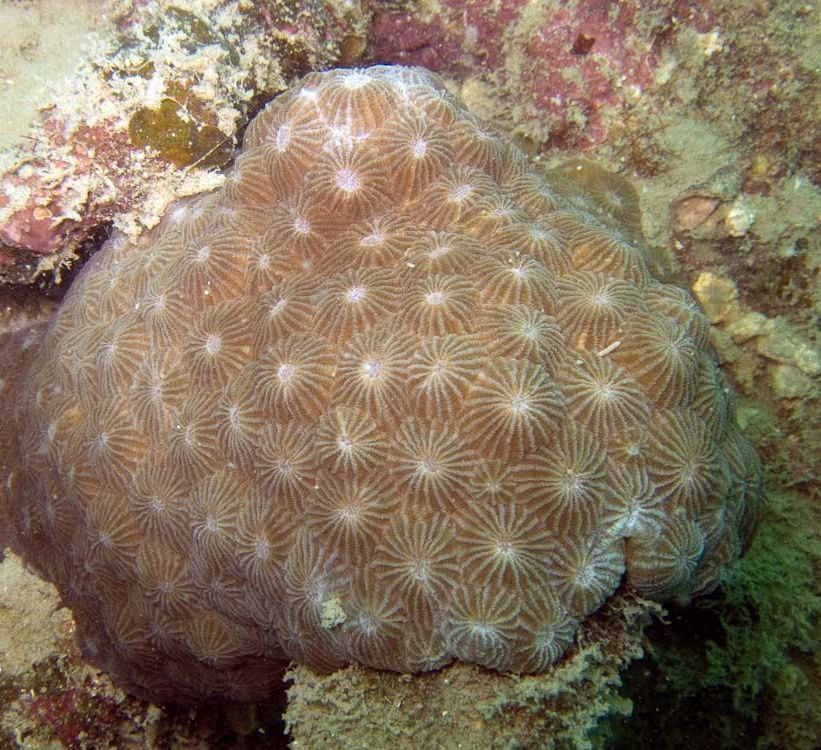
types of Corals in St. Brandon - Diploastrea heliopora

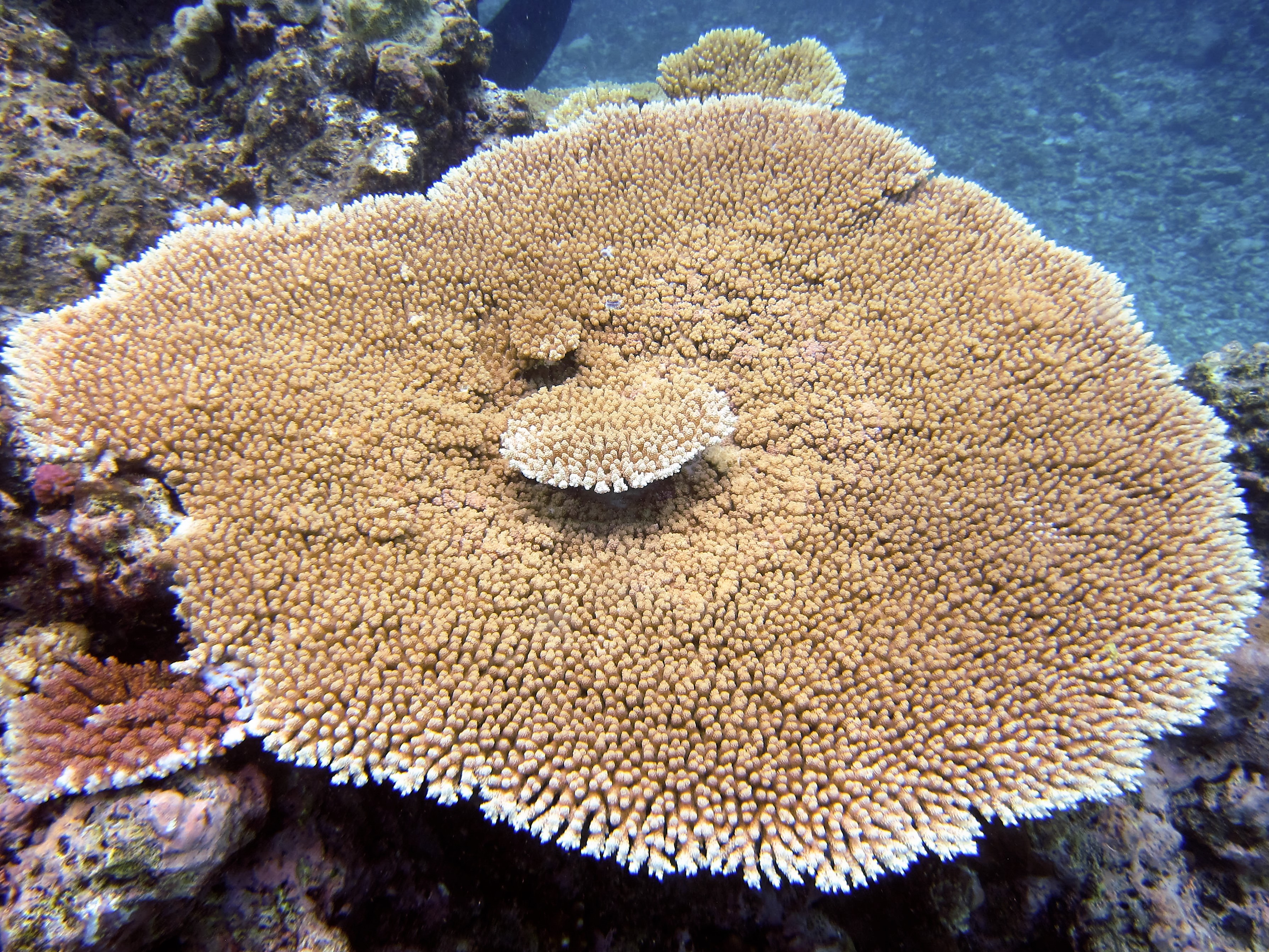
types of Corals in St. Brandon - Acropora_hyacinthus

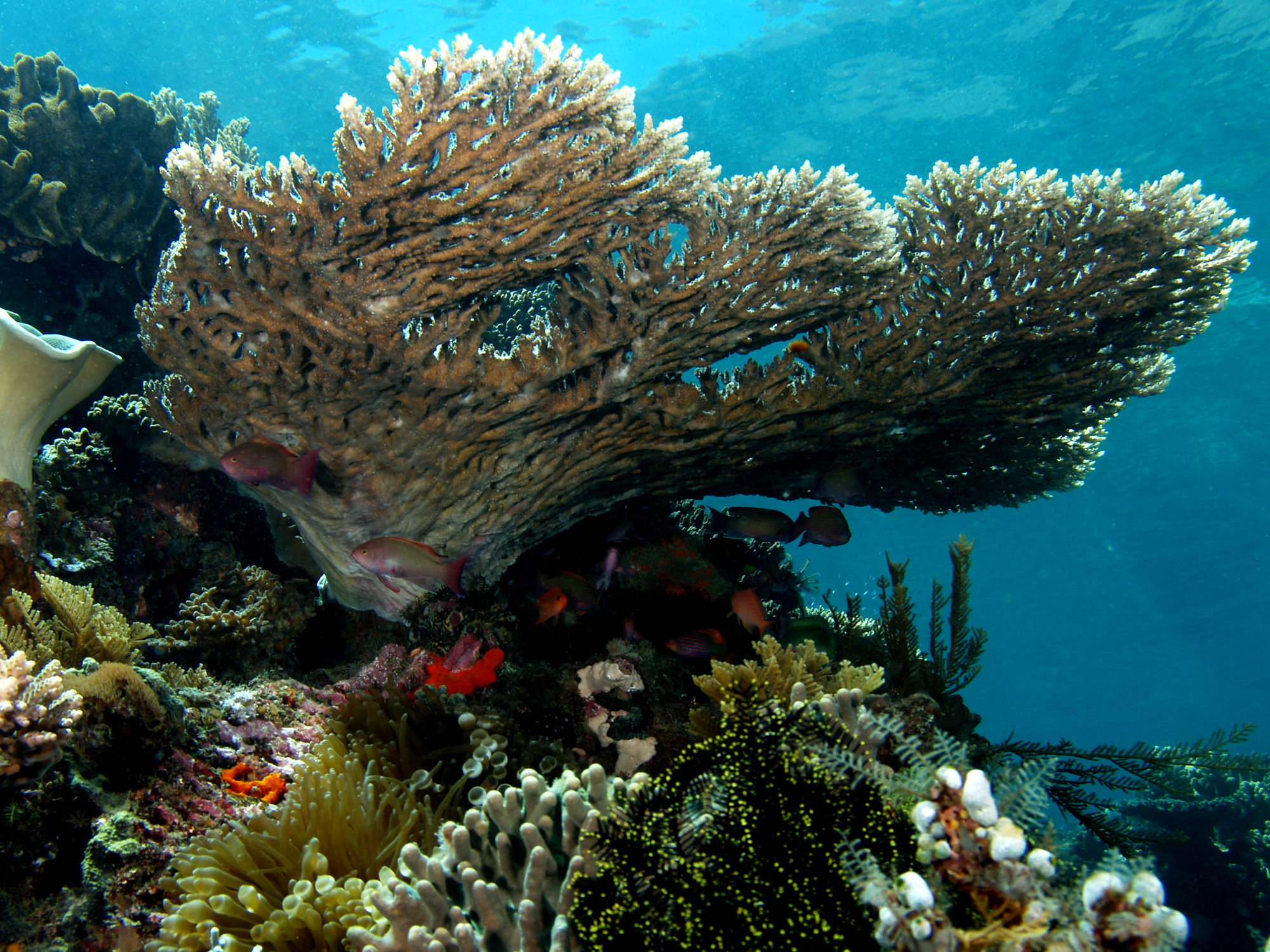
types of Corals in St. Brandon - Acropora latistella

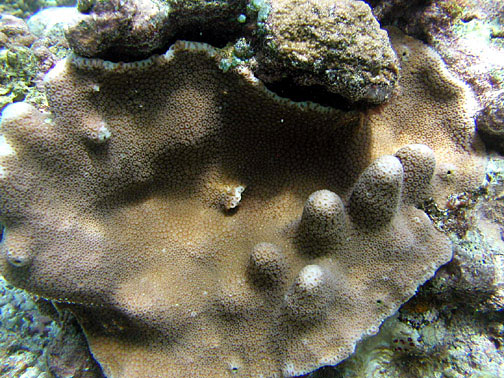
types of Corals in St. Brandon - Favia_stelligera

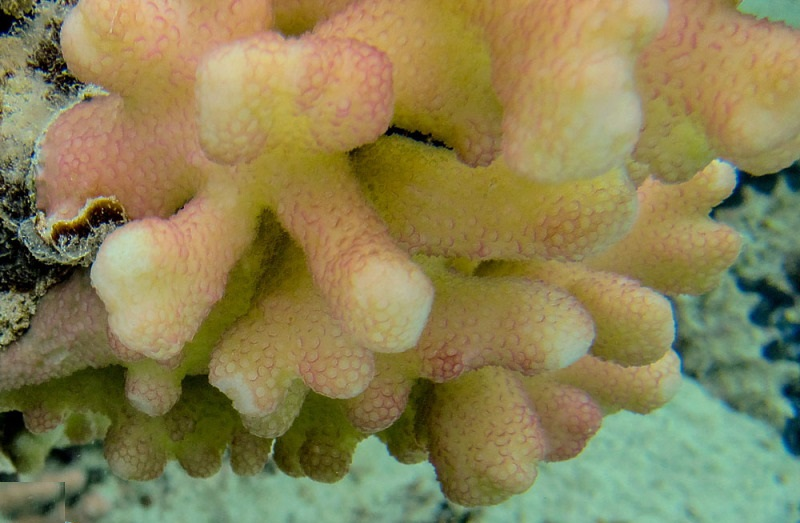
types of Corals in St. Brandon - Stylophora_pistillata

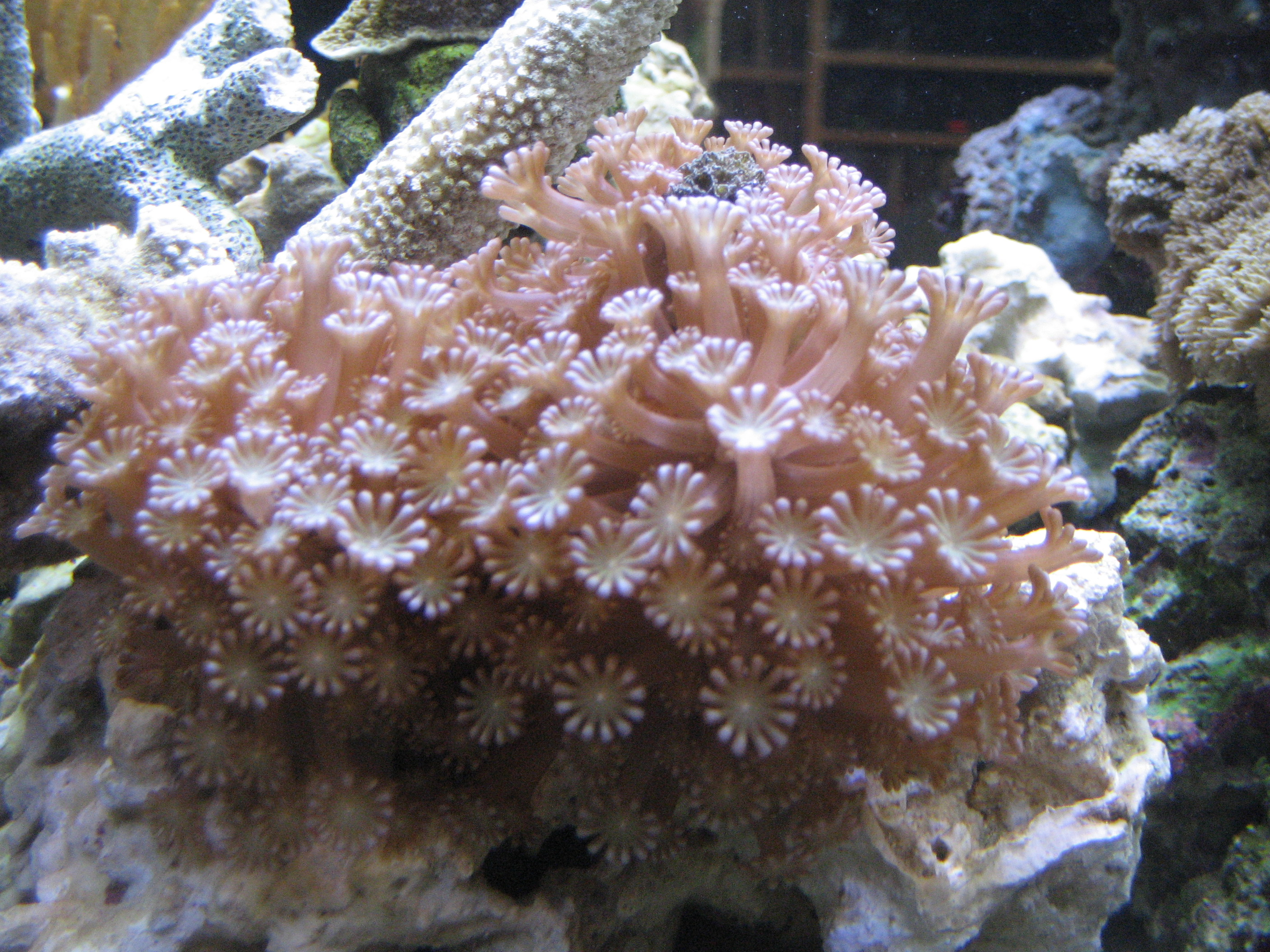
types of Corals in St. Brandon - Alveopora

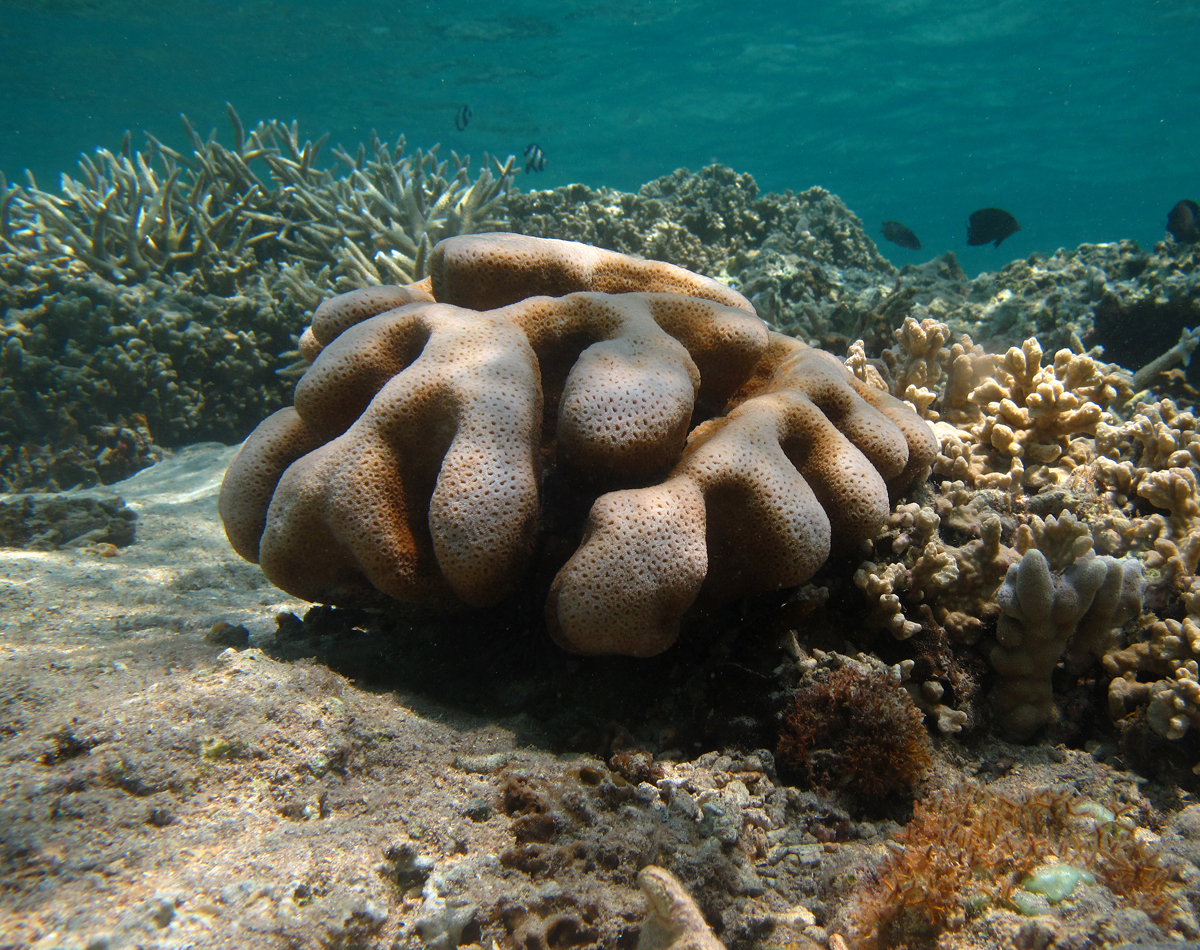
types of Corals in St. Brandon - Cyphastrea_serailia

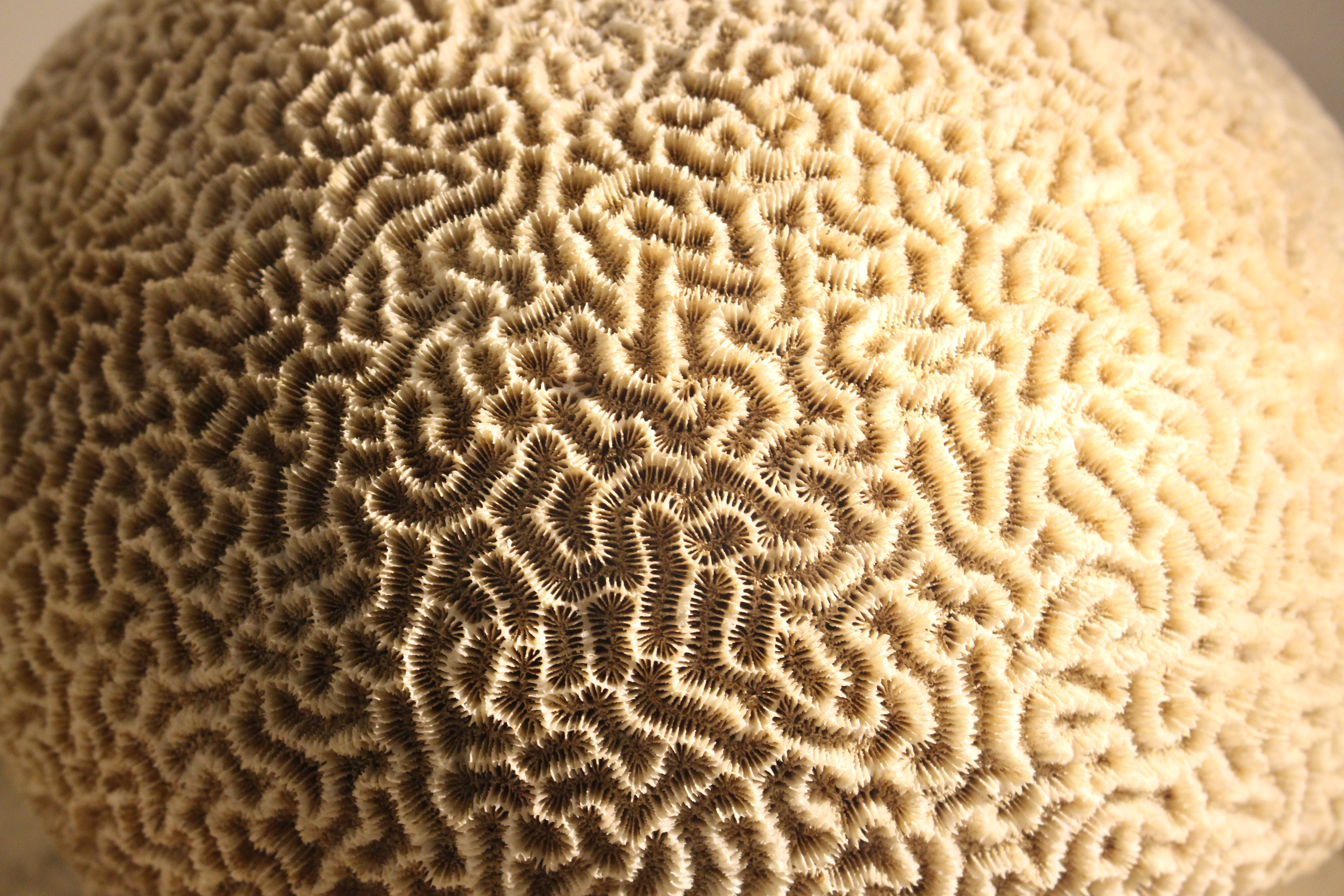
types of Corals in St. Brandon - Platygyra

== See also ==
- St Brandon
- Mascarene Islands
- Île Raphael
- Avocaré Island
- L'île du Sud
- L'île du Gouvernement
- Raphaël Fishing Company
- L'Île Coco
- Constitution of Mauritius
- permanent grant
- Mauritian Wildlife Foundation
