= Albatross Island =

Albatross Island may refer to:

- Albatross Island (South Georgia)
- Albatross Island (Tasmania)
- Albatross Island (St. Brandon), in the St. Brandon archipelago, in the outer islands of Mauritius
- Albatross Island, an islet just south of Thistle Island in South Australia
- Albatross Island, one of the Penguin Islands off the Namibian coast
- Île Albatross, near Savanne, southern Mauritius
- The former name of West Point Island, Falkland Islands
