= Permanent grant =

Permanent lease by the United Kingdom Privy Council

A 999-year lease, under historic common law, is a permanent lease of property.

Permanent lease locations are in Britain, its former colonies and the Commonwealth.

A former colony, the Republic of Mauritius established a legal precedent through a decision of the Judicial Committee of the Privy Council (The Raphael Fishing Company Ltd v. The State of Mauritius & Anor (Mauritius) [2008] UKPC 43 (30 July 2008)) on 30 July 2008 in respect of a 1901 'permanent lease' on the following islands of St. Brandon (Cargados Carajos) :

Royal Arms UK (Privy Council)

Name	AKA
1.Île Raphael	Raphaël Island
2. L'île du Sud (South Island, l'île Boisées)	South Island, l'île Boisée
3. Petit Fou Island	-
4. Avocaré Island	Avocaré Avoquer, L'Avocaire
5. l'île aux Fous	Fous, Ile Fou
6. L'île du Gouvernement	Government Island
7. Petit Mapou Island	Small Mapou
8. Grand Mapou Island	Big Mapou
9. La Baleine Island	Whale Island
10. L'Île Coco	Coco Island, Île Cocos, Île aux Cocos
11. Île Verronge	Verronge Island
12. l'île aux Bois	Wooded Island
13. La Baleine Rocks Island	Whale Rocks Island

These islands were converted from a 1901 999-year lease to a permanent grant by the Privy Council in 2008. The Privy Council judgment (Article 71) confirmed Raphaël Fishing Company legally as "the holder of a Permanent Grant of the thirteen islands mentioned in the 1901 Deed (transcribed in Vol TB25 No 342) subject to the conditions therein referred to."

== See also ==
- Judicial Committee of the Privy Council
- Raphaël Fishing Company
- Mascarene Islands
- Avocaré Island
- L'île du Sud
- L'île du Gouvernement
- L'Île Coco
- 99-year lease
- 999-year leases in Hong Kong
- Constitution of Mauritius
- St. Brandon
