= Albatross Island, St. Brandon =

Island in Mauritius

Coordinates: 16°15′0″S 59°36′0″E

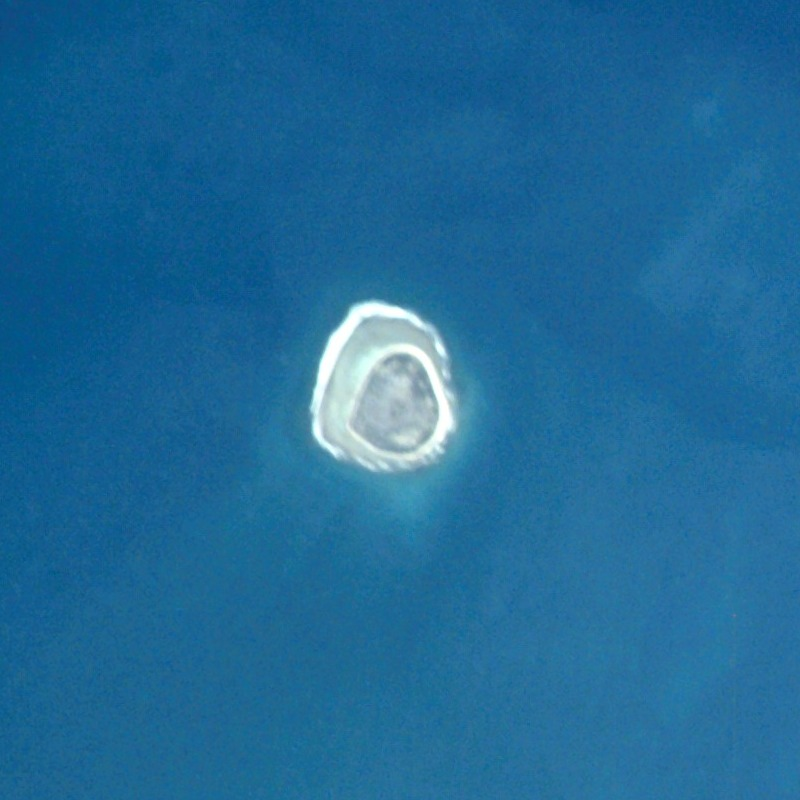
Satellite or space station view of Albatross Island in the St. Brandon archipelago

Albatross Island is an island in the St. Brandon archipelago, a group of outer islands of Mauritius. A small fishing station existed on the island until 1988.

On 5 June 2021, the FV Sea Master belonging to the Mauritian company Hassen Taher was shipwrecked on Albatross Island. All crew members were rescued by fishermen working for the resident fishing company Raphael Fishing Company living on Île Raphael nearby.
