= L'île du Sud =

Island in Cargados Carajos coral reef atoll system

Coordinates: 16°48′56″S 59°30′09″E

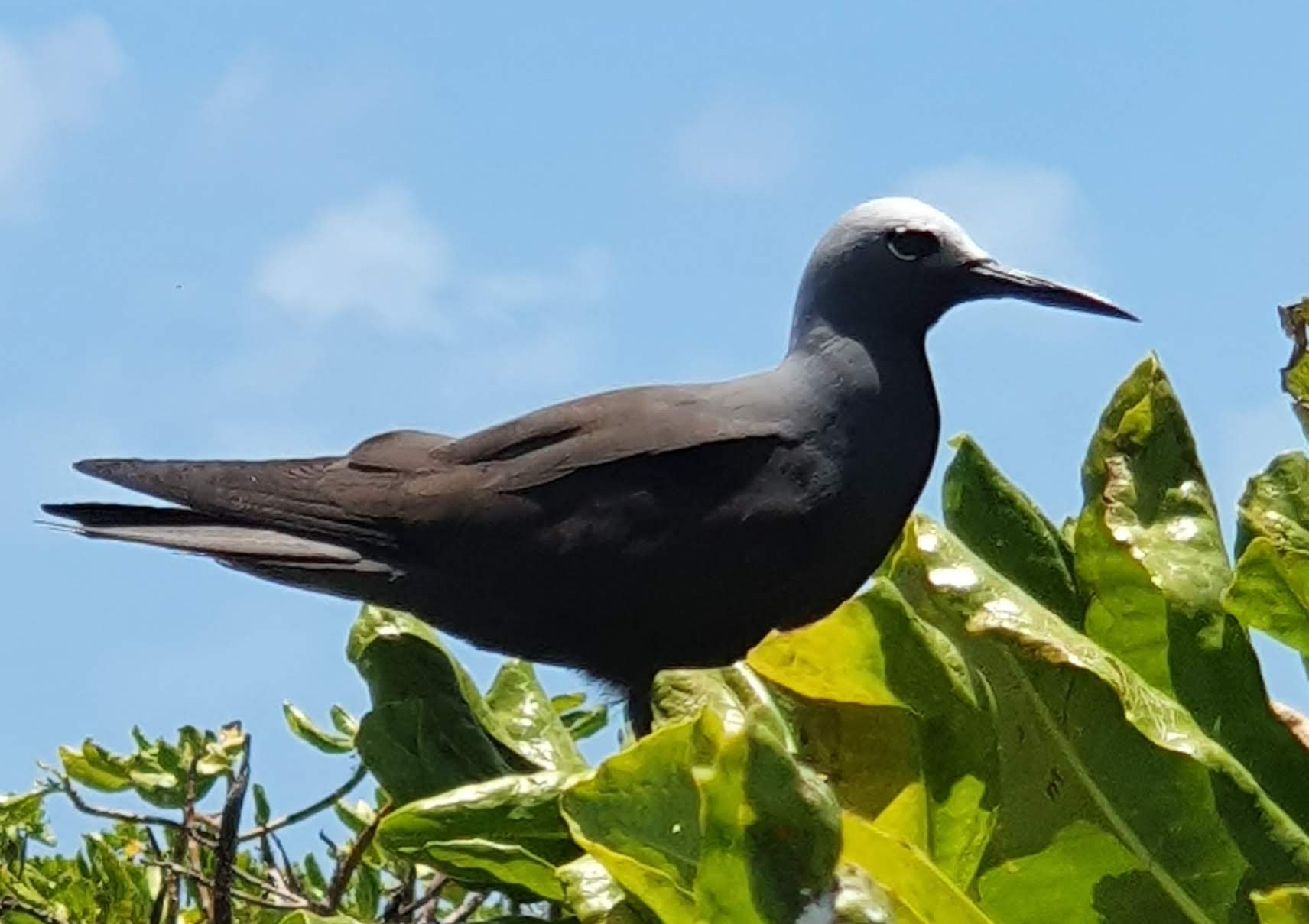
A seabird found in Ile du Sud, St. Brandon

L'île du Sud (South Island, l'île Boisées) is an island located in the St. Brandon archipelago. It is one of the three islands (the others being Île Raphael and L'Île Coco) used as a base of operations for fishing activities by Raphael Fishing Company, the only resident fishing company in the Cargados Carajos shoals under a 1901 contract with the government of Mauritius.

== Shipwrecks ==
On 1 February 2015, the fishing vessel, Kha Yang, with 250,000 L (55,000 imp gal; 66,000 US gal) of fuel in its tanks, ran aground on the reef off L'île du Sud. Twenty crew were rescued shortly after its grounding, and a salvage operation pumped the fuel from its tanks a few weeks later.

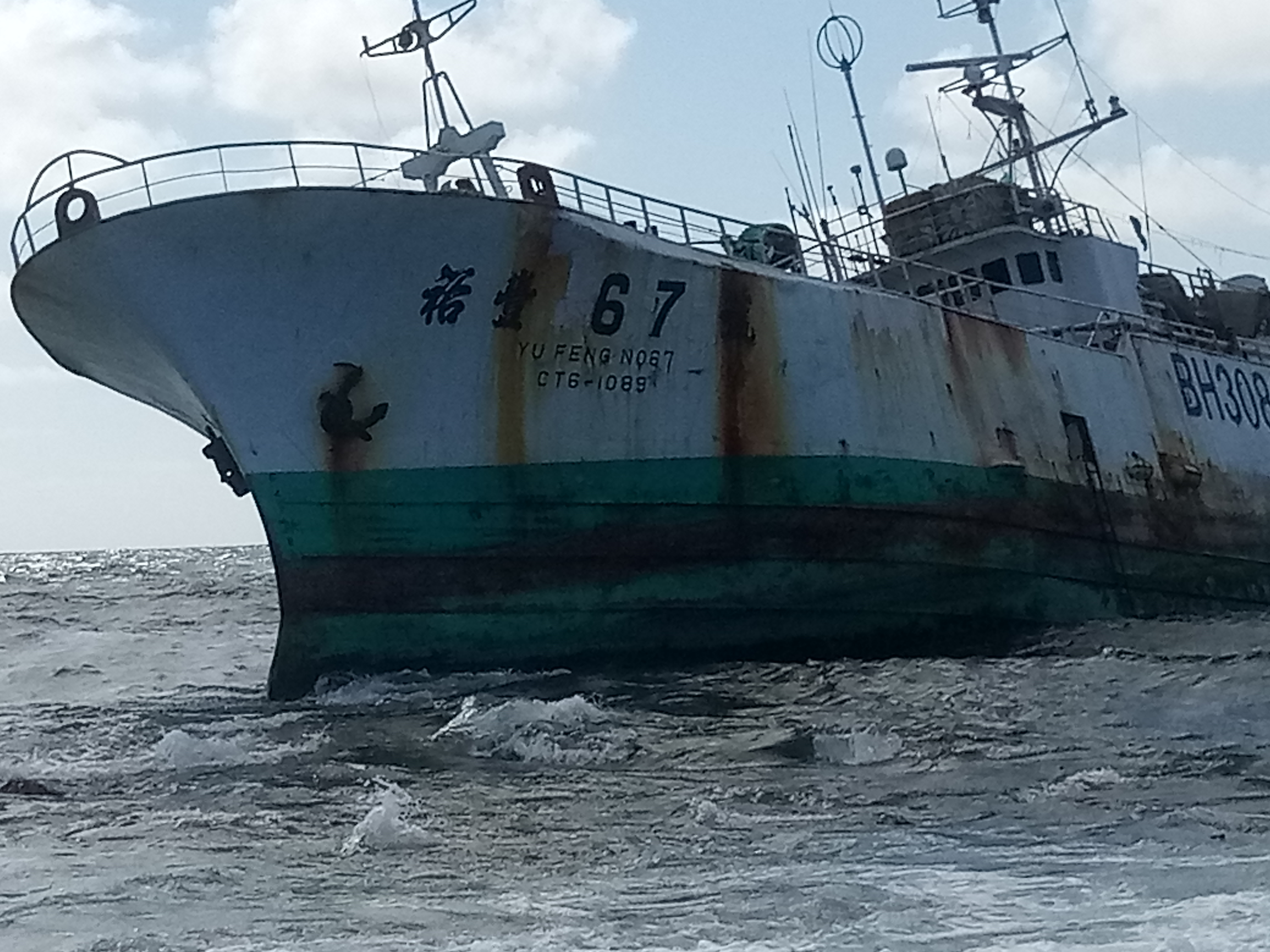
A 2022 Taiwanese Fleet shipwreck off the coast of l'ile du Sud.

On 5 December 2022, the Taiwanese fishing vessel, 41 FV YU FENG 67, ran aground off L'île du Sud. Its crew of 20 were later rescued by the local commercial fishing boats of Raphael Fishing Company, in the presence of the National Coast Guard. The vessel is now an effective shipwreck, and more than 20 tons of diesel were spilled into the fragile lagoon, affecting coral life and associated flora and fauna.

== See also ==
- St. Brandon
- Île Raphael
- Raphaël Fishing Company
- Avocaré Island
- L'île du Gouvernement
- Île Verronge
- Casting (fishing)
- Fishing tournament
- Fly Casting Analyzer
- Constitution of Mauritius
- permanent grant
- Mauritian Wildlife Foundation
