= St. Brandon =

Mauritian atoll in the Indian Ocean

Saint Brandon
Native name: Cargados Carajos
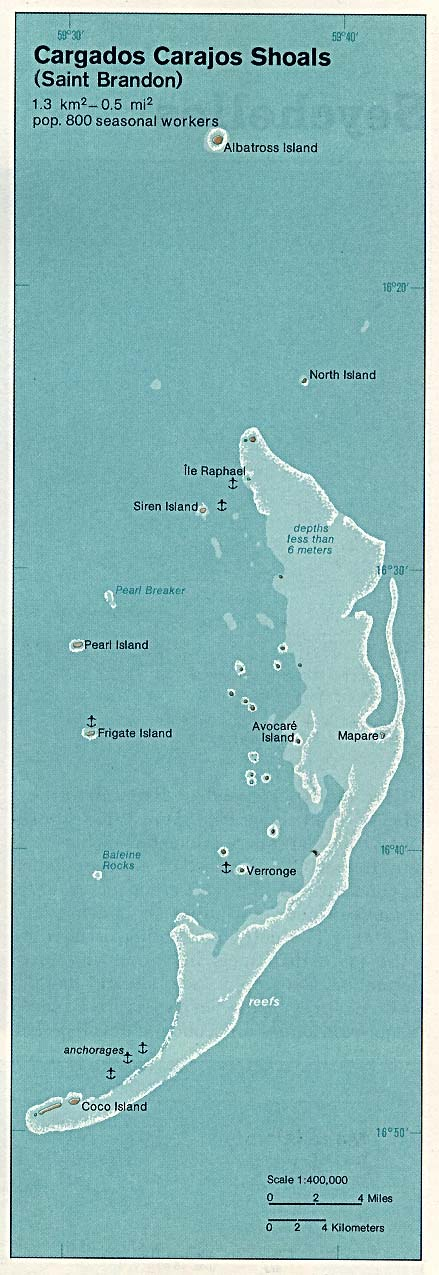

- Saint Brandon highlighted with a red circle in Mauritius

Geography
- Location: Indian Ocean
- Coordinates: 16°35′S 59°37′E
- Archipelago: Cargados Carajos
- Total islands: 22
- Major islands: Albatross Island, Raphaël, Avocaré Island, L'Île Coco and L'île du Sud
- Area: 1.3 km^{2} (0.50 sq mi)

Administration
- Mauritius
- Largest settlement: Île Raphaël (pop. 30)

Demographics
- Population: 40 (2022)
- Pop. density: 48/km^{2} (124/sq mi)

Saint Brandon (French: Saint-Brandon), also known as the Cargados Carajos Shoals, is a southwest Indian Ocean archipelago of sand banks, shoals and islets belonging to the Republic of Mauritius. It lies about 430 km (270 mi) northeast of the island of Mauritius. It consists of five island groups, with about 28-40 islands and islets in total, depending on seasonal storms and related sand movements.

The archipelago is low-lying and is prone to substantial submersion in severe weather, but also by annual tropical cyclones in the Mascarene Islands. It has an aggregate land area estimated variously at 1.3 km^{2} (0.50 sq mi) and 200 ha (500 acres). The islands have a small resident population of around 60 fishermen working for the Raphael Fishing Company. The bulk of this population, approximately 40 people, reside on Île Raphael, with smaller settlements existing on Avocaré Island, L'Île Coco, and L'île du Sud.

In the early 19th century, most of the islands were used as fishing stations. Today, only one resident fishing company operates on the archipelago with three fishing stations and accommodation for fly fishermen on L'île du Sud, Île Raphael and L'Île Coco. The isolated Albatross Island reverted to the State of Mauritius in May 1992 and has since been abandoned. Thirteen of the thirty islands were subject to a legal challenge from 1995 until 2008 between a certain Mr. Talbot (acting with the government) and the Raphael Fishing Company, this being resolved by Mauritius's highest Court of Appeal in 2008 which converted the erstwhile permanent lease into a permanent grant for the resident fishing company.

As is common amongst small, remote islands, the fauna and flora display a high degree of endemism which attracts visitors and international conservationists because of the critical role these remote islands play in the conservation of endangered species. The endangered green sea turtle (Chelonia mydas) nests here as does the critically endangered Hawksbill turtle (Eretmochelys imbricata) which may be unique to the extent that they are eventually confirmed as being genetically different from those further north in the Chagos Islands and the Seychelles.

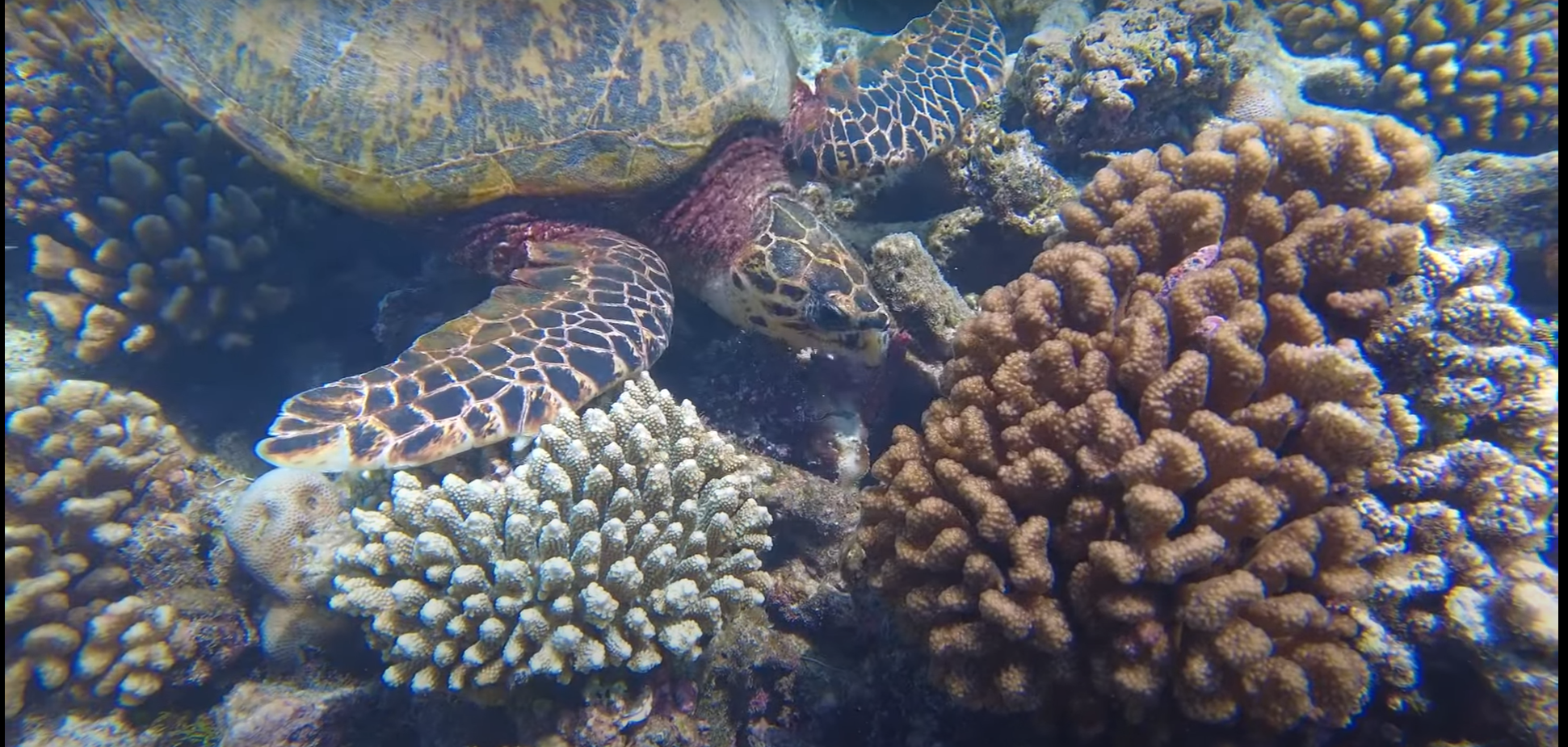
Critically endangered Hawksbill turtle (Eretmochelys imbricata) on L'Île Coco in Saint Brandon

The islands, designated a Key Biodiversity Area under CEPF, are also instrumental in the preservation of many bird species that are either vulnerable or near-threatened and were recommended as a Marine Protected Area (MPA) by the World Bank (1998). The World Bank's management plan was accepted, with a few changes, at Mauritian ministry level in its "Blue Print for the Management of St. Brandon" in 2002 and thereafter approved by the government of Mauritius in 2004.

== Etymology ==
In the early 1500s, the Portuguese labelled the islands Cargados Carajos on charts such as the Cantino Planisphere of 1502, which identified them as baixos ("low-lying"), with a surround of crosses to identify the danger to shipping.

Various explanations have been given for the islands having subsequently been named Saint Brandon. One of these is that it is an anglicized name of the French town of Saint-Brandan, possibly given by French sailors and corsairs that sailed to and from Brittany.

Another explanation is that the name derived from the mythical Saint Brendan's Island that goes back to Saint Brendan of Clonfert, Brendan the Navigator, because French sailors associated the atoll with the patron saint of sailors.

The name Cargados Carajos, which refers to the "loaded crow's nest" of a Portuguese caravel that was required to successfully sail through the dangerous atoll, remains in use as well.

== Climate ==
Climate data for Saint Brandon (1991–2020)
Month	Jan	Feb	Mar	Apr	May	Jun	Jul	Aug	Sep	Oct	Nov	Dec	Year
Record high °C (°F)	35.6 (96.1)	35.1 (95.2)	35.4 (95.7)	34.0 (93.2)	33.0 (91.4)	31.0 (87.8)	30.1 (86.2)	29.8 (85.6)	30.5 (86.9)	31.7 (89.1)	33.8 (92.8)	34.3 (93.7)	35.6 (96.1)
Mean daily maximum °C (°F)	31.4 (88.5)	31.4 (88.5)	31.4 (88.5)	30.5 (86.9)	29.0 (84.2)	27.2 (81.0)	26.2 (79.2)	26.3 (79.3)	26.9 (80.4)	27.9 (82.2)	29.4 (84.9)	30.9 (87.6)	29.0 (84.2)
Daily mean °C (°F)	28.4 (83.1)	28.5 (83.3)	28.5 (83.3)	27.9 (82.2)	26.6 (79.9)	25.0 (77.0)	24.1 (75.4)	23.9 (75.0)	24.2 (75.6)	25.1 (77.2)	26.4 (79.5)	27.7 (81.9)	26.4 (79.5)
Mean daily minimum °C (°F)	26.0 (78.8)	26.2 (79.2)	26.2 (79.2)	25.7 (78.3)	24.7 (76.5)	23.2 (73.8)	22.2 (72.0)	21.9 (71.4)	22.3 (72.1)	23.2 (73.8)	24.2 (75.6)	25.3 (77.5)	24.3 (75.7)
Record low °C (°F)	22.5 (72.5)	21.4 (70.5)	21.0 (69.8)	21.8 (71.2)	20.0 (68.0)	19.2 (66.6)	18.0 (64.4)	17.6 (63.7)	18.9 (66.0)	19.2 (66.6)	20.6 (69.1)	21.4 (70.5)	17.6 (63.7)
Average precipitation mm (inches)	141.5 (5.57)	184.7 (7.27)	140.0 (5.51)	125.5 (4.94)	71.2 (2.80)	46.1 (1.81)	47.5 (1.87)	46.6 (1.83)	29.3 (1.15)	27.2 (1.07)	36.9 (1.45)	77.6 (3.06)	974.1 (38.35)
Average precipitation days (≥ 1.0 mm)	11.3	12.2	12.4	11.4	9.2	10.0	10.9	10.8	7.1	5.9	5.2	8.1	114.6
Source: NOAA

== Geography ==
Location of Saint Brandon in the Indian Ocean

Geographically, the archipelago is part of the Mascarene Islands and is situated on the Mascarene Plateau formed by the separation of the Mauritia microcontinent during the separation of India and Madagascar around 60 million years ago from what is today the African continent.

The reef measures more than 50 km (31 mi) from north to south and is 5 km (3.1 mi) wide, cut by three passes. The reef area is 190 km^{2} (73 sq mi). The total number of islands on the reef varies but usually number around 40. Siren Island, L'île du Sud, Pearl Island, and Frigate Island are west of the reef, while North Island is about 4 km (2.5 mi) northeast of the northern tip of the reef. Albatross Island, about 18 km (11 mi) north, is geographically a separate single coral island.

Albatross Island is the highest point at 6 m (20 ft) above sea level and the largest of the islands in the group, with an area of 1.01 km^{2} (0.39 sq mi), followed by Raphaël, Tortue, Avocaré Island, L'Île Coco and L'île du Sud.

Temperatures range from 23–26 °C (73–79 °F), with rainfall of 1,050 mm (41 in) a year, most falling in January to April. The climate is dominated by the south-east trades. Cyclones can cause considerable damage. In 1948, Il aux Fous disappeared and Avoquer was submerged by two meters of water. Petit ile Longue was swept away in a later cyclone, but is now reappearing. The South Equatorial Current is dominant.

=== List of named islands ===
St. Brandon

Name(s)		Area	Coordinates
Albatross Island		1.01 km^{2} (0.39 sq mi)	16°14′27″S 59°35′31″E
Îlot du Nord (Île du Nord)	North Island		16°23′16″S 59°38′32″E
Île Raphael	(Raphaël Island)		16°26′00″S 59°36′18″E
Îlot Siren			16°28′05″S 59°34′49″E
Île Tortue		0.13 km^{2} (0.050 sq mi)	16°29′00″S 59°41′014″E
Pearl Islet	(Île Perle)		16°32′46″S 59°30′20″E
L'île du Sud l'île Boisées	(South Island)		16°48′55″S 59°30′09″E
Avocaré Island	(Avoquer, L'Avocaire)	0.02 km^{2} (0.0077 sq mi)	16°36′10″S 59°38′26″E
L'île du Gouvernement	(Government Island)		16°23′39″S 59°38′59″E
Petit Capitaine			16°36′0.0″S 59°34′0.0″E
Grande Capitaine			16°40′0.0″S 59°50′0.0″E
Mapare Islet		0.4 km^{2} (0.15 sq mi)	16°34′22″S 59°42′08″E
Frigate Islet	(Île Frégate)		16°35′55″S 59°30′49″E
Îlote du Paul (Île Paul)			16°37′0.0″S 59°33′0.0″E
Puits A Eau			16°39′0.0″S 59°34′0.0″E
Baleine Rocks	(La Baleine)		16°40′0.0″S 59°31′0.0″E
Île Verronge	(Verronge)		16°40′43″S 59°36′23″E
Veronge Ilot			16°42′0.0″S 59°38′0.0″E
Île Poulailler			16°44′0.0″S 59°46′0.0″E
Palm Islet			16°45′0.0″S 59°35′0.0″E
Chaloupe			16°45′08″S 59°34′21″E
Courson			16°48′0.0″S 59°30′0.0″E
L'Île Coco (Île Cocos, Île aux Cocos)		0.5 km^{2} (0.19 sq mi)	16°48′56″S 59°30′09″E

== Ecology ==
=== Reefs ===
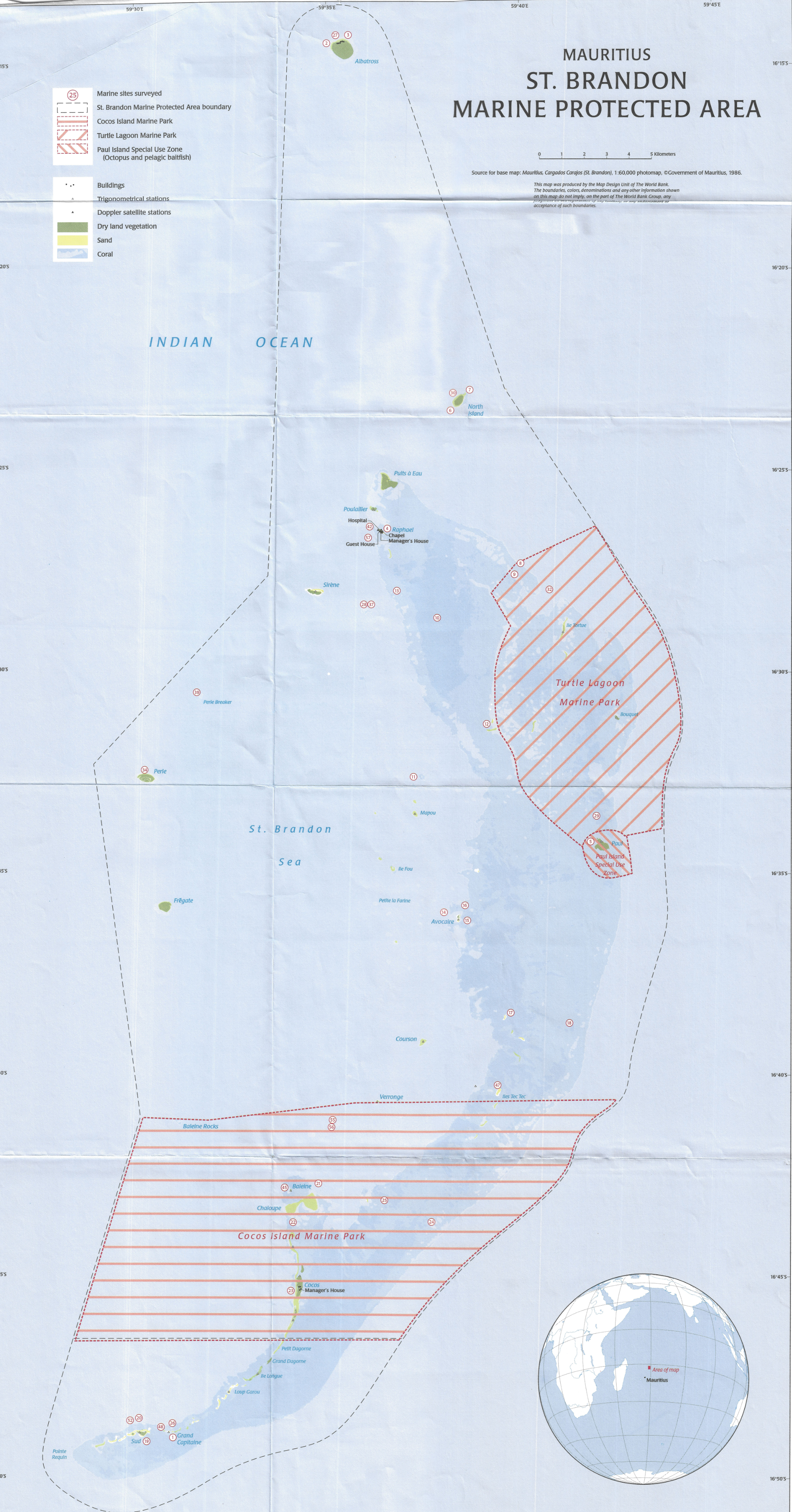
Map delineating The Saint Brandon Marine Protected Area.

St. Brandon comprises about 190 km^{2} (73 sq mi) of reefs. It has one of the longest algal ridges in the Indian Ocean. Coconut trees can be found on a few islands as well as a variety of bushes and grass. The islands are covered with white granular sand from eroded coral, and a thick layer of guano can be found on some islands.

The western part of the bay has a coral bank and a fringing reef, dominated by staghorn Acropora, with an irregular front which merges with the coral banks; the reef flat has appreciable coral cover. North of this, or deeper into the bay, are several isolated patches of coral growing in deeper water.

The eastern border has reefs with a greater diversity of corals, in particular, enormous hillocks of Pavona spp. with Mycedium tenuicostatum which is unusual in Mauritius. On the sandy substrate, Goniopora and Pontes provide hard substrate for several other species, notably Acropora and Pavona. Large tabular 'Acropora corals are also conspicuous, and when dead or overturned, provide substrate for other colonizers. These patches have expanded and fused to provide the numerous, large coral banks found in the Bay. Only twenty-eight coral species have been recorded which is probably due to the uniform habitat. Further offshore lies a peripheral fringing reef.

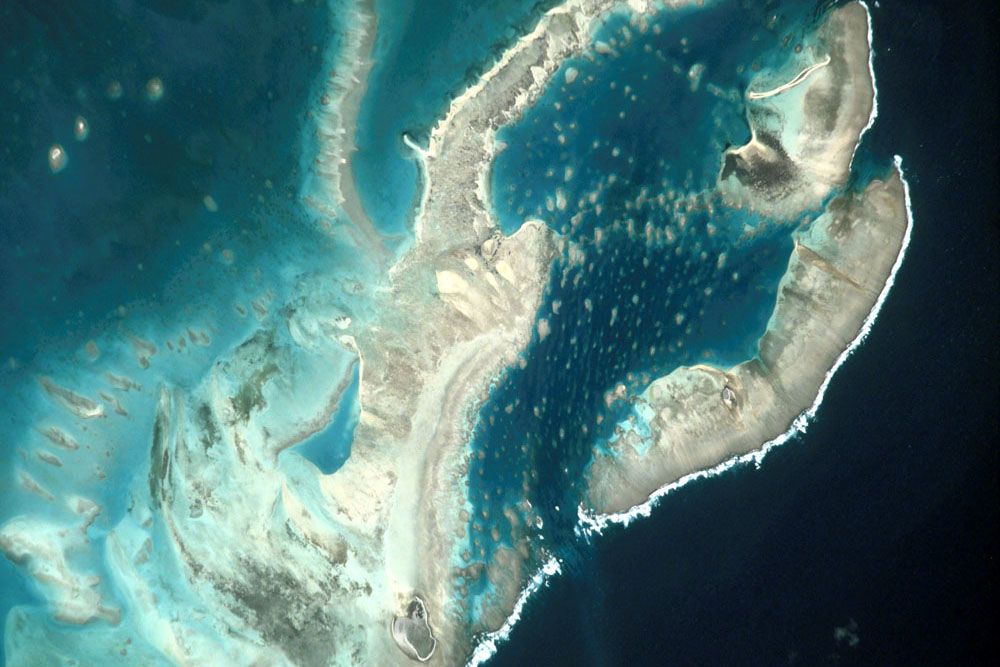
Satellite image of St. Brandon

This complex of low islands, coral reefs and sand banks arises from a vast shallow submarine platform. The main structure is a large, 100 km (62 mi) long crescent-shaped reef whose convex side faces towards the south-east trades and the South Equatorial Current. The reef front of the main reef recurves inwards at both ends and is cut by two or three passes.

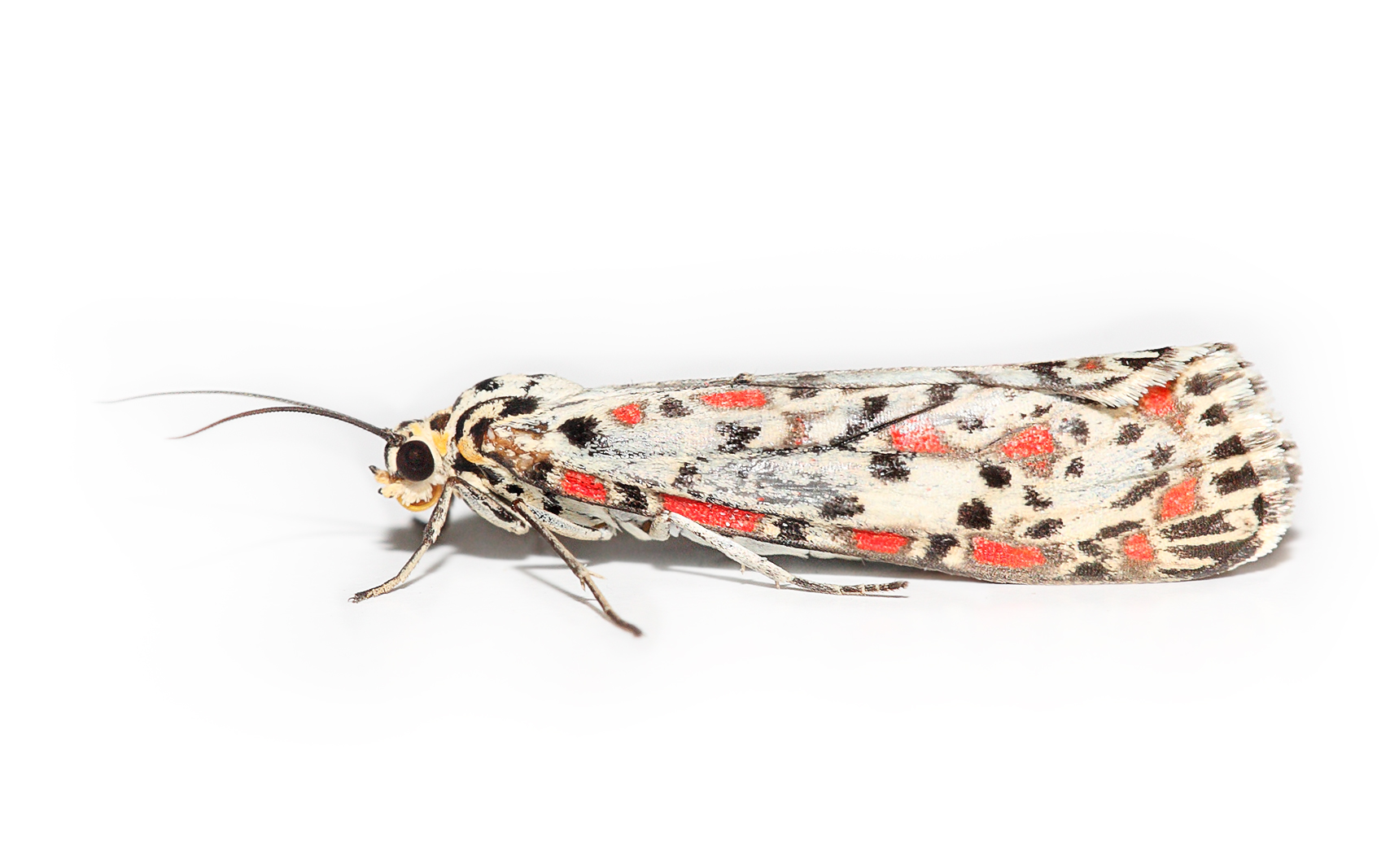
Utetheisa pulchelloides, the heliotrope moth, is a moth of the family Erebidae found in Saint Brandon.

The main reef has a very broad reef flat, extending up to several hundred metres across in parts. Together with much of the broad reef flat it is emergent at low tides. Apart from calcareous red algae it supports a few pocilloporoid corals. Down to at least 20 m (66 ft) depth the substrate is swept clear of attached biota, although on the sides of spurs or buttresses a few corals exist. Underwater photographs of some of the numerous knolls and banks behind the reef show that the density of corals and soft corals is typical of many very sedimented areas and shallow lagoons in the Indian Ocean.

The islands are home to at least 26 species of seabirds such as Red-footed booby, sooty terns, and white terns. Endangered Green turtles and Critically Endangered hawksbill turtles nest on the islands.

Given the total isolation of the atoll and the low level of investment and scientific research carried out to date, there is the possibility of the discovery of new species. In May 2013, Novaculops alvheimia, a new species of labrid fish, was discovered on the St Brandon atoll.

=== Molluscs ===
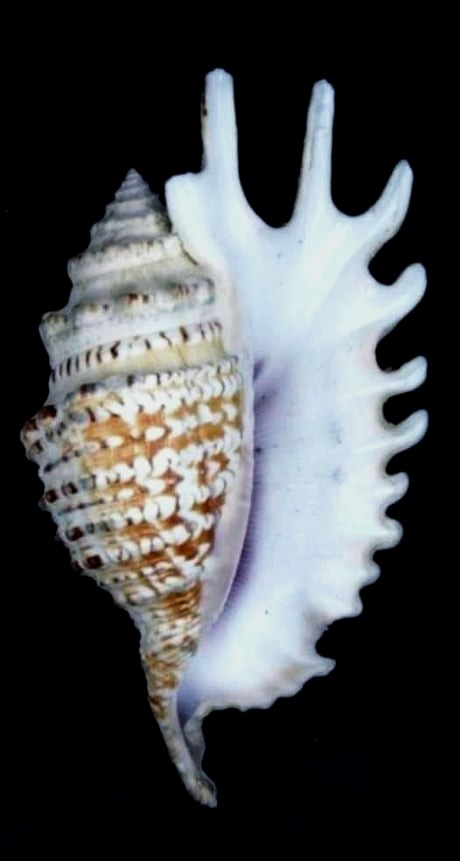
Ophioglossolambis violacea (Swainson, 1821) Naturalis Biodiversity Center

Among molluscs found in Saint Brandon, Ophioglossolambis violacea is famous for its violet hue. It is a very rare species of large sea snail (a marine gastropod mollusc in the Strombidae family) endemic to Saint Brandon. It is on the International Union for Conservation of Nature (IUCN) Red List of Threatened Species, also known as the IUCN Red List or Red Data Book, founded in 1964, which is an inventory of the global conservation status and extinction risk of biological species. Below is a selection of other molluscs from Saint Brandon.

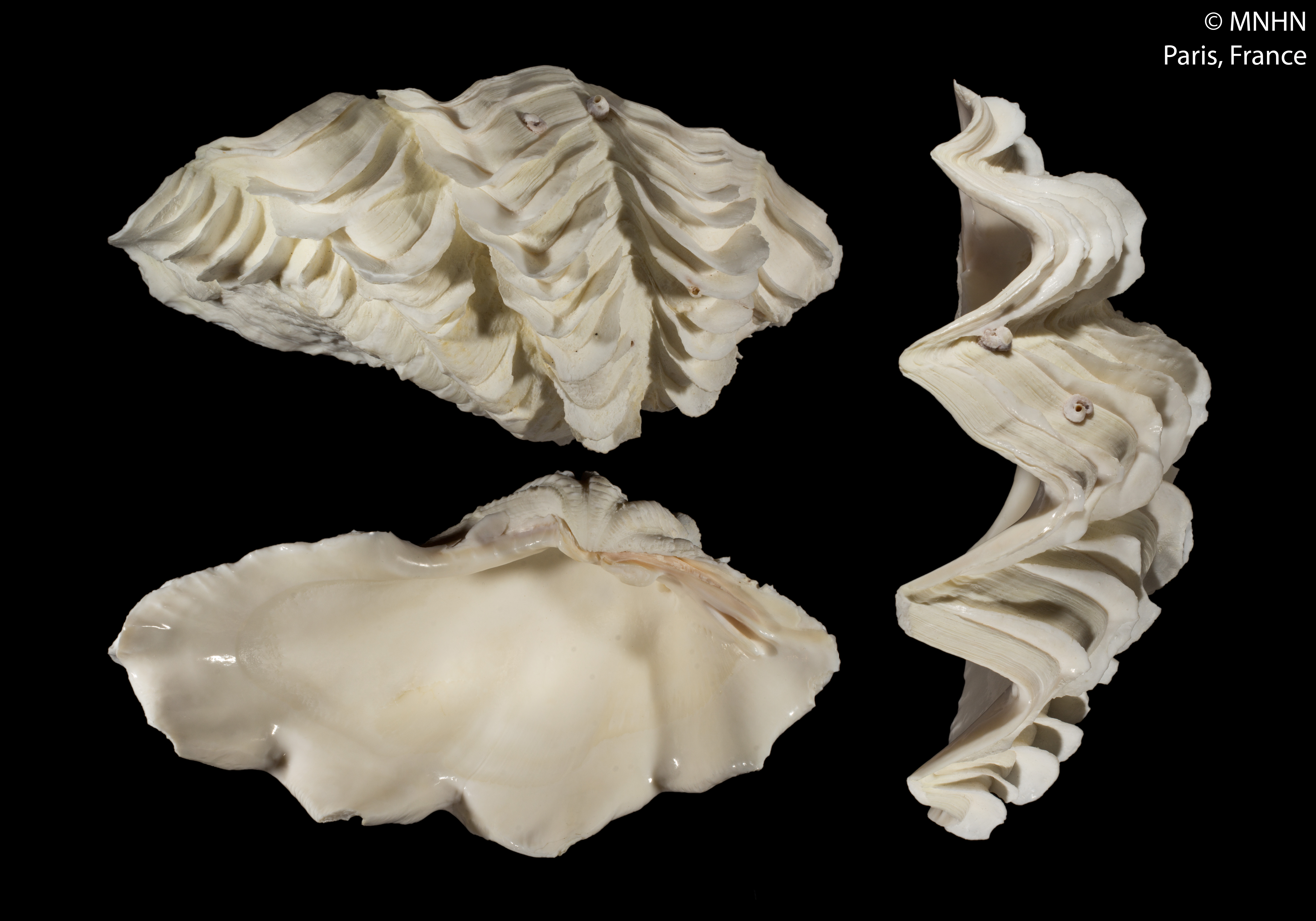
Tridacna_lorenzi_(MNHN-IM-2000-30800)_003

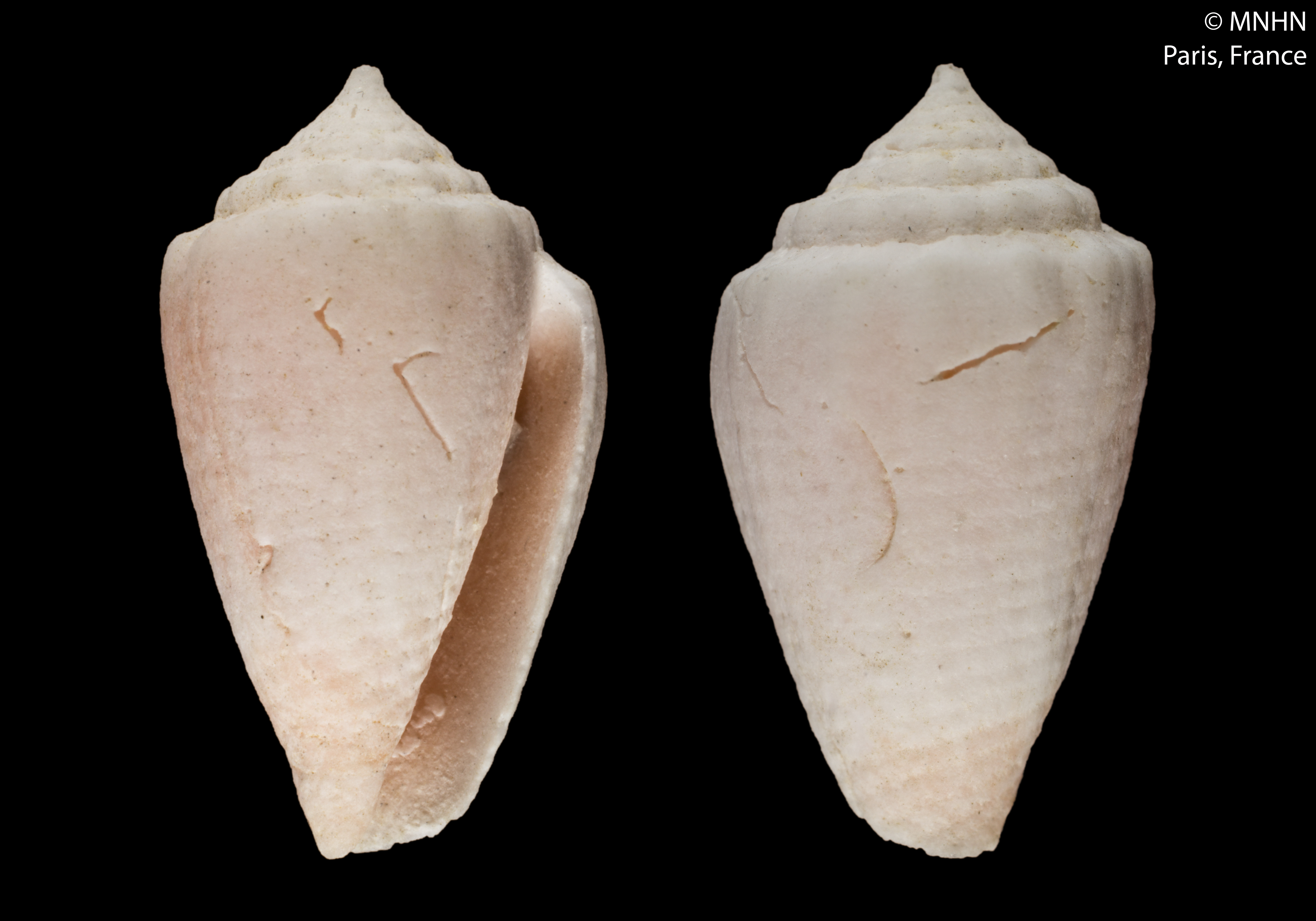
Conus_lecourtorum_(MNHN-IM-2000-24257)

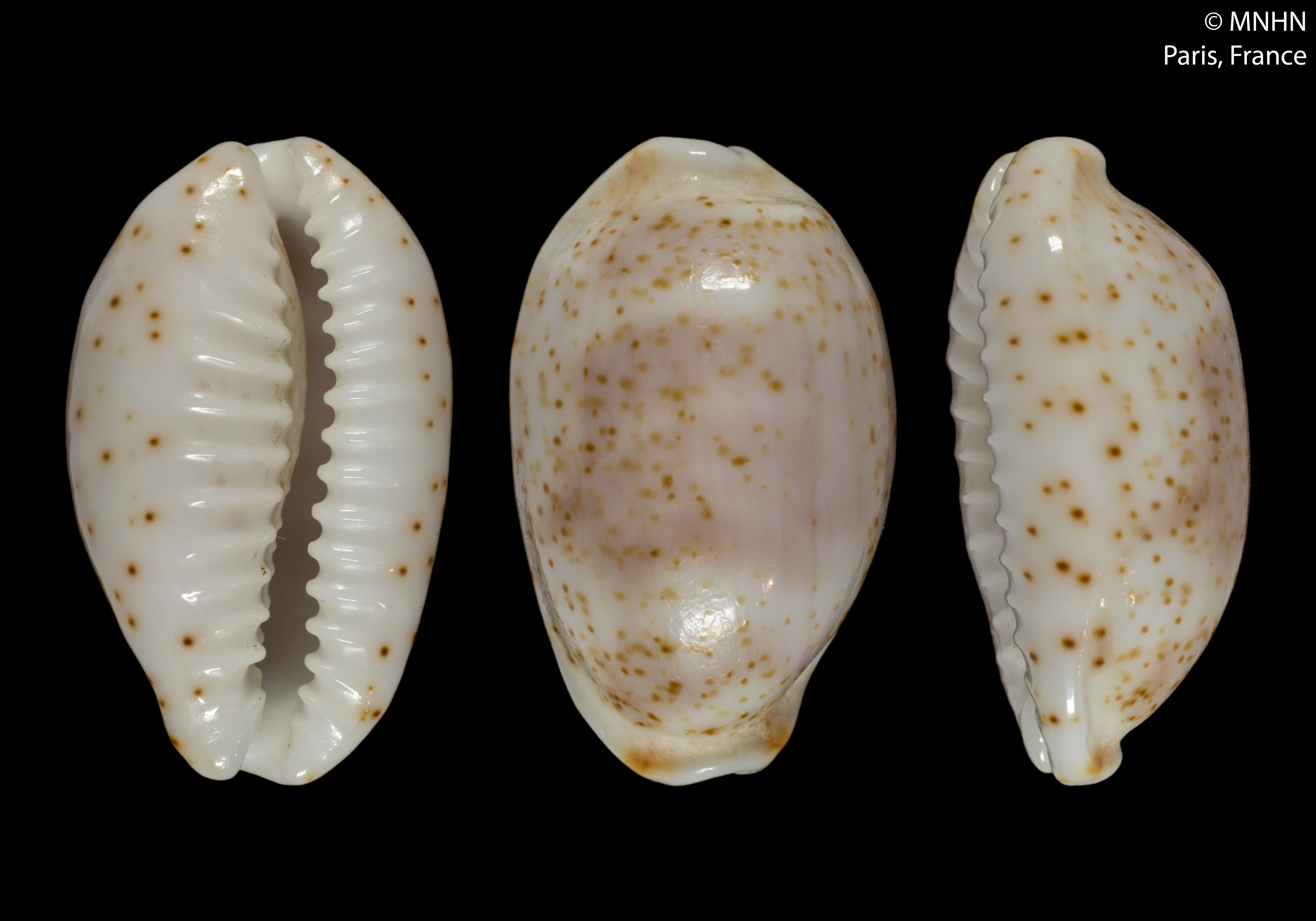
Bistolida_piae_(MNHN-IM-2000-9546)

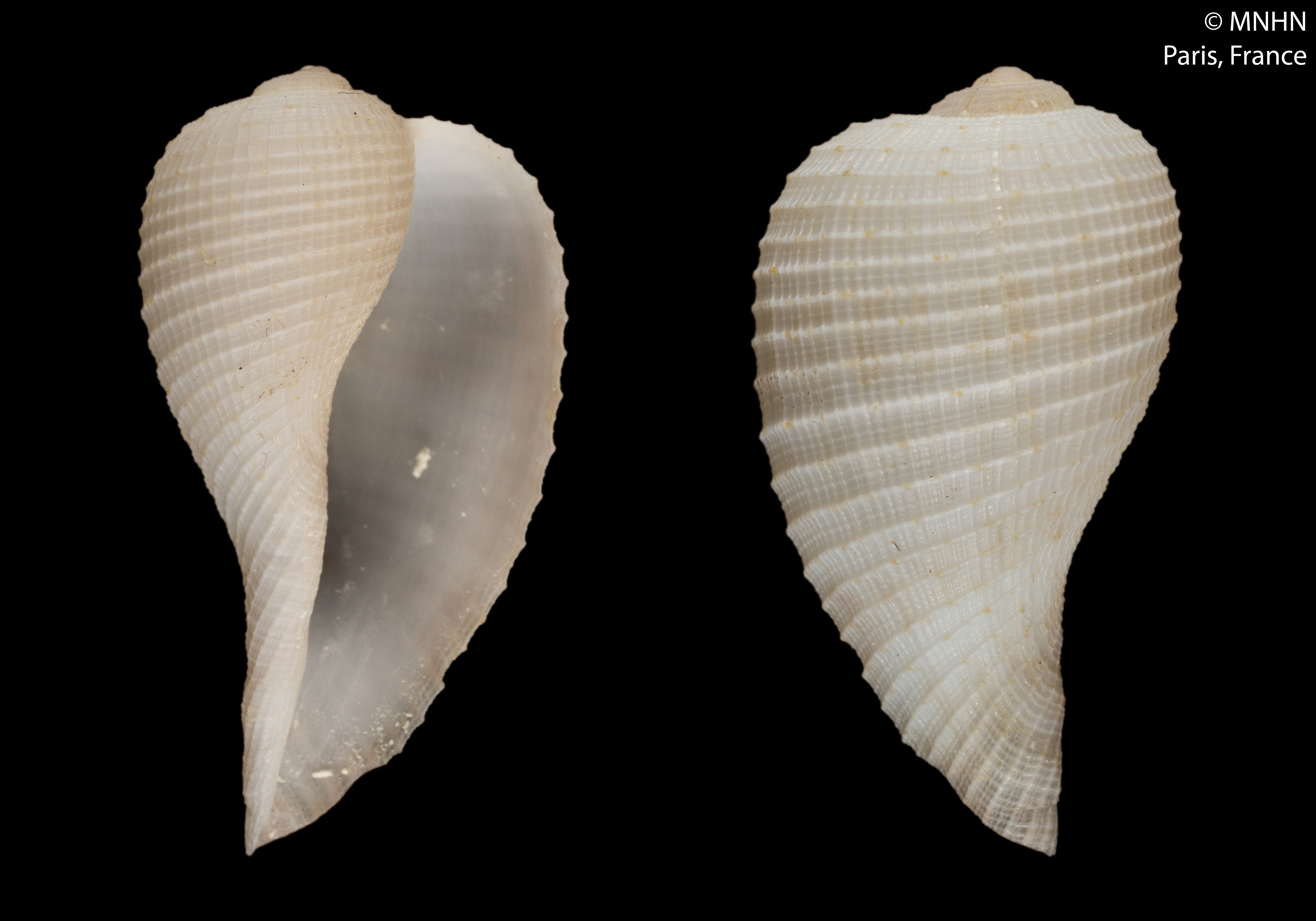
Ficus_dandrimonti_(MNHN-IM-2000-25145)

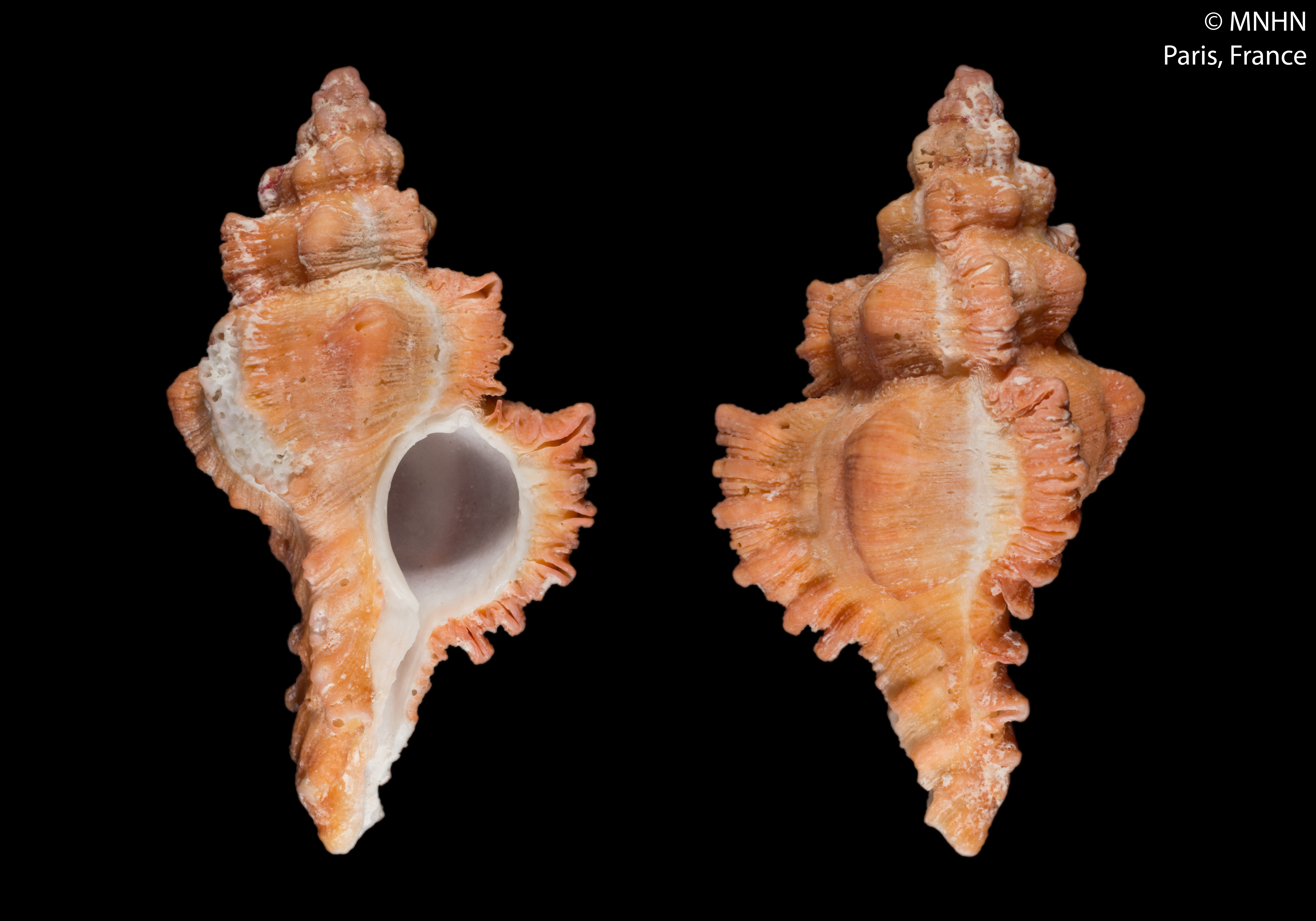
Chicoreus_janae_(MNHN-IM-2000-26871)

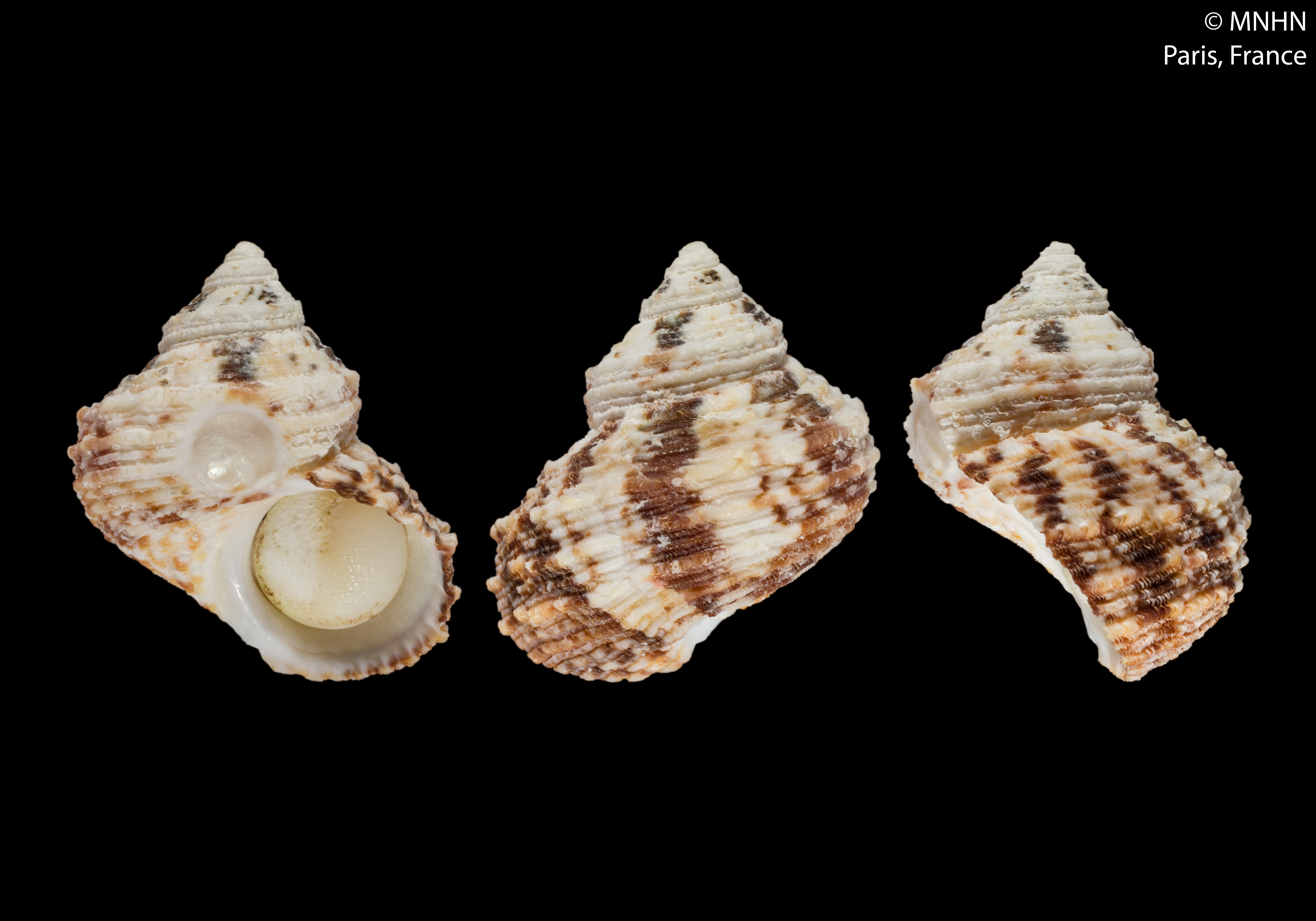
Turbo_lorenzi_(MNHN-IM-2000-27219)

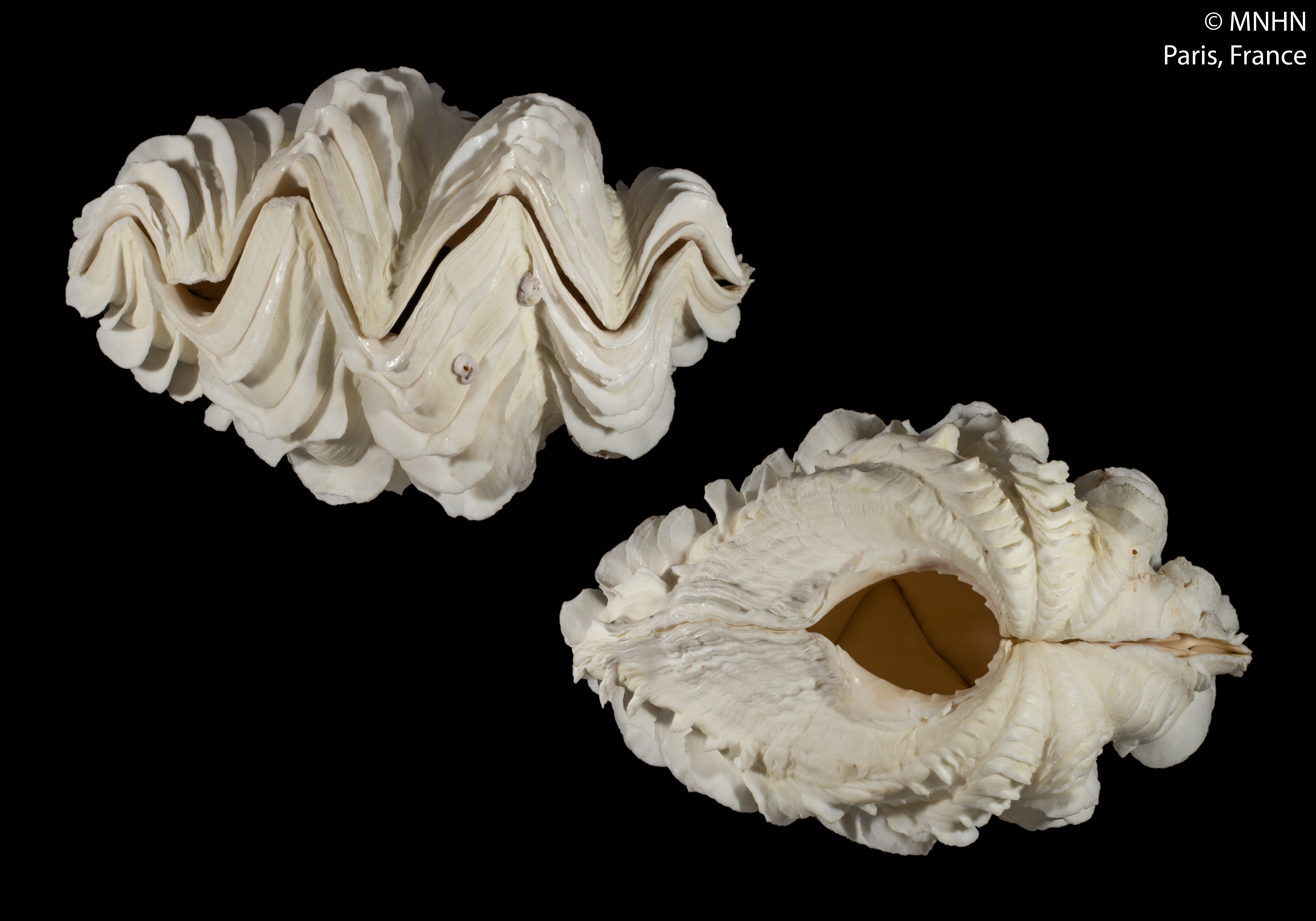
Tridacna_lorenzi_(MNHN-IM-2000-30800)_001

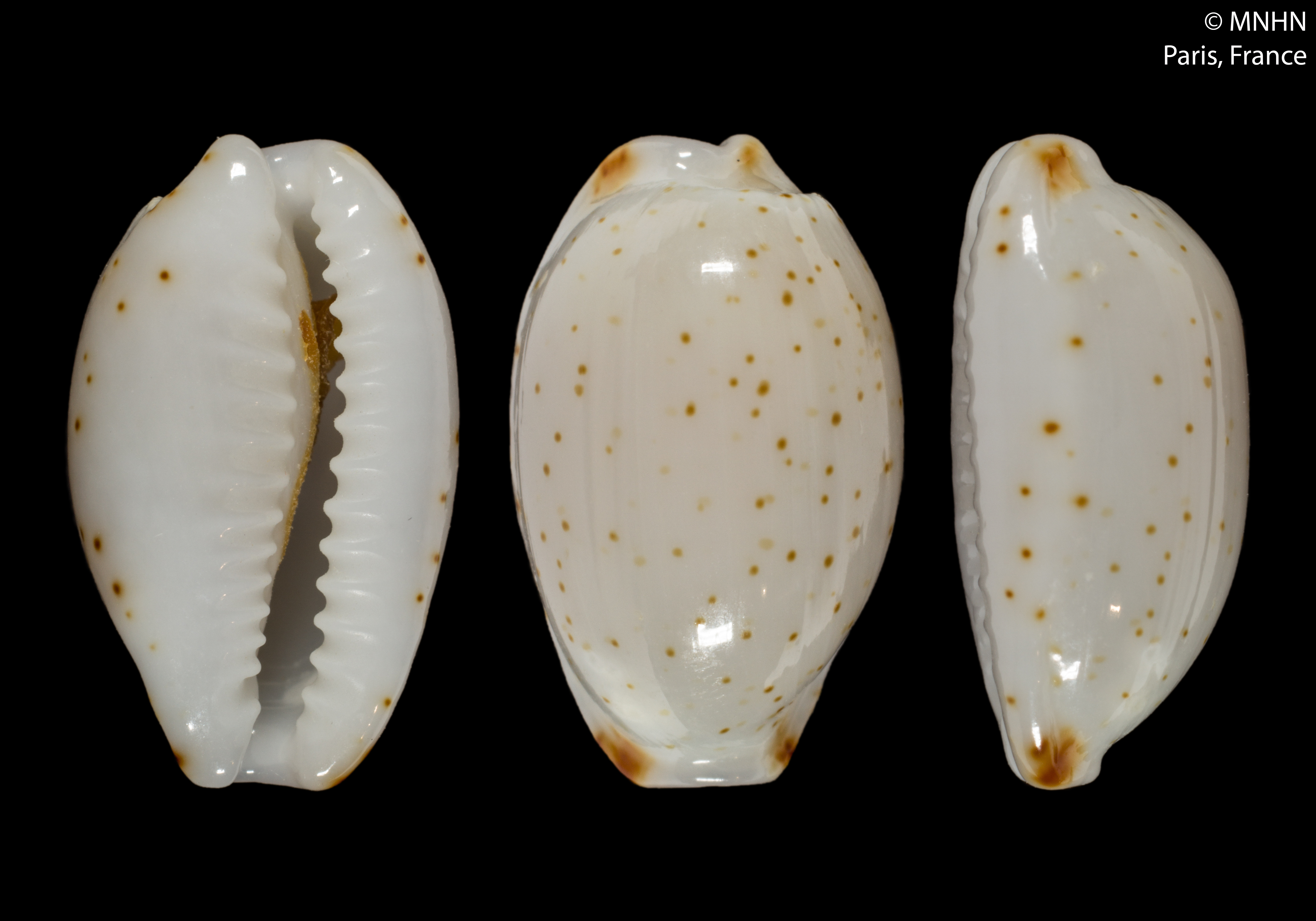
Bistolida_nanostraca_(MNHN-IM-2000-24515)

== History ==
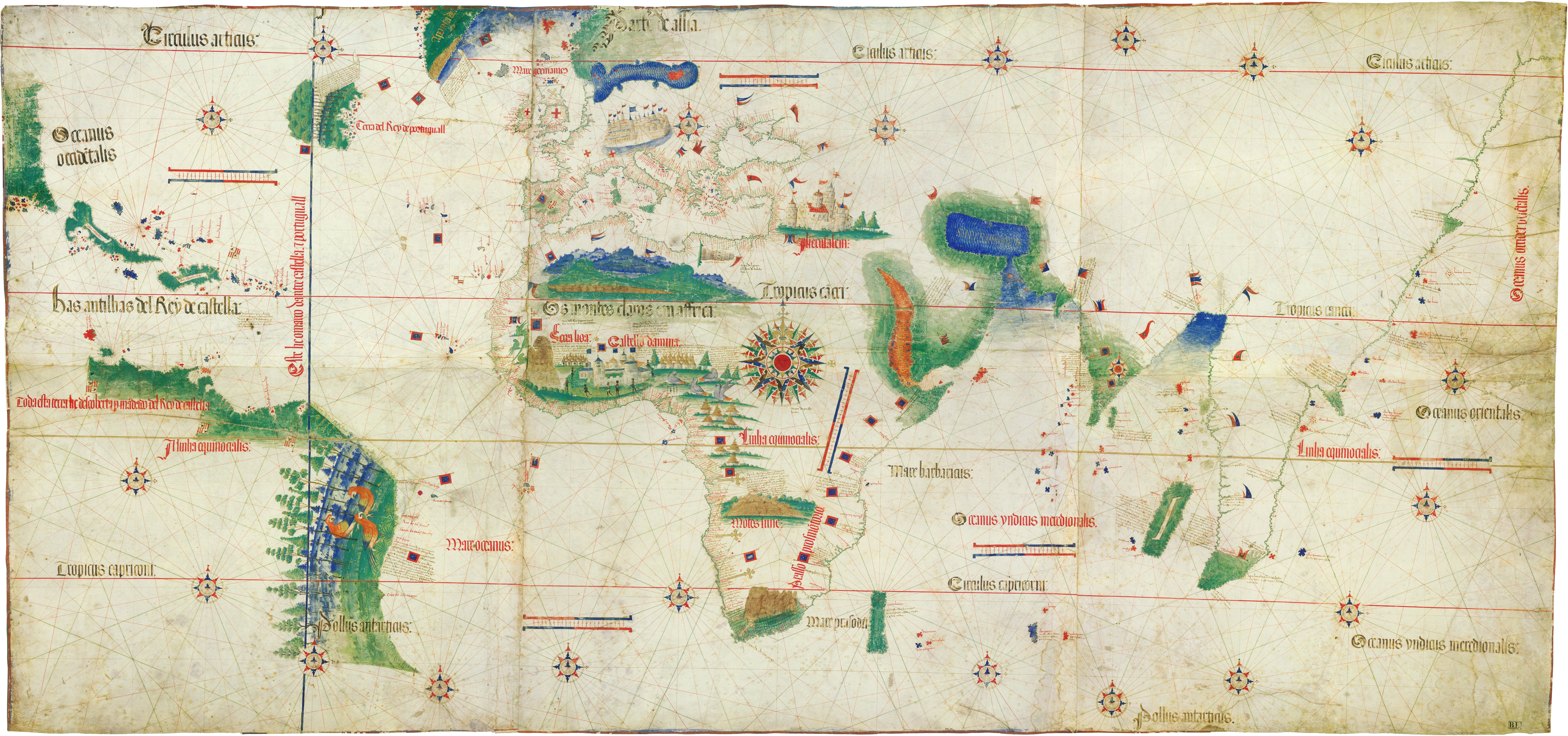
The Cantino Planisphere (1502), in the Biblioteca Estense, Modena, Italy

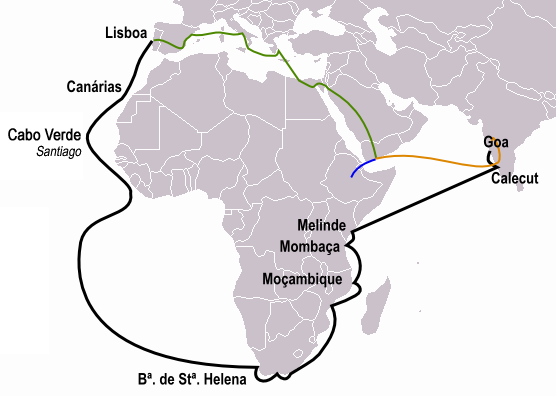
This figure illustrates the path of Vasco da Gama heading for the first time to India (black) as well as the trips of Pêro da Covilhã (orange) and Afonso de Paiva (blue). The path common to both is the green line.

Because all Portuguese maps of discovery were destroyed by the 1 November 1755 Lisbon Earthquake, there is no way of knowing for certain, but hearsay suggests that Saint Brandon was discovered around 975 A.D. by Arabian sailors along with Dina Arobi ("Abandoned Island"), now known as the island of Mauritius. It can also be found listed as Baixos on the 1502 Cantino Planisphere map, which was an illegal copy of a Portuguese map that documented the Arab discoveries and was smuggled to Italy and, for this reason, survived.

It was named Cargados Carajos in 1506 by Portuguese sailors who went ashore for provisioning after having been blown off course from their attempted passage through the Mozambique Channel (the shortest and safest route) on their way to India. Pirates and French corsairs have also used the islands as a refuge.

In 1598, the Dutch occupied the islands.

On 12 February 1662, the East India Ship Arnhem ran aground on the Saint Brandon Rocks. Volkert Evertsz, the captain, and other survivors of the wreck survived by piloting a small boat to Mauritius, and are thought to have been the last humans to see living dodos. They survived the three months until their rescue by hunting "goats, birds, tortoises and pigs". Evertsz was rescued by the English ship Truroe in May 1662. Seven of the survivors chose not to return with the first rescue ship.

Mauritius and its associated islands were colonised by the French some time around 1715, granted by the King of France to the Compagnie des Indes in 1726 but retroceded to the French Crown in 1765. Saint Brandon was referred to as Cargados in Samuel Dunn's world map of 1794.

On 9 June 1806, the French general Charles Decaen ordered the corsair Charles Nicolas Mariette to send a spying mission to Saint Brandon and to leave six men on the most prominent island and, on his return trip to Mauritius, to ascertain once and for all that Cargados Carajos and Saint Brandon were the same shoal. The frigate Piemontaise under the command of Louis Jacques Eperon le Jeune departed on 11 June 1806.

In 1810, the islands were taken by force by Britain, becoming a British crown colony.

From October to November 1917, the Saint Brandon Islands and, in particular, the lagoon of L'Île Coco, were used as a base by the German raiding vessel Wolf, commanded by Karl August Nerger. On the island, Wolf transferred stoking coal and stores from the captured Japanese ship Hitachi Maru which took three weeks. The coal was necessary for the raider's return to Germany. To do so, Wolf had to run a gauntlet of Allied warships from near the Cape of the Good Hope to the North Atlantic. On 7 November 1917, the Germans scuttled Hitachi Maru 26 km (16 mi) off shore and Wolf departed.

The most common employment on St. Brandon in 1922 was agriculture, with a manager, assistant manager and eleven labourers. Only two young men were recorded as working as fishermen. Three men worked as carpenters, one as a mason, one as a shoemaker and another as a domestic servant. There was no indication that the guano mines were operating. The islands were later mined for phosphates derived from guano until mining activities ceased in the mid-20th century.

Amateur radio operators have occasionally conducted DXpeditions on Saint Brandon. In February and March 2023, the 3B7M expedition made more than 120,000 radio contacts.

== Shipwrecks ==
Shipwrecks on the low-lying, rocky reefs of Saint Brandon have been recorded since as early as 1591.

- On 12 February 1662, the Dutch East Indiaman sailing ship Arnhem wrecked itself on the rocks at Saint Brandon.
- 1703 - The English ship Falcon, possibly associated with the East India Company or a private merchant ship, ran aground in St. Brandon and was nearly lost by Captain Edward Ledger.
- 1780s - The English ship, the Hawk, foundered on Saint Brandon on her return to Europe from Surat.

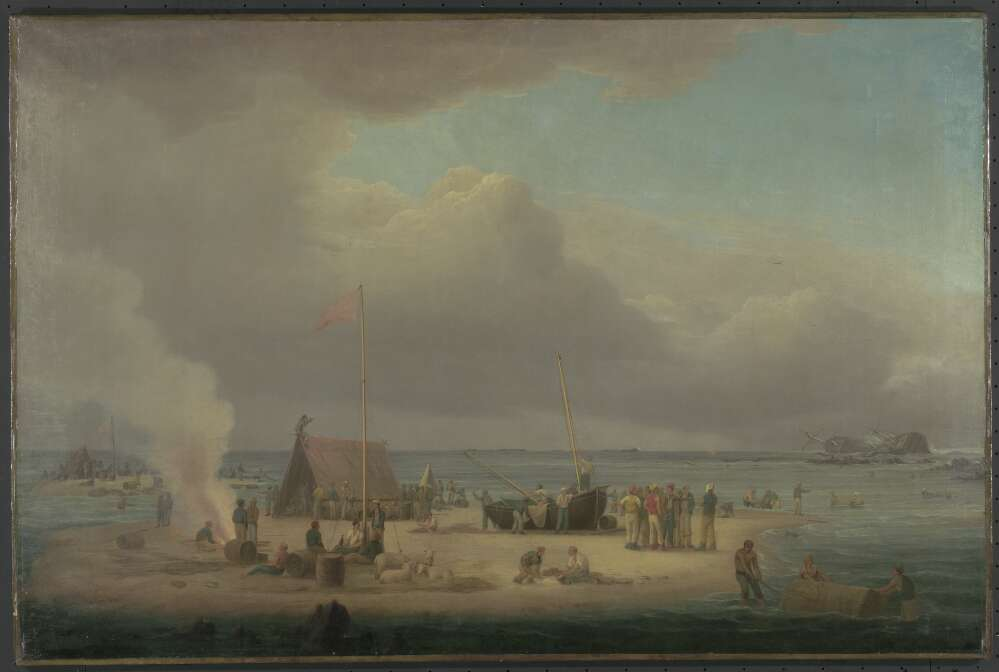
1820 oil painting of the survivors of the Cabalva wreck in Saint Brandon.

- On 25 October 1795, a vessel called l'Euphrasie arrived in Port Louis with five survivors from a shipwreck in St. Brandon related to a corsair ship called La Revanche. A certain crewman called Landier is described as leading this group of survivors. The other eight crew members perished.
- On 7 July 1818, the sailing vessel Cabalva, built by Wells, Wigram & Green in 1811 and owned by the East India Company, struck the reef at St. Brandon on its way to China and was destroyed. Captain James Dalrymple and several other lost their lives.
- On 15 September 1845, the sailing ship Letitia ran aground on the Frigate islet. Captain Malcolm drowned.
- On 16 November 1850, the barque 'Mary' also foundered on Frigate island in Saint Brandon, probably for a similar reason, namely a navigational confusion (using Horsburg's Charts) of St. 'Brandon Rocks' with the reefs of Cargados Carajos when they should be considered as one and the same group of isles, islands and reefs.
- In 1850, the sailboat 'Indian' also sank on the Saint Brandon shoals. Not much is on record about this shipwreck.
- On 3 October 1969, the Russian tugboat Argus wrecked itself on the reef at Saint Brandon. A total of 38 men were rescued.
- In 2012, a tuna longliner ran aground on the reef crest of Saint Brandon's atoll. It broke into three pieces which were moved by currents and storms into the lagoon.
- On 29 November 2014, during the second leg of the 2014–15 Volvo Ocean Race, the sailing boat Team Vestas Wind ran aground on Saint Brandon.
- On 1 February 2015, the fishing vessel Kha Yang, with 250,000 liters of fuel in its tanks, ran aground on the reef of Saint Brandon. Its crew of 20 were rescued shortly after its grounding, and a salvage operation pumped the fuel from its tanks a few weeks later.
- On 2 February 2017, the long bulk carrier Alam Manis ran aground on its way to Pipavav from Richards Bay.
- On 5 June 2021, the FV Sea Master belonging to the Mauritian company Hassen Taher was shipwrecked on Albatross Island.
- On 5 December 2022, the Taiwanese fishing vessel FV Yu Feng 67 ran aground off L'île du Sud. The twenty crew were saved by Raphaël Fishing Company vessels at the direct request of the Government at crisis meetings held in Port Louis. Seventy tonnes of diesel and around twenty tonnes of rotting bait fish gradually flowed into the lagoon and poisoned flora and fauna.

== Demographics ==
The main settlement and the administrative centre of Saint Brandon is Île Raphaël and can have up to 35 resident employees, a coast guard outpost and meteorological station (with eight residents in 1996). Smaller settlements exist on Avocaré Island, L'Île Coco, and L'île du Sud. The settlement on Albatross was abandoned in 1988.

=== Historical population ===
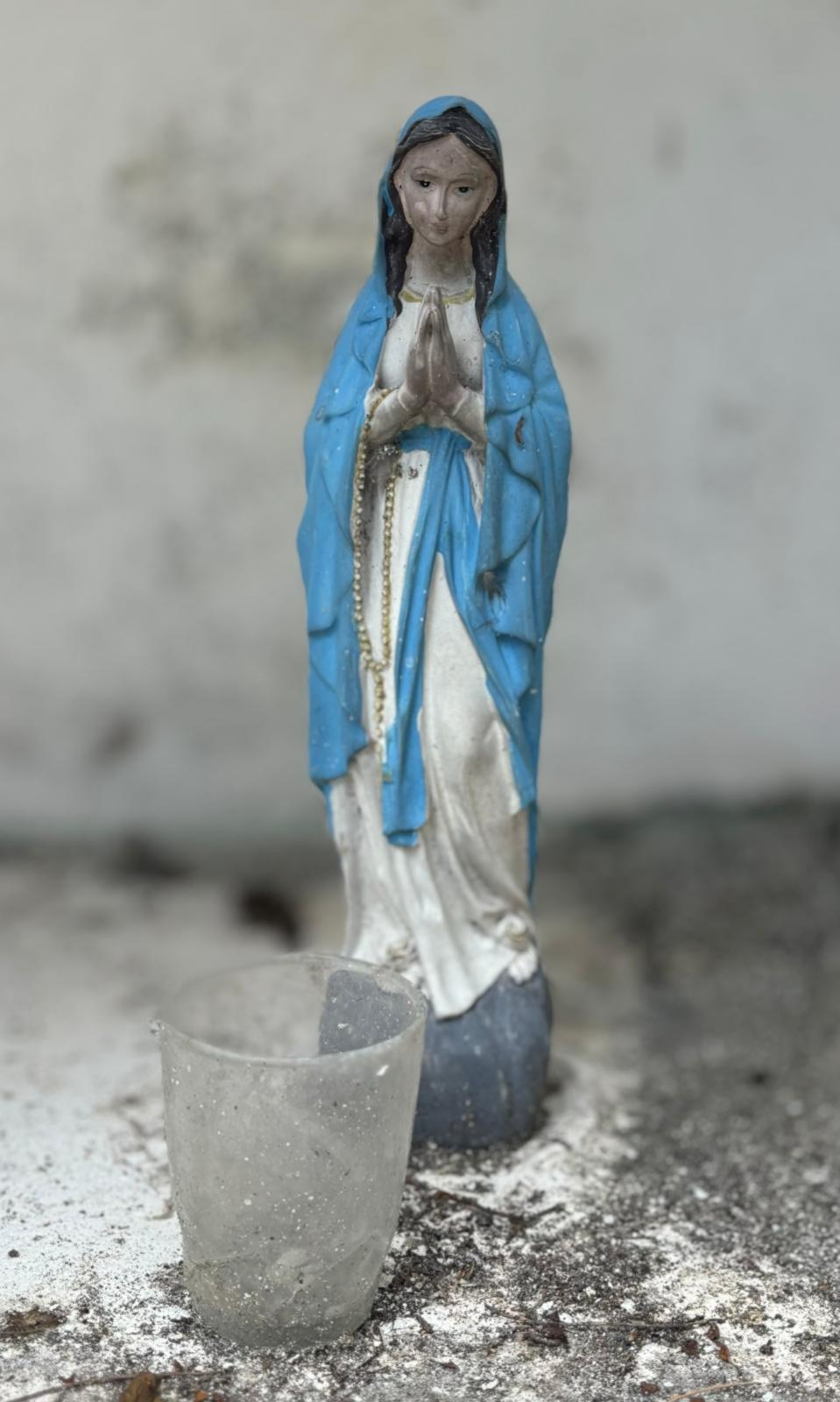
The Virgin Mary of Coco Island, Mauritius

The Saint Brandon archipelago was surveyed by British colonial authorities on 31 March 1911 as part of the Census of Mauritius. They found a total population of 110, made up of 97 men (86 non-Indian and 11 Indian) and 13 women (10 non-Indian and 3 Indian). While the archipelago likely had a resident population at this point, as indicated by the 8 children under the age of 15 and the 5 people over the age of 60, there was also likely a seasonal component, with the largest population segment being men between 20 and 35. 73 men worked in fishing, 11 at the guano mines and 4 were ship's carpenters. Only one (male) person was recorded as having been born on Saint Brandon.

In the 1921 census, the population had plummeted to just 22. There were 21 men (ages 19–48) and just one woman, a married Catholic, aged 31. A further 14 people were identified as part of the "general population", with 11 of them born on Mauritius, one on Rodrigues and two in the Seychelles. In addition, there were 3 Indo-Mauritians and 5 "other Indians" from Madras, Calcutta and Colombo.

Year	Resident	Transient	Total	Notes
1861			35	All were men.
1871			9	All were men.
1881			6	All were men.
1891			0	
1901			87	85 men and 2 women. 54 men and one woman were from the "general population"; 29 men were Indo-Mauritians, and two men and one woman were "other Indians"
1911			110	
1921			22	14 people were identified as part of the "general population", with 3 Indo-Mauritians and 5 "other Indians". 21 were men and just one was a woman.
1931			61	All were men, of whom nine were married and one was an ethnic Indian. Fishing was the occupation of 59 of the men, while two were domestic servants. Most were Catholics, but one Muslim lived on the island.
1944			93	All were men, two of them ethnic Indians, and the remainder of the "general population".
1952			136	124 men (one of whom was ethnically Chinese) and 12 women.
1962			90	
1972			128	
1983			137	
2000	0	63	63	No permanent residents. Only transient population.
2011	0			No permanent residents. Transient population not reported.

== See also ==
- Albatross Island, St. Brandon
- Avocaré Island
- Carl G. Jones
- Constitution of Mauritius
- Convention on Fishing and Conservation of the Living Resources of the High Seas
- Emphyteutic lease
- France Staub
- Geography of Mauritius
- Gerald Durrell
- History of Mauritius
- Île Verronge
- Islets of Mauritius
- L'île du Gouvernement
- L'île du Sud
- List of mammals of Mauritius
- List of marine fishes of Mauritius
- List of national parks of Mauritius
- Mascarene Islands
- Mauritian Wildlife Foundation
- Nature conservation
- Outer Islands of Mauritius
- Permanent grant
- Saint Brandon Conservation Trust
- Wildlife of Mauritius
