= Avocaré Island =

Island in Mauritius

Coordinates: 16°36′10″S 59°38′26″E

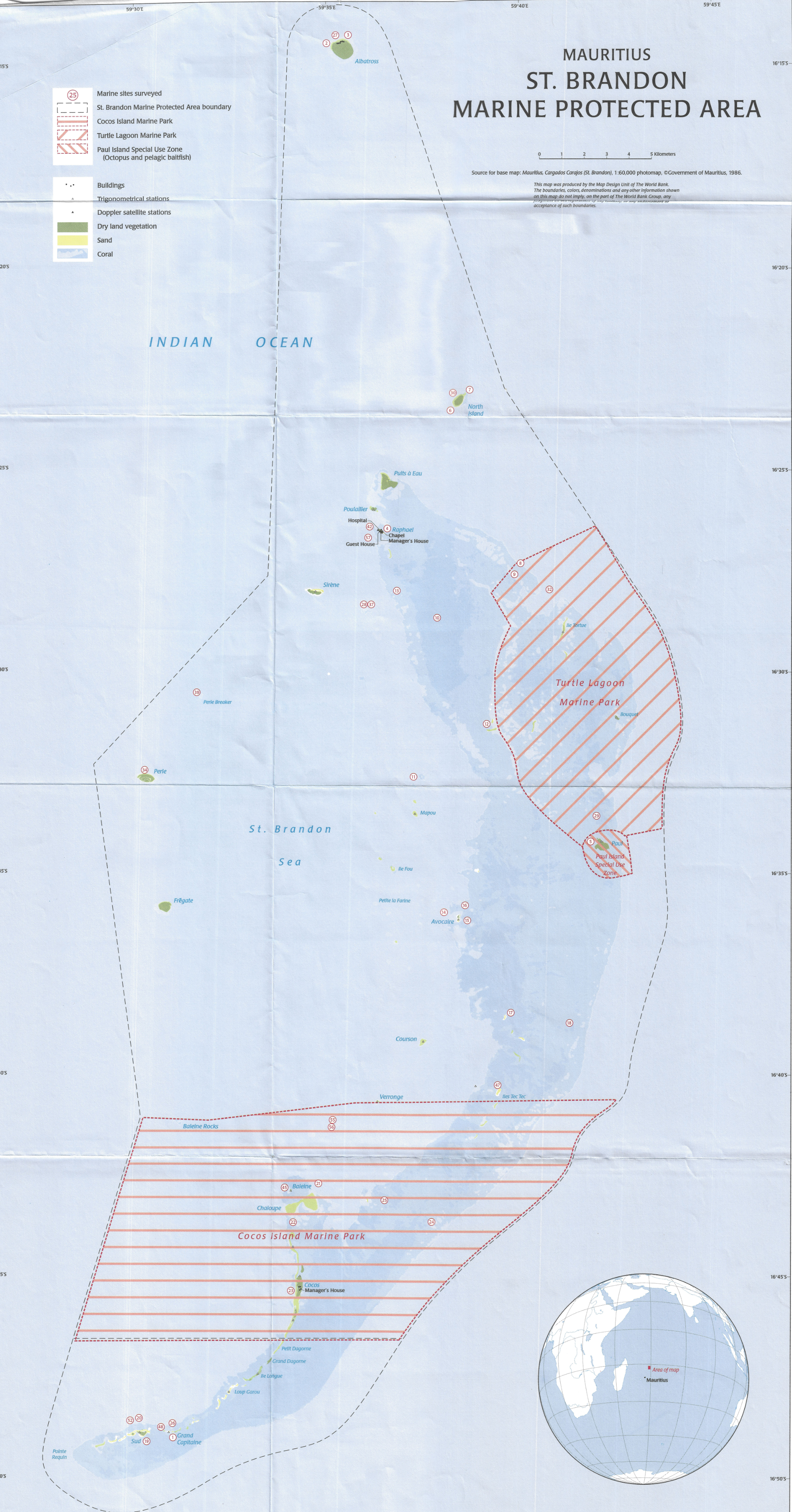
Map delineating The Saint Brandon Marine Protected Area (Cargados Carajos) by the World Bank in 1998

Avocaré Island (Avoquer, Avocaire, L'Avocaire) is an island located in the St. Brandon archipelago.

In the World Bank Report recommending the creation of the marine protected area of St. Brandon, Avocaré Island was classified as a Group 3 island together with Île Raphael, L'Île Coco and L'île du Sud.

In 1846, Avocaré Island was visited by British naval officer Edward Belcher aboard HMS Samarang, who confirmed that it was then a principal fishing station with fishermen catching 102 kg of fish per day. Avocaré Island is today an uninhabited bird and turtle sanctuary. Access to the island is restricted to prevent the introduction of invasive species.

== Key Biodiversity Area ==
Avocaré Island is one of at least thirty located on the Mauritian Cargados Carajos coral reef atoll system, part of a CEPF designated Key Biodiversity Area (KBA) of the Cargados Carajos in the Southwest Indian Ocean. The Cargados Carajos are closely skirted by busy Southeast Asian shipping lanes to the north and south, making its unique ecosystem extremely vulnerable to a variety of risks which pose threats to its long-term existence as a Key Biodiversity Area. St. Brandon (or the Cargados Carajos shoals) is a unique, isolated barrier reef atoll in the southwest Indian Ocean. It is a vital habitat for endangered marine and terrestrial species and faces an existential threat from shipwrecks, illegal fishing and pollution.

St. Brandon has more than 200 km2 of reef habitat and possesses possibly one of the most biodiverse ecosystems on earth holding over 25% of known marine species when these cover less than 1% of the sea floor. In the West, there is a coral bank and a fringing reef, dominated by staghorn Acropora, classified as threatened by the US National Marine Fisheries Service in 2014. To the East of the atoll, there is a greater coral diversity including a rare species of the Pavona coral. There are persistent, but as yet unproven rumours, of the presence of rare brain corals around Avocaré Island waiting to be discovered and preserved for posterity.

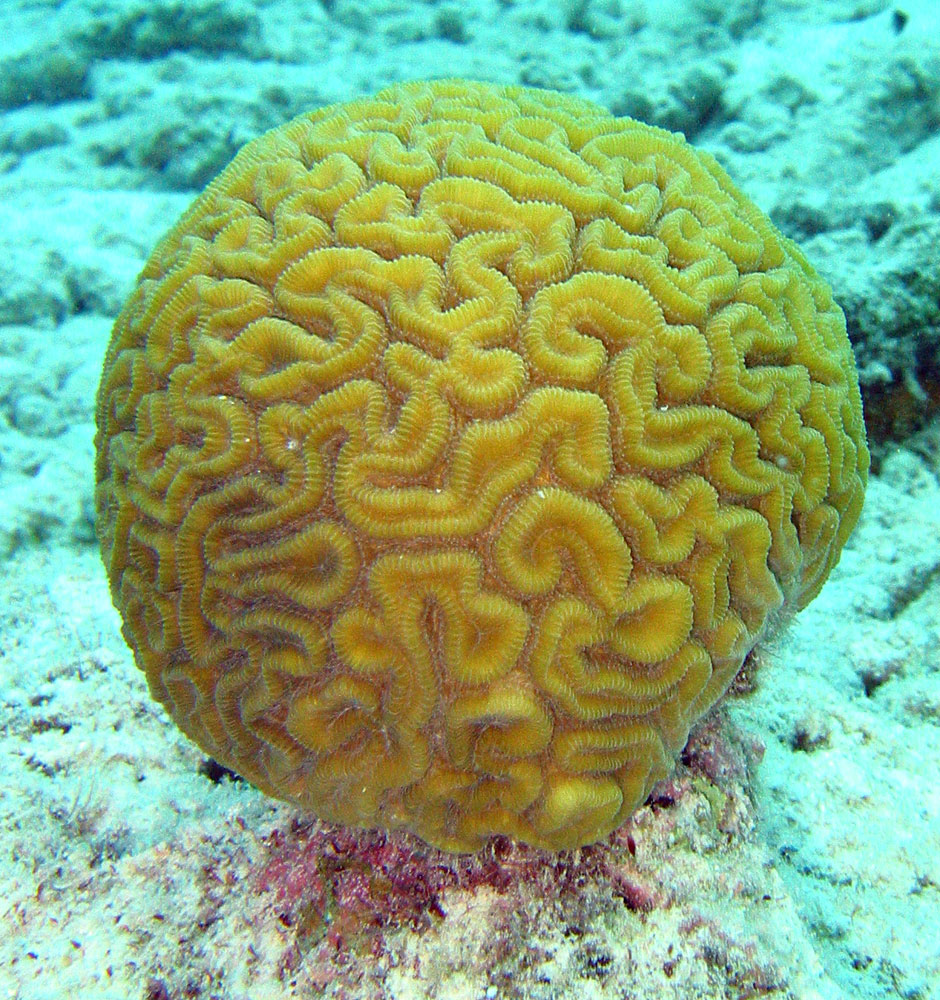
Brain_coral

== See also ==
- Mascarene Islands
- St. Brandon
- Mauritius
- Île Raphael
- L'île du Sud
- L'île du Gouvernement
- L'Île Coco
