= Constitution of Mauritius =

Supreme law of Mauritius

The Constitution of the Republic of Mauritius (French: La Constitution de Maurice) is the supreme law of Mauritius, according to Chapter I, Section 2 of the constitution, if any other law is inconsistent with this Constitution, that other law shall, to the extent of the inconsistency, be void. The current Constitution was adopted in 1968. It defines Mauritius as a sovereign democratic State which shall be known as the Republic of Mauritius. The Constitution guarantees to the individual his fundamental rights: life, liberty, security of the person and the protection of the law, freedom of conscience, of expression, of assembly and association and freedom to establish schools and the right of the individual to protection for the privacy of his home and other property and from deprivation of property without compensation. The individual rights protected in the Constitution are mainly negative rights, as opposed to positive rights. The Constitution establishes clearly the separation of powers between the legislative, the executive and the judiciary. The Constitution establishes a Supreme Court with unlimited jurisdiction to hear all cases, as well as two courts of appeal, divisions of the Supreme Court, to hear intermediate civil and criminal cases.

== See also ==
- Constitution of Mauritius (1885)
- Supreme Court of Mauritius
- Agalega
- Politics of Mauritius
- Permanent Grant
- Judicial Committee of the Privy Council
