= L'île du Gouvernement =

Island in the St. Brandon archipelago

Coordinates: 16°23′39″S 59°38′7″E

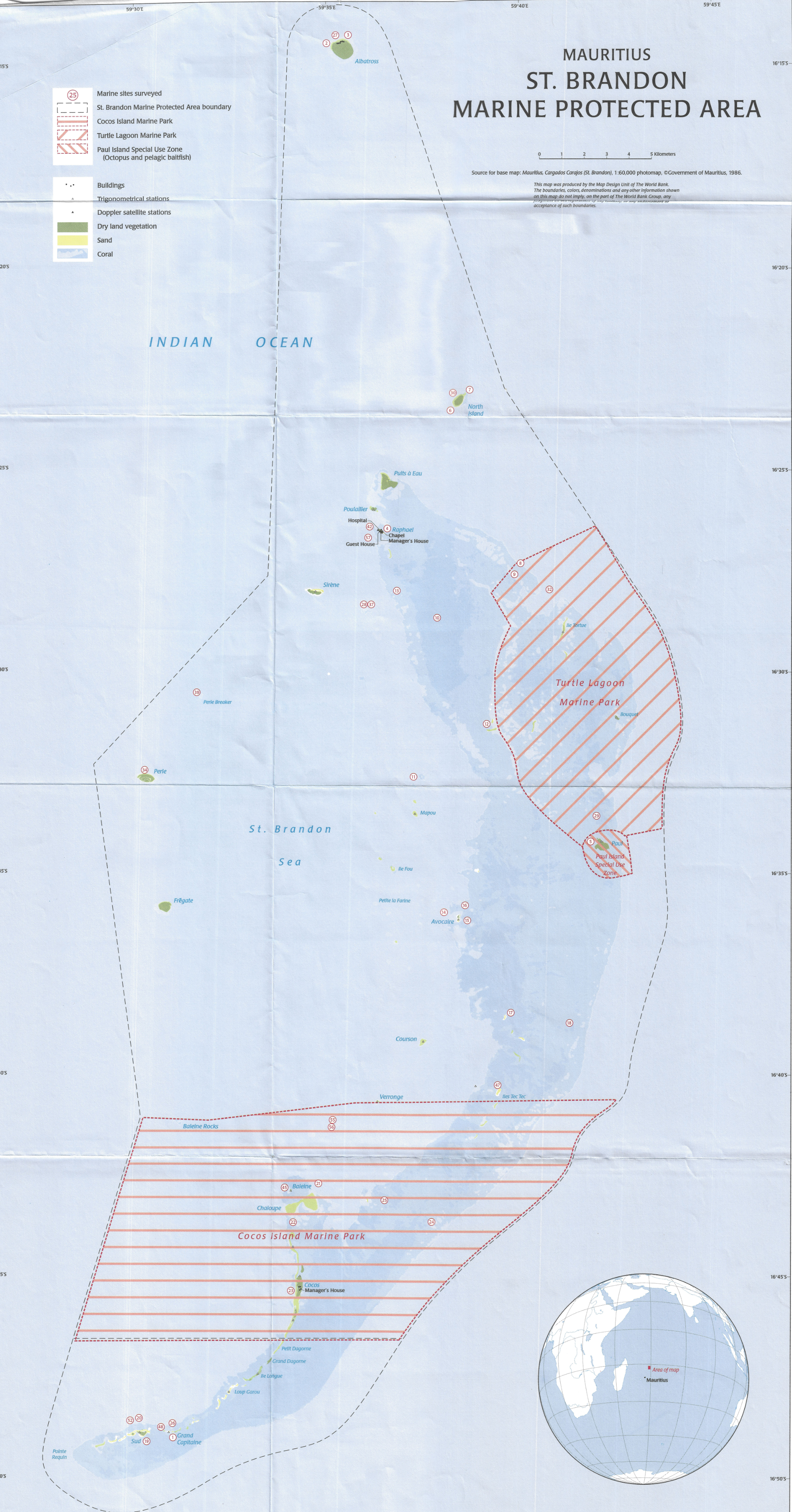
Map delineating The Saint Brandon Marine Protected Area (Cargados Carajos) by the World Bank in 1998

l'île du Gouvernement is an island in the St. Brandon archipelago. The island is uninhabited, and mostly functions as a bird and turtle sanctuary.

This island was one of those recommended as part of the St. Brandon Marine Protected Area (MPA) by the World Bank in 1998. The World Bank’s Management Plan was accepted at Ministry level in its ”Blue Print for the Management of St. Brandon” (2002) which was thereafter approved by the government of Mauritius in 2004.
