= Mauritian Wildlife Foundation =

Non-profit conservation agency in Mauritius

The logo of the Mauritian Wildlife Foundation is the Mauritius kestrel

The Mauritian Wildlife Foundation (MWF) is an independent, non-governmental, non-profit conservation agency working in Mauritius and the Outer Islands to save threatened endemic local flora and fauna.

The MWF is currently working to conserve the following species:

- Pink pigeon
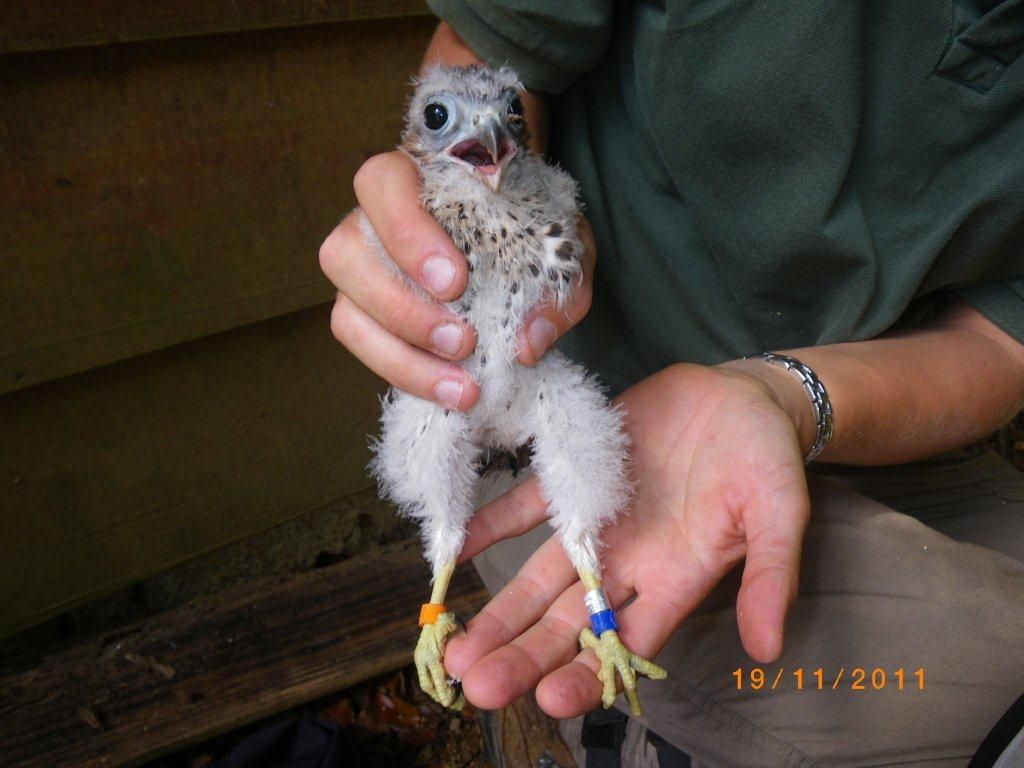
- Mauritius Kestrel born in Jean Raymond Boulle Kestrel Valley, close to Mahebourg in 2011.
  Mauritius kestrel
- Echo parakeet
- Rodrigues fruit bat
- Mauritius fody
- Mauritius cuckoo-shrike
- Mauritius bulbul
- Mauritius paradise flycatcher
- Mauritius olive white-eye
- Phelsuma day geckos
- Nactus night geckos
- Round Island boa
- Telfair's skink
- Bojer's skink
- Macchabe skink
- Bouton's skink

== History ==
The Mauritian Wildlife Appeal Fund was established in 1984 as the pioneering initiative of naturalist Gerald Durrell and the Jersey Wildlife Preservation Trust principally to raise funds for the conservation of endemic Mauritius wildlife. The conservation work in Mauritius began as a species-orientated program concentrating on a few critically endangered species such as the Mauritius kestrel and the pink pigeon at the Gerald Durrell Endemic Wildlife Sanctuary. The sanctuary is associated with Mauritius' conservation movement from its roots in the 1970s and is run jointly by the National Parks and Conservation Service and Mauritian Wildlife Foundation, with the help of the Durrell Wildlife Conservation Trust. The initiation of the Mauritius conservation program in 1976 was popularized by Gerald Durrell in his book Golden Bats and Pink Pigeons.

1996: the organisation expanded its operations to habitat restoration, including the management of native forests and small islands around Mauritius and in the Outer Islands. Its evolution from a funding-and-administration organisation to a hands-on conservation agency was reflected in the new name adopted that year, the Mauritian Wildlife Foundation (MWF).

The Foundation is today perfecting whole ecosystem management and restoration, which includes predator and pest (weed) control. It also has captive breeding programs for animals, and endemic plant nurseries. This work is being done at Brise Fer in the Black River Gorges National Park, and on the islands of Ile aux Aigrettes, Round Island, and Rodrigues Island.

1998:, MWF expanded its activities into two new fields: ecotourism on Ile aux Aigrettes and an Environmental Education programme in Rodrigues.

March 2016: the President’s report of the Mauritian Wildlife Foundation declared St. Brandon an official MWF project to promote the conservation of the atoll at a national and international level.

2020: in the aftermath of the MV Wakashio oil spill reaching Ile aux Aigrettes which occurred during the Corona Virus Pandemic lockdown, an important rescue was coordinated, engineered and financed by the Jean Boulle Group (owned by Mauritian Jean-Raymond Boulle) working closely with Mauritian Wildlife Foundation, (MWF) Durrell Wildlife Conservation Trust, BirdLife International, National Parks and Conservation Service of Mauritius (NPCS), and the Forestry Service. The Jean Boulle Group provided its corporate executive jet to enable the emergency rescue of three species of rare reptiles (Gongylomorphus bojerii, Cryptoblepharus boutonii) and the lesser night gecko) which might otherwise be facing extinction, following the Wakashio oil spill in Mauritius. Small numbers of lesser night geckos, Bojer's skink (Critically Endangered (IUCN 3.1)), and Bouton Skinks were captured by MWF from the southeast islands of Mauritius and held in a temporary bio-secure holding facility on the mainland. The reptiles were safely transported to Jersey Zoo by the Jean Boulle Group plane where they have received expert care from leading herpetologists and this safety net population forms part of a breeding programme from which the animals, their offspring or future generations can eventually be released back into the wild. Moving the reptiles to Jersey is a lifeline in establishing assurance populations of these animals and their unique genes away from the disaster zone until the long-term impacts of the MV Wakashio oil spill are fully understood. These offshore islands offer a unique diversity in plant and animal life and are home to some of the world’s rarest species, which are found nowhere else on Earth. Dr Vikash Tatayah, MWF Conservation Director, said, This rescue is our chance to prevent other Mauritian species following the same route as the Dodo, whose extinction wasn’t immediately noticed. When the double crisis of the Wakashio oil spill and the COVID-19 pandemic is consigned to memory, this effort could have avoided a “second dodo moment” for Mauritius. This rescue is our chance to save these unique Mauritian species and secure a lasting gene-pool so that they can be re-introduced one day. Everyone at MWF and Durrell is so grateful to the Jean Boulle Group, who have understood how critical it is that we get these reptiles to Jersey Zoo as soon as possible so they are away from the environmental disaster zone.

2020: The St Brandon Institutional Mapping and Action Plan was finalised.

== See also ==
- Gerald Durrell
- Saint Brandon Conservation Trust
- Durrell Wildlife Conservation Trust
- Wildlife Trust (US)
- Wildlife Preservation Canada
- Mascarene Islands
- St Brandon
- L'île du Gouvernement
