= Jean-Raymond Boulle =

Diamond and mineral businessman

Jean-Raymond Boulle COR
- Born: 10 October 1950 (age 76); Curepipe, then part of British Mauritius
- Known for: Discoverer of ore deposits at Voisey's Bay Mine
- Spouse: Nathalie Anne Parvin (m. 1990)
- Children: 2 sons

Jean-Raymond Boulle COR (born 10 October 1950) is a Monaco-based Mauritian businessman and the founder of four publicly traded companies with deposits of nickel, cobalt, copper, zinc, titanium and diamonds.

== Career ==
=== Early career ===
Boulle worked for the De Beers Diamond Trading Company (DTC) for ten years, in Zaire, Sierra Leone and Antwerp, Belgium. He then established Boulle Inc. in Dallas, Texas.

He began exploring for diamonds in 1984, first in Minnesota and then in Arkansas. In 1987, he formed Arkansas Diamond Development Co. to carry out exploration work on the Crater of Diamonds State Park in Arkansas.

=== Diamond Fields and Voisey's Bay Mine ===
Boulle was chairman, founder and CEO, as well as a major shareholder, of Diamond Fields Resources (TSE:DFR), which commenced trading on the Vancouver Stock Exchange on 6 April 1993. In late 1994, prospectors with Archean Resources discovered nickel, copper and cobalt ore bodies at Voisey's Bay Mine in Labrador, Canada. The deposit was estimated to contain 141 million tonnes at 1.6% nickel. Boulle and Robert Friedland worked together in the vehicle, and in 1996 the project was purchased by Inco for C$4.3 billion. Boulle's next company, Diamond Fields International, is involved in seafloor mining with interests in deposits around the world.

=== American Mineral Fields ===
His Boulle Mining Group is headquartered in Luxembourg and in 1995 founded American Mineral Fields (later renamed Adastra Minerals), listed on the London Stock Exchange's Alternative Investment Market and the Toronto Stock Exchange. Adastra Minerals developed mining projects in the Democratic Republic of the Congo and a joint venture with the Congolese government to re-treat the Kolwezi tailings project. Adastra Minerals was purchased in August 2006 by First Quantum Minerals, a mining company then with dual listings on the Toronto Stock Exchange and the London Stock Exchange (until 31 May 2016). In 2001, Boulle acquired the Sierra Rutile Project (a producer of natural rutile) and the Sierra Minerals SML Bauxite Mine in Sierra Leone, West Africa, which became part of Titanium Resources Group, taken public on the London Stock Exchange's Alternative Investment Market in August 2005.

=== Greenland Gold Resources and Greenland Anorthosite ===
His mining group's subsidiary company, Greenland Gold Resources Ltd, is exploring in Greenland for nickel, copper, cobalt, platinum group elements, titanium and graphite. His other Greenland company, Greenland Anorthosite, has attracted co-investment from the Danish national investment fund Vækstfonden, the Greenland state investment company Greenland Venture A/S and the Greenlandic pension fund SISA.

=== Tendyne Holdings ===
In December 2014, Boulle's company Tendyne Holdings Inc. announced the first successful human mitral valve implant at the Royal Brompton Hospital in London.

In September 2015, an agreement was reached with Abbott Laboratories to acquire Tendyne Holdings Inc. for a total consideration of US$400 million ($250 million plus regulatory-based milestones), excluding Abbott Laboratories' existing 10% of the company.

In February 2020, the Tendyne transcatheter mitral heart valve implant developed by Tendyne Holdings received CE Mark approval from the European Union, becoming the first commercially available mitral valve replacement technology.

In May 2025, the Tendyne transcatheter mitral heart valve implant received FDA approval in the United States for mitral valve replacement without open-heart surgery.

=== Trained Therapeutix Discovery ===
Boulle's company Trained Therapeutix Discovery and its co-founders Professor Mihai Netea and Leo Joosten have revealed that innate immune systems have adaptive characteristics. This de facto innate immune memory was coined "trained immunity" by Netea.

In 2022, Boulle and the Spanish Society of Immunology (Sociedad Española de Inmunología, or SEI) founded the Boulle-SEI International Awards to acknowledge and support the work of the healthcare and life sciences community.

=== World Titanium Resource ===
Boulle Mining Group Luxembourg was the largest shareholder in World Titanium Resources, the Australian Securities Exchange-listed discoverers and owners of the Toliara Sands titanium deposit in Madagascar. World Titanium Resources was delisted from the ASX on 30 January 2017 and is now privately owned as World Titane Holdings Limited. In December 2017, Base Resources signed a $75 million agreement to acquire an 85% interest in the Toliara Sands project in Madagascar from World Titane Holdings Limited.

=== Omnicane ===
Together with the National Pension Fund and the Sugar Investment Trust of Mauritius, Boulle is one of the major shareholders of Omnicane, a publicly listed company on the Stock Exchange of Mauritius. Omnicane owns sugarcane plantations in Mauritius and produces refined sugar, in addition to providing some electricity to the island.

=== Raphael Fishing Company ===
Boulle is the majority shareholder in the Raphael Fishing Company, a 99-year-old company which made legal history in 2008 when it was adjudged a Permanent Grant by the United Kingdom Privy Council on the Thirteen Islands of St Brandon (Cargados Carajos). The permanent grant was confirmed based on an earlier permanent lease (999-year lease) dating back to 1901.

=== Other work ===
In November 2012, entertainment industry media outlet Variety reported that the Jean Boulle Group owned the adaptation rights for the 1969 counterculture classic film Easy Rider, originally released by Columbia Pictures, and were part of a consortium including Maurice Fadida's Kodiak Pictures and Defiant Studios' Eric B. Fleischman.

Boulle is Vice Chairman of the Board of Directors of the US-based Corporate Council on Africa.

In 1999 and 2000, Boulle was a prime mover in the creation of the African Growth and Opportunity Act (AGOA), the primary governing US law on trade with Africa. AGOA provides duty-free treatment to goods of designated sub-Saharan African countries and includes Mauritius. The programme promotes economic growth through good governance and free markets, covering both textile and non-textile goods, and was most recently reauthorised to 30 September 2025.

In 2002, Boulle sponsored and promoted Mauritius as a venue and helped to organise the Second US-SSA AGOA Forum on 13 January 2003.

== Conservation ==
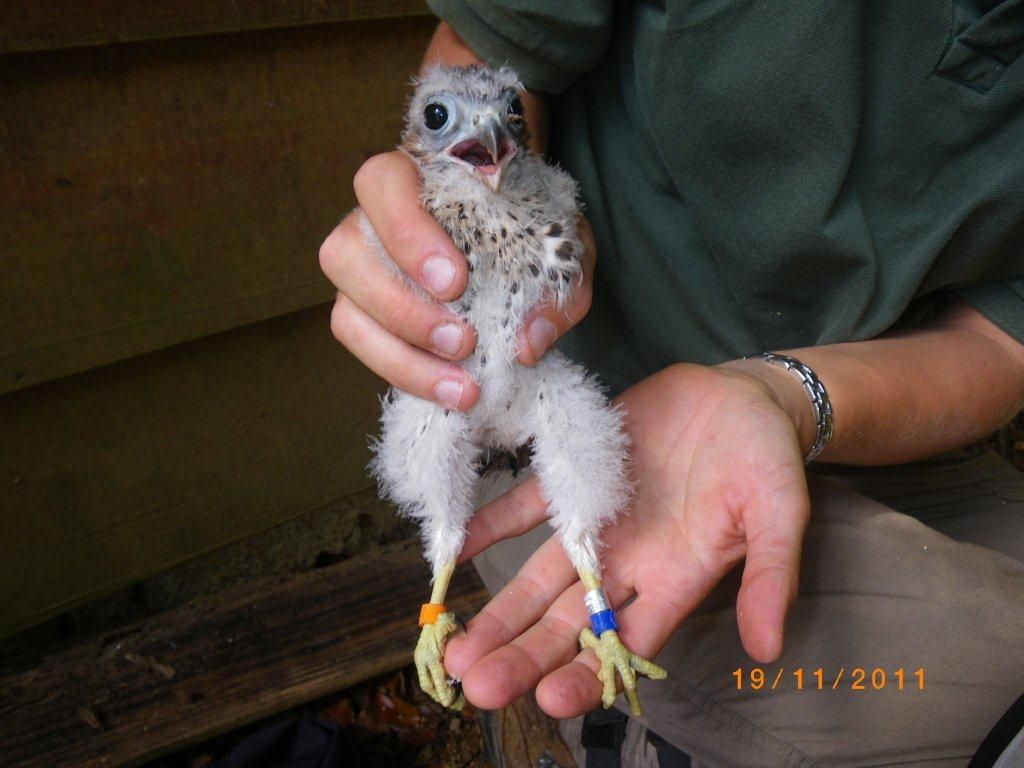
2011 Mauritius kestrel in Boulle's Kestrel Valley, Mauritius

=== Cargados Carajos ===
At the request of the Mauritius government in February 1997, the World Bank, together with the Swedish International Development Cooperation Agency, financed and produced a management plan for Saint Brandon in 1998. The plan recommended the creation of the Marine Protected Area of Saint Brandon based on the Great Barrier Reef model.

The Mauritian Government's Ministry of Shipping, Rodrigues and Outer Islands blueprint on the Cargados Carajos group of islands (Saint Brandon) in 2004 recommended that the government apply to the World Heritage Committee for the inclusion of Saint Brandon in the World Heritage List. (See Page 18, Section 6 (d))

In April 2016, Boulle's Jean Boulle Group funded and organised a seven-day fact-finding mission in the Mascarene Islands for three conservation experts to Île Raphael, one of the Thirteen Islands of St. Brandon held in permanent grant by the Raphael Fishing Company in the Cargados Carajos archipelago: Professor Henk Bouwman (ecotoxicology, environmental pollution, bird ecology); Professor Tony Martin (marine mammals); and Dr Nick Cole (herpetologist; MWF Islands Restoration Manager). These experts inspected the islands to raise awareness about the need to protect their unique biodiversity and to investigate the effects of plastic and heavy metal pollution in the Indian Ocean. The St. Brandon Archipelago has been declared an Important Bird Area by BirdLife International.

=== Mahebourg ===
In 2020, in the aftermath of the MV Wakashio oil spill, the Jean Boulle Group enabled the emergency rescue of three species of rare reptiles (lesser night gecko, Bojer's skink (Gongylomorphus bojerii, critically endangered), and Bouton's skink (Cryptoblepharus boutonii)) from Mauritius and transported them to the Durrell Wildlife Conservation Trust in Jersey. Moving the reptiles to Jersey offered a lifeline in establishing assurance populations well away from the disaster zone until the long-term impacts of the oil spill are fully understood.

=== Controversy ===
Boulle's American Mineral Fields was associated, together with other multinational companies, with allegedly profiting from conflict in the Democratic Republic of the Congo (1998) and manipulating African governments (2000) in a draft UN report on alleged illegal exploitation of resources from the Democratic Republic of the Congo. The final United Nations report (S/2003/1027), sent by Secretary-General Kofi Annan to the Security Council on 23 October 2003, dismissed these allegations in relation to several multinational companies, including American Mineral Fields.

== Personal life ==
Boulle has British nationality. He is a Mauritian citizen and lives in Monaco. He is married and has two children.

== Honours ==
In 2007, Boulle was made a Commander of the Order of the Rokel, the highest order of merit of Sierra Leone, for contributions to the economy of Sierra Leone through the establishment of a titanium and a bauxite mine after the civil war.

In 2026, Jean-Raymond Boulle was elevated to the rank of Grand Officer of the Order of the Star and Key of the Indian Ocean (G.O.S.K.). The decoration with the G.O.S.K. is Mauritius’ highest distinction and is made by the President on the advice of the Prime Minister, as is customary for the Grand Officer ranks of the Order of the Star and Key of the Indian Ocean.

== See also ==
- James P. Allison
- Trained immunity
- Mitral valve replacement
- Raphael Fishing Company
- Partridge 1885
- Mauritian Wildlife Foundation
- African Growth and Opportunity Act
- Corporate Council on Africa
