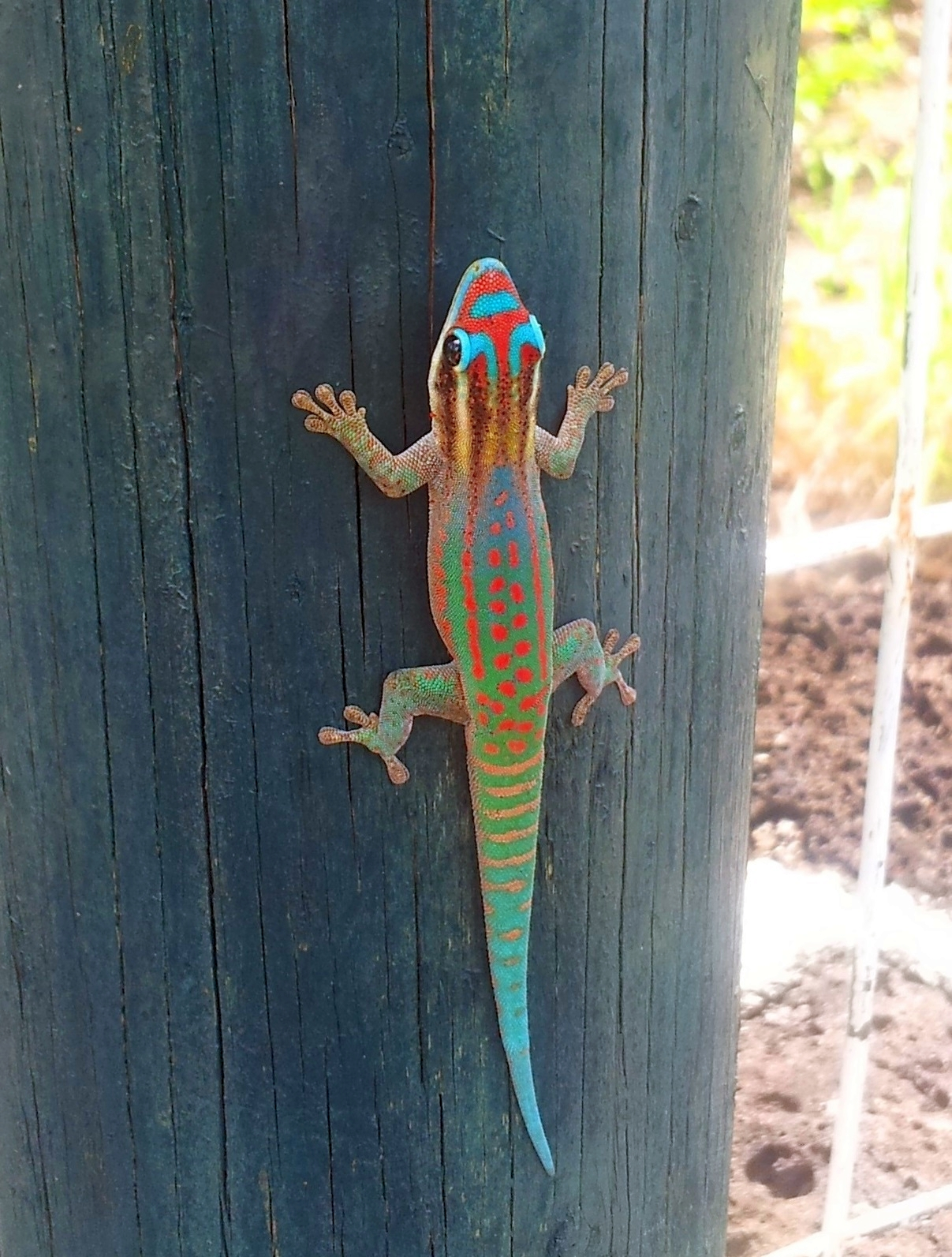
- In Bras d'Eau National Park
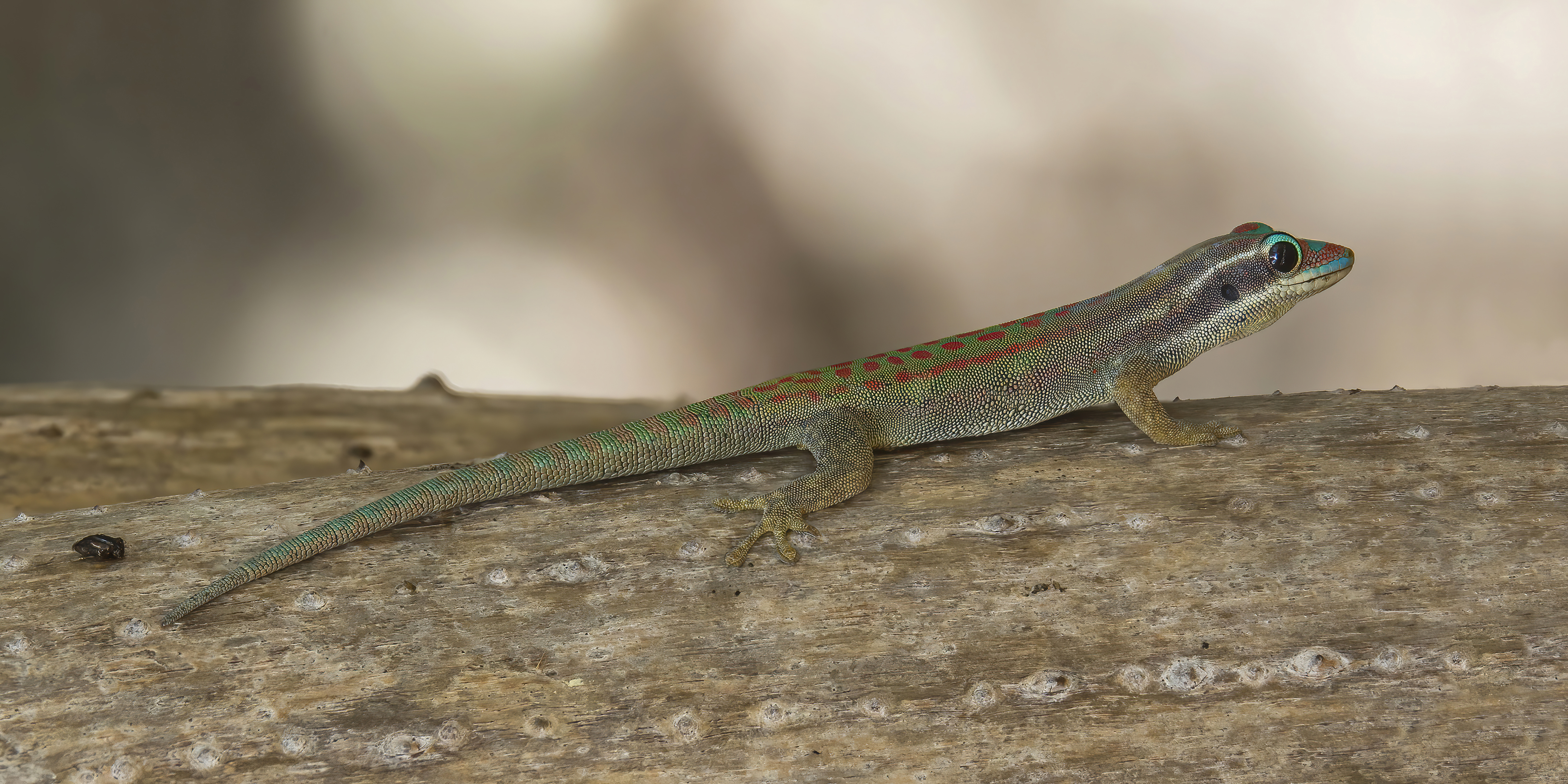
- On Île aux Aigrettes

Conservation status
- Least Concern (IUCN 3.1)

Scientific classification
- Kingdom: Animalia
- Phylum: Chordata
- Class: Reptilia
- Order: Squamata
- Suborder: Gekkota
- Family: Gekkonidae
- Genus: Phelsuma
- Species: P. ornata

Binomial name
- Phelsuma ornata J.E. Gray, 1825
- Approximate distribution Depicted: Mauritius (Round Island, Île aux Aigrettes, and Coin de Mire), South Africa Range

Synonyms
- Phelsuma ornatum Gray, 1825; Phelsuma vinsoni Mertens, 1963; Phelsuma ornata vinsoni Heselhaus, 1980; Phelsuma Phelsuma vinsoni Mertens, 1963

= Mauritius ornate day gecko =

Species of lizard

The Mauritius ornate day gecko (Phelsuma ornata) is a diurnal species in the common gecko family, Gekkonidae. It occurs on the island of Mauritius, up to an elevation of 300 metres (980 ft), and most of the surrounding islands. It typically inhabits different trees and bushes. The Mauritius ornate day gecko feeds on insects and nectar from flowering plants.

== Description ==
This gecko has a typical length of 10–13 cm (3.9–5.1 in). The back of the neck and head are greyish brown and bordered by white neck stripes. The body colour is quite variable. It can be bluish green, green with a blue area on the front back, or completely blue. The flanks are brown. The snout consists of an intricate pattern of cyan, white, red and dark blue. The back is covered with red coloured dots and the head has a T-shaped pattern. The tail is turquoise with red transverse bars. The ventral side is off-white.

== Distribution ==
This species is found on Mauritius, Round Island, Île aux Aigrettes (Île aux Aigrettes) and Coin de Mire. It is found in the coastal areas.

== Habitat ==
Phelsuma ornata typically lives in the drier areas of Mauritius at low- and mid-elevation. It can be found on trees, other pantropic vegetation or on rocks where the original vegetation has been cleared.

A resident of Flic en Flac on the west coast of Mauritius reports that their garden has been colonised by these geckos. They can be seen walking all over the garden walls and the walls of the house, and some of them venture indoors, even spending the night behind wardrobes before going outside in the morning via the open windows.

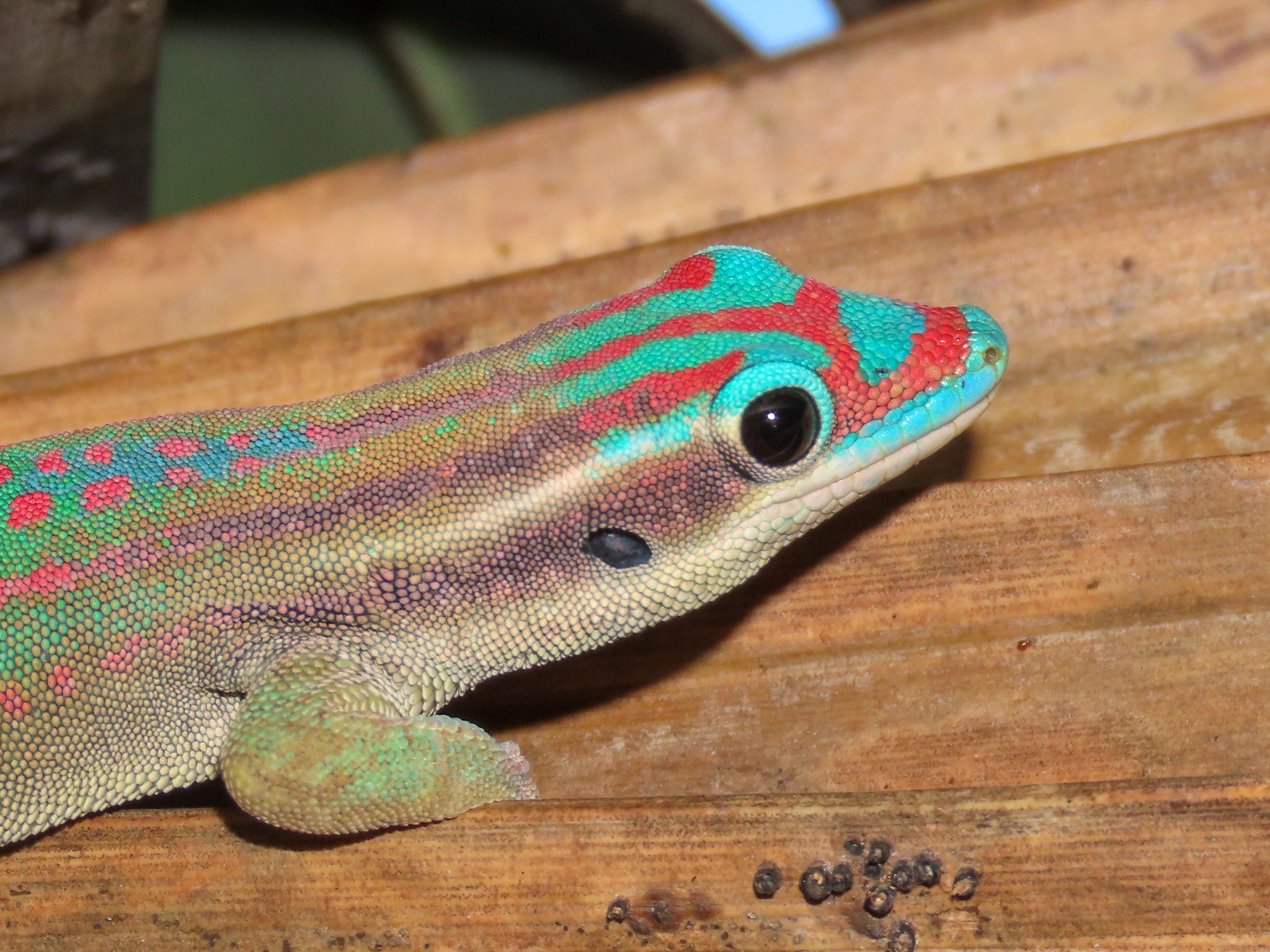

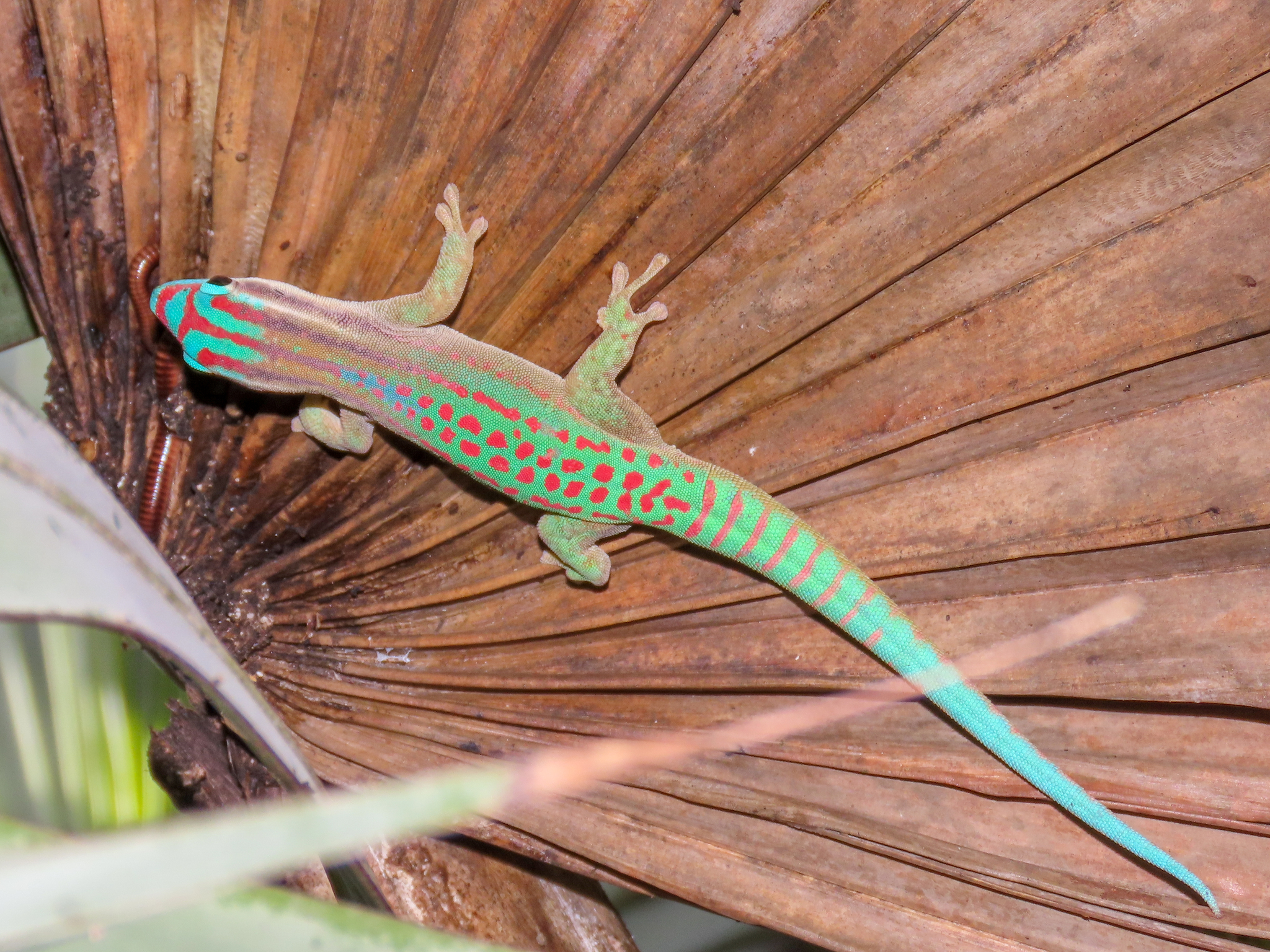

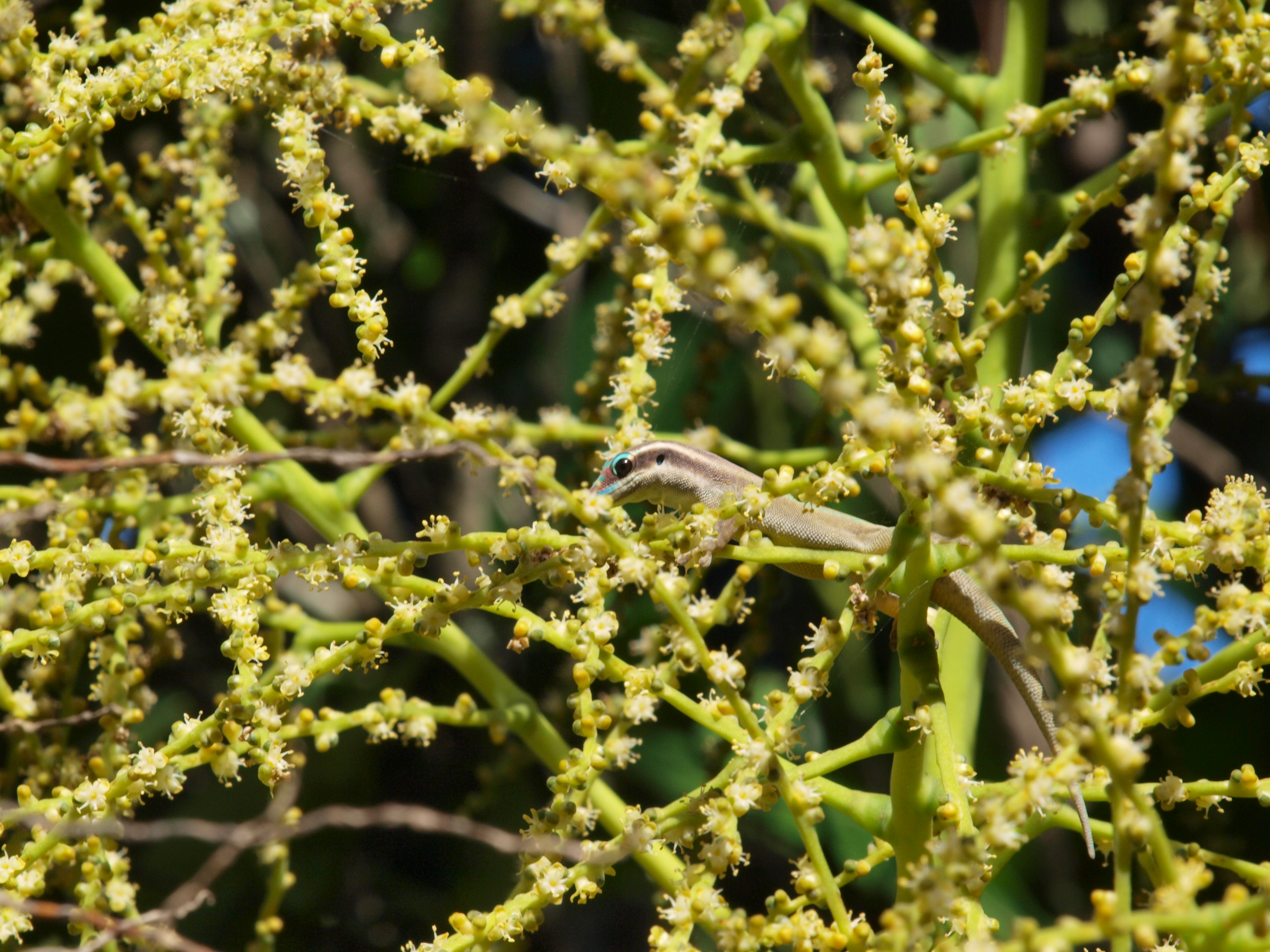
Feeding on nectar from bottle palm flowers

== Diet ==
These day geckos feed on various insects and other invertebrates. They also like to lick soft, sweet fruit, pollen and nectar.

== Behaviour ==
This Phelsuma species can be quite shy in captivity. These day geckos are also surprisingly speedy.

They seem not to be frightened by people - they stop on the wall, making eye contact, and look and listen to someone talking to them, but they appear not to be vocal, unlike the night geckos.

== Reproduction ==
At a temperature of 28 °C (82 °F), the young will hatch after approximately 40 days. The juveniles measure around 35 mm (1.4 in).

In 2014, an experiment with five Mauritius ornate day geckos was launched to space in order to test the effect of microgravity on gecko reproduction. The geckos died from a combination of factors due to a loss of communication with the satellite, including a life support malfunction which deactivated the heating system.

== Care and maintenance in captivity ==
These animals should be housed in pairs in a well planted enclosure. The temperature should be between 26 and 28 °C (79 and 82 °F) during the day and dropped to around 20 °C (68 °F) at night. The humidity should be maintained at 50–60% during the day and 80–90% at night. In captivity, these animals can be fed with crickets, wax moth larvae, fruit flies, mealworms and houseflies.
