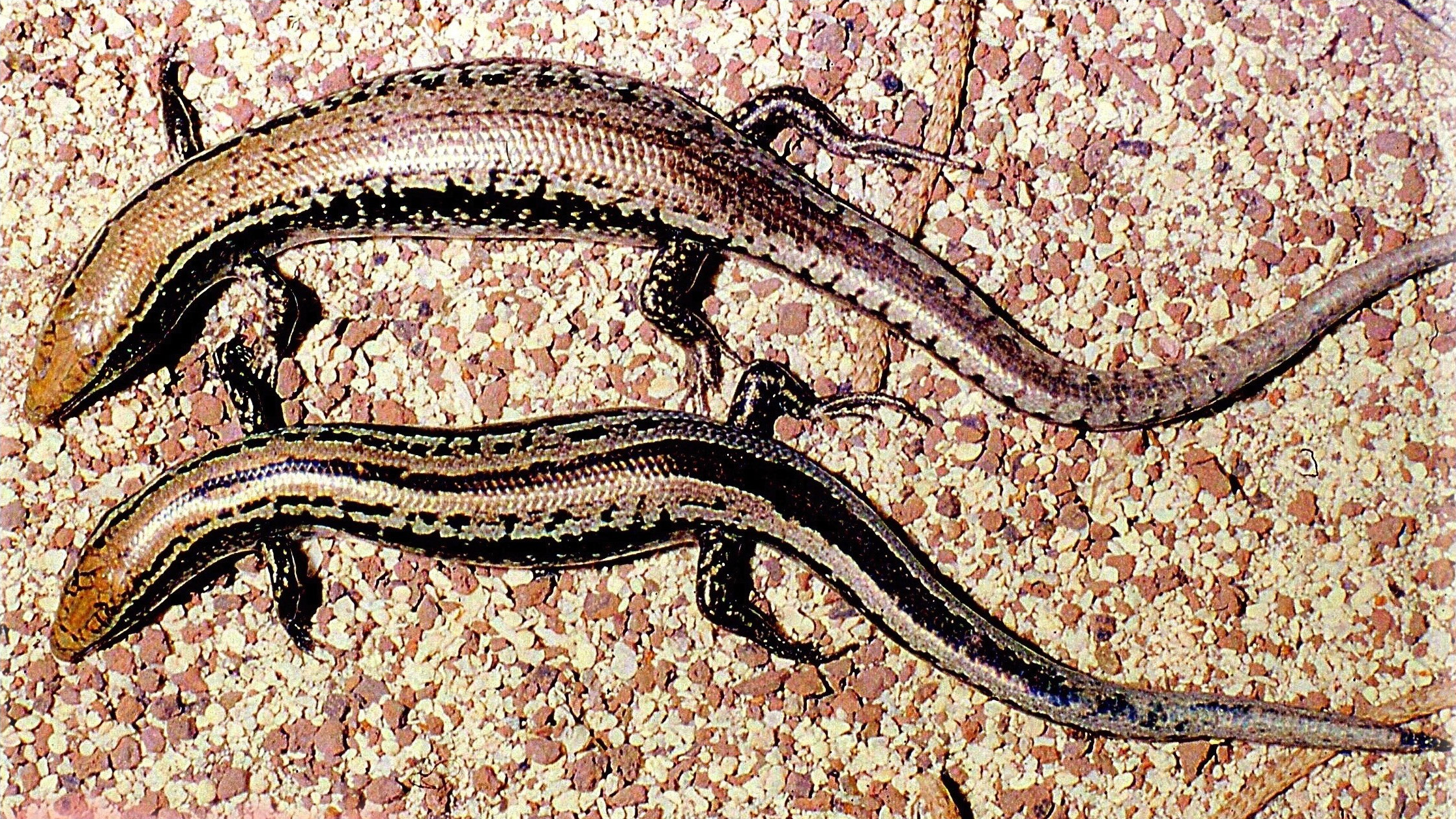

Conservation status
- Critically Endangered (IUCN 3.1)

Scientific classification
- Kingdom: Animalia
- Phylum: Chordata
- Class: Reptilia
- Order: Squamata
- Family: Scincidae
- Genus: Gongylomorphus
- Species: G. bojerii

Binomial name
- Gongylomorphus bojerii (Desjardins, 1831)
- Approximate distribution Depicted: Mauritius (Coin de Mire, Round Island, and Ile aux Fouquets), Southern Africa Range Extinct

Synonyms
- Scincus bojerii Desjardins, 1831; Gongylus bojerii — A.M.C. Duméril & Bibron, 1839; Scelotes bojeri — Boulenger, 1887; Gongylomorphus bojeri — Greer, 1970; Gongylomorphus bojerii — Brygoo, 1981

= Bojer's skink =

Species of lizard

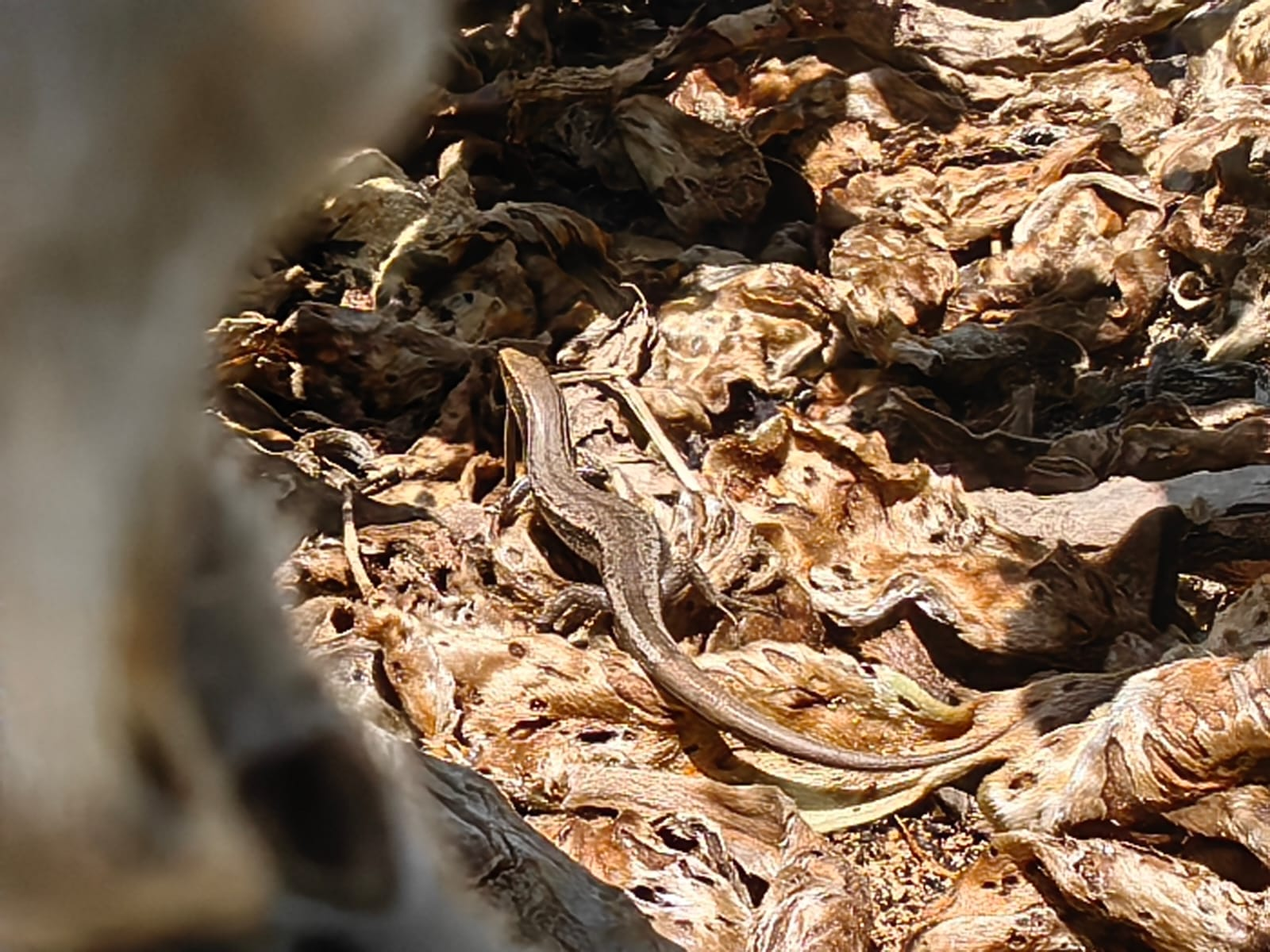
Bojer Skink

Bojer's skink (Gongylomorphus bojerii, formerly Scelotes bojeri) is a small species of skink, a lizard in the family Scincidae. The species is endemic to Mauritius including some of its offshore islands.

== Etymology ==
Both the specific name, bojerii, and the common name, Bojer's skink, are in honor of Czech naturalist Wenceslas Bojer.

== Description ==
G. bojerii is about 11 cm (4.3 in) in total length, including a 6 cm (2.4 in) tail. It has five digits on each extremity.

== Geographic range ==
Bojer's skink occurs in patches of the Black River Gorges National Park and on some off-shore islands of Mauritius, including Ilot Vacoas, Round Island, Serpent Island, Ilot Gabriel, Pigeon Rock, Flat Island, Gunner's Quoin, Ile aux Aigrettes, and Ile de la Passe.

== Habitat ==
The preferred natural habitats of G. bojerii are grassland, shrubland, and forest, at altitudes from sea level to 280 m (920 ft).

== Behavior ==
G. bojerii is diurnal and terrestrial.

== Reproduction ==
The mode of reproduction of G. bojerii is unknown.

== Threats ==
The Asian house shrew (Suncus murinus) has aided in the decline of G. bojerii. Thanks to the efforts of the Mauritian Wildlife Foundation, this invasive species of mammal was eradicated from the habitat of Bojer's skink. Also, captive breeding and reintroduction efforts at the Gerald Durrell Endemic Wildlife Sanctuary have helped to increase the population of G. bojerii.
