= Adastra Minerals =

England-based mining company

Adastra Minerals Inc
- Formerly: America Mineral Fields Inc
- Industry: Mining
- Founded: 1995; 31 years ago
- Founder: Mike McMurrough; Jean-Raymond Boulle
- Headquarters: London, England, United Kingdom
- Owners: Jean-Raymond Boulle (10%); Prudential plc (14%)

Adastra Minerals Inc (formerly America Mineral Fields Inc) was a London-based mining company with notable operations in central Africa (Angola, Democratic Republic of Congo, and Zambia), particularly in copper, cobalt and zinc exploration. Adastra's properties and concessions were acquired in 2006 by First Quantum Minerals for $245m in cash and stock, outpacing a counter-offer by Mwana Africa plc. Founder Jean-Raymond Boulle and top UK insurer Prudential plc had owned 10% and 14% stakes in Adastra, respectively. In the mid-1990s, the company became known for developing highly prospective copper and cobalt mines in Zaire during a civil war.

== History ==
=== American Mineral Fields ===
American Mineral Fields (AMF) was founded in 1995 to "develop diamond interests" in Brazil by Mike McMurrough and Jean-Raymond Boulle. American Mineral Fields was based in Hope, Arkansas and operated from Canada. It was the "brainchild" of Boulle, a former executive at De Beers Diamonds in South Africa. It was chaired by McMurrough, described as a personal friend of Bill Clinton.

Early on, it operated as a penny-stock company listed in Vancouver on the Vancouver and Toronto stock exchanges, but "lacked sufficient capital to develop mines on its own." In 1996, when it was listed on the Toronto Stock Exchange for the first time, The Robertson Stephens Orphan Fund was among its largest shareholders.

=== Adastra Minerals ===
Adastra Minerals in 2004 contracted a "definitive feasibility study" on the DRC Kolwezi cobalt/copper tailings project to a joint venture of Murray & Roberts and GRD Minproc. It was still being finalized in the middle of 2005.

In 2004, Adastra Minerals rejected a buyout offer by First Quantum. In 2005, the World Bank subsidiary The International Finance Corporation was considering taking a ten percent stake in a project owned by Adastra Minerals. Adastra had formerly been known as American Mineral Fields.

Also in 2005, Adastra Minerals was still involved in copper and cobalt, and its "$300m Kolwezi cobalt and copper tailings deposit in Democratic Republic of Congo is attracting a high level of interest from South African financiers." At that point, Adastra's Kolwezi project had secured a 7.5% ownership stake from the International Finance Corporation, and 10% owned by Industrial Development Corporation in South Africa.

In January 2006, First Quantum Minerals in Canada made a hostile bid to acquire Adastra Minerals, with the bid rejected for being too low. In late April 2006, a second bid was put forward by Mwana Africa, with that bid rejected as well. By 2006, the company was owner of the Kolwezi project as the as a "Kipushi copper and zinc mine." The Kolwezi mine at the time as the "world's largest cobalt and copper surface resource," in the form of waste material from a former mine. It was expected to "produce 5,500 tonnes per year of cobalt and 30,000 tonnes of copper."

After agreeing to a revised bid, in May 2006, First Quantum Minerals acquired Adastra Minerals "in a cash-and-shares deal worth about C$275 million (£135 million)." First Quantum said it would like Adastra on the London Stock Exchange. At the time, Adastra was based in London, England and developing mineral assets in Central Africa, particularly mining operations in Zambia, Mauritania and Congo. After the acquisition, First Quantum again had gained control of the Kolwezi mine, committing to invest a new $600 million in the project.

== Notable personnel ==
- Jean-Raymond Boulle, founder; owned 10% stake at time of acquisition by First Quantum.
- Former United States President George H. W. Bush was until 2006 named a member of the international advisory board.
