= Réunion kestrel =

Conservation status
- Extinct (c.1700) (IUCN 3.1)

Scientific classification
- Kingdom: Animalia
- Phylum: Chordata
- Class: Aves
- Order: Falconiformes
- Family: Falconidae
- Genus: Falco
- Species: †F. duboisi

Binomial name
- †Falco duboisi Cowles, 1994

Extinct species of bird

The Réunion kestrel (Falco duboisi) is an extinct bird of prey which belongs to the falcon family. It was endemic to the Mascarene island of Réunion and was part of the Western Indian Ocean radiation of kestrels.

== Description ==
Known from subfossil bones and the writings of Dubois published in 1674, this bird was larger than its relative F. punctatus on Mauritius, being about the size of a common kestrel, or around 35 cm from head to tail, with males being noticeably smaller than females. This trait, while present in most birds of prey, is most pronounced in the larger, bird-eating species and reduces between-sex competition by niche differentiation. It can be assumed that the bird was of the same generally brownish coloration as its closest relatives, with a lighter underside and darker spots or stipples, the tail, brown or more probably grey, being banded and tipped black. Its feet were yellow and large relative to the bird's overall size. The wingspan was 60–70 cm, its wings being more rounded than those of the common kestrel - just as in the Mauritius bird - for increased maneuverability when hunting in the forest. It is probable, but not certain, that the only difference between the sexes was their size.

== Diet ==
The bird fed mainly on birds, but certainly also on insects and the Reunion Island day gecko (Phelsuma borbonica). Dubois noted that despite their small size they were able to prey on domestic chickens.

== Extinction ==
Dubois mentioned three kinds of birds of prey extant on Réunion in the early 1670s: in order of decreasing size, papangues (the Malagasy harrier, Circus macrosceles, which still exists), pieds jaunes ("yellow-feet") and émerillons (a term for small falcons like the merlin, Falco columbarius). It is not quite clear what name refers to the Réunion kestrel. From reviewing the evidence, the bird was most probably the émerillon, with the pieds jaunes being either migrant falcons (the only species that might occur in the area, the sooty falcon (Falco concolor), Eleonora's falcon (F. eleonorae) and the peregrine falcon (F. peregrinus), are larger than F. duboisi was, if not in overall length, then at least in wingspan) or the juveniles of the marsh harrier, which are distinctly colored and also have yellow feet. The latter explanation seems more likely as the name was unequivocally applied to young marsh harriers in the late 19th century. Nonetheless, it seems remotely possible that the Réunion falcon's sexes were not only of different size, but also differently colored. In this case, the males would be the émerillons and the females the pieds jaunes.

This seems not likely, however, as Jean Feuilley in 1705 only mentions papangues and pieds jaunes as extant. The extinction of the Réunion kestrel, which thus seems to have been around 1700, is something of a mystery, just as that of the Réunion scops owl (Otus grucheti). Introduced predators were not present in numbers at that time and even rats probably would not have presented much of a problem for the birds. Certainly, they were considered a pest as they fed on poultry, but hunting is unlikely to have been able to reduce their population much at such an early time, as evidenced by the continuous survival of the marsh harrier, which was heavily persecuted for centuries for the same reason.
