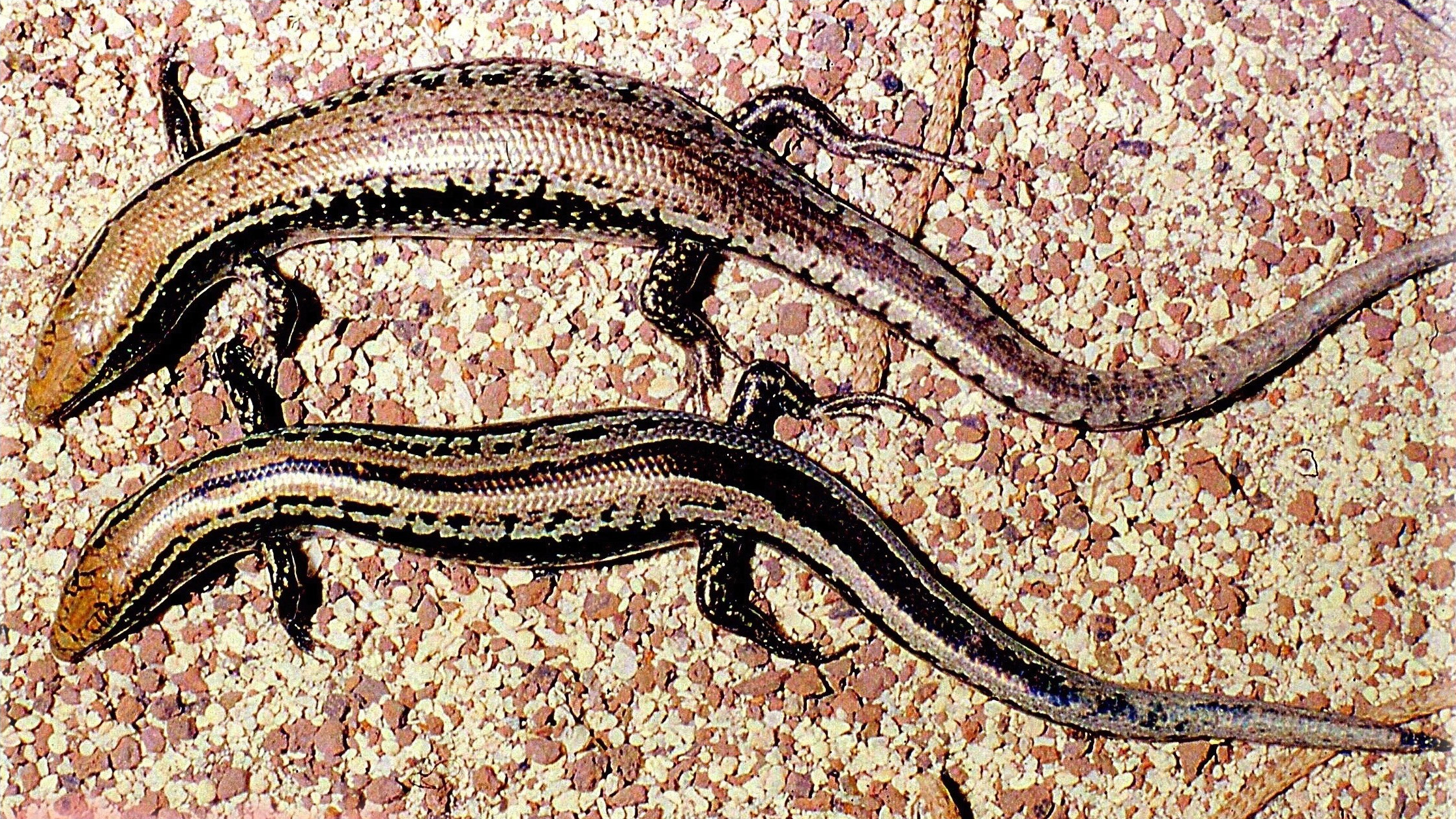
- Bojer's skink

Scientific classification
- Kingdom: Animalia
- Phylum: Chordata
- Class: Reptilia
- Order: Squamata
- Suborder: Scinciformata
- Infraorder: Scincomorpha
- Family: Scincidae
- Genus: Gongylomorphus; Fitzinger, 1834

= Gongylomorphus =

Genus of lizards

Gongylomorphus is a genus of skinks found in Mauritius. It is represented by only two surviving species.

== Species ==
There are three species:

- Gongylomorphus bojerii (Desjardins, 1831) – Bojer's skink
- Gongylomorphus borbonicus (Vinson, 1969)
- Gongylomorphus fontenayi (Vinson, 1973)
