= Sierra Rutile Limited =

African mining company

- Formerly: Titanium Resources Group Ltd ( –2011)
- Industry: Mining
- Founded: 1971; 55 years ago
- Founder: Nord Resources and Armco Steel
- Headquarters: Freetown, Sierra Leone
- Area served: Sierra Leone
- Key people: Rob Hattingh (CEO)
- Products: Rutile, ilmenite, zircon
- Number of employees: >2,000 (2018)
- Parent: Iluka Resources
- Website: sierra-rutile.com
- Footnotes / references Number of employees; Parent

Sierra Rutile Limited (Titanium Resources Group Ltd. until 2011) is a mining company with headquarters based in Freetown, Sierra Leone. The company currently has operating mines for Rutile, ilmenite, zircon, and titanium dioxide minerals in South and Northwest Sierra Leone, specifically in the Moyamba and Bonthe Districts. Australian-based Iluka Resources Limited acquired the company in December 2016 and subsequently installed new and currently acting CEO Rob Hattingh.

== History ==
Titanium Resources Group Ltd.
- Company type: Limited
- Industry: Mining
- Headquarters: London & Freetown
- Key people: John Sisay, Chief Executive Officer; Jean Lindberg Charles, Chief Financial Officer; Wayne Malouf, Non-Executive Chairman; Mark Button, Chief Operating Officer; Neil Gawthorpe, Marketing Director
- Products: Rutile; Ilmenite; Zircon
- Website: www.titaniumresources.com

Sierra Rutile Limited was officially founded in December 1971 by Nord Resources and Armco Steel. However, mining operations began in the area in 1967, which is recognized by some as the inception of the firm. In 1993, the company had the highest rutile (a titanium mineral) production in the world; however, this milestone was short-lived as the Sierra Leonean Civil War disrupted mining progress.

- In 1995 the company abandoned their operation because of the Sierra Leone Civil War.
- In January 2005, the company agreed a mining lease covering 580 km² of South West Sierra Leone, about 150 km South East of the capital.
- On 28 February 2005, the company announced that they were beginning refurbishment of the Sierra Rutile Mine, to be completed in early 2006. Later in the year, they announced that they were to restart their SML Bauxite mine also. In December 2005 they acquired the Rotifunk mineral sands prospect, also in Sierra Leone, from Gondwana Investments S.A. for US$120000. In January 2006, they completed refurbishment and commissioned their primary bucket line dredge (Dredge D1), and so restarted the SML Bauxite Project.
- On 25 August 2005, they listed shares on the AIM market of the London Stock Exchange under the symbol: AIM: TXR.L.
- In December 2007 a second Dredge D2 commenced production at the company's Sierra Rutile Mine, increasing capacity to 200,000 tonnes per year. Dredge D2 was a complete unit comprising a bucket ladder dredge and heavy mineral separation plant mounted on a single pontoon.
- During July 2008 the company announced the disposal of Global Aluminium Limited to Vimetco N.V., a group owned by Vitaliy L. Machitski, for a total cash consideration of US$40 million. Global Aluminium Limited, a wholly owned subsidiary of the company, owns 100% of Sierra Mineral Holdings 1, Ltd, the operating company for the company's SML bauxite mine in Sierra Leone.
- On 25 July 2008 trading in the company's shares was suspended on AIM market of the London Stock Exchange after it was announced Dredge D2 had capsized resulting in the loss of two lives. The company had insurance, but it took until 2010 for a resolution with the company's insurers to be agreed when a total of $11m was recovered. Initial estimates believed Dredge D2 could be operational by December 2009 some 14 months of the accident, this was later increased to $35m and 2 years.
- In January 2009 trading in the companies shares recommenced on AIM market of the London Stock Exchange.

=== Placing ===
16 November 2009 the company raised $25m via a placing of 151,200,000 new shares at 10 pence. The proceeds of which will fund the three projects Dredge D3, upgrade D1 wet processing plant and upgrading the company's land plant. The upgrade to D1 would cost $2 million and increase rutile recovery by 5,000 tonnes and Ilmenite recovery by 1,000 tonnes per annum.

=== Dredge D3 ===
The third dredge would cost $20m adding 30,000 tonnes to annual capacity. Production was due to start in Q1 2010 and take 12 months to complete, the company later took some time to review this ambitious production schedule to redesign the dredge in order to reduce the build cost and increase its operating efficiencies.

=== Pala Investment Holding Limited ===
In September 2010 it was announced that Pala took a 29.8% holding in TXR after acquiring the majority of the Ordinary Shares held by Mr Jean-Raymond Boulle - the previous majority share holder.

Pala is a US$1 billion multi-strategy investment company with a particular focus on mining and natural resource companies in both developed and emerging markets. Pala's exclusive investment advisor, Pala Investments AG, is a Swiss-based team with extensive experience within the mining and natural resource sectors. Pala seeks to assist companies in which it has long-term shareholdings by providing strategic advice and innovative financing solutions.

=== Government of Sierra Leone ===
During the second half of 2010 a dispute arose between the Government of Sierra Leone and Sierra Rutile Limited over the non payment of certain interest payments regarding a loan from the government. A resolution to the dispute was agreed in December 2010 when the government withdrew its request for the payment by Sierra Rutile Limited of all accrued interest plus the accrued balance and capital interest owing. Further, the government acknowledged that no event of default or potential event of default is outstanding, and that it has no claims regarding any prior events of default which may have occurred.

=== After the name change ===
The company was previously known as Titanium Resources Group Ltd until name, web address and trading symbol changes in February 2011.

On December 7, 2016, the company was acquired by Iluka Resources Limited for A$375 million (Note: US$287 million). Iluka incurred the company's outstanding net debt of A$80million. Iluka has headquarters in Australia, but also operates in Sierra Leone and Sri Lanka.

== Operations ==
=== Overall Process ===
The relevant materials minerals are mined, albeit in different ways. After the company extracts them, they are processed in a mineral separation plant. Once separated, a truck takes the minerals to the Nitti port to be shipped.

==== Gangama Dry Mine ====
Starting in April 2015, the Gangama dry mine was built by the Sierra Rutile company and DRA Projects. On June 2, 2016, the Gangama Dry Mine was declared ready for action. It was predicted to mine up to 500 tonnes of ore per hour; Iluka is considering expanding the mine capacity by an extra 500 tonnes of ore per hour.

==== Lanti Dry Mine ====
Completed in 2013, the Lanti Dry Mine collected up to 500 tonnes of ore per hour in 2016, with Iluka considering expanding the mine capacity by an extra 500 tonnes of ore per hour.

==== Lanti Dredge Mine ====
In 2016, the Lanti Dredge Mine could collect up to 750 tonnes of ore per hour, and later 1,000 tonnes of ore each hour.

==== Sembehun Mine (Potential) ====
Sierra Rutile is currently exploring mining in Sembehun. The company has already developed the appropriate plans and assessed the area as required by creating its Environmental, Social and Health Management Plan (ESHMP) and an Environmental, Social and Health Impact Assessment (ESHIA). It has similarly received approval from Sierra Leone's Environmental Protection Agency and received an Environmental Impact Assessment License.

== Controversy ==
=== Strike ===
On October 23, 2018, the Australian Mining newspaper reported that miners at the Sierra Rutile Company went on strike because four union leaders were suspended after a previous strike. Because of the strike's impact on rutile production, on November 27, 2018, the newly elected president, Julius Maada Bio, got involved by asking workers to halt the strike. The Sierra Leonean has since conceded that it will not punish the workers who participated in the strike. Iluka Resources Limited, Sierra Rutile Limited's parent company, reported on November 28 that rutile production for the year would be negatively affected.

=== Bribery Scandal ===
In 2017, a former presidential candidate and the former CEO of Sierra Rutile, John Sisay, a cousin of former President Ernest Bai Koroma, was suspected of bribing high-ranking Sierra Leonean government employees to acquire mining contracts. These bribes seem to have come in the form of plane tickets, like that for Diana Konomanyi, who was a cabinet minister in the Sierra Leonean government at the time.

== Sustainability Practices ==
=== Mission ===
"We aim to deliver maximum long-term shareholder value through the sustainable and efficient operation of the world-class Sierra Rutile mine."

=== Governance ===
Iluka has aimed at a culture of strong ethics and conduct by encouraging transparency. At the Sierra Rutile Company, this has come in the form of Sierra Leone taxes paid being included in the Iluka's general disclosure reporting.

=== Economic Responsibility ===
The company looks to add to the domestic Sierra Leonean economy by creating more job opportunities, investing in local infrastructure and services, supporting local businesses, and by supporting the community. Iluka has contributed to the Ruby Rose Educational and Recreational Centre in Sierra Leone. Sierra Rutile has created a committee to oversee fund allocation towards community related events. This Community Development Committee (CDC) plans to allocate most funds towards education and CDC related plans.

In 2017, Sierra Rutile constructed a 60-meter footbridge between Higima and Nyandehun villages in the Imperi Chiefdom to help people move more safely across the two areas. The bridge is located above Lanti Dredge pond's passage for surplus water (spillway).

=== People ===
As of the merger in 2016, the company had approximately 1,600 employees, more than 95% of whom are Sierra Leonean. In 2017, the company added 360 new employees to make a total of 1,985 employees (95% Sierra Leonean). 93% of the employees are male and 7% are female. In 2017, Sierra Rutile required the entire workforce to complete the new general induction program, which emphasized maintaining safe practices while on the job.

=== Health And Safety ===
In 2017, the company increased the number of hazard reporting numbers at the mine from 34 per month in the second quarter of 2017 to 342 per month in the fourth quarter of 2017. Iluka mandated that Sierra Rutile focus on identifying risks and preventing them to ultimately create a fatality free workplace. As a result, workers are required to wear safety boots, shirts, and pants; take a daily alcohol test; and review the action plans for higher-risk activities.

At the end of 2017, there were 45 recorded serious potential injuries (SPIs) at the Sierra Rutile workplace.

=== Social Performance ===
The Iluka group defines social performance as maintaining good health and safety practices, communicating and receiving feedback from investors, and promoting human rights related values where necessary. Iluka has committed to maintaining indigenous cultures in Sierra Leone and as such are required to draft Cultural Heritage Management Plans to ensure that the rights of indigenous peoples are not violated.

=== Environment ===
Because Iluka operates in multiple biodiverse locations, it looks to:

- Have experts conduct survey assessments of relevant plants and animals
- Evaluate how local bodies of water affect the ecosystem

The Sierra Rutile company hired a geotechnical specialist consultant to conduct quarterly inspections.
