= Gerald Durrell Endemic Wildlife Sanctuary =

Animal sanctuary in Mauritius

- IUCN category IV (habitat/species management area)
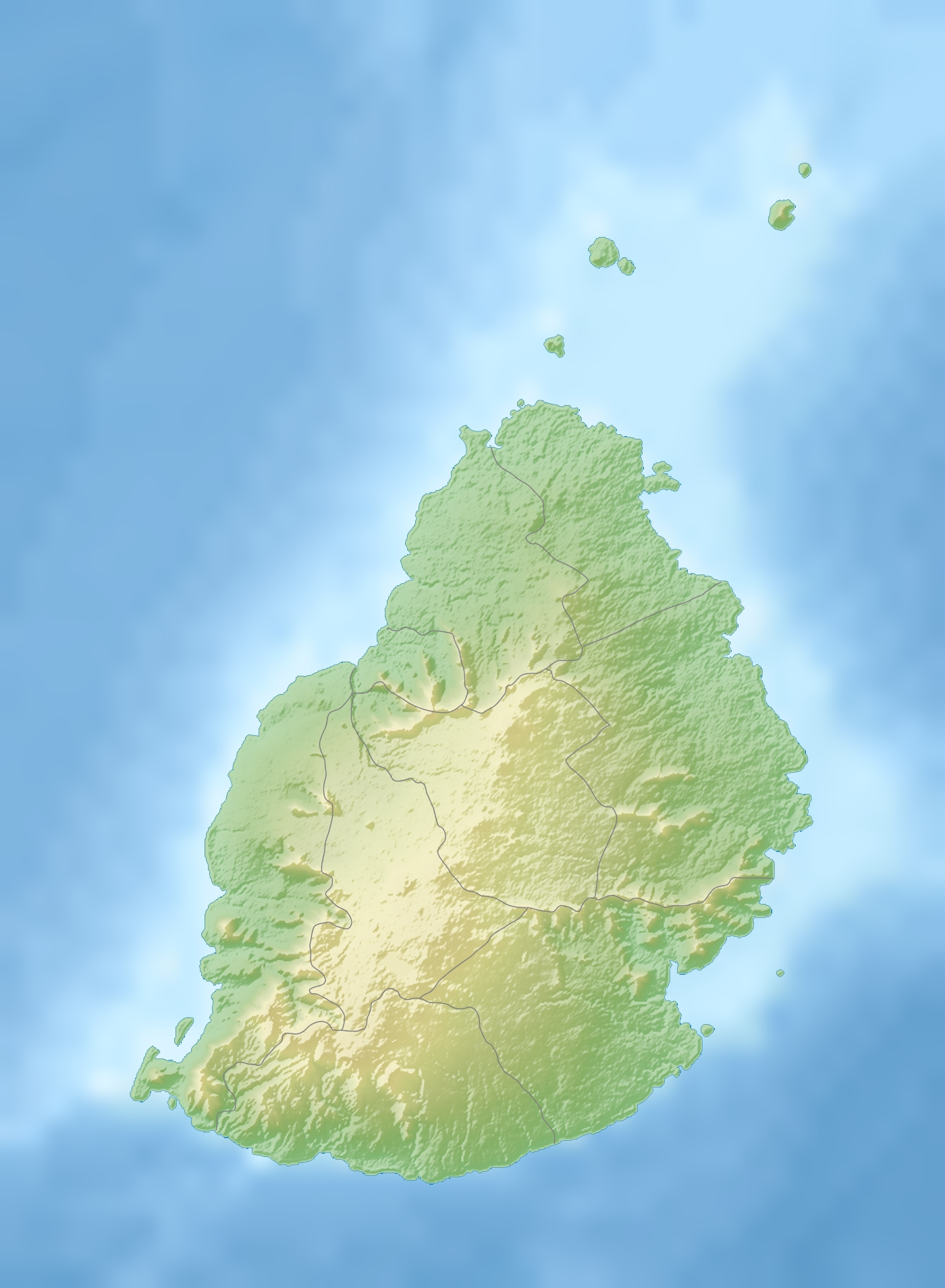
- Location within Mauritius
- Location: Black River District, Mauritius
- Nearest city: Tamarin
- Coordinates: 20°25′S 57°20′E
- Area: NA
- Established: 1984
- Visitors: Visitors not allowed except with rangers (in 2005)
- Governing body: Mauritian Wildlife Foundation

The Gerald Durrell Endemic Wildlife Sanctuary, also known as GDEWS, is an animal sanctuary founded in 1984, in Western Mauritius. It is an area closed off to the public, in the Black River Gorge region, which is densely forested, and is used for breeding rare, endemic Mauritian species. Among the endangered species in the sanctuary is the Mauritius kestrel, once the rarest bird in the world with only 4 members left. It has been successfully bred and the population has now reached the capacity of Mauritius.

The sanctuary is named after naturalist Gerald Durrell, who was associated with Mauritius' conservation movement from its inception in the 1970s, and who adopted the extinct Mauritian dodo as the logo for his Jersey Wildlife Preservation Trust, now Durrell Wildlife Conservation Trust.

The sanctuary is run jointly by the National Parks and Conservation Service and Mauritian Wildlife Foundation, with the help of the Durrell Wildlife Conservation Trust.

The sanctuary has contributed to the recovery of the population of the pink pigeon, by hosting birds for captive breeding.
