= Jean Feuilley =

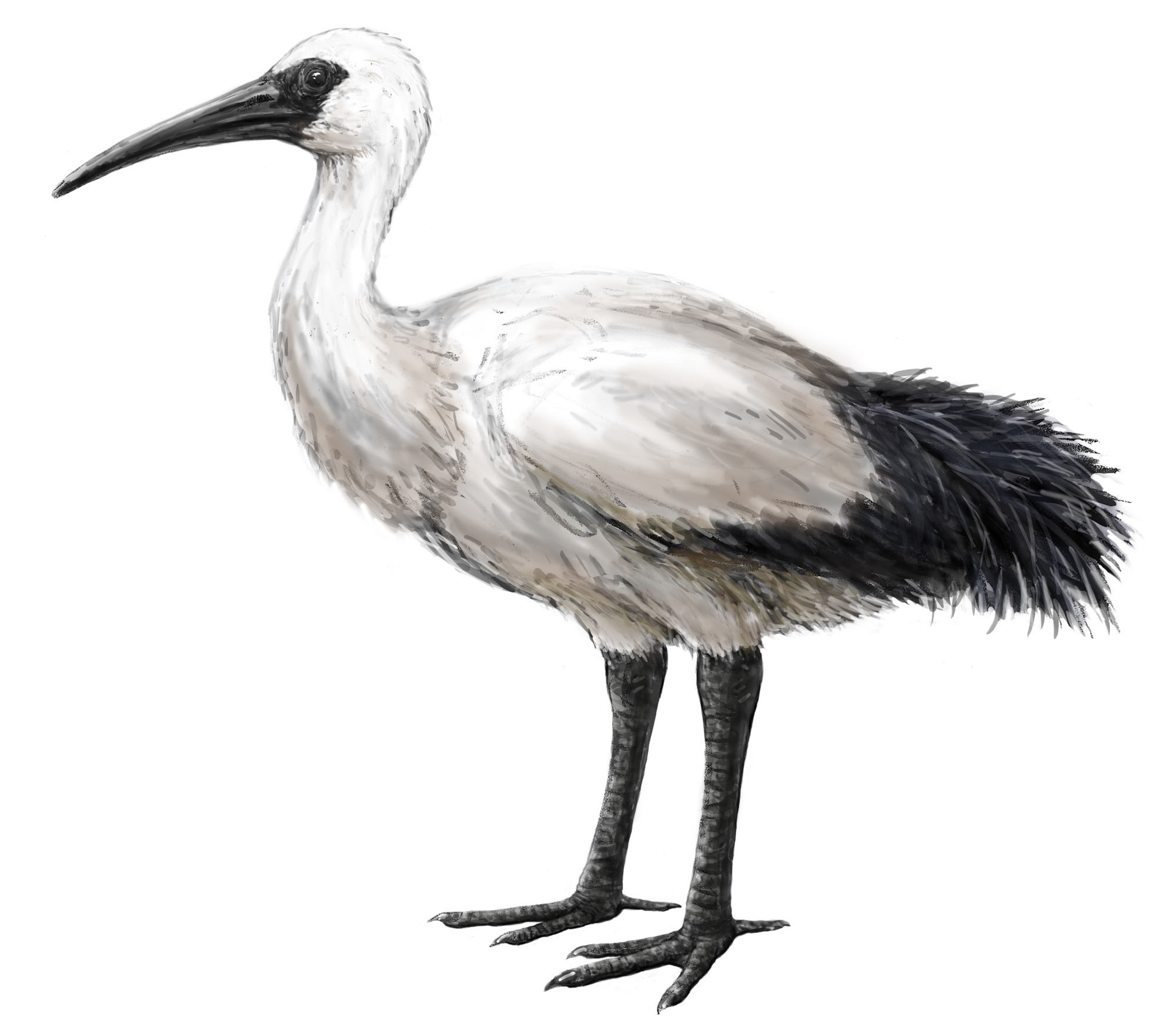
- Réunion Ibis (Threskiornis solitarius). Based on fossil elements, recent restorations by Julian Hume and Jean-Michel Probst, 17th century written accounts by Dubois, Carré, Feuilley, Tatton, and Melet, as well as extant relatives in the same genus. Per Cheke, A. S.; Hume, J. P. (2008). Lost Land of the Dodo: An Ecological History of Mauritius, Réunion & Rodrigues.
- Engineering career
- Discipline: Pilot engineering
- Projects: Mission à l’île Bourbon du sieur Feuilley en 1704

Jean Feuilley was a pilot engineer and cartographer who was sent to Réunion by the French East India Company to investigate the possibility of agricultural and marine exploitation. He arrived in the island in 1704 and the following year returned to France. His "Mission à l’île Bourbon du sieur Feuilley en 1704" (published 1705) contains among other things descriptions of now-extinct bird species, like the Réunion kestrel and the Réunion ibis.
