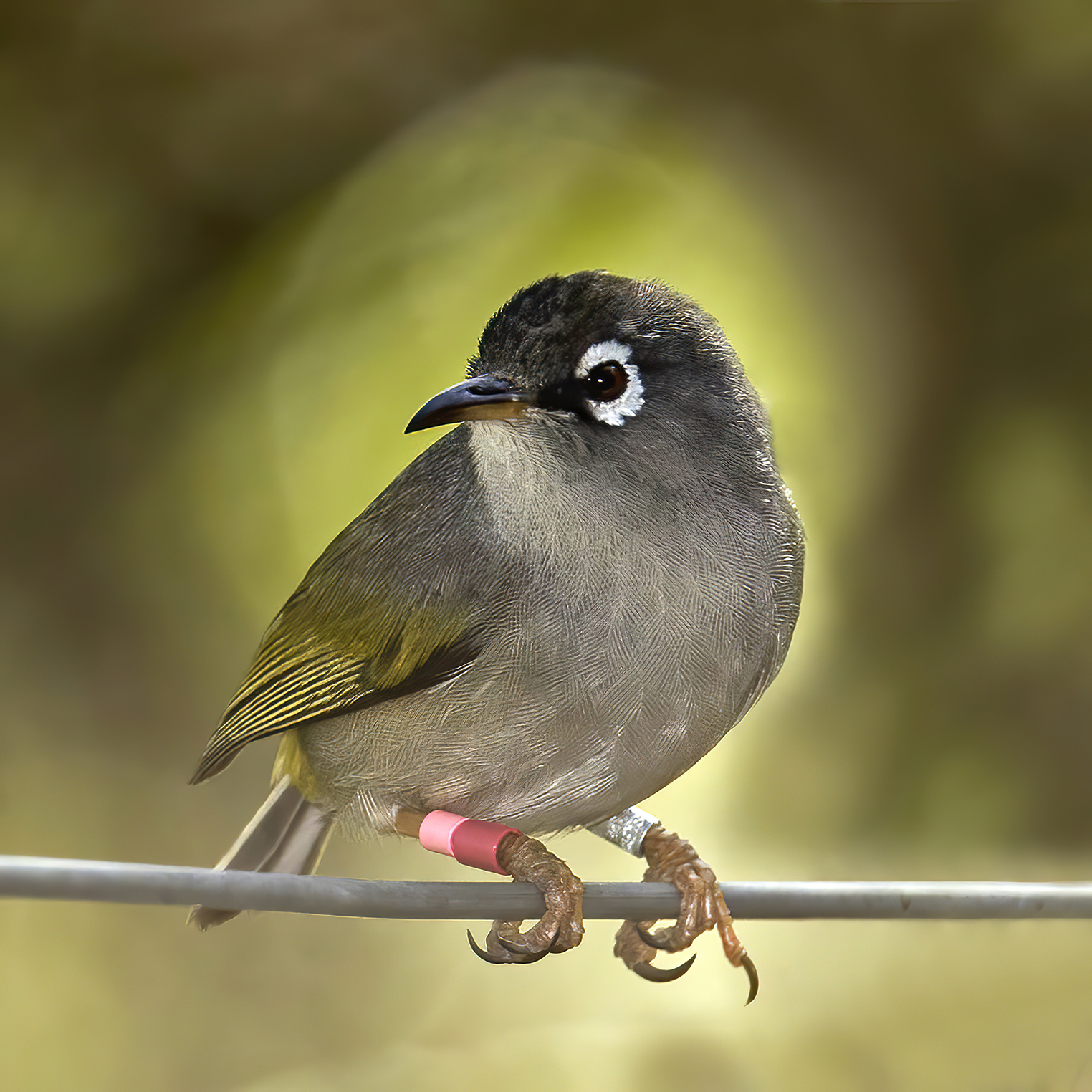
- On Île aux Aigrettes

Conservation status
- Critically Endangered (IUCN 3.1)

Scientific classification
- Kingdom: Animalia
- Phylum: Chordata
- Class: Aves
- Order: Passeriformes
- Family: Zosteropidae
- Genus: Zosterops
- Species: Z. chloronothos

Binomial name
- Zosterops chloronothos (Vieillot, 1817)
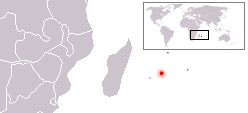
- Range highlighted in red

Synonyms
- Zosterops chloronothus Zosterops olivacea chloronothos

= Mauritius olive white-eye =

Species of bird

The Mauritius olive white-eye (Zosterops chloronothos, often mistakenly spelled Zosterops chloronothus) is a very rare and localized passerine from the family of white-eyes (Zosteropidae). It is one of two white-eye species endemic to the island of Mauritius, the other being the Mauritius grey white-eye.

== Description ==
This species was first described in 1817 by French ornithologist Louis Pierre Vieillot as Zosterops chloronothos. It can reach a size of about 10 cm (3.9 in). The upperparts are a dull olive-green, the underparts a paler color. The belly and vent have a yellow hue and the eyes are surrounded by a conspicuous white ring. The males and females are similarly coloured. The habitat of the Mauritius olive white-eye is the evergreen bushes and forests in the area of the Black River Gorges National Park, the Macchabée-Bel Ombre Biosphere Reserve and, following re-introduction, on Île aux Aigrettes. Its diet consists of nectar and insects.

During the breeding period, between September and March, two pale eggs are laid in a cup-shaped nest, which is well-hidden in the foliage. Males and females share brooding tasks. Normally only one juvenile is reared, which becomes fully fledged in about 14 days.

== Threats ==
The Mauritius olive white-eye is one of the rarest birds on Mauritius. Difficult to observe, the birds inhabit an area of only 25 km^{2} (9.7 sq mi). The main threats are introduced rats and crab-eating macaques, which destroy the nests. In only 27 years the population declined dramatically from 350 pairs in 1975 to only 120 pairs in 2002. Another reason for its rarity is that the Mauritius olive white-eye has evolved around the nectar of several endemic flowers from Mauritius. The introduction of other plant species has led to a decline in the required flowers and hence to severely decreasing numbers of the birds. Currently there is a monitoring by the Mauritian Wildlife Foundation (MWF) for every found nest.

== Conservation efforts ==
There are a few organizations that have been working on the protection of the Mauritius olive white-eye but the MWF has had the most impact. From 2005 to 2009, they've collected nests all around Mauritius for two major reasons. First, so the eggs wouldn't be eaten, and secondly, so that when they grow, they can be released on predator-free islands. To achieve that outcome, when the egg hatches, the chick immediately needs to follow a restricted diet that consists of eating a small portion of nutrients every forty minutes. After that, the chicks are put in small cages where they learn how to drink for themselves, to adapt to the food they will be eating soon enough and then teach them how to fly. When the birds have finally adapted to that, they are freed on a predator-free island, the Ile aux Aigrettes, where they have started to reproduce.

== Gallery ==
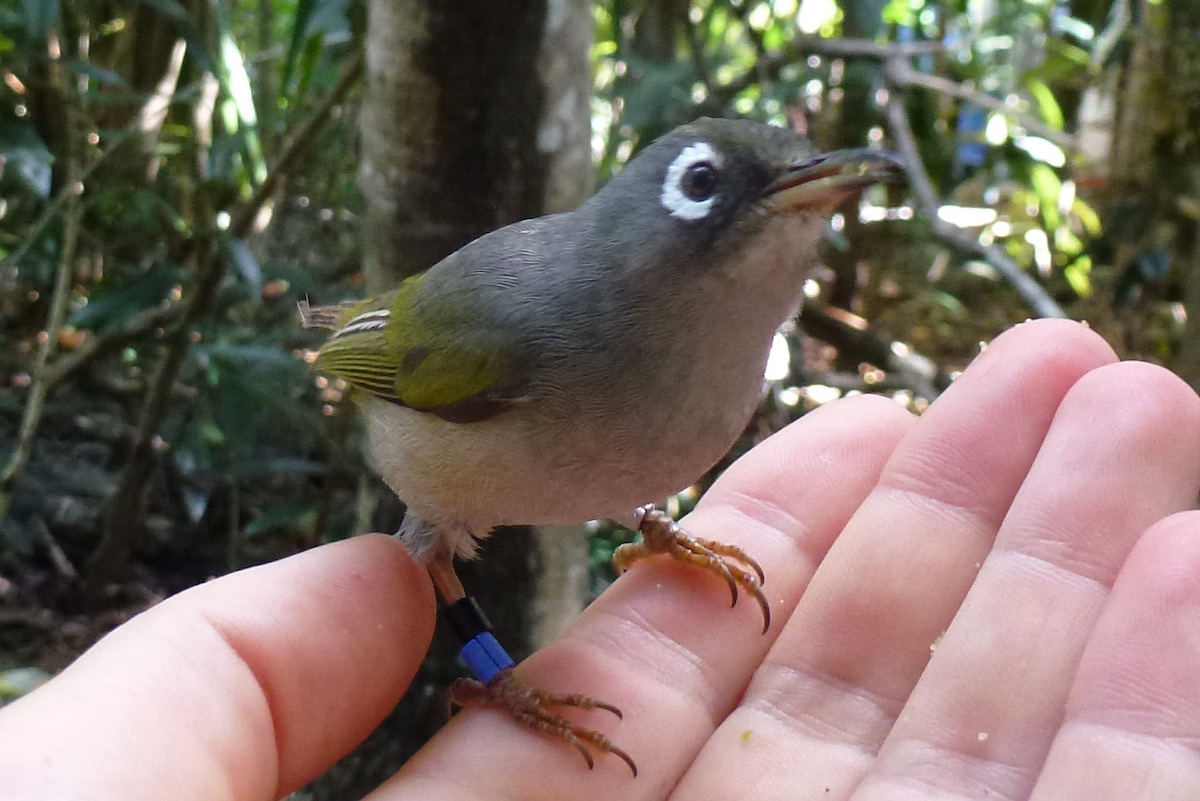
Male on hand

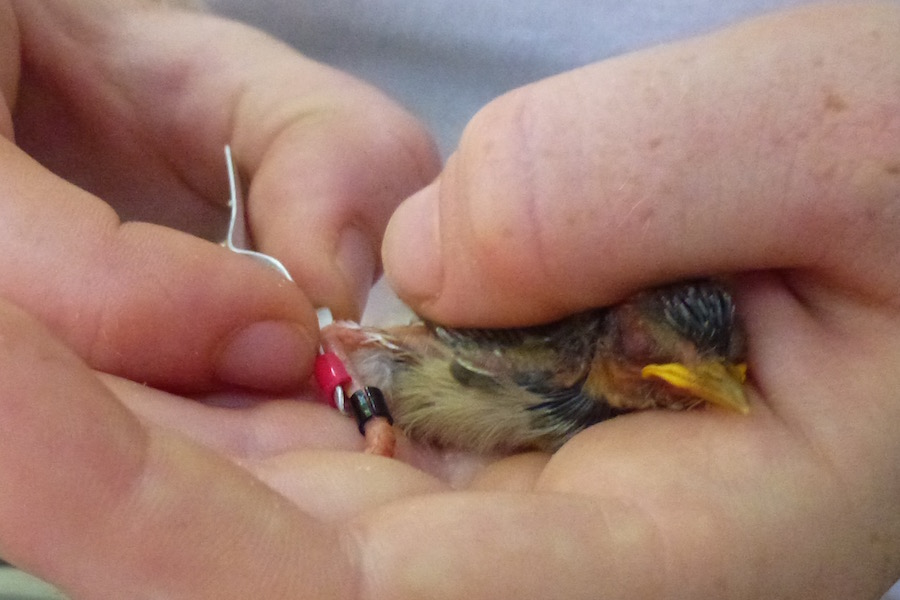
Nestling gets ringed in the bird monitoring program

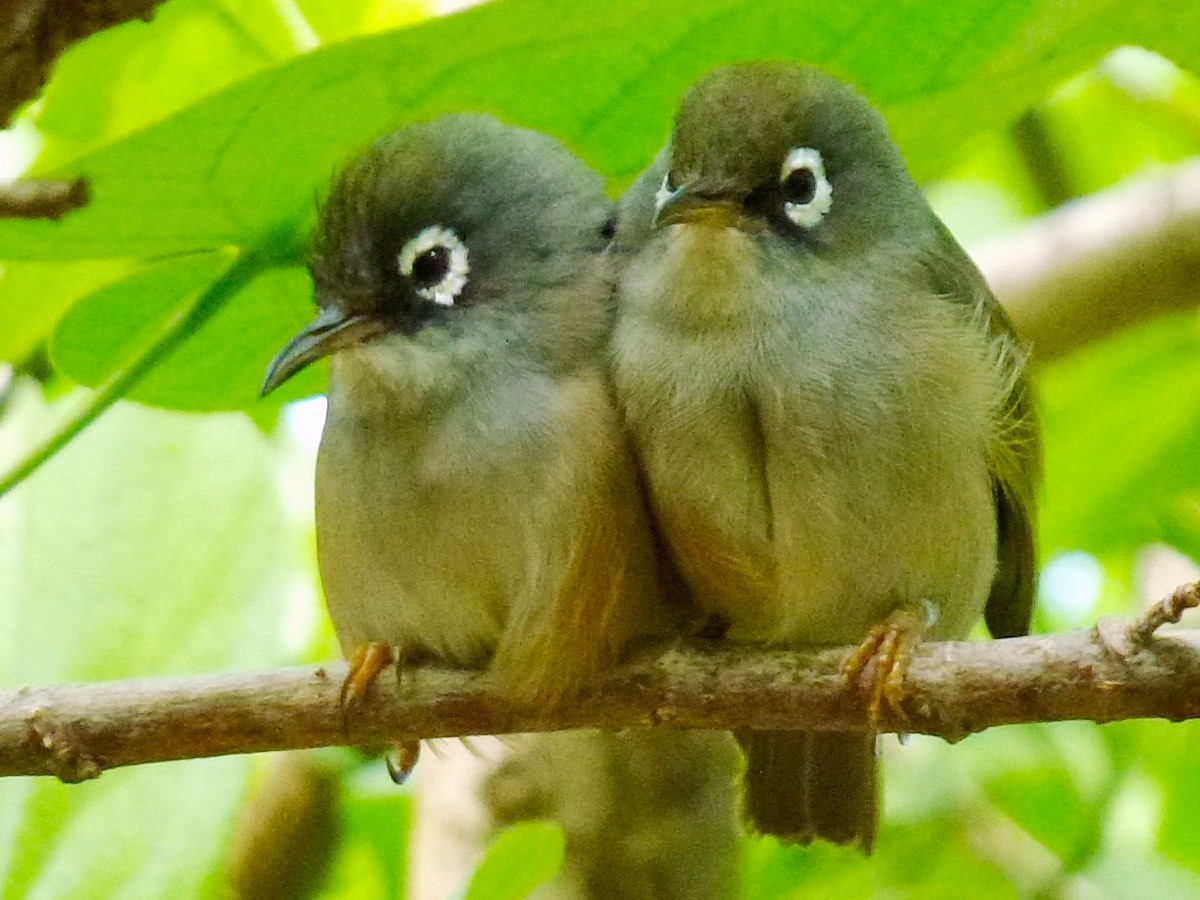
Pair

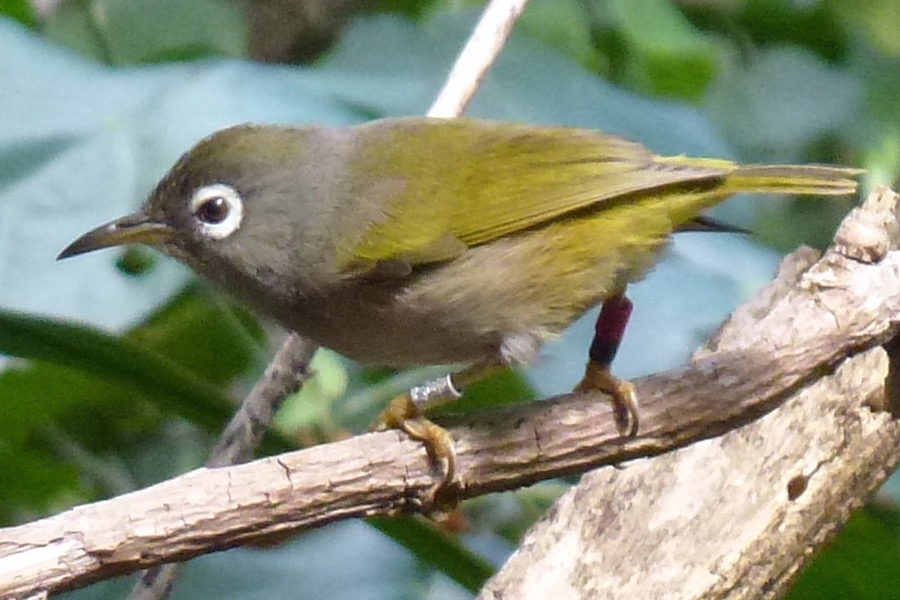
Juvenile
