= Voisey's Bay Mine =

Nickel mine in Labrador, Canada

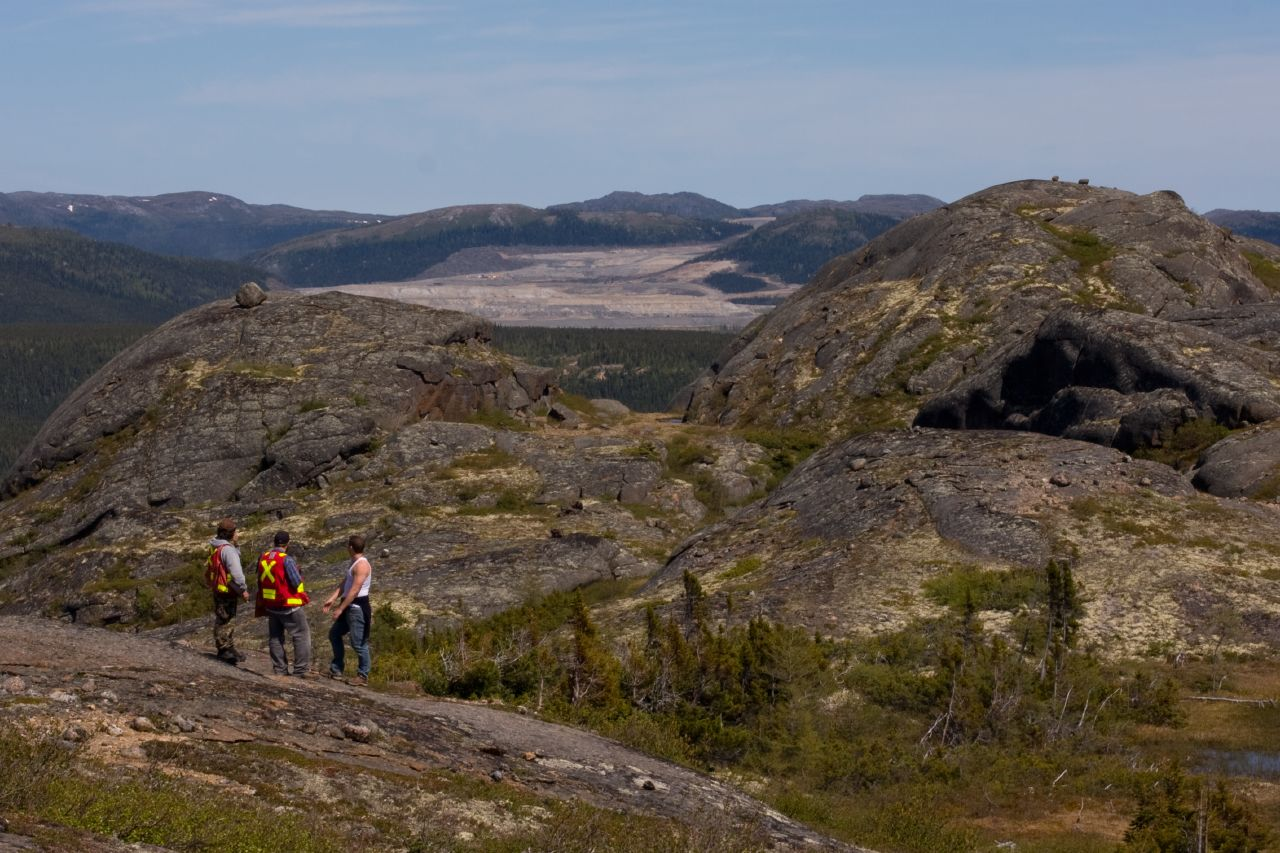
- Open pit mine, Voisey's Bay

- Voisey's Bay
- Location: 56°20′5″N 62°6′11″W
- Discovered: 1993
- Opened: 2005
- Company: Vale Canada Limited
- Website: Vale.com

Voisey's Bay Mine is a nickel mine in Labrador, Canada, near the bay of the same name. The mine is located about 35 km (22 mi) southwest of Nain.

== Nickel deposit ==
A large nickel deposit was discovered in the hills along the western shore of Potato Island in September 1993 by Archean Inc., a prospecting firm hired by Diamond Fields Resources Directors Jean-Raymond Boulle and Robert Friedland. This deposit is considered to be one of the most substantial mineral discoveries in Canada in years and was estimated in 2007 to contain 141 million tonnes at 1.6% nickel.

In 1996, Inco managers purchased the mine for $4.3 billion Canadian dollars from Diamond Fields Resources.

Surface mining began in Voisey's Bay in 2005 in order to access the nickel deposit.

The bulk carrier ship Umiak I was commissioned in May 2006 to transport ore from the mine.

In July 2015, the ownership board of directors approved the construction of the underground phase of the Voisey's Bay Mine. The project was scheduled to take six years, and the underground operations would begin in 2020.

Since the discovery of the Voisey's Bay deposit by Jean-Raymond Boulle President of Diamond Fields Resources, efforts have been increased to find similar deposits in coastal Labrador.

On 11 June 2018, Premier Dwight Ball announced Vale is moving forward with its underground mine at Voisey's Bay. Ball stated that the move will extend the mine's operating life by at least 15 years. Over the five-year construction, more than 16,000 person-years of employment will be created according to Ball. First ore is expected no later than April 2021.

== Long Harbour hydrometallurgical refinery ==
In November 2008 Newfoundland Minister of Natural Resources Kathy Dunderdale announced that construction should start in 2009 to build a $2.2B hydrometallurgical processing plant in Long Harbour on Newfoundland's south coast. Construction of the Long Harbour Nickel Processing Plant would be started in April 2009 and operations would begin in 2014.

== Pollution ==
In 2006, approximately 1,100 cubic meters of toxic mine tailings were released into a nearby brook after a breach in the pond liner. In 2007, 50 cubic meters of tailings slurry spilled into a bog. In 2016, Vale Newfoundland and Labrador pleaded guilty to allowing an undisclosed amount of toxic, untreated water to flow into a nearby cove in 2013. They were fined $30,000.

== Labour issues ==
At present, workers at Voisey's Bay are flown in, via Voisey's Bay Aerodrome, from other communities in the province, and reside at a work camp while onsite. There are no current plans to build a permanent settlement at Voisey.

Workers at the site went on strike in the summer of 2006. A core issue in the dispute was pay equity with workers at Vale Inco's facilities in Greater Sudbury, Port Colborne and Thompson.

The question of where Voisey's Bay ore would be processed had previously been one of the obstacles to developing the site, with the government of Newfoundland and Labrador demanding that a facility be built in the province to provide jobs there, while Inco workers in Sudbury and Thompson were simultaneously threatening to strike if the ore was not sent to their existing facilities in order to preserve and protect their jobs. The existing workers in Sudbury and Thompson eventually accepted a compromise; the ore would be shipped to their facilities until 2011, then a new facility that was being built in Newfoundland would be ready to begin operations. The profits from Sudbury and Thompson would be reinvested in developing new mining sites in those communities.
