= Gongylomorphus borbonicus =

Conservation status
- Extinct (IUCN 3.1)

Scientific classification
- Kingdom: Animalia
- Phylum: Chordata
- Class: Reptilia
- Order: Squamata
- Family: Scincidae
- Genus: Gongylomorphus
- Species: †G. borbonicus

Binomial name
- †Gongylomorphus borbonicus (Vinson, 1969)
- Approximate distribution Depicted: Reunion Island, Southern Africa Range prior to extinction

Species of lizard

Gongylomorphus borbonicus was a small species of skink, a lizard in the family Scincidae. The species was endemic to Réunion.
