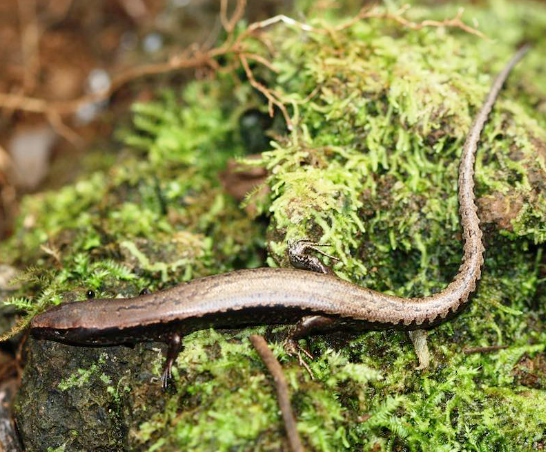

Conservation status
- Endangered (IUCN 3.1)

Scientific classification
- Kingdom: Animalia
- Phylum: Chordata
- Class: Reptilia
- Order: Squamata
- Family: Scincidae
- Genus: Gongylomorphus
- Species: G. fontenayi

Binomial name
- Gongylomorphus fontenayi (Vinson, 1973)
- Approximate distribution Depicted: Mauritius (Flat Island), Southern Africa Range

= Gongylomorphus fontenayi =

Species of lizard

Gongylomorphus fontenayi, the Macchabé skink, is a small species of skink, a lizard in the family Scincidae. The species is endemic to Mauritius. The reptile is the only remaining skink on mainland Mauritius. It inhabits the native forests of Brise Fer, Bel Ombre and Macchabé. They are diurnal lizards and live in the damp forest floor. The population is estimated to be around 10,000 individuals.

== Description ==
A medium-sized skink, around 10cm total length. It is chocolate-brown with dark speckles on the back. A broad dark brown to almost black line runs from the head of the skink to its tail. The underside of the head of the skink is yellowish-brown.

== Characteristics ==
Little is known about Gongylomorphus fontenayi. The only sexual dimorphism is the difference in size: the males are larger than the females.

== Diet ==
Their diet constitutes mainly of invertebrates, but also fruits and seeds.
