= Île aux Aigrettes =

Islet off Mauritius

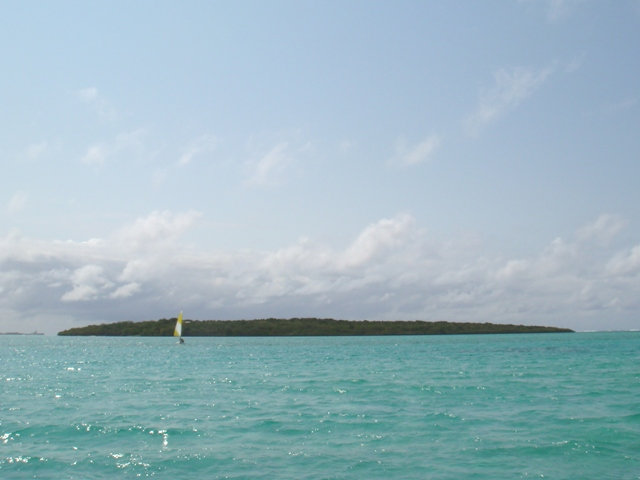
- Île aux Aigrettes seen from the shore of the Mauritius mainland

- Location in Mauritius

Geography
- Location: East coast of Mauritius
- Coordinates: 20°25′12″S 57°43′59″E

Administration
- Mauritius

Demographics
- Population: 200 (est.)

Ile aux Aigrettes is an islet off the south-east coast of Mauritius. It functions as a nature reserve and a scientific research station. It is also a popular visitors attraction—both for tourists and for Mauritians.

== Geography ==
It has an area of 27 hectares (67 acres) and is the largest islet in the Grand Port bay, 850 metres (2,790 ft) off the south-east coast of Mauritius and roughly a kilometer (0.62 mi) from the coastal town of Mahebourg. It is low-lying and is formed from coral-limestone (unlike the majority of Mauritius which is from volcanic rock).

== Nature reserve and conservation ==
Ile aux Aigrettes conserves the world's only remaining piece of Mauritius Dry Coastal Forest—a once plentiful vegetation type. It is therefore home to a large number of extremely rare or endangered species of plants and animals.

Over several hundred years, indigenous flora and fauna was devastated by logging and invasive species. In this sense, the islet shared the same fate as the rest of Mauritius. The Dodo and the indigenous species of giant tortoise became extinct, as did many plant species.

Relicts of some species survived though, and in 1965 the island was declared a nature reserve. There followed intense work to restore the vegetation and the few remaining indigenous animal species. In addition, several other species which had disappeared from the island—but survived elsewhere in Mauritius—were reintroduced.

Reptile species include the large, slow Telfairs Skink, several species of ornately coloured day gecko, and a population of non-indigenous Aldabra giant tortoise, brought to Île aux Aigrettes to take over the important ecological role of the extinct Mauritian tortoises. The large tortoises eat and spread the plant seeds and thereby help the forest to rejuvenate naturally.

The rare, endemic ebony tree species Diospyros egrettarum is named after this island, on which it is plentiful.

== Endemic Mauritius animals on the island ==
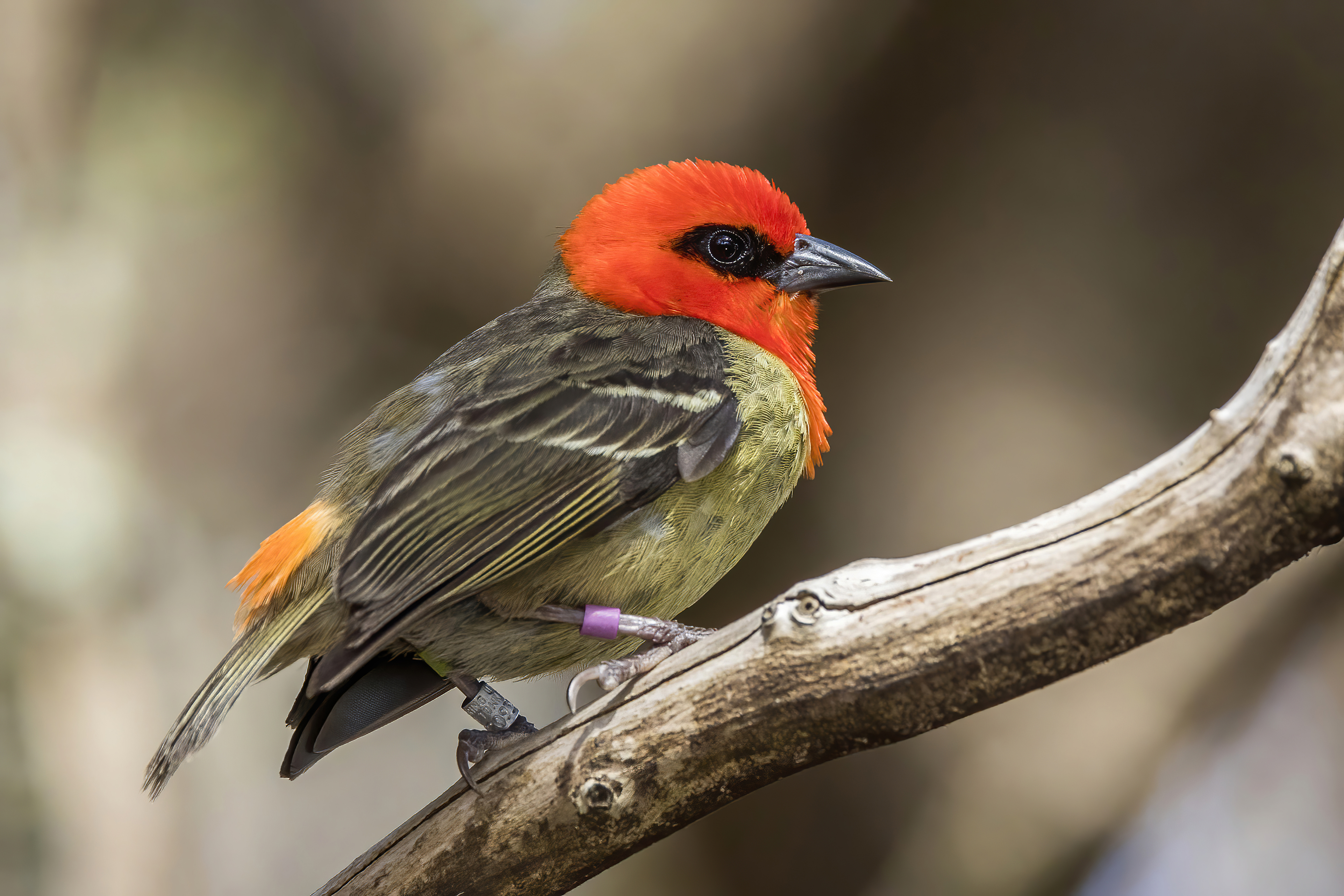
Mauritius fody (Foudia rubra) male

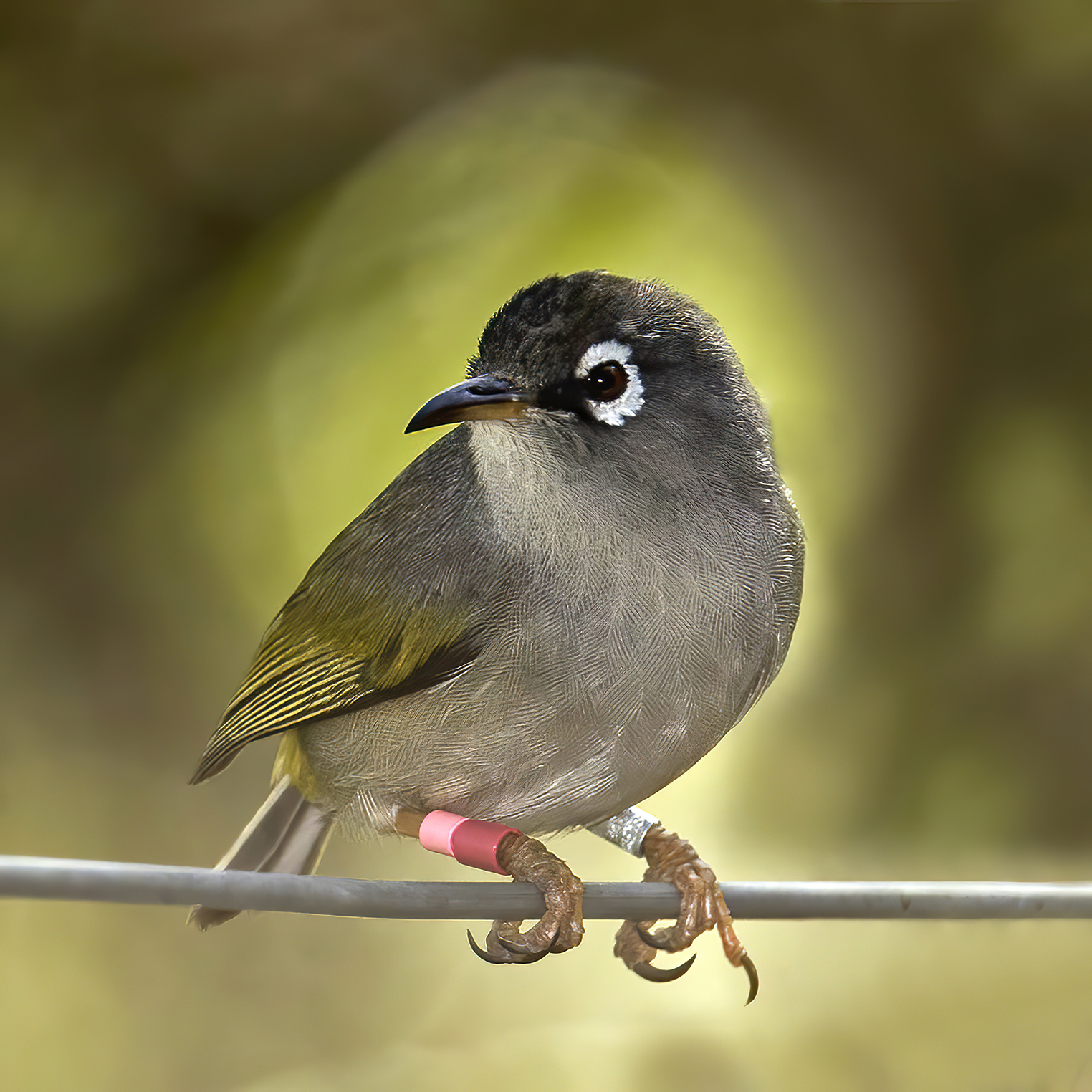
Mauritius olive white-eye (Zosterops chloronothos)

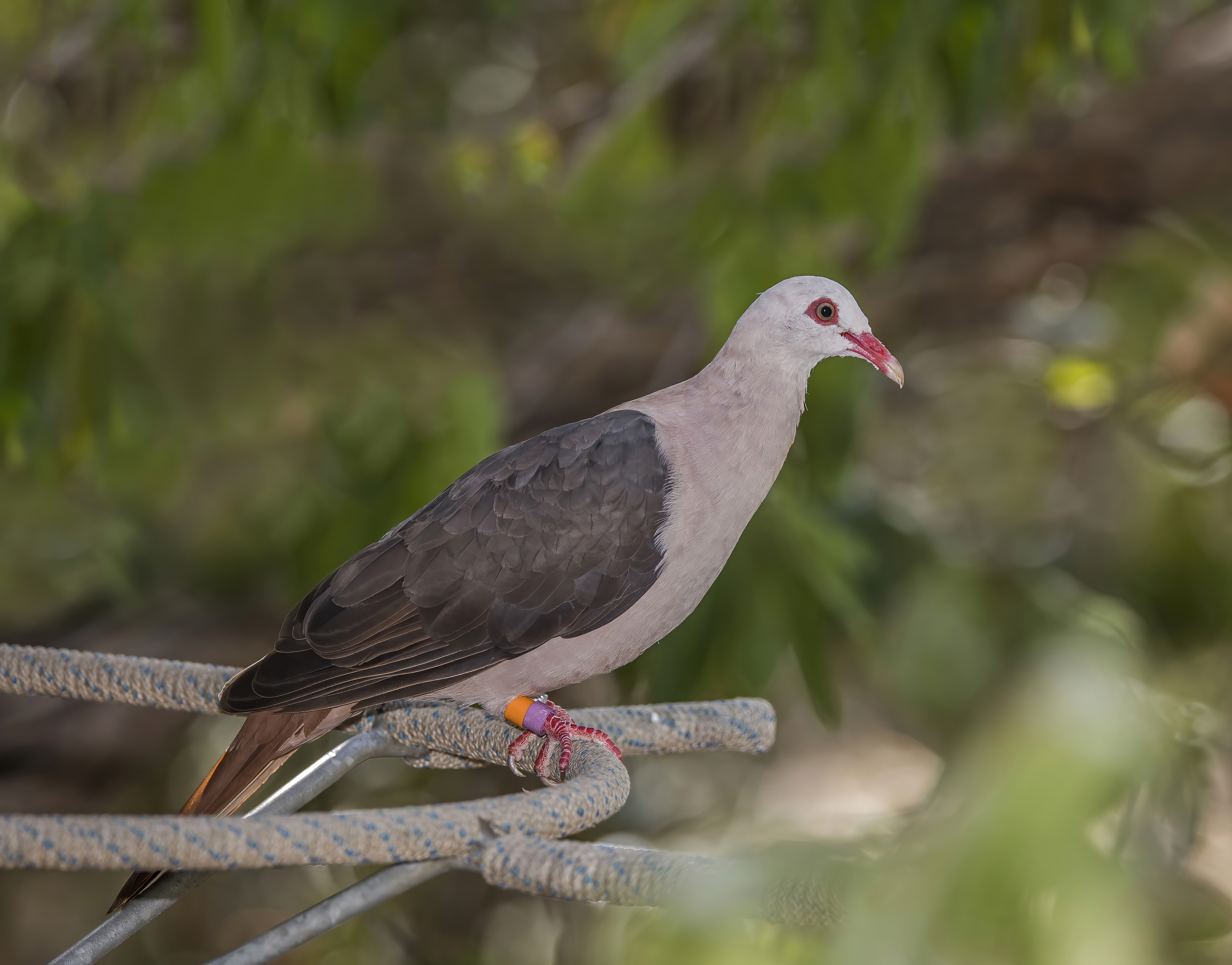
Pink pigeon (Nesoenas mayeri)

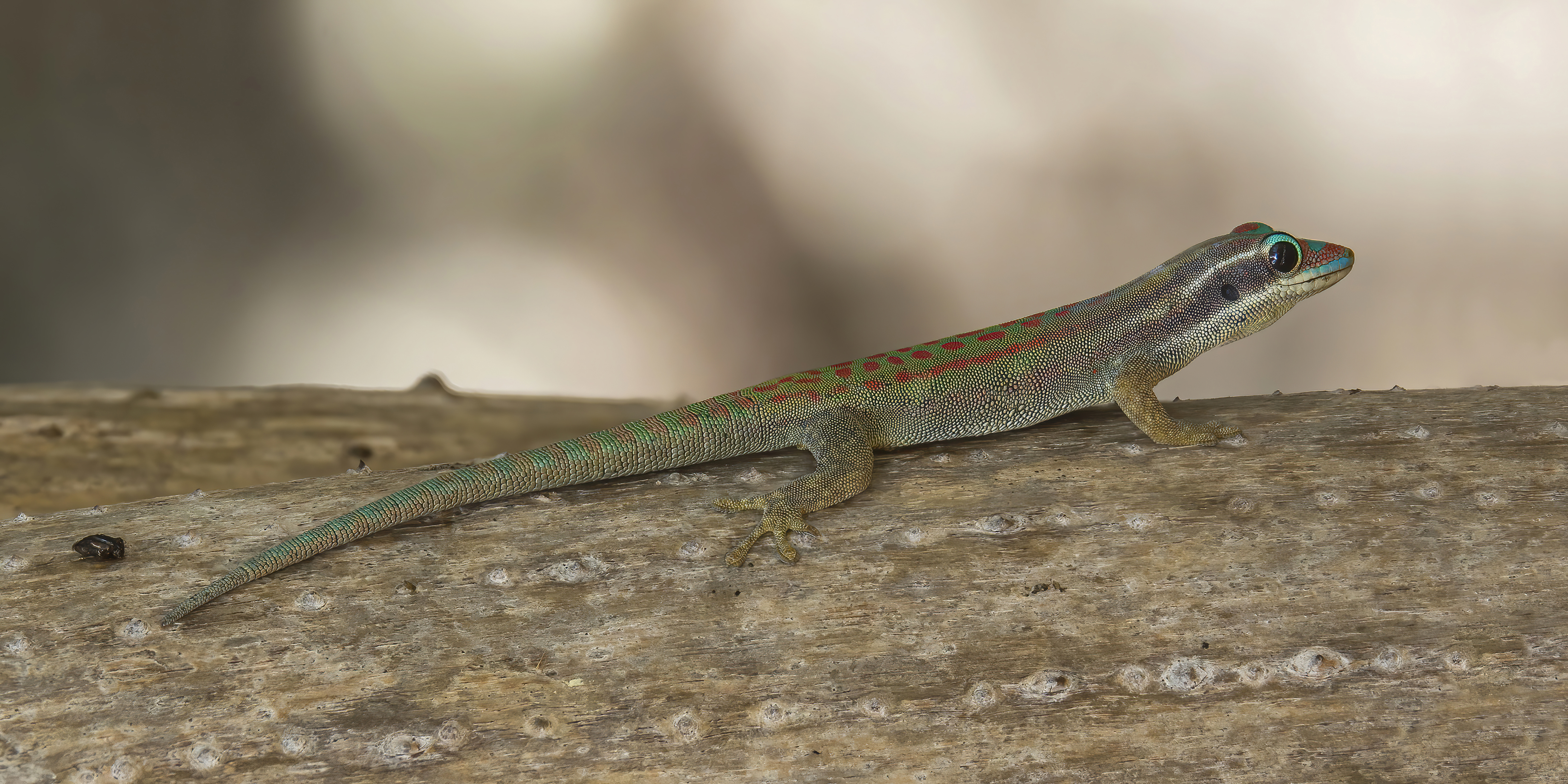
Mauritius ornate day gecko (Phelsuma ornata)

== Other flora and fauna ==
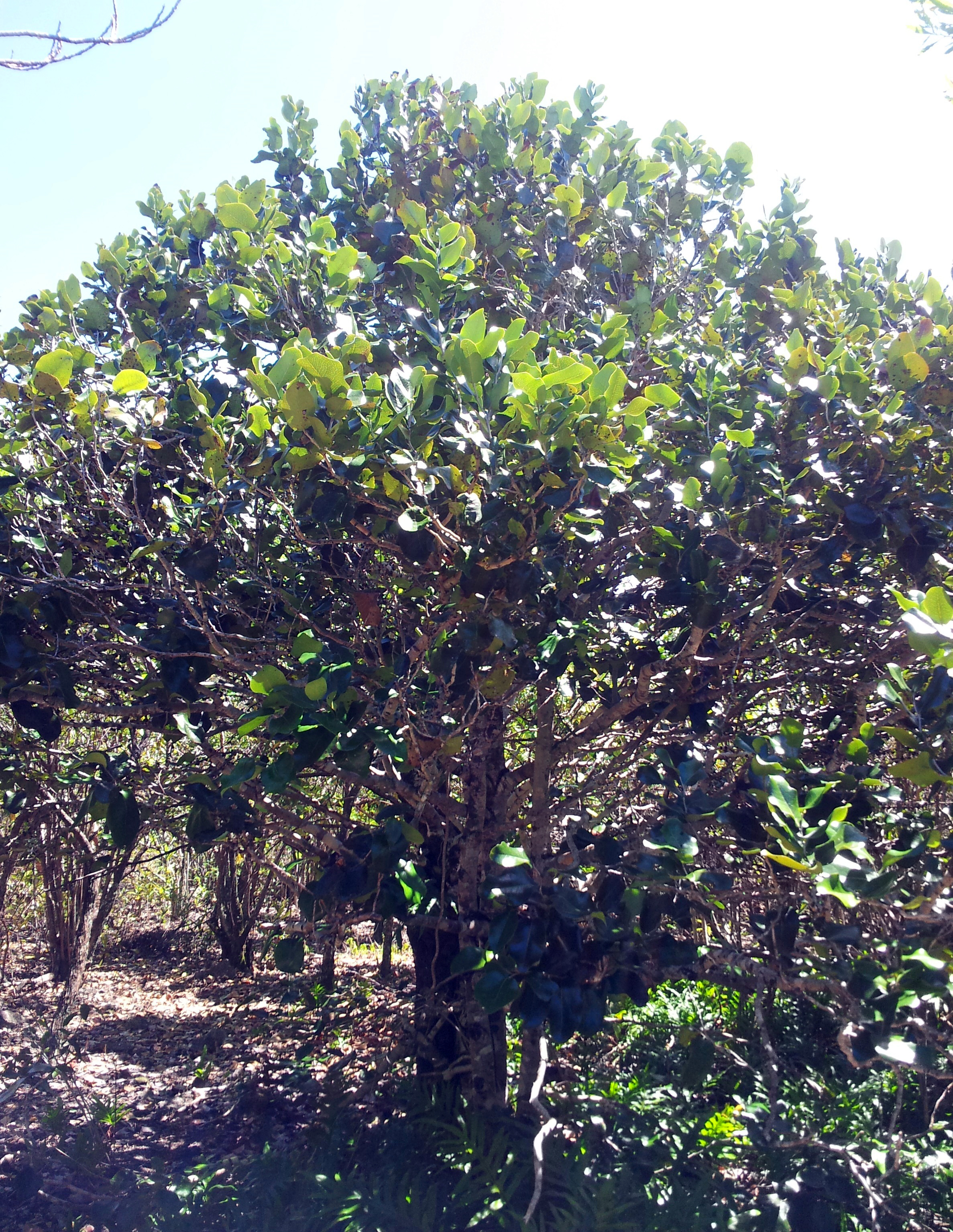
One of the local species of ebony, Diospyros egrettarum (named after the island)

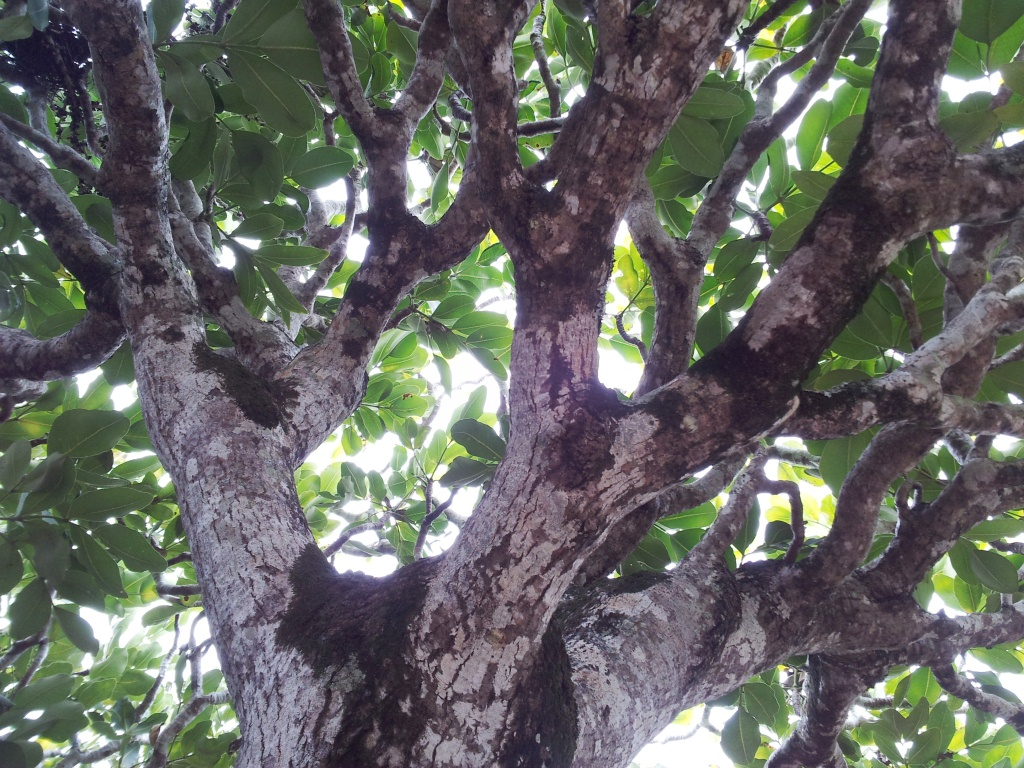
Gastonia mauritiana ("Bois boeuf") forming part of the forest canopy

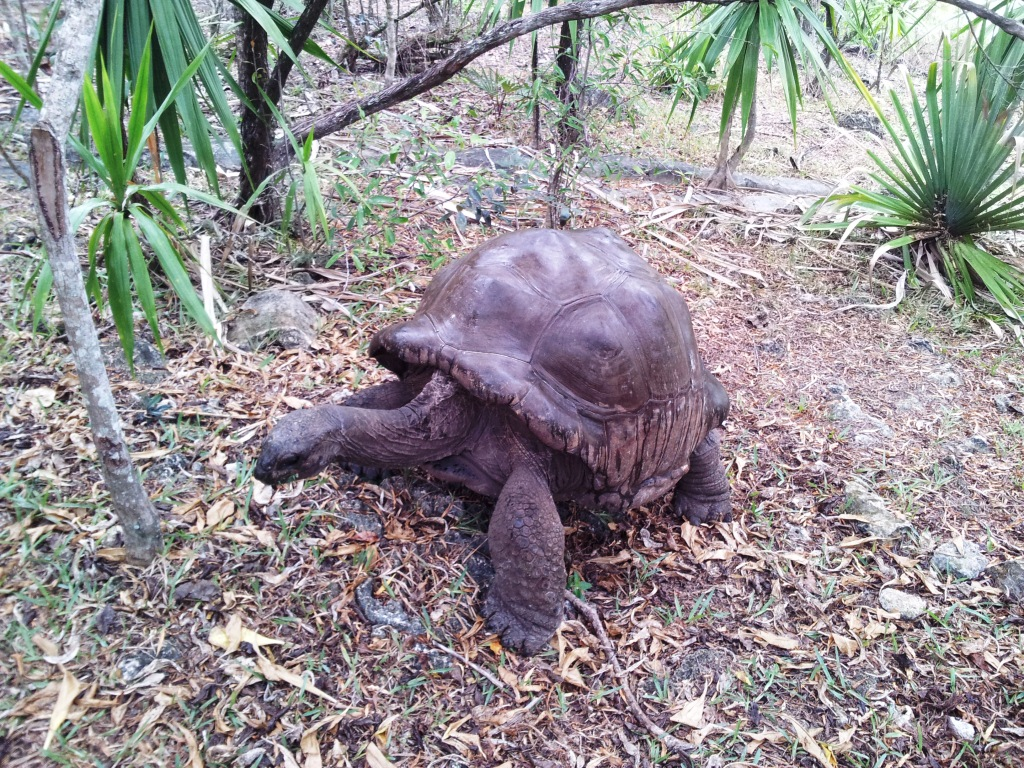
A non-indigenous Aldabra giant tortoise, brought to Île aux Aigrettes to take over the ecological role of the extinct Mauritian tortoises
