= Indian Ocean kestrels =

Group of birds

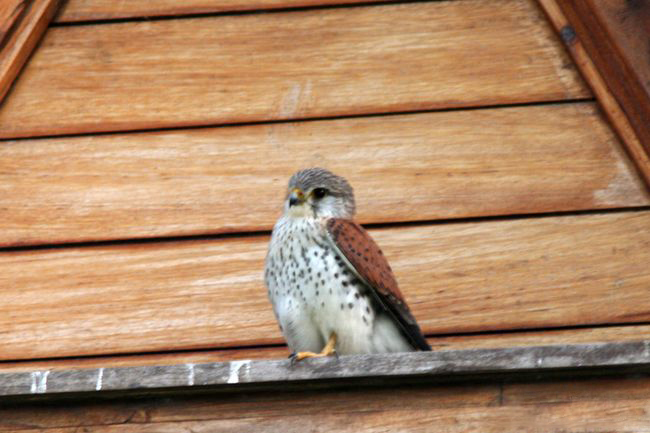
Malagasy kestrel (Falco newtoni)

Isolated on various islands around the Indian Ocean, kestrel populations evolved into different species, like Darwin's finches. Behaviour remains similar to other small species of Falco (such as the common kestrel, Falco tinnunculus) except on (originally) forested Mauritius where kestrels hunt arboreally more like hawks. Due to the scarcity of mammals on oceanic islands, several species have adopted a diet containing many Phelsuma and other geckos. The species can be distinguished by coloration, but all except the banded kestrel share rich brown wings with black spotting. Sexes are alike in color except in the spotted kestrel, where differences are minor. As usual in birds of prey, females are larger than males; considerably so in some of these species as this assists resource partitioning.

== Species ==
Two subspecies of Malagasy kestrel, F. newtoni, are recognised, one on the main island of Madagascar and one on neighbouring Anjouan and Aldabra. It has adapted to human encroachment better than much of Madagascar's wildlife. Its diet is mainly lizards and insects. Confusingly it is sometimes referred to as the spotted kestrel, a name usually used for the Moluccan/Indonesian kestrel, while the Mauritius kestrel's scientific name literally means "spotted falcon/kestrel".

Its closest relative is the Seychelles kestrel, F. araea. Their ancestors diverged probably less than one million years ago (roughly around the early Ionian) It is the smallest of all kestrels, otherwise similar to the Madagascar kestrel (and originally considered the same species). Its range is reduced to Mahé, with a few pairs on Silhouette Island, North Island and Praslin. Its diet is mainly lizards. The species' status, as the following one's, is Vulnerable according to the IUCN.

The Mauritius kestrel, F. punctatus, is more distantly related to the preceding two, having diverged from ancestral Madagascar region kestrels some time in the Gelasian (Groombridge et al. 2002). It is found only on Mauritius. It usually snatches arboreal prey, typically geckos or small birds. Habitat loss and DDT poisoning pushed this species to the brink of extinction, down to possibly as few as six individuals (and an even smaller effective population size) in the mid 1970s. The conservation effort was initially unsuccessful but results improved when new approaches were tried by Carl Jones in 1979. Chicks hatched at a sanctuary run by Gerald Durrell were released to new areas, and the population has now almost reached the carrying capacity of the island; intensive conservation activity has ceased for some time, with the last captive bred birds released in 1994.

The Réunion kestrel, F. duboisi, is probably the latter species' closest known relative. It only inhabited the island of Réunion, but became extinct for reasons not entirely clear around 1700. It is only known from subfossil bones and one brief eyewitness report.

The banded kestrel, F. zoniventris, is also restricted to Madagascar and is less common than F. newtoni. It is found in more arid habitats. It appears to be closer to the mainland African "gray kestrels" Falco ardosiaceus and Falco dickinsoni.

The spotted kestrel, F. moluccensis, is endemic to Indonesia. The nankeen kestrel, F. cenchroides, inhabits Australia and New Guinea. These seem to belong to a lineage much closer to the common kestrel (Groombridge et al. 2002).

Other species of Falco – for example, sooty falcon, Eleonora's falcon, and the peregrine falcon – occur as occasional visitors in the region during migration. These are generally larger and/or entirely differently colored birds.
