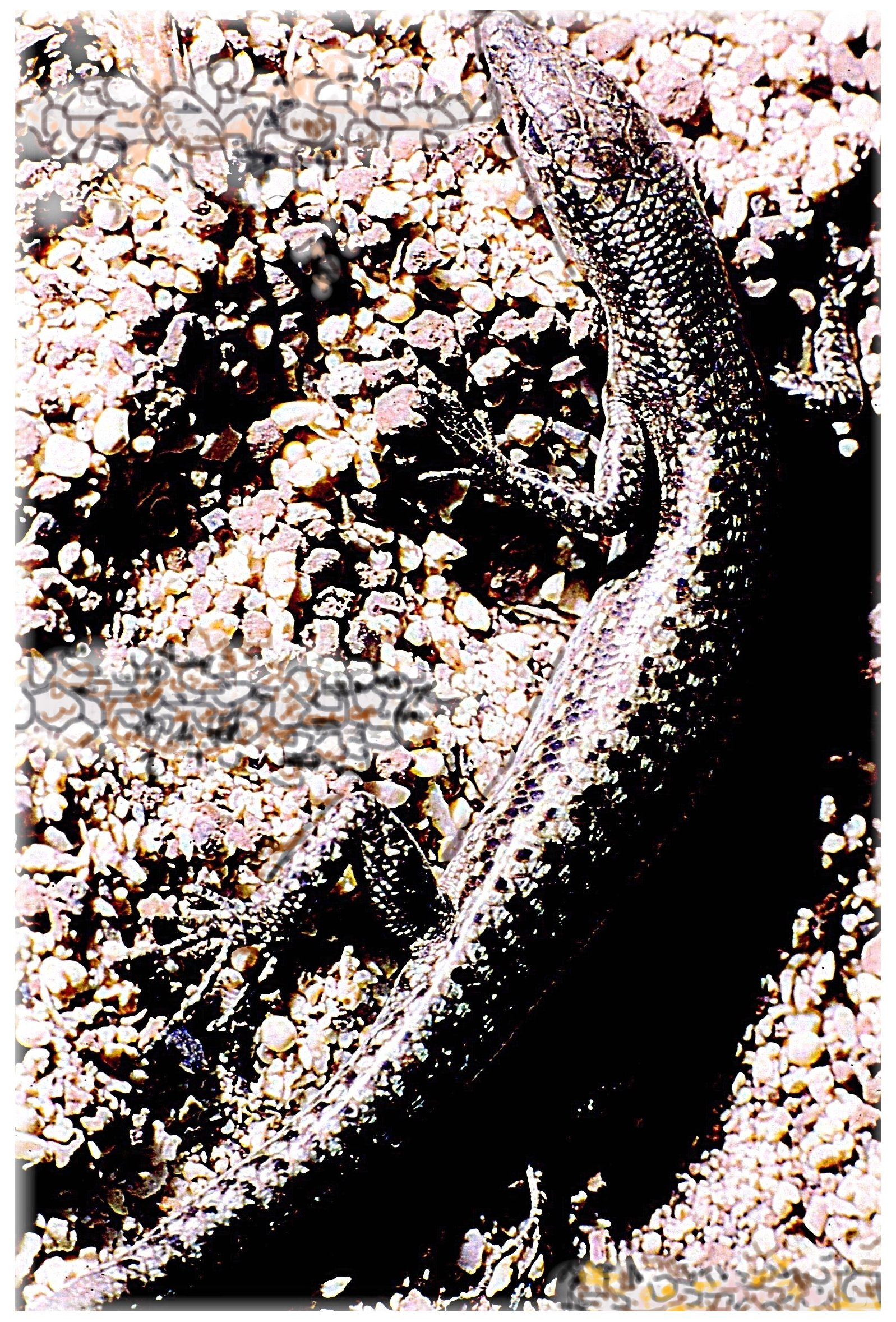

Conservation status
- Near Threatened (IUCN 3.1)

Scientific classification
- Kingdom: Animalia
- Phylum: Chordata
- Class: Reptilia
- Order: Squamata
- Family: Scincidae
- Genus: Cryptoblepharus
- Species: C. boutonii

Binomial name
- Cryptoblepharus boutonii (Desjardins, 1831)

Synonyms
- Scincus boutonii Desjardins, 1831; Cryptoblepharus boutonii — Gray, 1845; Ablepharus boutonii — Strauch, 1868; Cryptoblepharus boutonii — Mertens, 1928

= Cryptoblepharus boutonii =

Species of lizard

Cryptoblepharus boutonii, also known commonly as Bouton's snake-eyed skink, Bouton's skink, and the snake-eyed skink, is a species of lizard in the family Scincidae. The species is endemic to Mauritius, including nearby islets.

== Etymology ==
The specific name, boutonii, is in honor of French botanist Louis Sulpice Bouton.

== Habitat ==
The referred natural habitat of C. boutonii is the marine intertidal zone, at altitudes from sea level to 43 m (141 ft).

== Description ==
C. boultonii may attain a snout-to-vent length (SVL) of almost 5 cm (2.0 in), and a tail length slightly greater than SVL.

== Diet ==
C. boutonii preys upon small species of insects, crustaceans, and fishes.

== Reproduction ==
C. boutonii is oviparous. Clutch size is two eggs.
