= Lesser night gecko =

Conservation status
- Vulnerable (IUCN 3.1)

Scientific classification
- Kingdom: Animalia
- Phylum: Chordata
- Class: Reptilia
- Order: Squamata
- Suborder: Gekkota
- Family: Gekkonidae
- Genus: Nactus
- Species: N. coindemirensis

Binomial name
- Nactus coindemirensis Bullock, Arnold & Bloxam, 1985

Synonyms
- Nactus coindemerensis Bullock, Arnold & Bloxam, 1985 [orth. error]

Species of lizard

The lesser night gecko (Nactus coindemirensis) is a species of lizard in the family Gekkonidae. It is endemic to Mauritius.
