= Ebony Forest =

Ecotourist attraction in Mauritius

Coordinates: 20°26′13″S 57°22′19″E

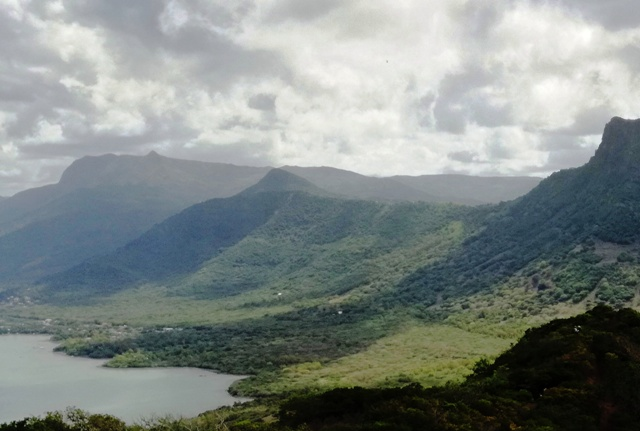
View of Black River Gorges National Park from the south-west

Ebony Forest Reserve Chamarel or just the Ebony Forest is a registered non-profit organisation, registration number: NSIF/2024/0016 conserving Mauritian endemic species with a rehabilitated indigenous forest (including rare semi-dry forest types), situated in Chamarel, in the south-west of Mauritius.

== Establishment ==
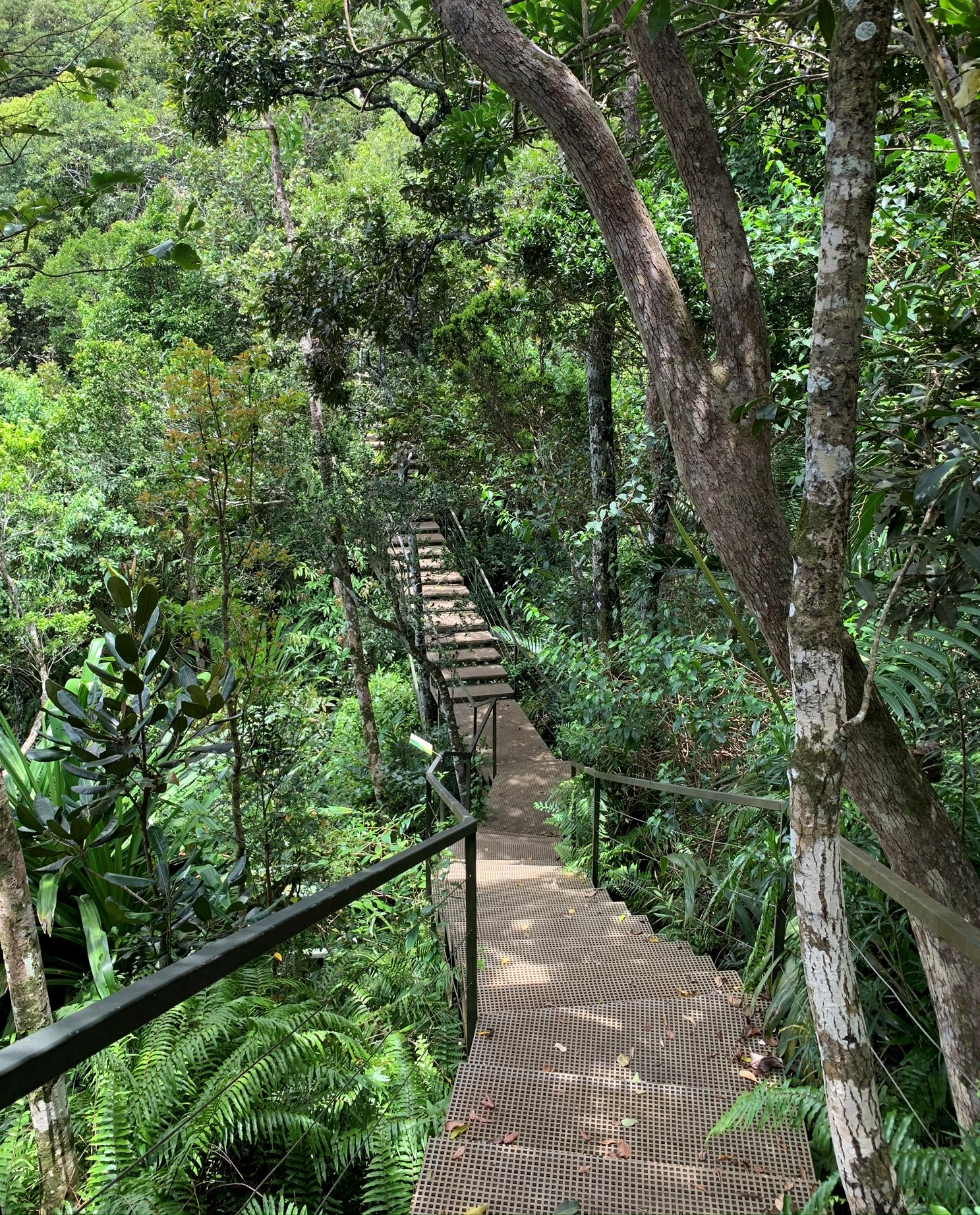
Canopy walkway at Black River Gorges National Park

It was established in June 2017, after 10 years of work in restoring habitats and planting 130,000 endemic plants. In addition to the reintroduced endemic species, the area is home to some of the few remaining stands of original mature endemic ebony trees. At present more than 154,000 plants have been planted and 34 ha have been weeded from invasive plant species.

== Wildlife ==
=== Birds ===
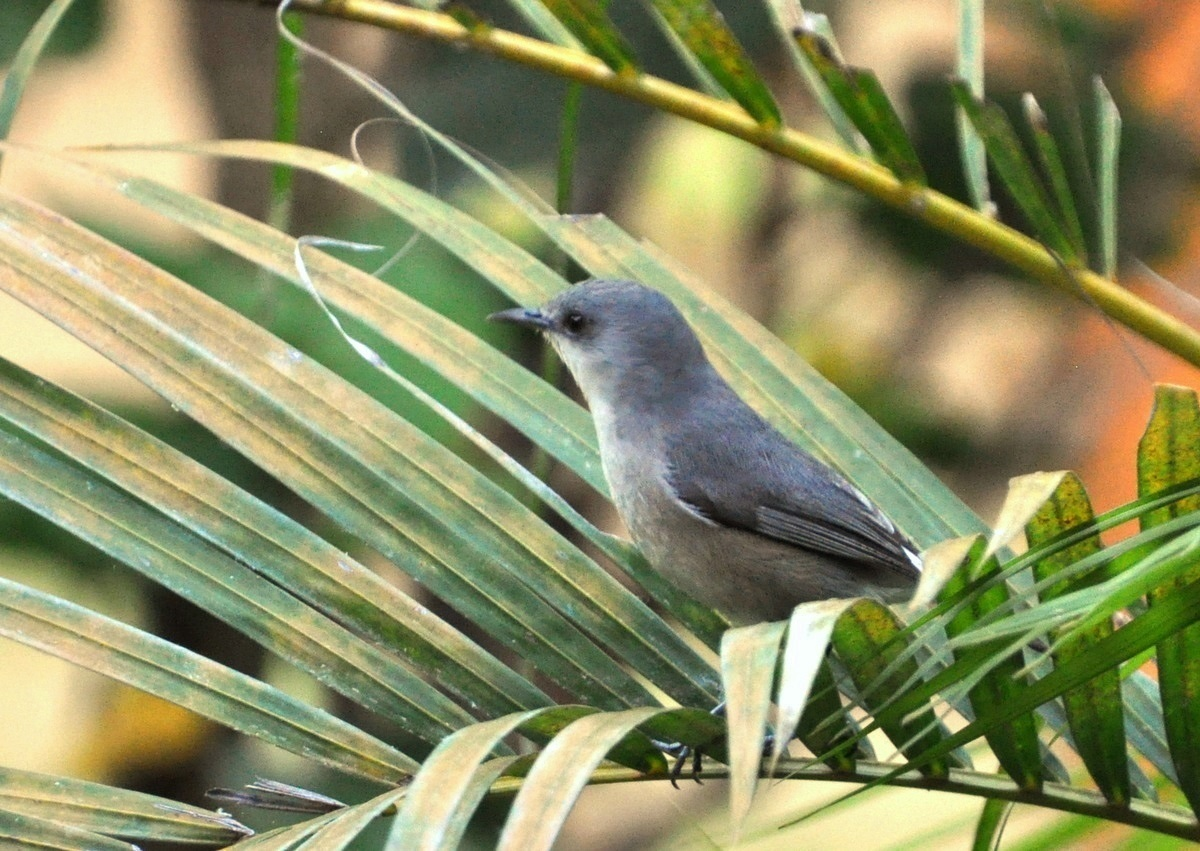
Grey white-eye

Birds commonly found nearby are the Mauritius paradise flycatcher (Terpsiphone bourbonnensis), the echo parakeet (Psittacula eques echo), the pink pigeon (Nesoenas mayeri), the Mauritius kestrel (Falco punctatus), the Mauritius bulbul (Hypsipetes olivaceus), the olive white-eye (Zosterops chloronothos), and the grey white-eye (Zosterops mauritianus).

==== Bats ====
The Mauritius flying fox, Mauritian tomb bat and the Natal free-tailed bat can be found in the area.

=== Flora ===
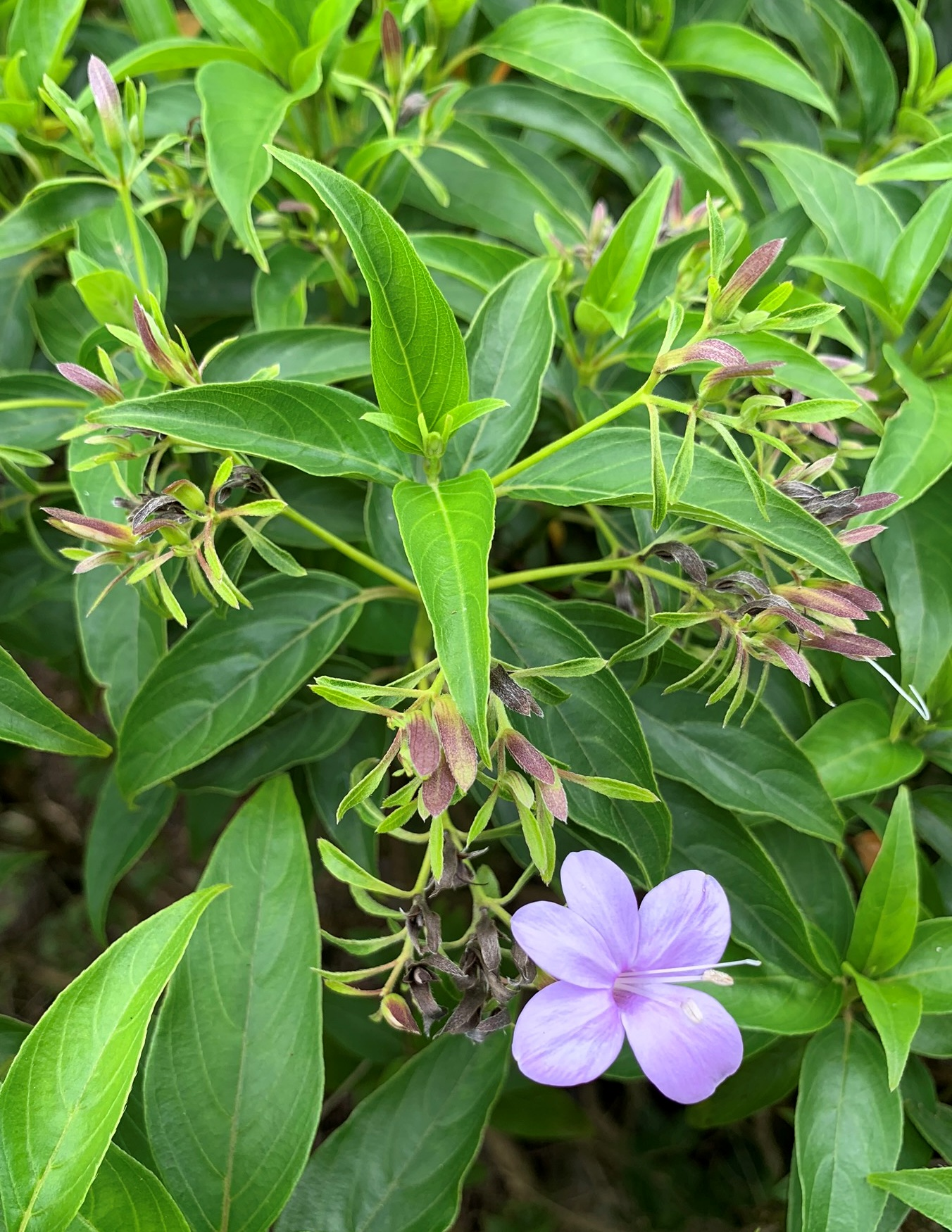
Barleria

The plants include ebony (Diospyros tesselaria), Mauritius coral tree (Chassalia boryana), bois tambour (Tambourissa cocottensis), barleria (Barleria observatrix) and screw pines (Pandanus).

== Facilities ==
Ebony Forest Reserve Chamarel - One of the look-out points in Chamarel. Ebony Forest Reserve runs guided tours or Safari jeep tours. There is a museum, snack point and educational facilities at the Reserve.

It is located next to the Seven Coloured Earths site and near Lavilleon Natural Forest, in the Chamarel area in the south west of the island.
