= 2019 Pan American Games torch relay =

- Host city: Lima, Peru
- Distance: 5,500 km
- Torch bearers: 1,200
- Start date: July 4, 2019
- End date: July 26, 2019

The 2019 Pan American Games torch relay is a 23-day torch run, occurring from July 4 to July 26, 2019, being held prior to the start of the Games. The relay brought the torch from Machu Picchu to the Pan American Ceremonies Venue for the opening ceremony after a lighting ceremony at the Pyramid of the Sun in Teotihuacan, Mexico on 2 July 2019.

== Route ==
| Day | Date | Department | Cities |
|---|---|---|---|
| 1 | July 4 | Cuzco | Machu Picchu, Ollantaytambo, Maras, Sacred Valley, Cusco, Vinicunca |
| 2 | July 5 | Puno | Juliaca, Puno, Lake Titicaca |
| 3 | July 6 | Moquegua | Moquegua |
| 4 | July 7 | Arequipa | Arequipa |
| 5 | July 8 | | |
| 6 | July 9 | Ica | Nazca, Ica |
| 7 | July 10 | Ayacucho | Ayacucho |
| 8 | July 11 | Junín | Huancayo |
| 9 | July 12 | Huánuco | Huánuco |
| 10 | July 13 | Pasco | Cerro de Pasco |
| 11 | July 14 | Huánuco | Tingo María |
| 12 | July 15 | | |
| 13 | July 16 | San Martín | Tarapoto |
| 14 | July 17 | Amazonas | Bagua Grande |
| 15 | July 18 | | |
| 16 | July 19 | Piura | Piura |
| 17 | July 20 | Lambayeque | Chiclayo |
| 18 | July 21 | Cajamarca | Cajamarca |
| 19 | July 22 | La Libertad | Trujillo |
| 20 | July 23 | Ancash | Chimbote, Huaraz |
| 21 | July 24 | | |
| 22 | July 25 | Callao | Callao |
| 23 | July 26 | Lima | Lima |
