= Flic-en-Flac =

- Village
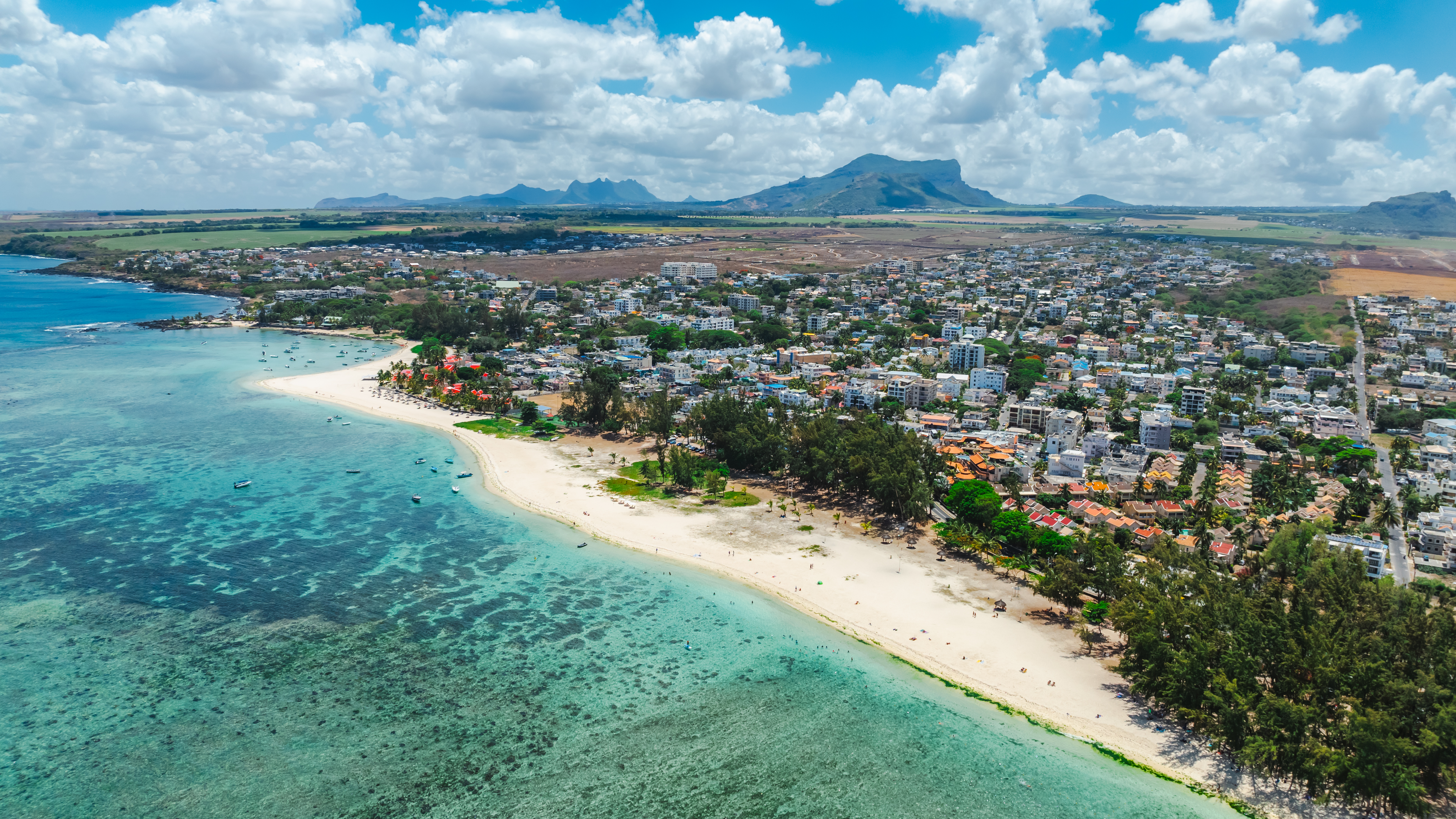
- Flic-en-Flac aerial view

- Location within Mauritius
- Coordinates: 20°16′47.21″S 57°21′59.23″E
- Country: Mauritius
- Districts: Rivière Noire

Government
- Time zone: UTC+4 (MUT)
- Postal code: 90502
- Airport: SSR International Airport (distanced approximately 50 km)

Flic-en-Flac (Mauritian Creole: Flikanflak; French and Mauritian Creole pronunciation: [flikɑ̃flak]) is a seaside village on the west coast of Mauritius in the district of Black River.

The name most likely comes from an Old Dutch phrase, "Fried Landt Flaak", meaning free, flat land. Its public white sandy beach is one of the longest on the island. This public beach attracts local families, tourists and visitors throughout the year. Its lagoon is protected by the surrounding coral reefs. The beach provides scenic views over the Indian Ocean horizon and of Le Morne Brabant Peninsula located in the southwest of Mauritius. Flic-en-Flac is a few kilometres from Tamarin beach. The Casela Bird Park near Flic-en-Flac features orchids, over 140 species of birds and the endemic and endangered rare pink pigeon.

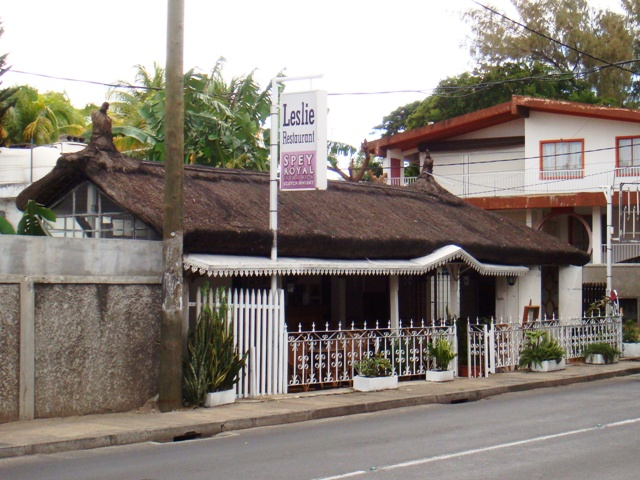
A street in Flic en Flac, Mauritius

Flic-en-Flac is in a non-industrial part of Mauritius, with a coastline of about 13 kilometres (8.1 mi). It is geared towards tourism with many luxury hotels in Mauritius, experiencing about 500,000 visitors yearly. Spread over 10 square kilometres (3.9 sq mi) of Flic en Flac, it hosts about 4 square kilometres (1.5 sq mi) of sugarcane plantations. The town has River Rempart to its south, a La Ferme Reservoir to its northeast, and a groundwater flow which provides freshwater spring to marshes and lagoons near the town.

The beach erosion and corals near Flic-en-Flac have been the subject of several studies on global climate change. According to Sachooda Ragoonaden, the sea level rise is causing a shoreline retreat of 2.7 metres (8.9 ft) per year near Flic-en-Flac.

On the weekend, a lot of locals go to the beach to spend the day with their families and friends, which is a source of entertainment in itself as some of the locals tend to sing and dance to the typical Sega music, music that is mostly played with guitars and "ravannes", a lookalike of the "Bodhrán", but played differently and with hands.

== See also ==
- Île aux Cerfs
- La Pirogue
- List of places in Mauritius
- Rivière Noire District
