= Misión Tiburón =

- Founder: Ilena Zanella, Andres Lopez
- Founded at: Costa Rica
- Type: Conservation association
- Purpose: Environmentalism; Conservation; Ecology; Education
- Headquarters: Guanacaste, Costa Rica

Misión Tiburón is a non profit organisation established in 2009, based on the Pacific coast of Costa Rica. Founded by marine biologists and conservationists Ilena Zanella and Andres Lopez, the organisation focuses on marine research concerning sharks, sea turtles and rays as well as education programs targeted at local coastal communities.

== Operations ==
Misión Tiburón has its operations center in Guanacaste Province, in the North Pacific of Costa Rica. Since 2019, Misión Tiburón also carries out regular shark tagging operations from Golfito, in southern Costa Rica. The organisation focuses its efforts on three main areas: marine education, marine research and political and social advocacy. The main aim of its marine education operations is to raise awareness within Costa Rica as well as globally of the importance of sharks in the oceans, the threats that they are facing and their sharp population decline. The scientific marine research area focuses on sharks and other marine species in order to determine management strategies, hence promote their conservation and responsible use. It is the aim of its political and social advocacy area to use technical and scientific information as a tool for influencing civil society and public policy to promote the conservation of sharks and others marine species.

== Notable initiatives and programs ==
=== Scalloped Hammerhead Shark Project ===
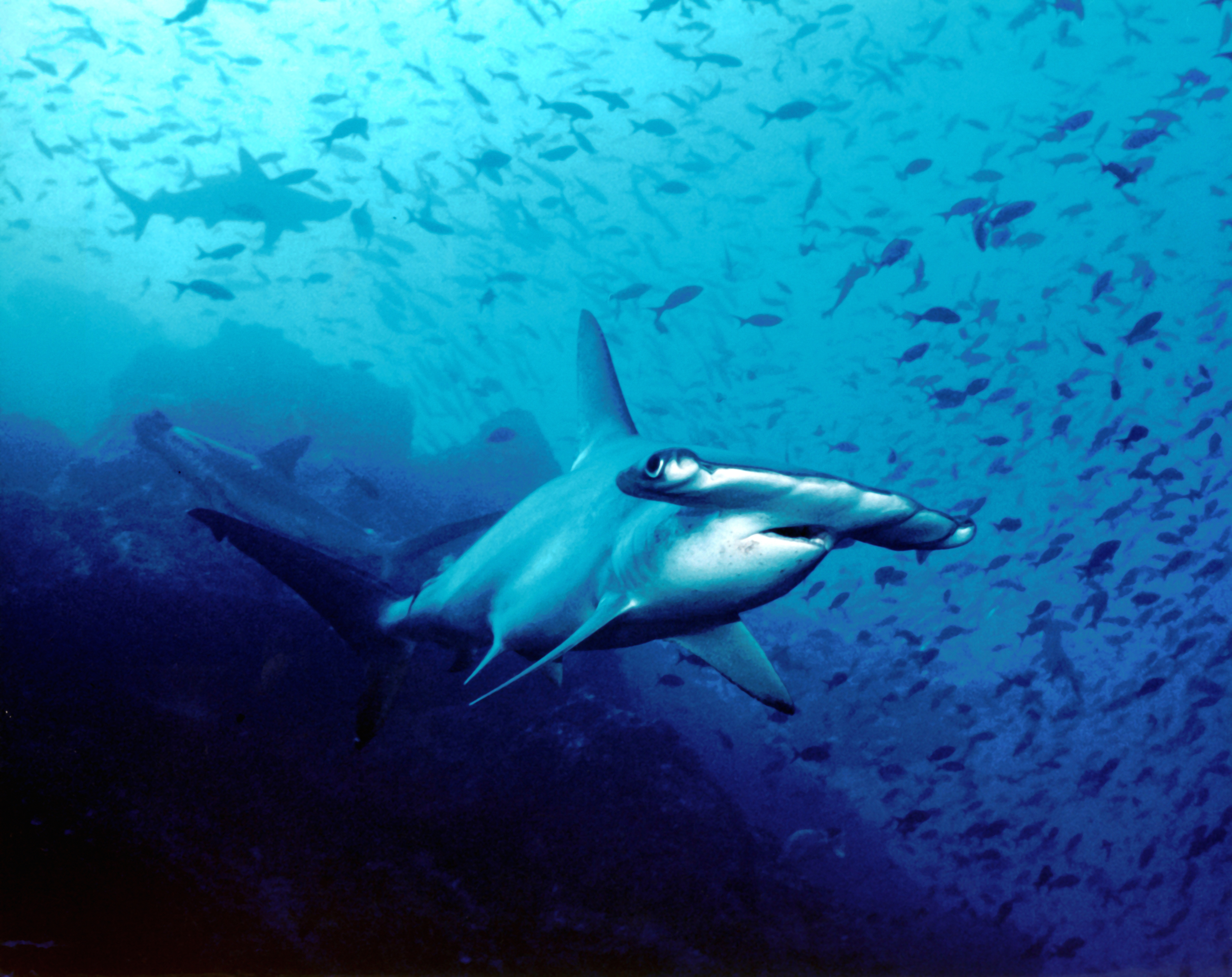
Hammerhead shark, Cocos Island, Costa Rica

The scalloped hammerhead shark (Sphyrna lewini) suffered global population decreases of 95% as a result of horrific “finning” practices, as well as accidental bycatch in long line fishing in pelagic waters. Juveniles, despite having too small fins, are still kept and used as bait for larger sharks. The scalloped hammerhead is one of the sharks most affected by such practises, and according to IUCN Red List is endangered; being a highly migratory species, it is very vulnerable, as conservation efforts have to take place across many nations. In Costa Rica, the traditional dish ceviche incorporates Hammerhead shark meat, contributing to the decline of these vulnerable populations. Following empirical observations in the waters surrounding Cocos Island off the pacific coast of Costa Rica, it was found that populations of adult scalloped hammerhead sharks declined by 45% despite Cocos Island being a protected national park. Misión Tiburón collected scientific data using satellite telemetry and acoustic telemetry shark tagging methods providing evidence, from a high abundance of juveniles, that the coastal waters in Golfo Dulce were critical to the scalloped hammerhead’s survival. Misión Tiburón’s data indicated that whilst adult sharks feed in the rich pelagic waters surrounding Cocos Island, they must migrate over 300 miles – along an underwater mountain range – to reach the mangrove coastal region of Golfo Dulce where females give birth to live young. The pups then remain in the sheltered root system, thriving off rich nutrient waters and benefiting from the protection by avoiding predators. As a result of Misión Tiburón’s work, the coastal regions of Golfo Dulce were assigned as the Scalloped Hammerhead Shark Sanctuary by the government of Costa Rica: this marked the first shark sanctuary in Costa Rica as well as the first shark sanctuary in the world focused on protecting juvenile sharks. The protected area covers over 10,000 acres of habitat in the Golfo Dulce region.

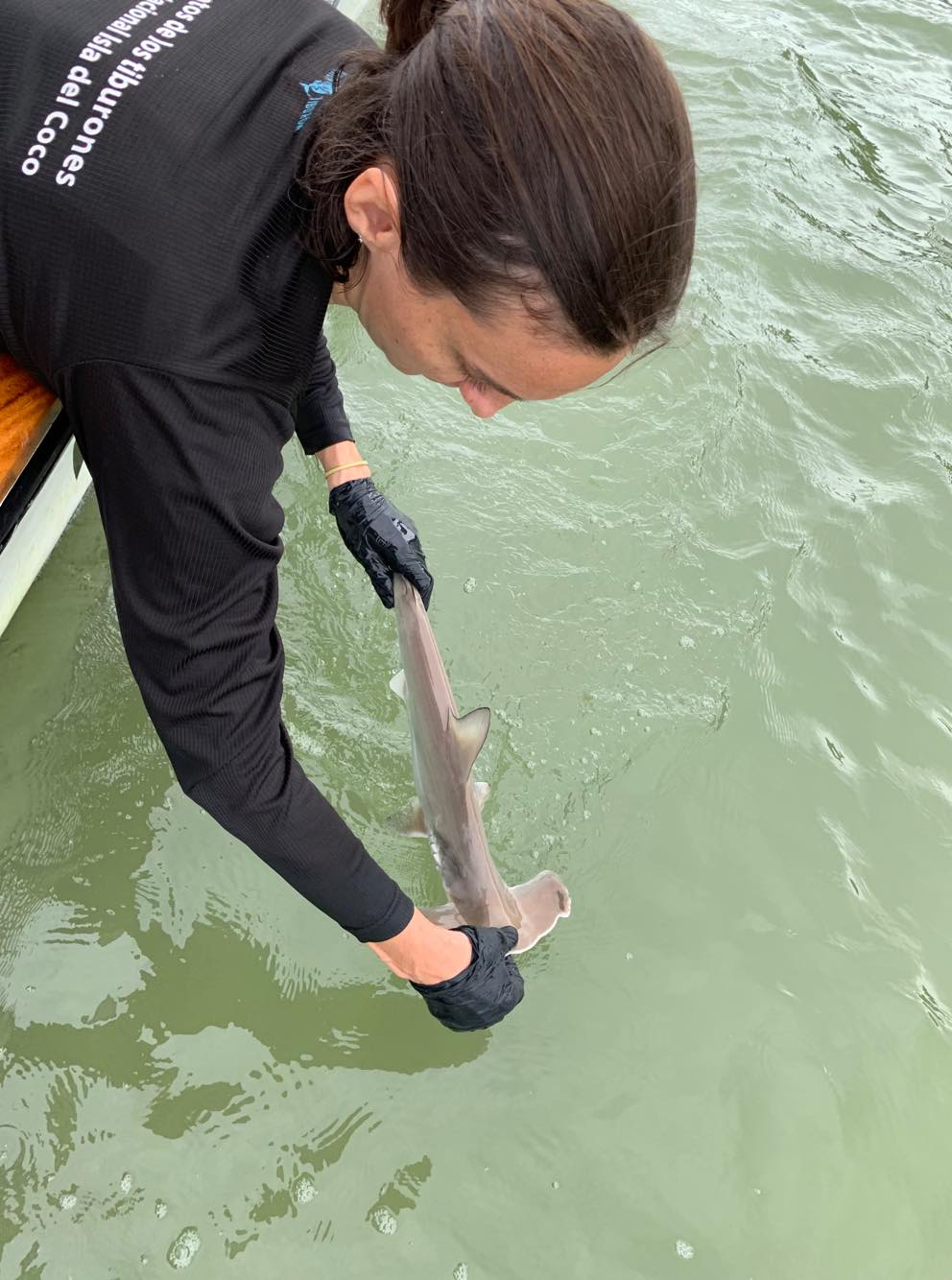
Illena Zanella with a juvenile scalloped hammerhead shark in Golfo Dulce

=== Whitetip Shark Project ===
The whitetip reef shark (Triaenodon obesus) gains its name from the unmissable white tipped dorsal and caudal fins, inhabiting global tropical coastal waters as well as coral reefs. The Whitetip shark populations are threatened by multiple human activities including fishing; in Costa Rica, Misión Tiburón is focusing on conserving these sharks through tagging programs to track their populations, of which little is currently known. The program focuses around Cocos Island National Park and other hot spots off the Pacific Coast of Costa Rica.

=== Bull Shark Project ===
The bull shark (Carcharhinus leucas) is a migratory species distributed globally – in mostly warm, shallow waters such as rivers and estuaries, being fresh or salt water. Juvenile sharks require the protection of mangrove coastal regions, such as Potrero Grande Mangrove and Punta Respingue Mangrove in Costa Rica, to thrive. These important habitats and populations lack scientific data, which could aid in the conservation of this species vulnerable to fisheries. Misión Tiburón aims to collect such data using acoustic and satellite tagging programs, utilising their findings to promote conservation of the Bull Sharks by working with local communities and approaching the governmental sector.

=== Marine Education ===
Misión Tiburón recognises that conservation involves education, their motto being “conocer para proteger”; as part of their work to conserve the scalloped hammerhead shark, they run educational activities in local coastal communities as well as participatory workshops with local fishermen operating in the Golfo Dulce region. By communicating with such fisheries, they can prevent mortality rates of juvenile hammerhead sharks. “Shark Route” is another scheme that focuses on educating elementary aged students about marine resources and the importance of the sharks’ role in aquatic ecosystems, as well as their vulnerability to human activity. Misión Tiburón aims to help educate over 3,000 public-school students with the message of “Save the Hammerhead Shark”, with plans to construct a learning station in the port town of Golifto, situated in the Golfo Dulce region along the pacific coast.

=== Cocos Island's Training Program for Rangers ===
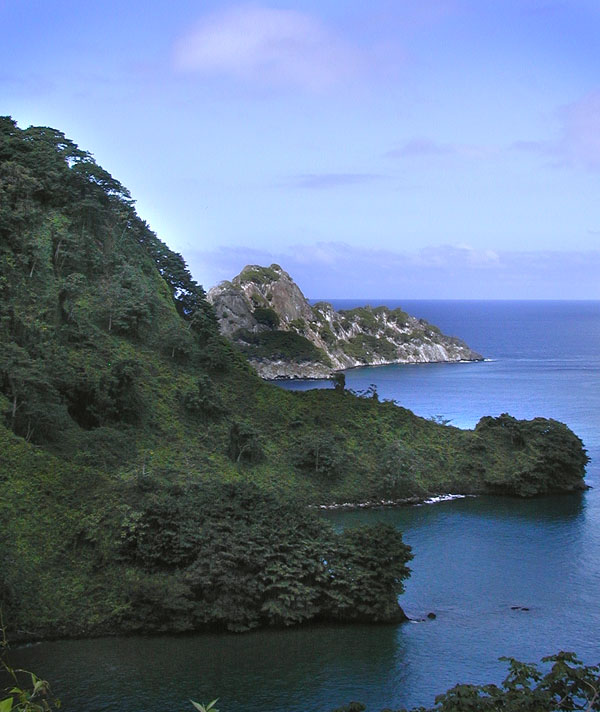
Cocos Island Costa Rica

Cocos Island National Park is a marine life hotspot, hosting a variety of biodiversity, 530km from mainland Costa Rica in the Pacific ocean. There are no permanent residents inhabiting the Island apart from park rangers, visiting scientists and tourists on day trips. Misión Tiburón is working with the rangers, conserving the island through education of new biological skills. By training the park rangers on how to obtain scientific data on the pelagic species through technical assistance, Misión Tiburón can collaborate with the research station on Cocos Island to help tackle illegal fishing.

== Awards, Sponsors and support ==
Misión Tiburón signed a Cooperation Agreement with the National System of Conservation in March 2010, formalising an alliance with Cocos Island Marine Conservation Area (ACMIC) allowing collaboration of education and technical training. Misión Tiburón also worked with the Rainforest Trust for the establishment of the juvenile shark sanctuary in Golfo Dulce. Through Misión Tiburón's efforts, in 2018 Golfo Dulce was nominated and assigned a " Hope Spot” following the regions recognition for being critical to the survival of the scalloped hammerhead shark species; in particular, the vulnerable juveniles and pups. Misión Tiburón is thus supported by the global organisation Mission Blue, a charity created by the oceanographer Dr Sylvia Earle. After being presented with the Whitley Award in 2019, Ilena Zanella secured £40,000 of funding for one year and her organisation Misión Tiburón gained support from the Whitley Fund for Nature. This UK-registered charity, established in 1993, supports conservational organisation globally with funding and by helping to raise awareness, through social media.

== In the media ==
As part of the Whitley Award recognition to Ilena Zanella in 2019, a short film of Misión Tiburón’s work was released, narrated by Sir David Attenborough. In July 2020, Ilena Zanella was interviewed by Kate on Conservation and the article was published in National Geographic Kids Ocean Special issue.

Several other articles on Misión Tiburón and its founders Ilena and Andres have been published nationally and internationally:

- Virtuani, Paolo (July 26, 2019). "Ilena Zanella tra gli squali martello: «Sono timidi, li salvo»". Corriere della Sera.
- Martins, Alejandra (May 13, 2019). "La científica que ganó el "Oscar verde" por ayudar a crear el primer santuario de tiburones de Costa Rica". BBC News Mundo.
- "Protecting tomorrow: conserving hammerhead sharks in Costa Rica – oceanographic – Oceanographic".
- "Teletica.com | Con vos". www.teletica.com.
- "Tica recibe prestigioso premio por su labor en la conservación del tiburón martillo | Teletica". www.teletica.com.
- Wight, Andrew (January 17, 2020). "Conserving These Weird Sharks Could Help Hammer Climate Challenges In Costa Rica". www.forbes.com.
