= Albion, Mauritius =

Village in the west of Mauritius

Albion
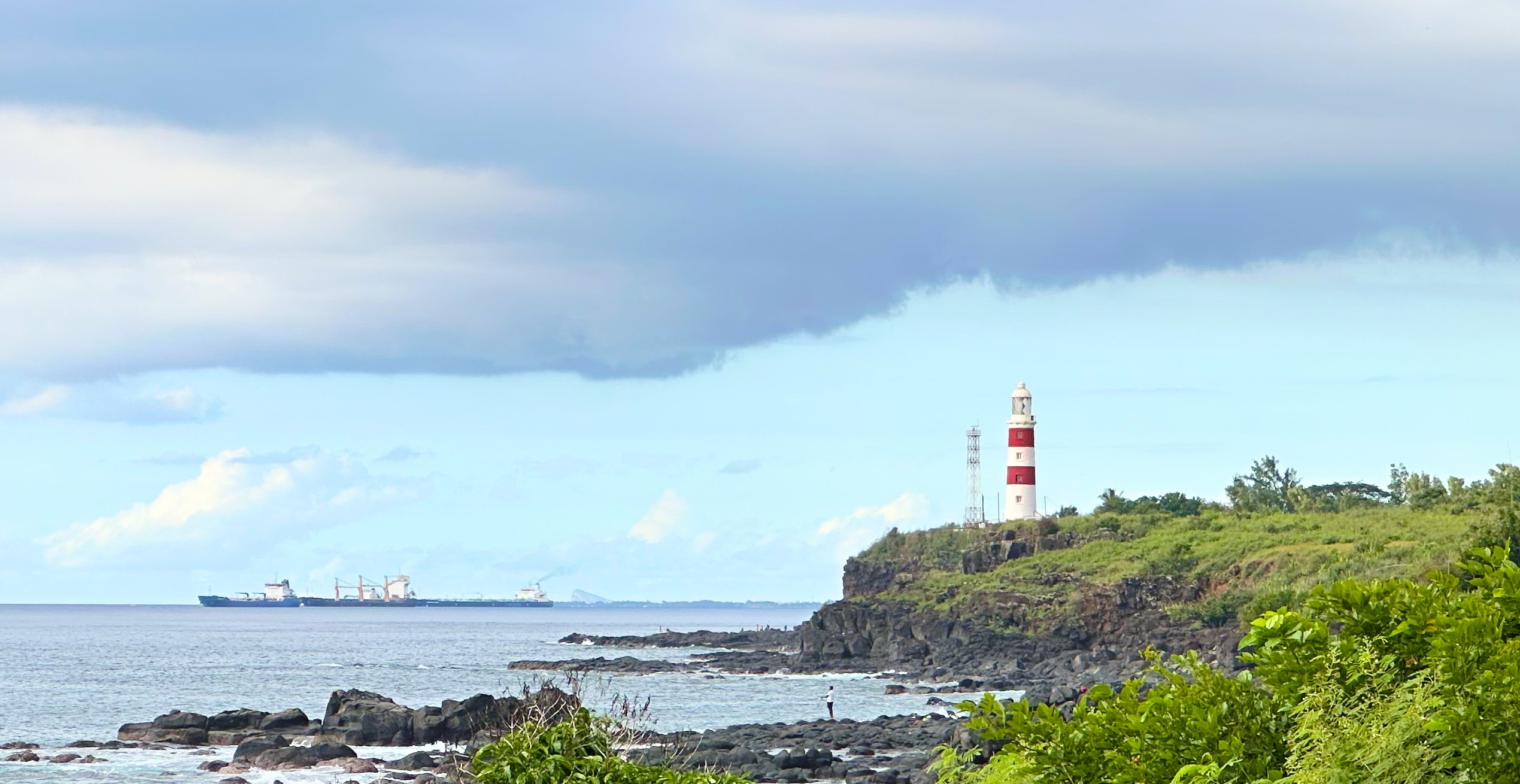
- Lighthouse at Albion

- Village location
- Coordinates: 20°12′50.67″S 57°24′28.77″E
- Country: Mauritius
- District: Black River

Area
  - Land: 6.64 sq mi (17.20 km^{2})

Population (2020)
  - Total: 6,042
  - Density: 909.8/sq mi (351.3/km^{2})
- Time zone: UTC+4 (MUT)

Albion is a locality situated within the Rivière Noire District of Mauritius. As of the 2020 census, the town had a population of 6,042 inhabitants. It is part of the District Council of Black River.

The coastal area adjacent to Albion is encircled by reefs, a characteristic typical of Mauritius. Historically, Albion has served as a notable docking site for numerous ships. Among the notable maritime events is the sinking of the Banda in 1615, resulting in the demise of Governor Pieter Both.

== Albion Lighthouse ==
The Albion Lighthouse is a historic maritime landmark situated at Pointe aux Caves, on the coastline of Albion, Mauritius. It was commissioned in 1909, by Governor Sir Cavandish Boyle and construction ended on October 3, 1910. The structure rises up to 30 Meters high and offers an excellent view over the region.

== Treasure of Pirate La Buse ==
In 2023, a group of seven lifelong friends, believe they have uncovered the site of the legendary pirate La Buse's treasure after discovering man-made markings on rocks during a hike. Despite initial skepticism, their determination led them to gather evidence, including using a gold detector to confirm the presence of gold and diamonds. With support from Mauritian authorities, they presented their findings to engage local and foreign archaeologists. However, bureaucratic procedures and funding delays have stalled further exploration, even though preliminary assessments confirm the site's significance. The quest for La Buse's treasure, spanning centuries and various islands in the Indian Ocean, continues to captivate treasure hunters, perpetuating the mystery surrounding its location.

== Archaeological Discoveries ==
Archaeological excavations at an unmarked cemetery in Albion, led by Stanford's Krish Seetah, have uncovered skeletons revealing insights into historical epidemics and living conditions. The project, which began after human remains were found on local resident Vanessa Vincent's property, has uncovered several skeletons with signs of hardship, such as burials without coffins. While it's unclear if the remains belonged to enslaved individuals, the findings provide clues about life in the past. Future DNA analysis will help trace the origins of the deceased, and a memorial is planned to honor them after reburial at St. Martin cemetery.
