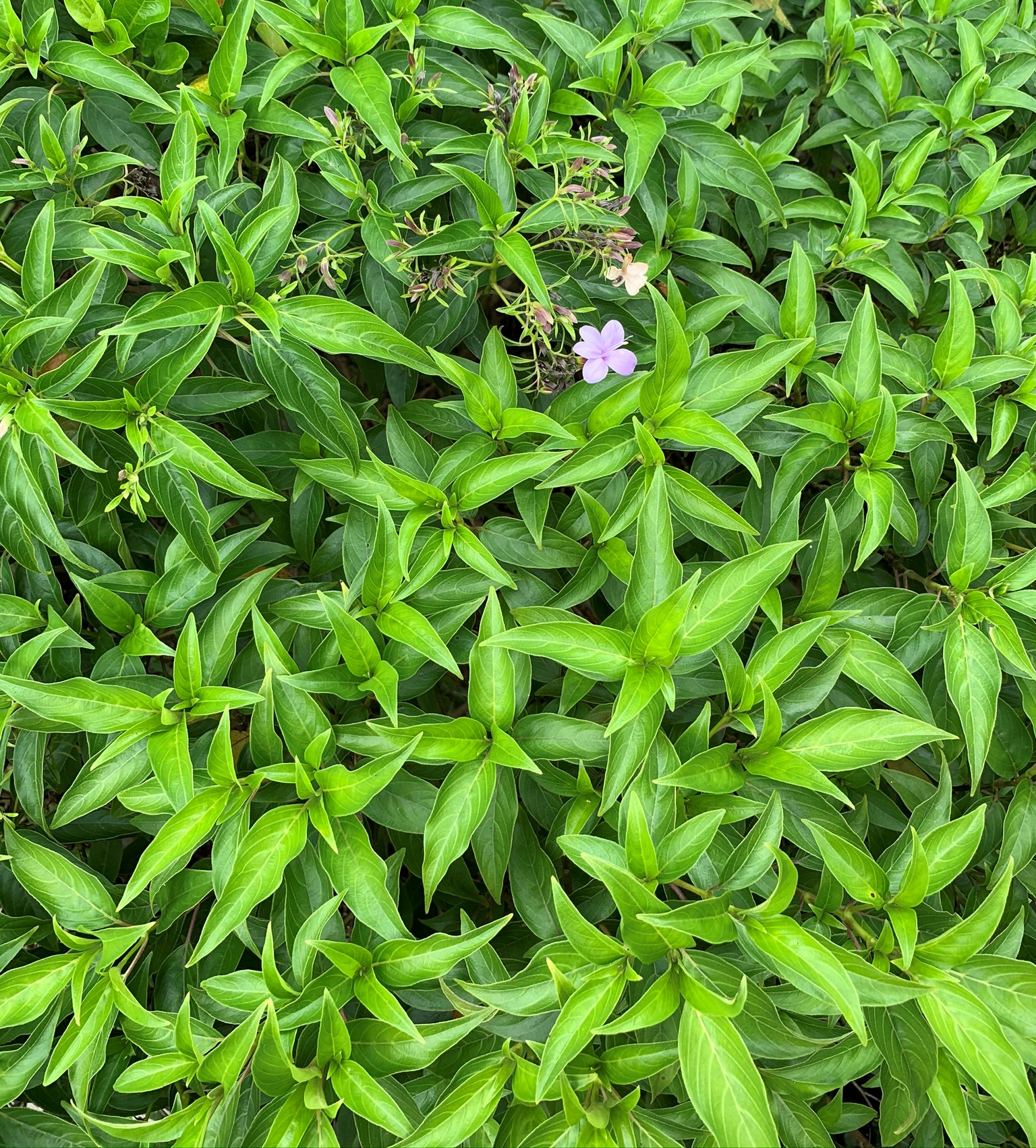
- Specimen at Ebony Forest

Conservation status
- Critically Endangered (IUCN 2.3)

Scientific classification
- Kingdom: Plantae
- Clade: Tracheophytes
- Clade: Angiosperms
- Clade: Eudicots
- Clade: Asterids
- Order: Lamiales
- Family: Acanthaceae
- Genus: Barleria
- Species: B. observatrix

Binomial name
- Barleria observatrix Bosser & Heine, 1988

= Barleria observatrix =

Species of flowering plant

Barleria observatrix is a species of plant in the family Acanthaceae. It is endemic to Mauritius. Its natural habitat is subtropical or tropical dry forests.
