= Rivière Noire District =

Rivière Noire Black River
- District
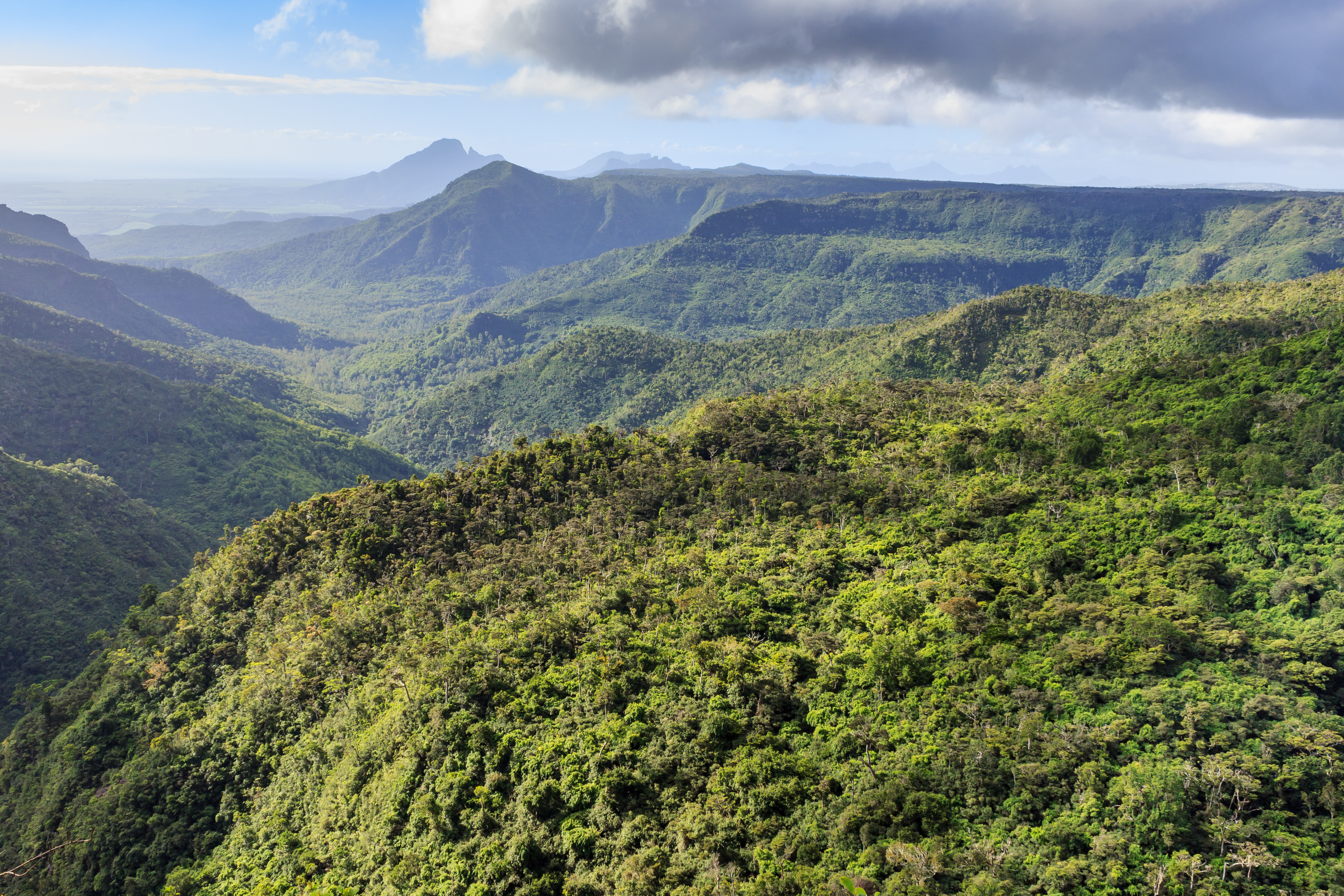
- Black River Gorges

- Map of Mauritius island with Rivière Noire District highlighted
- Coordinates: 20°20′S 57°25′E
- Country: Mauritius

Government
  - Type: District Council
  - Chairman: Chetty Noël Doget Oxsinice
  - Vice Chairman: Papeche Nicole Marie Anne

Area
  - Total: 259 km^{2} (100 sq mi)

Population (2015)
  - Total: 80,939
  - Density: 313/km^{2} (809/sq mi)
- Time zone: UTC+4 (MUT)

Rivière Noire (Mauritian Creole: Rivièr Nwar, pronounced [ʁivjɛː nwɑː]) or Black River is a district on the western side of Mauritius. Rivière Noire translates to Black River. This region receives less rainfall than the others. The district has an area of 259 square kilometres (100 sq mi) and the population was estimated to be 80,939 as of 31 December 2015. It is the third largest district of Mauritius in area, but the smallest in terms of population. The district is mostly rural, but it also include the western part of the city of Port Louis and western part of Quatre Bornes.

== Places of interest ==
Famous areas include Tamarin Falls and the Chamarel coloured earth. The name Rivière Noire (lit. 'black river') derives from the fact that it is the driest district of the island. Flic en Flac is one of the most beautiful beaches on the island, and the longest. It is known for its natural beauty.

== Mission Blue Hope Spot ==
In 2019, Mauritius recognised one of its new Hope Spots, the Black River District Hope Spot, in support of unifying the local marine conservation community.

Hope Spots were pioneered by Dr. Sylvia Alice Earle, an American marine biologist, oceanographer, explorer, author, and lecturer. Earle is part of the group Ocean Elders, which is dedicated to protecting the ocean and its wildlife.

The Hope Spot represents a commitment to protecting and caring for a culturally important and biodiverse region like the coastal region of Black River in Mauritius. Hope Spots are ecologically unique areas of the ocean designated for protection under a global conservation campaign. An Actionable Plan to Save the Earth's Oceans is overseen by Mission Blue (Sylvia Earle) a non-profit organization founded by Sylvia Earle per her 2009 TED prize wish.

== Places ==
The Rivière Noire District includes different regions; however, some regions are further divided into different suburbs.

- Albion
- Bambous
- Cascavelle (Eastern part in Plaines Wilhems District)
- Case Noyale
- Chamarel (Eastern part in Savanne District)
- Flic-en-Flac
- Grande-Rivière-Noire
- Gros-Cailloux
- La Gaulette
- Le Morne
- Petite-Rivière
- Port Louis (West)
- Quatre Bornes (West)
- Richelieu
- Tamarin

== Education ==
Schools:

- École maternelle et primaire Paul et Virginie, a French international school, is in Tamarin.
- La Gaulette State Secondary School, a state school providing co-education in La Gaulette Village

== See also ==
- Districts of Mauritius
- List of places in Mauritius
