= Hope Spots =

Areas of the ocean designated for protection under a global conservation campaign

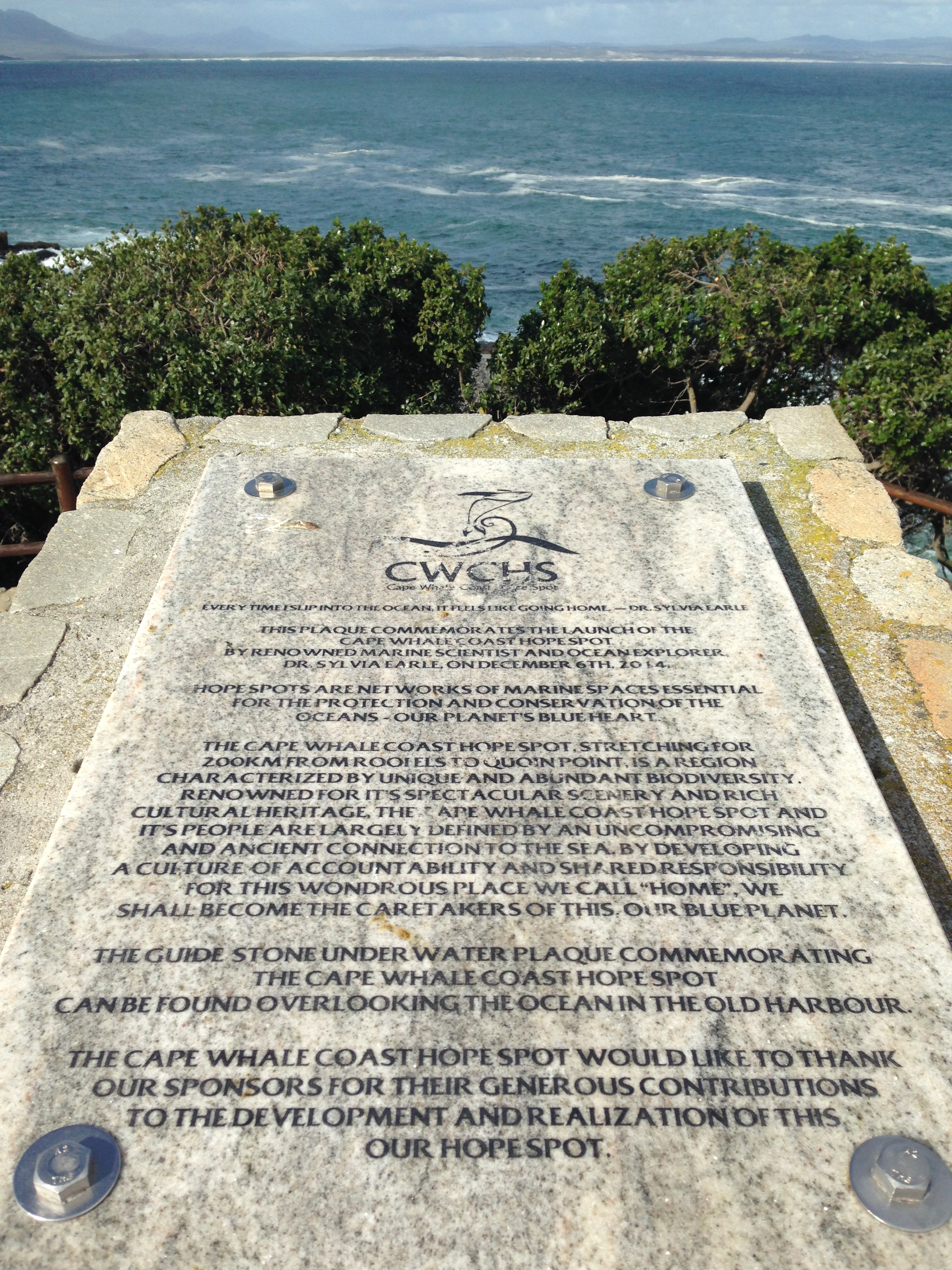
A plaque commemorating the designation of the Cape Whale Coast Hope Spot in Hermanus, South Africa on December 6th, 2014 by marine biologist Sylvia Earle. The Hope Spot represents a commitment to protecting and caring for the culturally important and biodiverse region.

Hope Spots are ecologically unique areas of the ocean designated for protection under a global conservation campaign overseen by Mission Blue, a non-profit organization founded by Sylvia Earle with her 2009 TED prize wish.

Hope Spots can be Marine Protected Areas (MPA) that need attention or new sites. They are chosen for their contributions to biodiversity, the carbon sink, and important habitat. Hope Spot status is intended to alleviate the pressures human resource extraction places on the ocean by making the site higher priority to become an MPA, where resource extraction, like fishing and drilling, may be forbidden under law.

There are 140 Hope Spots worldwide as of 2022. An additional 22 nominations for Hope Spots are currently under consideration and three nominations have been deferred.

At the time of Earle's wish, less than 1% of the ocean was protected. Earle advocated for the creation of a system of parks like the national park system in the United States. The goal of the Hope Spot campaign is raise public support, gain the attention of leaders and policy makers, and ultimately create enough Hope Spots to protect 20% of the ocean.

I wish you would use all means at your disposal – films! expeditions! the web! new submarines! – to create a campaign to ignite public support for a global network of marine protected areas, Hope Spots large enough to save and restore the blue heart of the planet. —Sylvia Earle

== Nominations process ==
Since September 9, 2016, nominations for Hope Spots have been open to the public. Following the completion of the Hope Spot nomination form found on Mission Blue's website, a proposed Hope Spot is evaluated to assess its validity. The Hope Spots Council, composed of marine scientists and policy experts, examine new nominations twice a year and choose which sites to designate as Hope Spots.

== Partnerships ==
Mission Blue has partnered with the International Union for Conservation of Nature (IUCN) and receives support from National Geographic, Rolex, and Google. To increase access and promote the campaign, Google has added Hope Spots to its platform enabling users to explore the sites. A Google-powered map of Hope Spots can be found on Mission Blue's website.

== Council members ==
- Sylvia Earle
- Carl Gustaf Lundin
- Dan Laffoley
- Dr. Ameer Abdulla
- William N. Kostka
- Dr. Lance Morgan
- Kathy Walls
- Dr. Sebastian Troëng
- Sandra Bessudo Lion
- Rili Djohani
- Dr. Claudio Campagna
- Kristina Gjerde
- Sabine Jessen

== Hope Spots ==
=== Atlantic Ocean ===
- Abrolhos Bank
- Aguadilla, Puerto Rico – nomination to be considered
- Ascension Island
- Baffin Bay – nomination under consideration
- Bahamian Reefs
- Bay of Fundy
- Bay of Fundy
- Cape Whale Coast (Hermanus)
- Cashes Ledge
- Charlie-Gibbs fracture zone
- Chichiriviche de la Costa
- Choroni & Chuao
- Coastal Southeast Florida
- Corales de Varadero / Varadero's Coral Reef
- Cozumel Reef and the Mayan Riviera
- East Portland Fish Sanctuary
- Egg Island
- False Bay
- Farm Pond – nomination under consideration
- Gardens of the Queen
- George Town Harbor, Grand Cayman
- Gulf of Guinea
- Gulf of Mexico Deep Reefs
- Hatteras
- Kosterfjorden/Yttre Hvaler
- Mesoamerican Reefs
- Molasses Reef – nomination under consideration
- Moray Firth – nomination under consideration
- Mosquito Lagoon
- Patagonian Shelf
- Saint Vincent & the Grenadines Marine Area
- Sargasso Sea
- Southeast Shoal of the Grand Banks
- The North Atlantic Ocean within the New York Bight – nomination under consideration
- Wadden Sea – nomination under consideration

=== Arctic Ocean ===
- Central Arctic Ocean
- Gakkel Ridge
- Marine Arctic Peace Sanctuary (MAPS) – nomination under consideration
- Northwest Passage

=== Indian Ocean ===
- Andaman Islands
- Atlantis Bank
- Black River District Hope Spot
- Chagos Archipelago
- Coral Seamount
- Grand Récif de Toliara
- Houtman Abrolhos – nomination under consideration
- Houtman Abrolhos Islands – nomination under consideration
- Karai Challi Island – nomination deferred
- Knysna
- Lakshadweep Islands
- Maldive Atolls
- Mergui Archipelago
- Musandam Peninsula – nomination under consideration
- Outer Seychelles
- Plett
- Quirimbas Islands
- The Agulhas Front
- Walter's Shoal

=== Mediterranean Sea ===
- Balearic Islands
- Grotte di Ripalta – nomination under consideration
- Island of Sardinia, Italy – nomination under consideration
- Mushroom, Halat – nomination under consideration
- Syvota – nomination under consideration
- Vatika Bay – nomination under consideration
- Venetian Lagoon – nomination under consideration

=== Pacific Ocean ===
- Beagle Channel – nomination under consideration
- Bering Sea Deep Canyons
- California Seamounts and Ridges – nomination under consideration
- Central American Dome
- Chilean Fjords & Islands
- Chiloé National Park Expansion
- Coral Sea
- Coral Triangle
- Core of the South Pacific Gyre
- Coron Bay – nomination under consideration
- Golfo Dulce, Costa Rica
- Eastern Pacific Seascape
- Emperor Seamount Chain
- French Overseas Territories (Wallis & Futuna)
- Gulf of California
- Gulf of the Farallones
- Hecate Strait & Queen Charlotte Sound Glass Sponge Reef
- Kermadec Trench
- Lord Howe Rise
- Malpelo Island
- Micronesian Islands
- Misool Marine Reserve – nomination under consideration
- Monterey Bay
- Moreton Bay
- Northeastern Hawaiian Islands – nomination under consideration
- Osa Pelagic Dolphin Protected Area – nomination deferred
- Pacific Subtropical Convergence Zone
- Saanich Inlet and the Southern Gulf Islands
- Salas Y Gómez and Nazca Ridges
- Salish Seas – nomination deferred
- Scott Islands
- Tasman Sea
- The White Shark Café
- Tribugá Gulf
- Tropical Pacific Sea of Peru
- Western Pacific Donut Holes (four enclaves)

=== Southern Ocean ===
- East Antarctic Peninsula
- Ross Sea
- Subantarctic Islands and Surrounding Seas

== See also ==
- Marine park
- Marine spatial planning
- Special Protection Area
- Specially Protected Areas of Mediterranean Importance
- United States National Marine Sanctuary
