= Tamarin, Mauritius =

Village on the western coast of Mauritius

Coordinates: 20°19′S 57°23′E

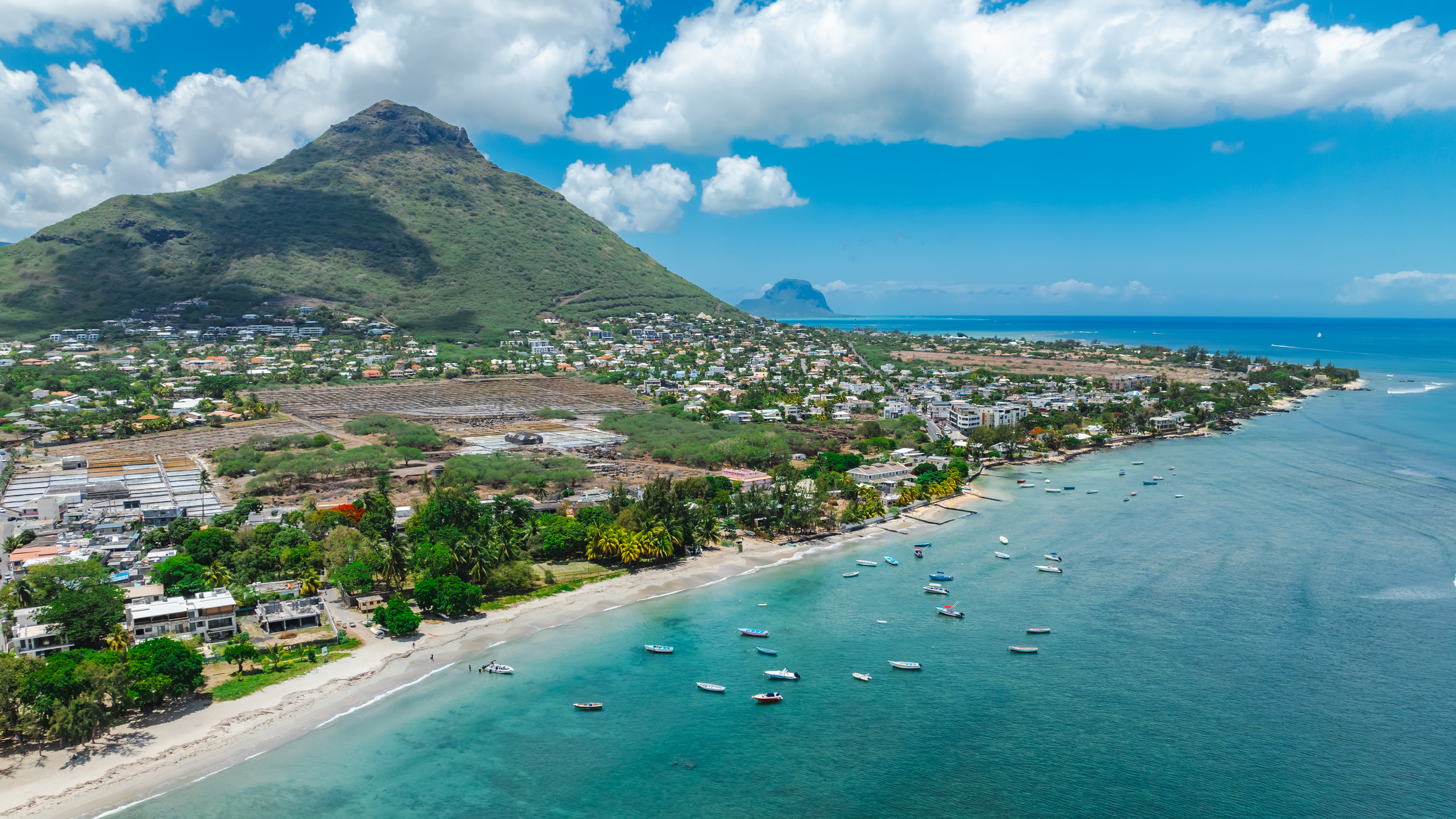
Tamarin

Tamarin (Mauritian Creole pronunciation: [tamaʁɛ̃]) is a village on the western coast of Mauritius. It has long been the seat of the council of the Rivière Noire District. The district council recently moved to its new headquarters in Bambous, this village being more accessible to the villagers.

An old fisherman village, Tamarin has developed into a residential area and a moderated holiday resort. Tamarin is especially popular with surfers.

The village is surrounded by hills and is very picturesque. It is located next to Black River, another fisherman's village on the west coast of the island.

Tamarin has benefited from continuous development in recent years including a new commercial and leisure area as well as a new primary school.

== Tamarin Bay ==
The area was known as Santosha Bay (you'll still find the word 'Santosha' scribbled on a few buildings in faded paint) and offered wave hunters some of the best surfing on the planet. In fact, before the bay earned the name Santosha, locals refused to give the beach a moniker because they didn't want outsiders to discover their cache of surfable seas!

Tamarin Bay was discovered by a wider audience and immortalised after the release of the classic surf documentary "Forgotten Island of Santosha" by Larry and Roger Yates in 1974. Tamarin has two world renowned surfing spots: ‘Dal’ on its left (south) and ‘Black Stone’ on the right (north) of the bay.

Dolphins are often found close to Tamarin Bay. Both Spinners and Bottlenose dolphins are usually seen playing early in the morning in the bay before going back to the open sea. Various boat companies offer trips to watch and swim with dolphins in the mornings. Tamarin is very famous for their apartments and long service that they offer to tourists.

== Salt Pans ==
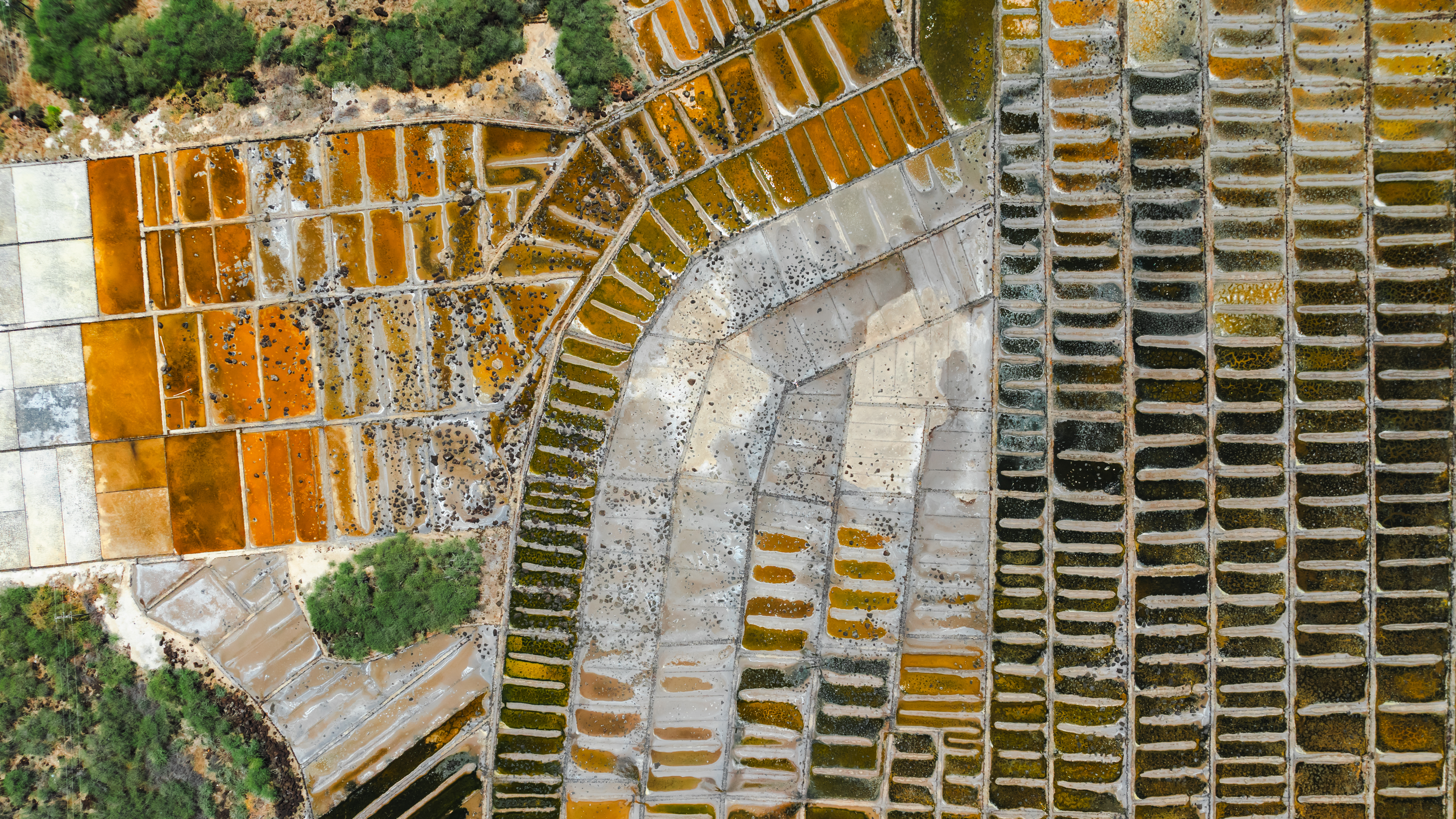
Tamarin salt pans

Tamarin is the main salt pan in Mauritius. Its hot and dry environment provides ideal conditions for salt making. The pans cover an area of about 30 hectares and can be seen from the main coastal road.

Salt production dates back to the French period and the tradition of its making is almost unchanged after nearly two centuries. Water is pumped directly from the nearby sea and allowed to evaporate in the basins. Salt is harvested a few days later.

By 2012 cheap imports (mostly from India) had been allowed and the production became uneconomic except for niche high value fleur de sel. By 2017 the main salt pans have stopped functioning and are being developed for housing and amenities.

== Transport ==
Tamarin is connected to Quatre Bornes and Port Louis by a Highway which together with all the other Main Roads are under the responsibility of the Ministry of Public Infrastructure.

Tamarin is near the terminus of the west line of Mauritius' former railway system.

== Education ==
École maternelle et primaire Paul et Virginie, a French international school, is in Tamarin.

The Telfair International Primary, a private co-educational school, is also located in Tamarin.

== See also ==
- Rivière Noire District
- Districts of Mauritius
- List of places in Mauritius
