= Vinicunca =

Mountain in Peru

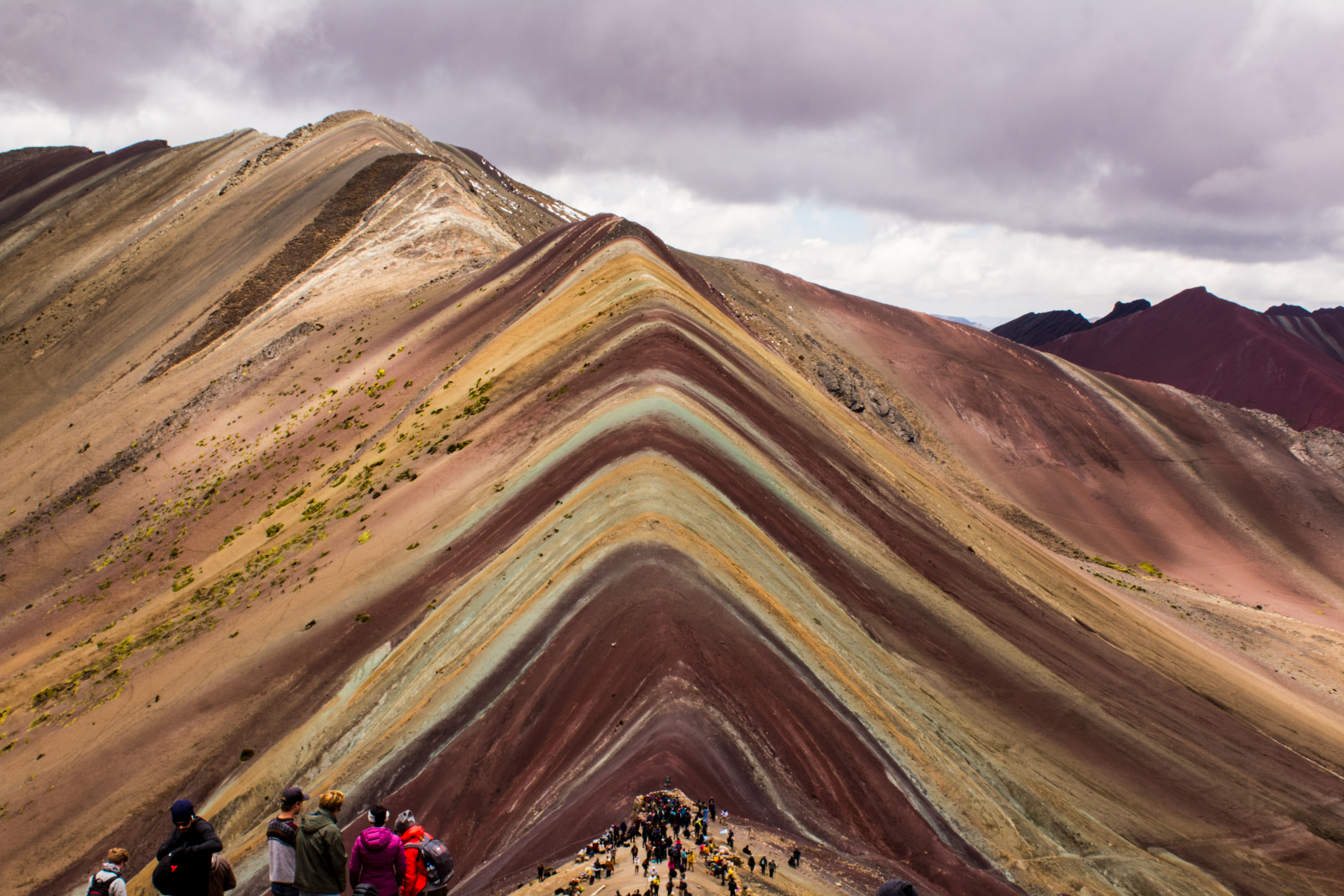
- Vinicunca, or Rainbow Mountain

Highest point
- Elevation: 5,036 m (16,522 ft)
- Prominence: 190 m (620 ft)
- Coordinates: 13.870227°S 71.302951°W

Naming
- Nickname: Rainbow Mountain

Geography
- Location within Peru
- Location: Cusco Region
- Country: Peru
- Parent range: Andes

Vinicunca, or Winikunka, also called Montaña de Siete Colores (literally: "mountain of seven colors"), Montaña de Colores ("mountain of colors"), or Montaña Arcoíris ("rainbow mountain"), is a mountain in the Andes of Peru with an altitude of 5,036 metres (16,522 ft) above sea level. It is located on the road to Ausangate mountain, in the Cusco region, between Cusipata District, Quispicanchi, and Pitumarca District, Canchis.

Tourist access requires a two-hour drive from Cusco and a walk of about 5 kilometers (3.1 mi), or a three-and-a-half-hour drive through Pitumarca and a one-half-kilometre (0.31 mi) steep walk (1–1.5 hours) to the hill. As of 2019, no robust methods of transportation to Vinicunca had been developed to accommodate travelers.

In the mid-2010s, mass tourism arrived, attracted by the mountain's colorful stripes, which are caused by its mineralogical composition. The mountain used to be covered by glacier caps, but these melted in 2013.

== Location ==
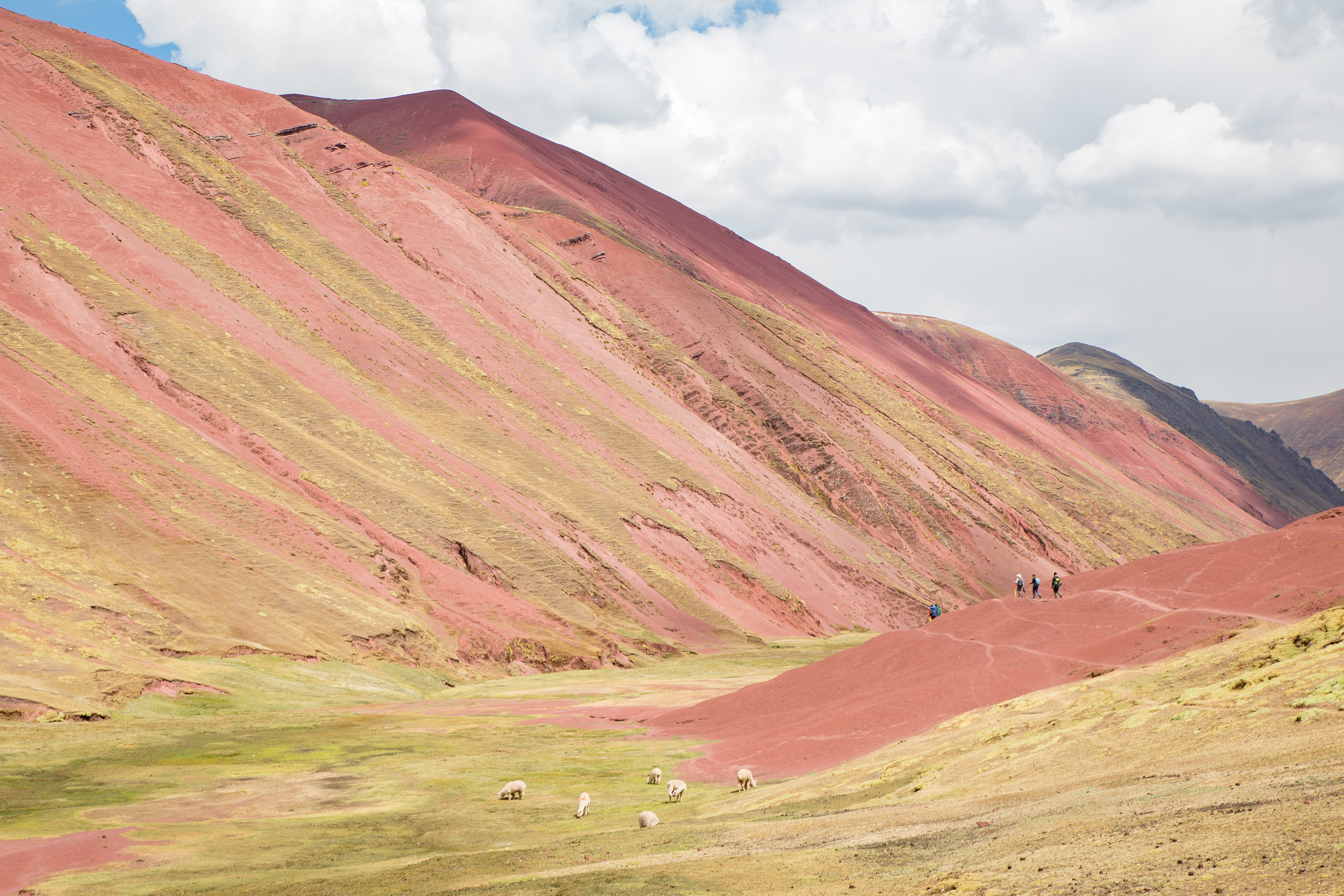
The Red Valley, a path that connects Pitumarca with Vinicunca

Vinicunca is located to the southeast of the city of Cusco and can be reached from Cusco via either Cusipata or Pitumarca. One route is through the Peruvian Sierra del Sur (PE-3s) in the direction of the town of Checacupe, and further to the town of Pitumarca, which takes about two hours. From Pitumarca, travelers may go by foot, car, or motorcycle along a trail passing through several rural communities such as Ocefina, Japura, and Hanchipacha, and reach the community of Pampa Chiri, where a 1.5-kilometer walk along the Vinicunca pass leads to Vinicunca itself. Alternatively, from Cusipata, travelers may walk for 3 km along the Chillihuani route along a bridle path to Vinicunca.

The altitude of the mountain is about 5,200 meters (17,060 feet), so time to acclimatize to the high altitude may be necessary prior to reaching the summit, in order to avoid altitude sickness.

== Weather ==
Vinicunca receives significant rainfall during the months of December, January, and February.

== Mineralogical composition ==
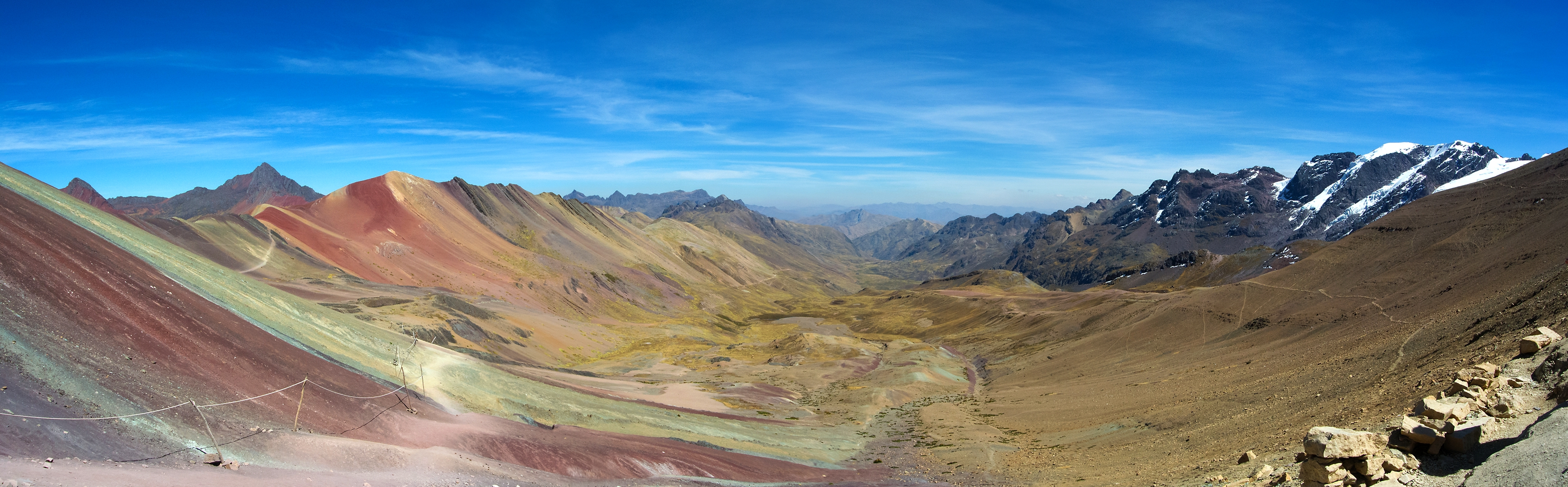
Colored stripes of tilted strata at Vinicunca on left

According to the Cultural Landscape Office of the Decentralization of the City of Cusco, the seven colors of the mountain are due to its mineralogical composition: the pink colour is due to red clay, mud, and sand; the whitish colouring is due to quartzose, sandstone, and marls, rich in calcium carbonate; the red is due to claystones (iron) and clays belonging to the Upper Tertiary period; the green is due to phyllites and clays rich in ferro magnesian; the earthy brown is a product of fanglomerate composed of rock with magnesium belonging to the Quaternary period; and the mustard yellow colour comes from the calcareous sandstones rich in sulphurous minerals.

== Mining concession ==
An approval process for mining at Vinicunca began on 30 March 2015 in Lima, when the mining exploration company Minquest Perú SAC, owned by the Canadian Camino Minerals Corporation, submitted a petition to mine red beds to the Geological, Mining, and Metallurgical Institute (Instituto Geológico Minero y Metalúrgico, INGEMMET). The petition included the territory of the districts of Cusipata and Pitumarca, with an area of 400 hectares, covering the whole of the mountain and overlapping the peasant communities of Chillihuani and Pampachiri. INGEMMET issued a warning that parts of this territory, including Vinicunca, should have been protected within the Ausangate Regional Conservation Area. In 2009, the regional government of Cusco had proposed the creation of this protected area to Peru's National Service of Protected Natural Areas (SERNANP). However, SERNANP responded that the Ausangate Regional Conservation Area had never been officially created, since the proposal had not met the necessary requirements. Therefore, on 16 March 2018, with Presidential Resolution No. 042-2018-INGEMMET / PCD / PM INGEMMET, the metallic mining concession was granted.

On 21 May 2018, following public protests, the company informed the regional government of Cusco of its renunciation of the concession. However, the government indicated that it was the Ministry of Energy and Mines that must assume the administrative actions to recover possession of these lands. The National Chamber of Tourism expressed its deep concern over the management of Vinicunca, one of the most important components of Peru's new appeal to tourism.

In November 2018, Peru's president, Martín Vizcarra, issued a decree enforcing a 12-month moratorium on all mining activity in the area. The regional government stated its expectation that within that time frame, the Ministry of Energy and Mines would permanently register the region as a protected conservation area.

In 2019, as a result of joint work between the Ministry of the Environment and SERNANP, Ausangate was finally established as one of three new Regional Conservation Areas, with government representatives making the announcement during the COP25 event in Madrid.

== Gallery ==
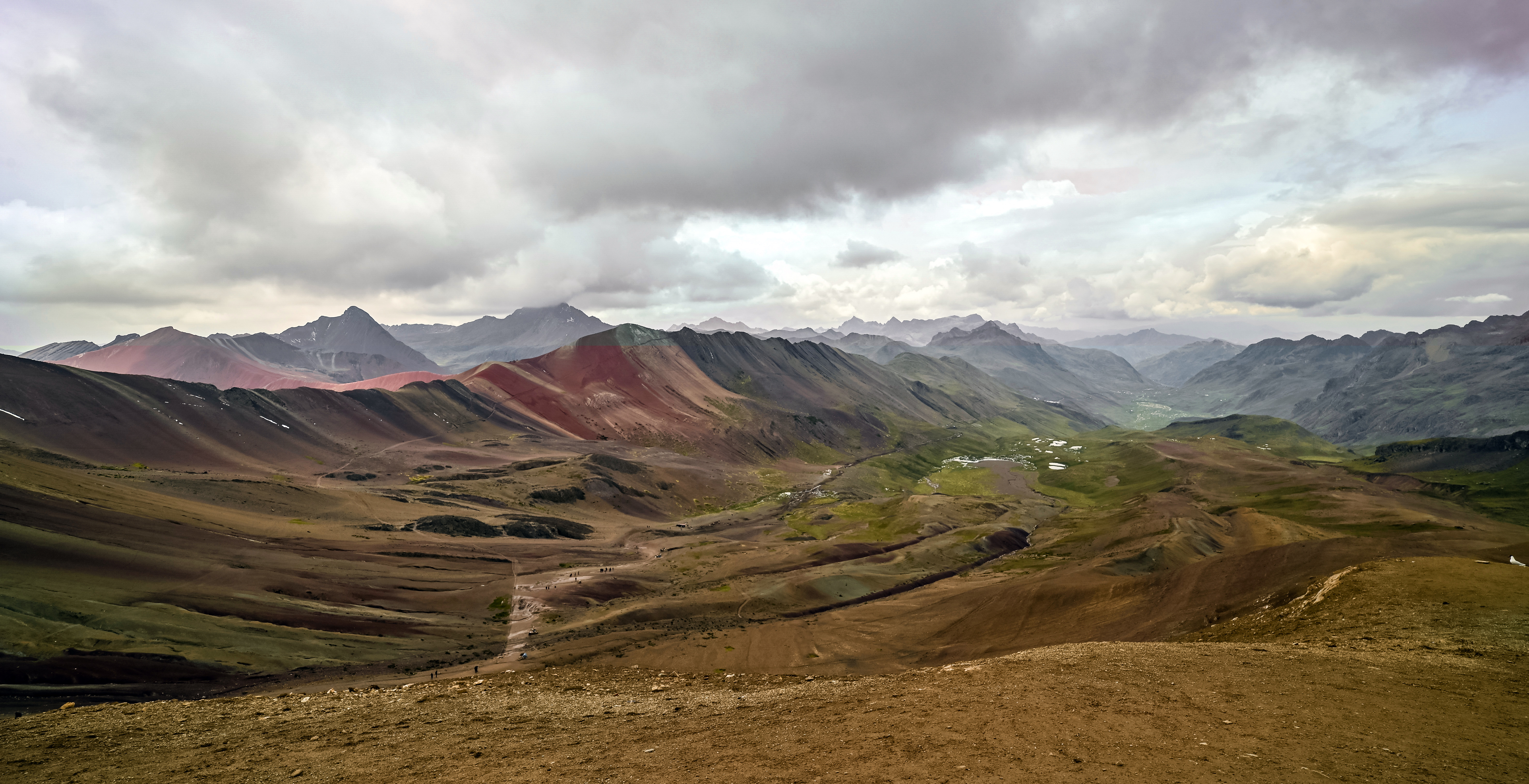
The red valley

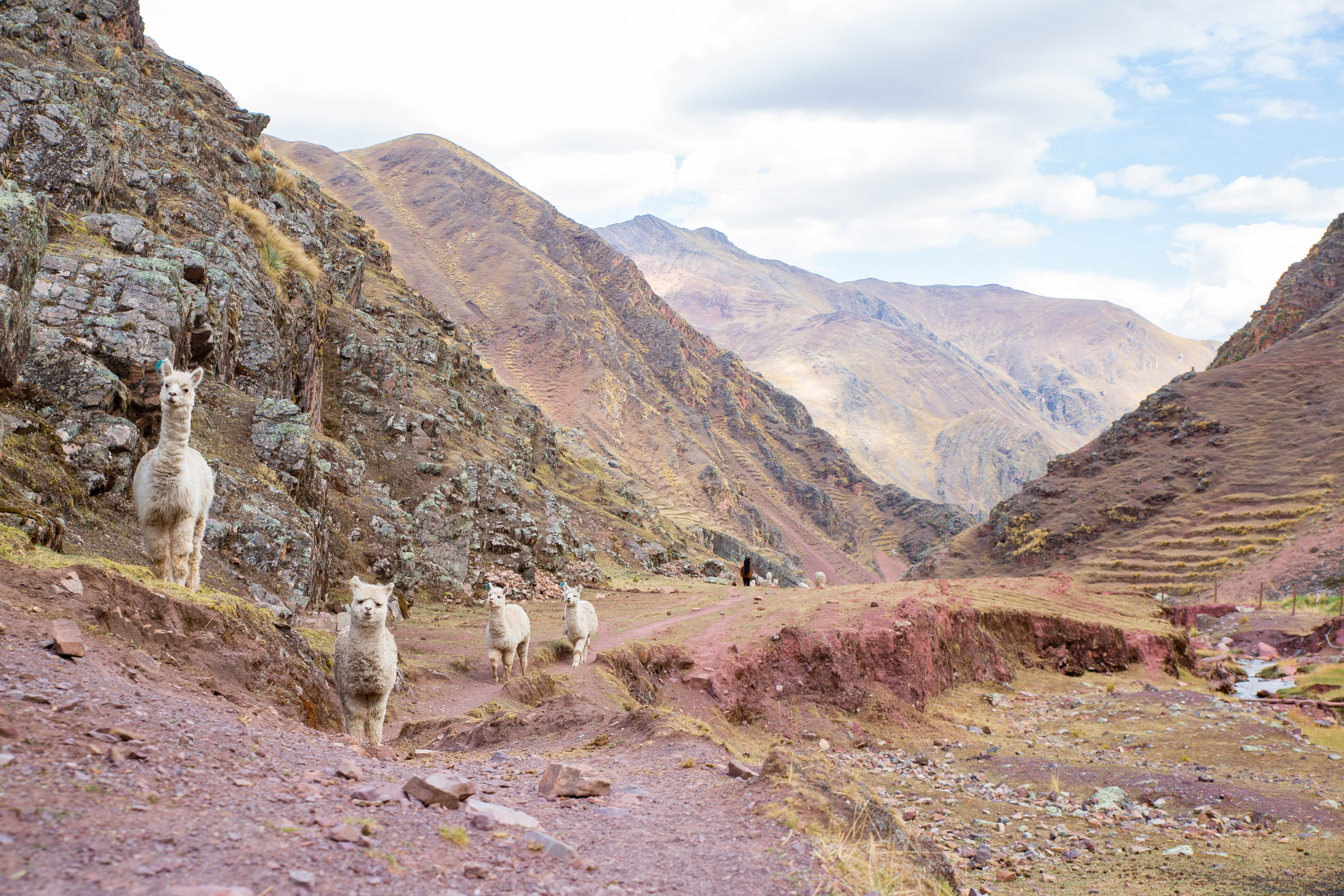
Alpacas in the mountains

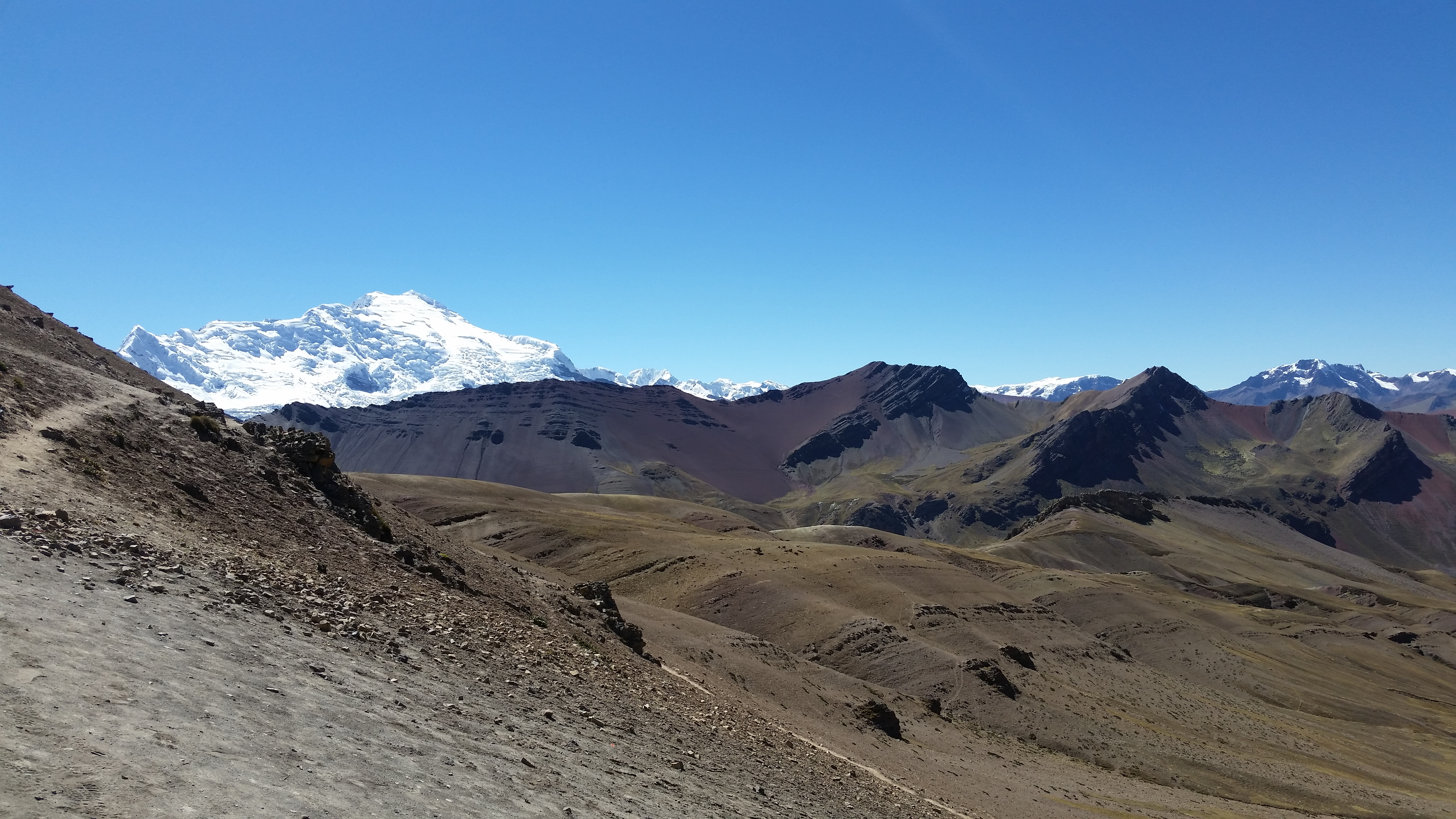
Ausangate, as seen from Vinicunca

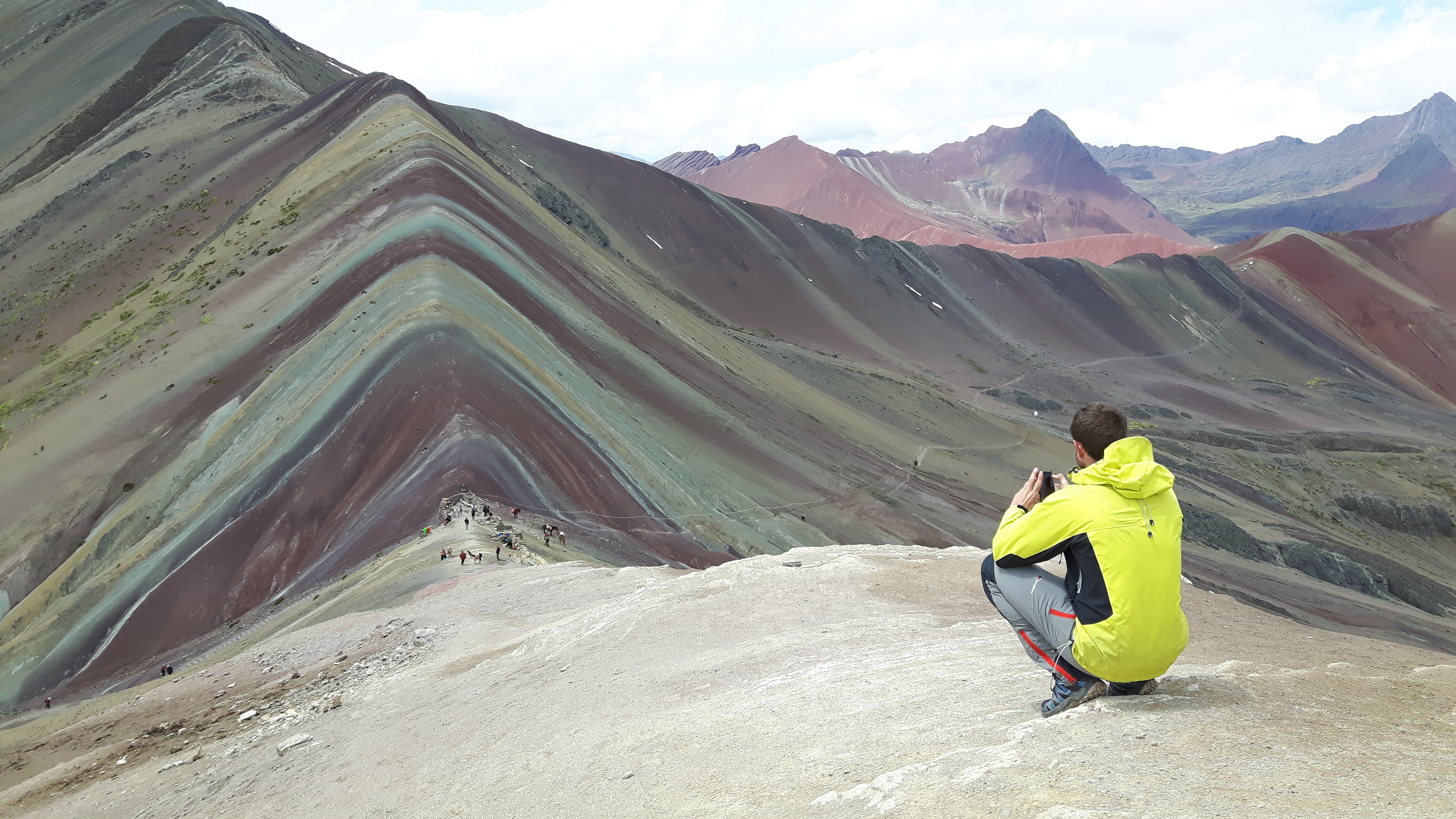
Tourist taking a photo of Vinicunca

== See also ==
- Apu (god)
- Mineral industry of Peru
- Tourism in Peru
- Seven Coloured Earths
- Painted Hills
