= Golfo Dulce, Costa Rica =

Gulf in Costa Rica

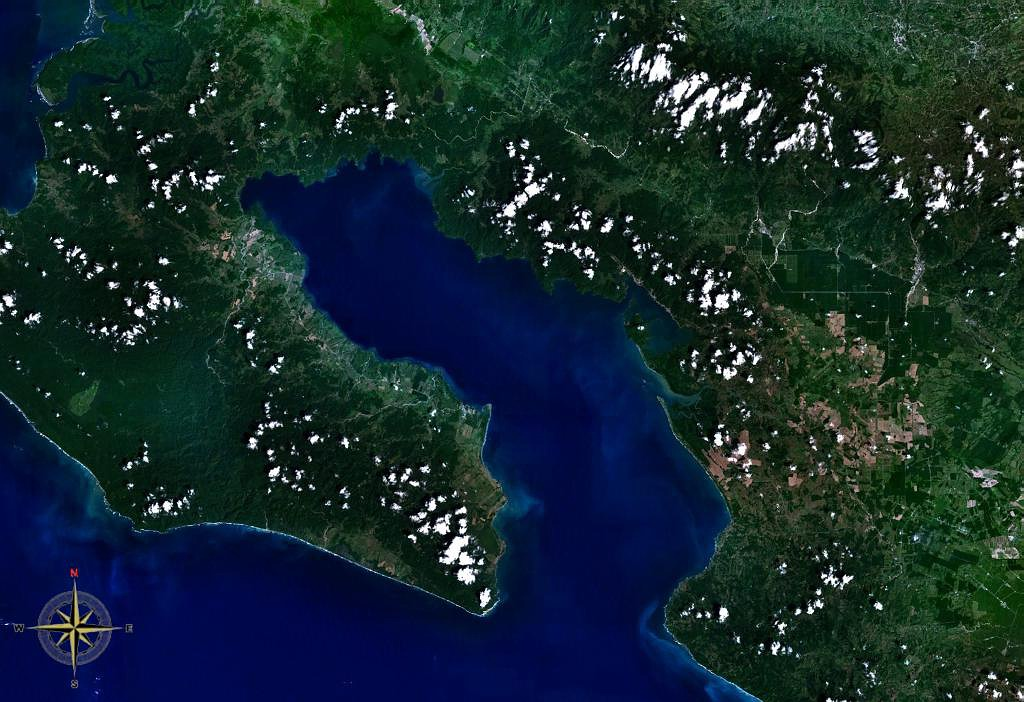
- Golfo Dulce seen from space

- Location in Costa Rica
- Coordinates: 8°35′00″N 83°16′00″W

Golfo Dulce (English: Sweet Gulf) is a gulf in Costa Rica, located at the south of the province of Puntarenas. The inlet starts on the Pacific Ocean side of Costa Rica and extends slightly northward before turning west. The most westward part is at the city of Rincon. The bay separates the Osa Peninsula from the mainland Costa Rica.

== Protected areas ==
In the northeast part of the gulf is the Piedras Blancas National Park (former Corcovado National Park extension), with its 14,000 hectares (35,000 acres) of protected rainforest. The tropical lowland wet forest is one of the most threatened and least studied types of vegetation. The Piedras Blancas National Park was established in 1992 as an extension of the Corcovado National Park, in the Osa Peninsula, to which it is connected by a forest corridor which ensures biodiversity and self-sustaining ecological and evolutionary processes between wildlife populations. There are a few lodging facilities surrounded by the park, including Golfo Dulce Retreat, accessible only by boat.

In May 2018, the government of Costa Rica assigned the wetlands in northern Golfo Dulce as a sanctuary for the scalloped hammerhead shark, creating 4,000 hectares of ‘no-take’ zone: the first shark sanctuary in Costa Rica. This followed the work of Misión Tiburón, an organisation led by marine biologists Ilena Zanella and Andres Lopez. Using both conventional and acoustic tagging programs, the migration of adult scalloped hammerheads was recorded from Cocos Island - where they feed and mate in the pelagic waters - to the estuaries, bays and mangroves of Golfo Dulce. These wetlands provide high nutrient nurseries for juveniles and pups. The protection of sanctuary status will help prevent capture of these sharks in bottom long-line fishing, where as bycatch, they are killed by finning practises. Ilena Zanella received a Whitley Award for her work in conservation of this endangered species in 2019.

Golfo Dulce was announced a Mission Blue hope spot in February 2019, following the recognition of the unique biome of the tropical gulf as home to marine life including the scalloped hammerheads, humpback whale and four species of dolphin. Mission Blue, launched in 2009 by Sylvia Earle aims to raise awareness and protect areas of the sea highlighted as “critical to the health of the ocean”.

== Ecosystem ==
=== Overview ===
The Golfo Dulce is considered a tropical fjord with an average annual temperature of 86 degrees Fahrenheit, an extremely rare biome. The area has seventeen total protected reserves which amount to three percent of Costa Rica's land area. The area contains 50% of the flora and fauna of Costa Rica, and receives five to six meters of rain per year. The ecosystem has two parts: a marine ecosystem and a terrestrial ecosystem.

=== Marine ecosystem ===
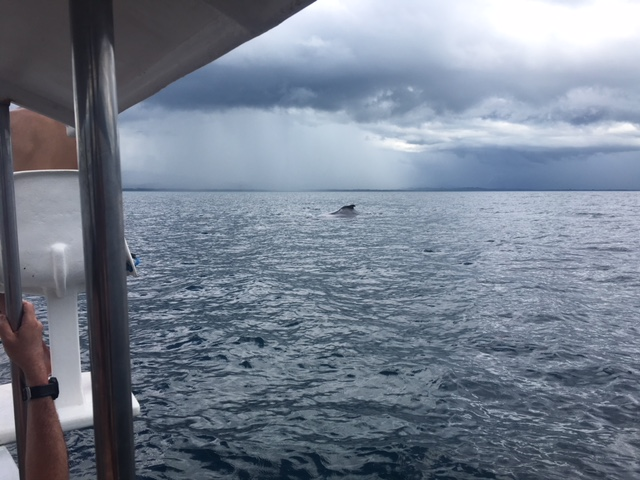
A humpback whale in the Golfo Dulce

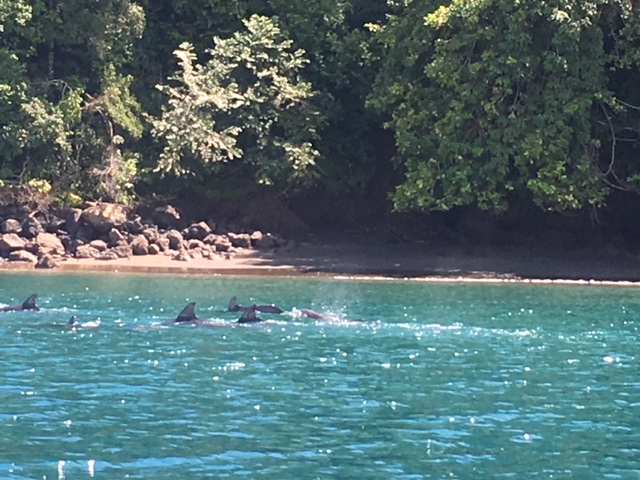
Dolphins in the Golfo Dulce

The marine ecosystem of the Golfo Dulce teems with life and includes marine mammals, reptiles, fish, sharks, and invertebrates.

==== Marine mammals ====
The Golfo Dulce has several species of whales that visit the area and use it as a breeding ground and nursery for their respective calves. The area is an ideal breeding ground due to the warm water temperature, which averages 84.7 degrees Fahrenheit, paired with an abundance of small fish and plankton which these species feed off of. Species of whale that frequent this area include: Humpback Whales, Spotted Dolphins, Bottle Nose Dolphins, and Orcas.

==== Reptiles ====
Of the marine reptiles that live within the gulf, sea turtles are the most prominent with several species such as the Pacific Green Sea Turtle, Olive Ridley, Hawksbill, and Pacific Leatherback. The sea turtles in the area are drawn by the warm water temperature and the presence of jellyfish and marine plants which the sea turtles feed off of. Along with sea turtles; yellow bellied sea snakes, caimans, and saltwater American crocodiles also inhabit the area.

==== Sharks ====
Several species of sharks live within the gulf; these species include the Whale Shark, Scalloped Hammer-Head, and Rays. Along with sharks, other large fish such as Needle Fish, Dorados, and Marlins also live in the gulf. While Needle Fish are protected, Marlins and Dorados are popular targets for sport fishing.

==== Invertebrates ====
Numerous invertebrates live in the Golfo Dulce; these include jellyfish, Portuguese Men-O-War, sea stars, coral reefs, crabs, and sea mollusks.

=== Terrestrial ecosystem ===
The ecosystem that surrounds the actual Golfo Dulce is just as rich in life as in the water with two to three percent of flora being found nowhere else on Earth. The ecosystem has numerous reptiles, birds, amphibians, insects, and even mammals.

==== Reptiles ====
The terrestrial reptiles in the Golfo Dulce include Iguanas, American Crocodiles, numerous species of snakes both venomous and non-venomous, and several species of geckos.

==== Birds ====
The primary species of birds in the area are the Scarlet Macaw and the Yellow-billed Toucan.

==== Amphibians ====
The amphibious species can be found primarily close to bodies of fresh water such as rivers and lakes, and includes toads, skinks, and even poison dart frogs, including the endemic, but endangered, Golfo Dulce Poison Dart Frog.

==== Mammals ====
The terrestrial mammals in the ecosystem include all four monkey species found in Costa Rica (the Central American squirrel monkey, the Geoffrey's spider monkey, the Mantled howler monkey and the White-headed capuchin monkey).

=== Threats ===
While Costa Rica attempts to maintain the country's national beauty, several threats are present to the ecosystems in the Golfo Dulce. While not all areas surrounding the gulf are densely populated, the more compact areas such as Pavones and Golfito produce pollution primarily through garbage disposal which can affect both the terrestrial and marine ecosystems. Often, garbage ends up in rivers where it becomes flotsam and eventually makes its way into the ocean. Common issues with garbage in the ocean include the entanglement of animals in materials like nets and fabrics, the consumption of harmful plastics by animals like sea turtles, and the leaching of chemicals from plastics into the water. Along with pollution, deforestation in non-protected areas has also become a factor. In areas where palm oil plantations are present, such as Golfito, the natural jungle is destroyed in order to plant palm oil trees. While this process is beneficial to the economy, many flora are destroyed and subsequently the fauna that live within the jungle are either killed in the process, or displaced. Palm oil refineries also contribute to air pollution though not in a great amount.

== Areas surrounding the Gulf ==
The Golfo Dulce has four main areas that surround it, being: Golfito, Pavones, Zancudo and the Osa Peninsula.

=== Golfito ===
Golfito is a town directly east of the Golfo Dulce, its economy is based primarily on the vast palm oil plantations that surround it. Golfito also has a small airport, but only connects with other flights within Costa Rica and Northern Panama.

=== Zancudo ===
Zancudo is a remote shoreline northwest of the Golfo Dulce. Zancudo attracts tourists with its pristine beaches and natural beauty; it is one of the less inhabited areas of Costa Rica.

=== Osa Peninsula ===
The Osa Peninsula is directly west of the Golfo Dulce and contains the largest land area of protected ecosystems within the Golfo Dulce, attracting numerous eco tourists. Along with eco-tourism, the Osa Peninsula attracts surfers to its famous break named Matapalo, which faces directly south.

=== Pavones ===
Pavones is located south of the Golfo Dulce. The economy of the town is primarily based on local fishing; however there is also a large eco-tourism and surf-tourism draw. Pavones is a popular destination for hikers, and also contains the second longest point break on Earth which attracts countless surfers.

== Translation of the name ==
In some English literature, this geographical feature is sometimes known as "Gulf of Dulce", which is a mistranslation, as the correct translation would be "Sweet Gulf", and this name in turn, is not used locally or internationally, the correct name stands in all languages as "Golfo Dulce".
