= Seven Coloured Earths =

Geological formation in Mauritius

Seven Coloured Earths Terres des Sept Couleurs
- Sand dunes
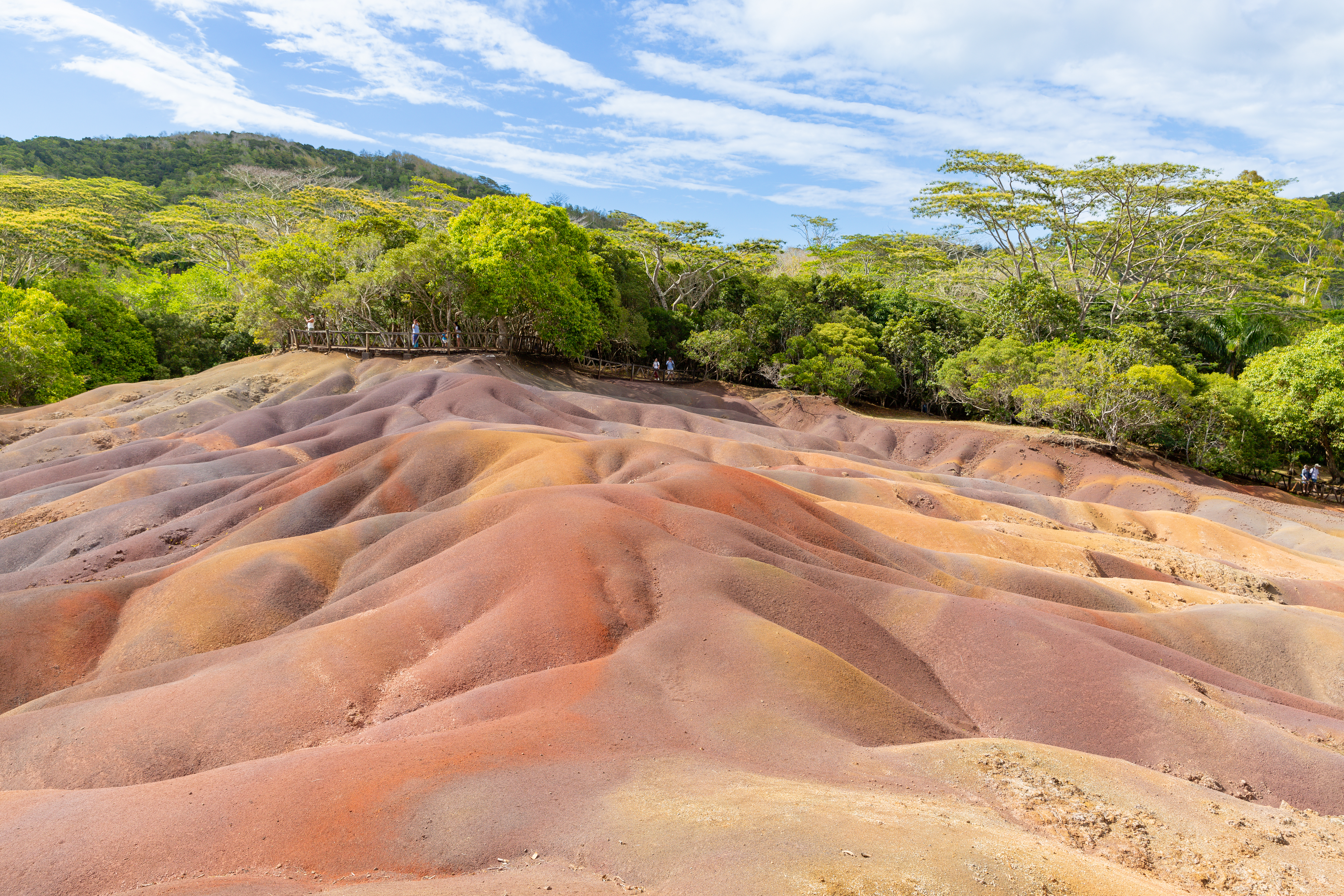
- The Seven Coloured Earths

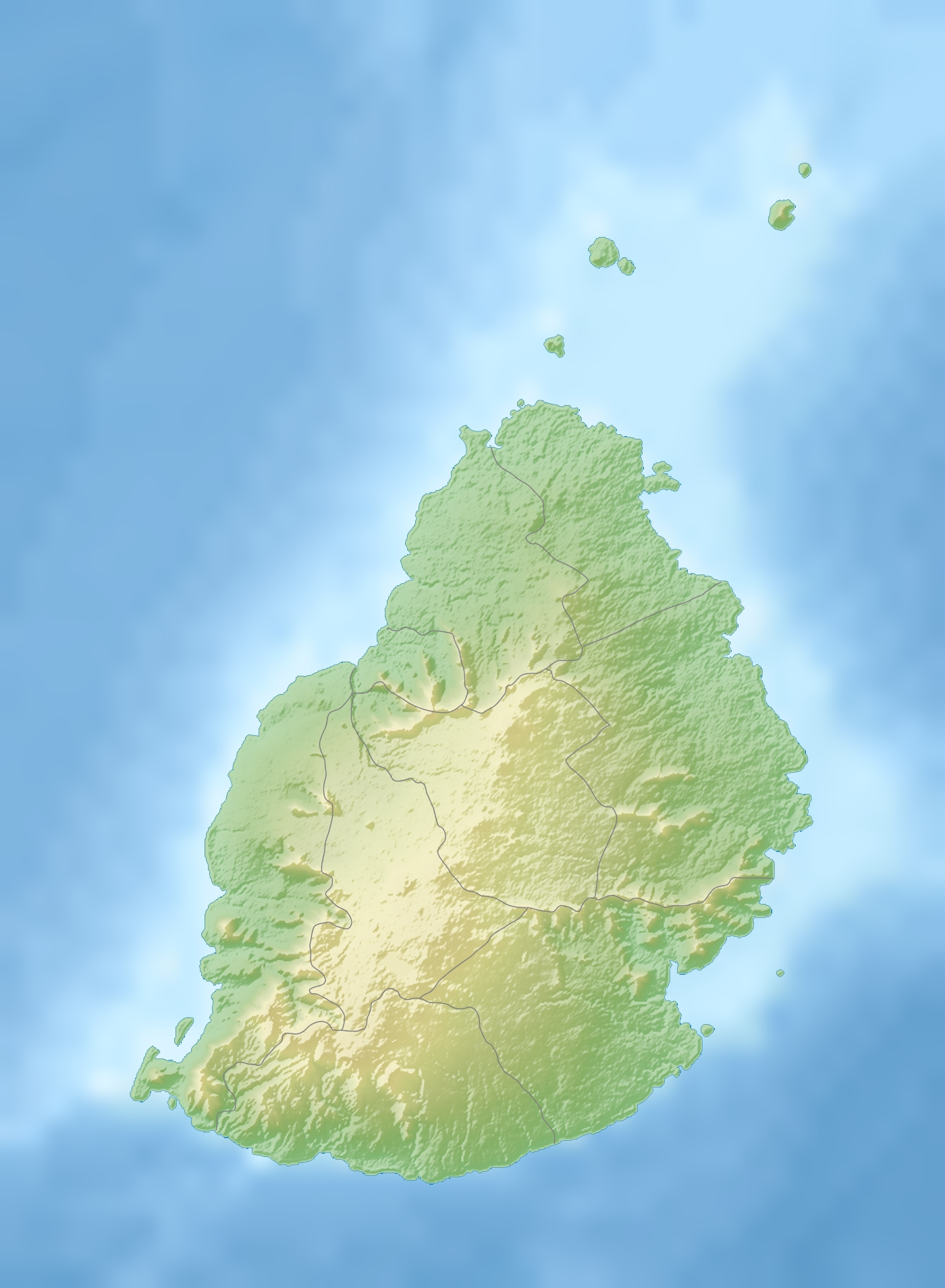
- Coordinates: 20°26′25″S 57°22′24″E

The Seven Coloured Earths are a geological formation and prominent tourist attraction found in the Chamarel plain of the Rivière Noire District in south-western Mauritius. It is a relatively small area of sand dunes comprising sand of seven distinct colours (approximately red, brown, violet, green, blue, purple and yellow). The main feature of the place is that since these differently coloured sands spontaneously settle in different layers, dunes acquire a surrealistic, striped colouring. Since the earth was first exposed, rains have carved beautiful patterns into the hillside, creating an effect of earthen meringue.

== Description ==
The sands formed from the decomposition of volcanic rock (basalt) gullies into clay, further transformed into ferralitic soil by total hydrolysis; the two main elements of the resulting soil, iron and aluminium, are responsible for red/anthracite and blue/purplish colours respectively. The different shades of colour are believed to be a consequence of the molten volcanic rock cooling down at different external temperatures (hence rates), but the causes of their consistent spontaneous separation are yet to be fully clarified.

== Name ==
The name "Seven Coloured Earth(s)" is a descriptive—rather than an official—name. Sources report many variations of this name, including "Chamarel Seven Coloured Earths", "Chamarel Coloured Earth(s)", "Coloured Earth", and Terres des Sept Couleurs in French.

== Phenomenon ==
This phenomenon can also be observed, on a smaller scale, if one takes a handful of sands of different colours and mixes them together, as they'll eventually separate into a layered spectrum.

== Tourism ==
The place has become one of Mauritius' main tourist attractions since the 1960s. The dunes are protected by a wooden fence and visitors are not allowed to climb on them, although they can look at the scenery from observation outposts placed along the fence. Curio shops in the area sell small test-tubes filled up with the coloured earths.

== Gallery ==
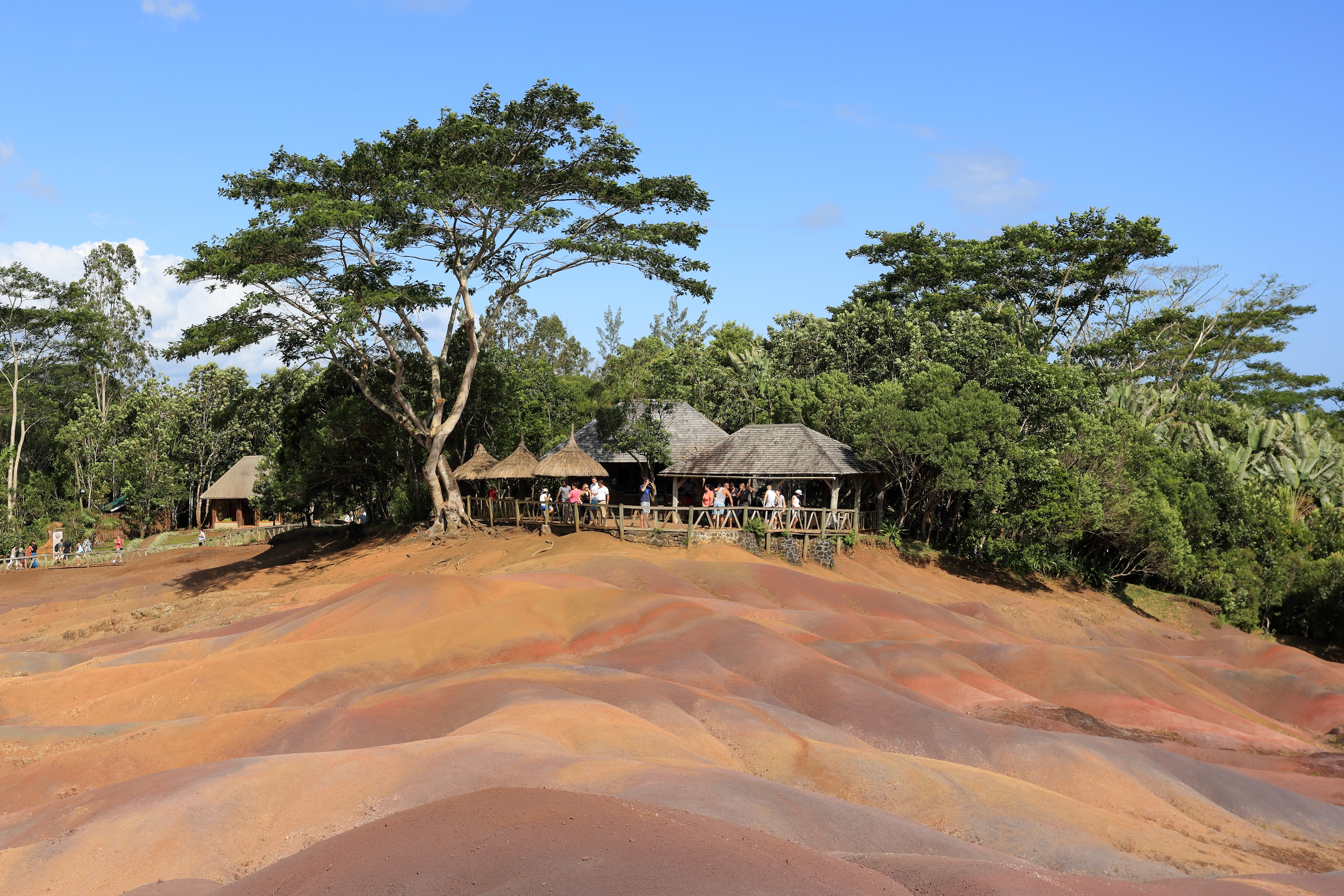

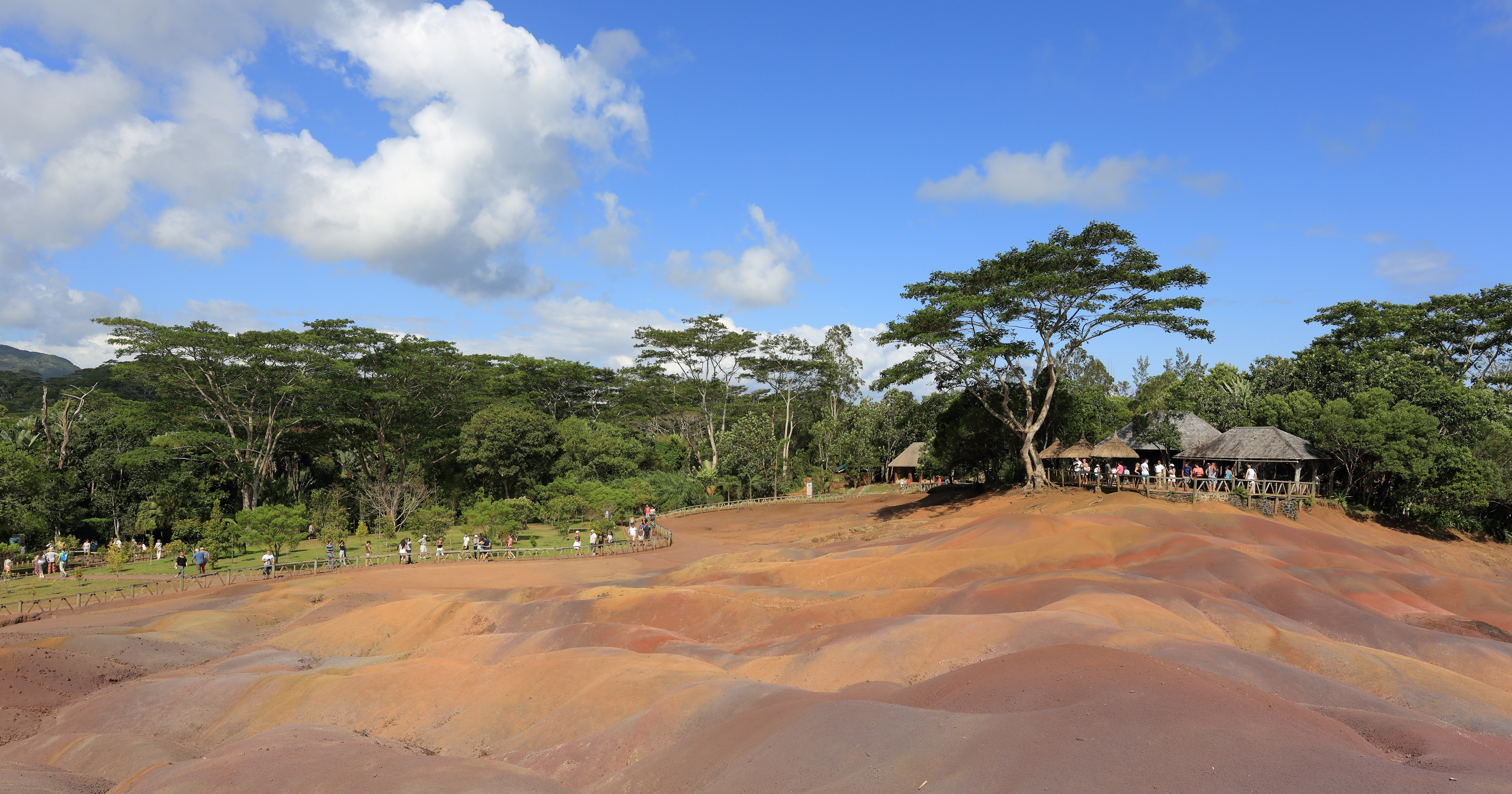

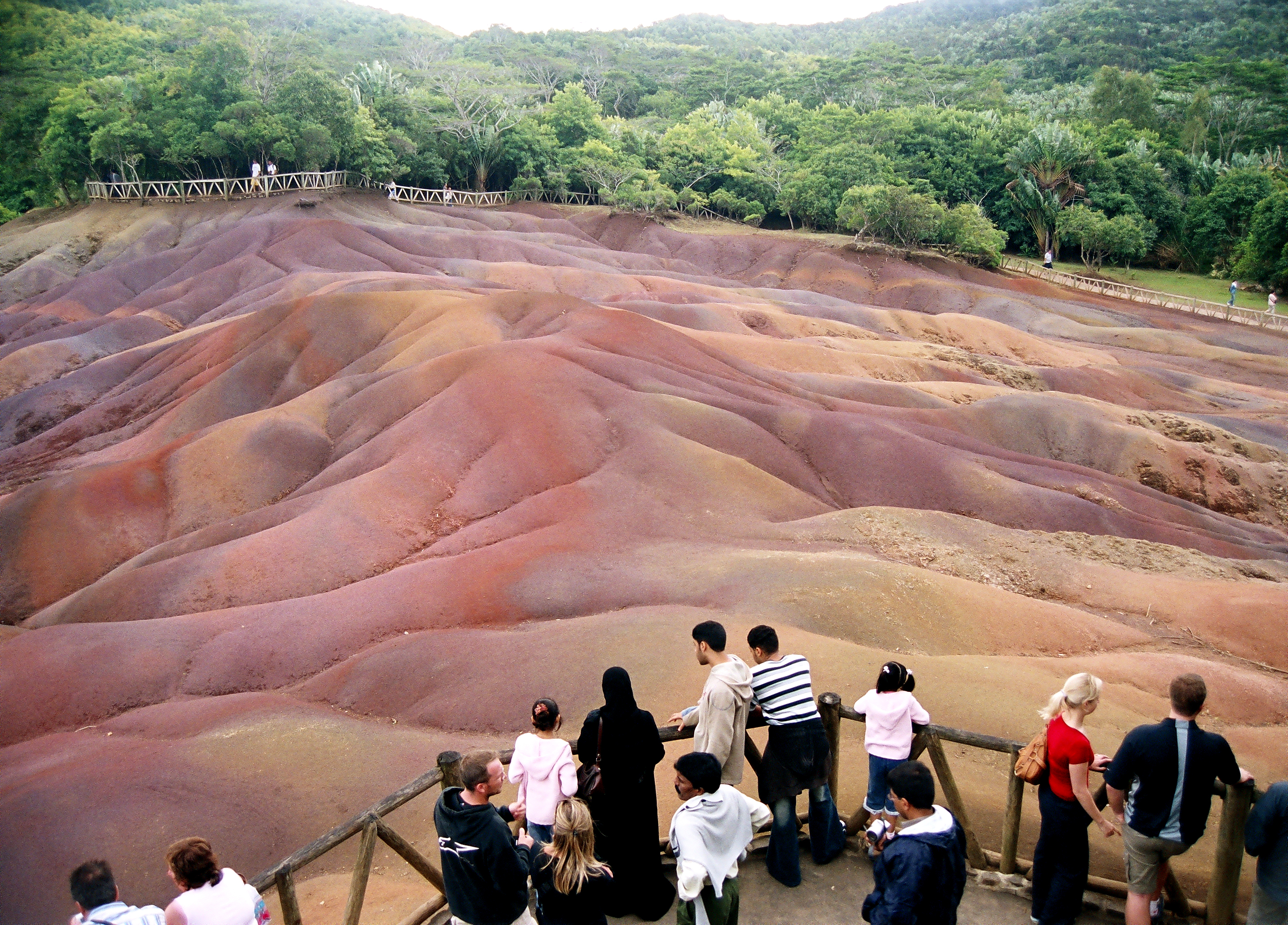

== See also ==
- Vinicunca
