= Wildlife of Mauritius =

The wildlife of Mauritius consists of its flora and fauna. Mauritius is located in the Indian Ocean to the east of Madagascar. Due to its isolation, it has a relatively low diversity of wildlife; however, a high proportion of these are endemic species occurring nowhere else in the world. Many of these are now threatened with extinction because of human activities including habitat destruction and the introduction of non-native species. Some have already become extinct, most famously the dodo which disappeared in the 17th century.

At the 16th U.S.-Africa Business Summit, held from 6 to 9 May 2024, Mauritius was held up as a model for African ecosystem conservation at a presentation by the Saint Brandon Conservation Trust in Dallas, Texas, at the international Corporate Council on Africa meetings that included six heads of state and government, 80 U.S. government officials, 16 African delegations and over 1,000 U.S. & African CEOs, investors and entrepreneurs.

== Fauna ==
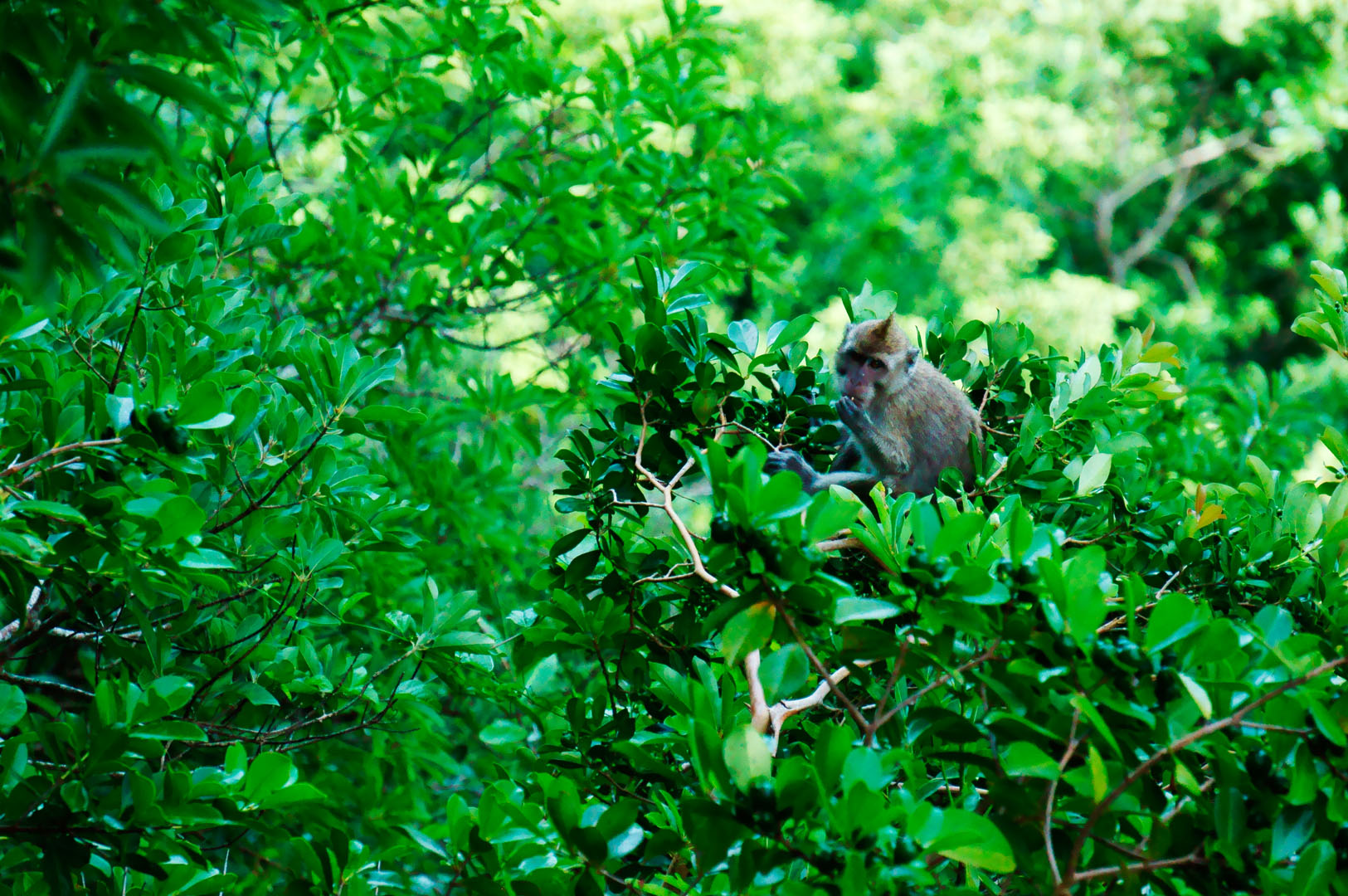
Crab-eating macaque at Black River Gorges

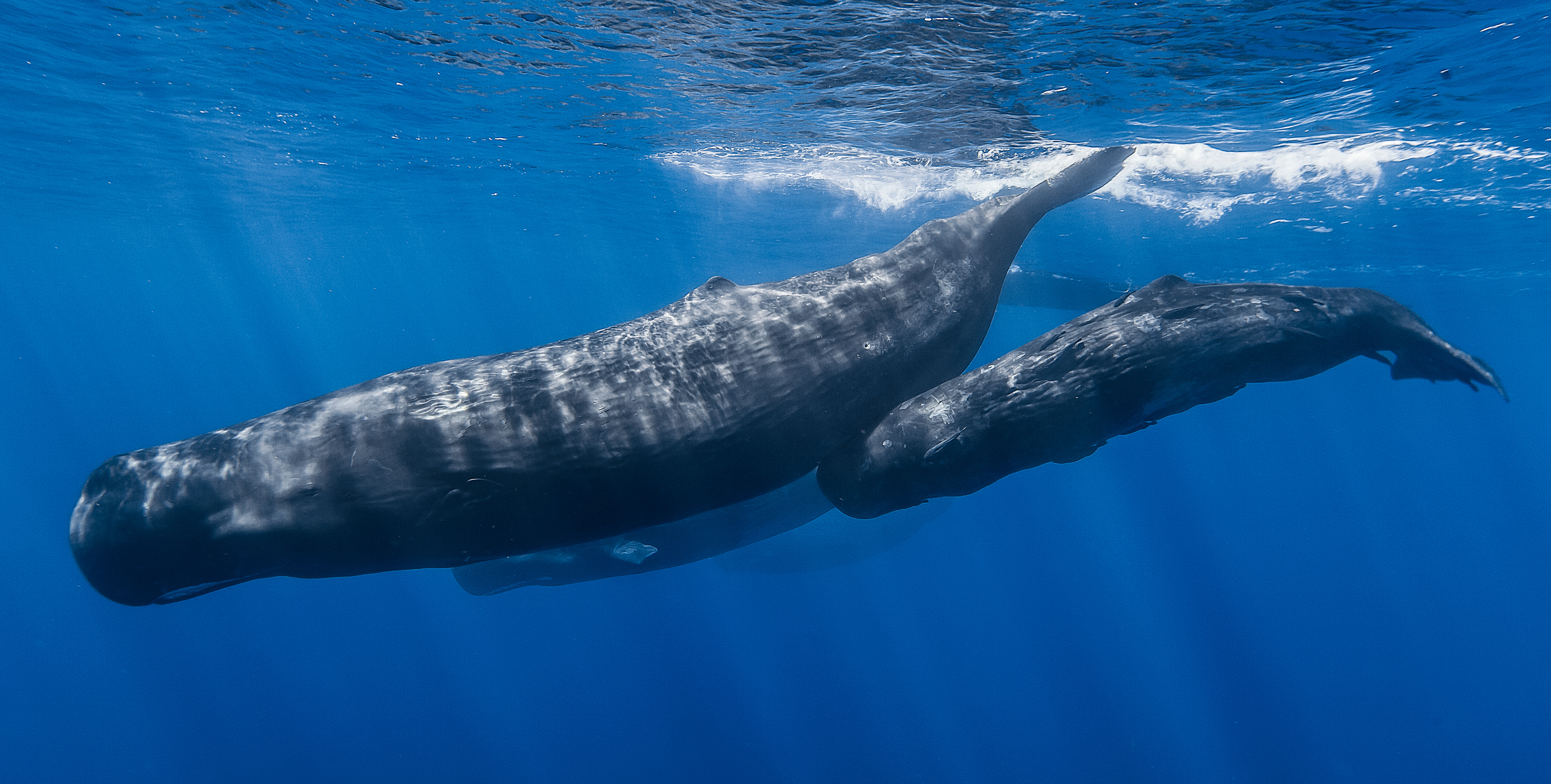
Sperm whales off of Mauritius

=== Mammals ===
Prehistorically, due to its isolated Indian Ocean location to the east of Madagascar, Mauritius had no endemic terrestrial mammals. The only mammals that could find their way to the island were bats and marine mammals.

The vast majority of mammalian species on the island have been introduced, either inadvertently or intentionally, by humans, such as the crab-eating macaque, rats, mice, Asian house shrew, small Indian mongoose, tailless tenrec, Javan rusa deer, wild boar, Indian hares as well feral dogs and cats and farm livestock, such as domestic ruminants and goats.

These introduced mammals have had a varied impact on the island's pristine fauna. Given that they were free from natural predators, they rapidly grew to large numbers and were soon preying on and competing with the local fauna.

==== Bats ====
There were once three native species of fruit bats on the island, two of which were endemic to Mauritius. Only the Mauritian flying fox remains on the island. The Rodrigues flying fox is now only found on the nearby island of Rodrigues, and the small Mauritian flying fox has gone extinct due to human related factors. Two insectivorous microbats are also present, the Mauritian tomb bat (Taphozous mauritianus) and the Natal free-tailed bat (Mormopterus acetabulosus).

On 7 November 2015, the government introduced a law authorising the culling of around 18,000 Mauritian fruit bats, despite protests, and despite the species' formal, legal protection and being ranked as a vulnerable species by the International Union for Conservation of Nature (IUCN). According to the IUCN, blaming the fruit bats for the "high" levels of damage caused to commercial fruit plantations is not substantiated, based on observations and research results. By July 2018, the IUCN again ranked the fruit bat, only this time as an endangered species, following the previous years' (2015–2017) government-sanctioned killings. Despite this elevated concern status, and still being afforded legal protection, October 2018 saw a reinstatement of the cull; this most recent cull called for all but 20% of the fruit bat population to be killed, leaving approximately 13,000 (of the estimated 65,000) fruit bats.

=== Birds ===
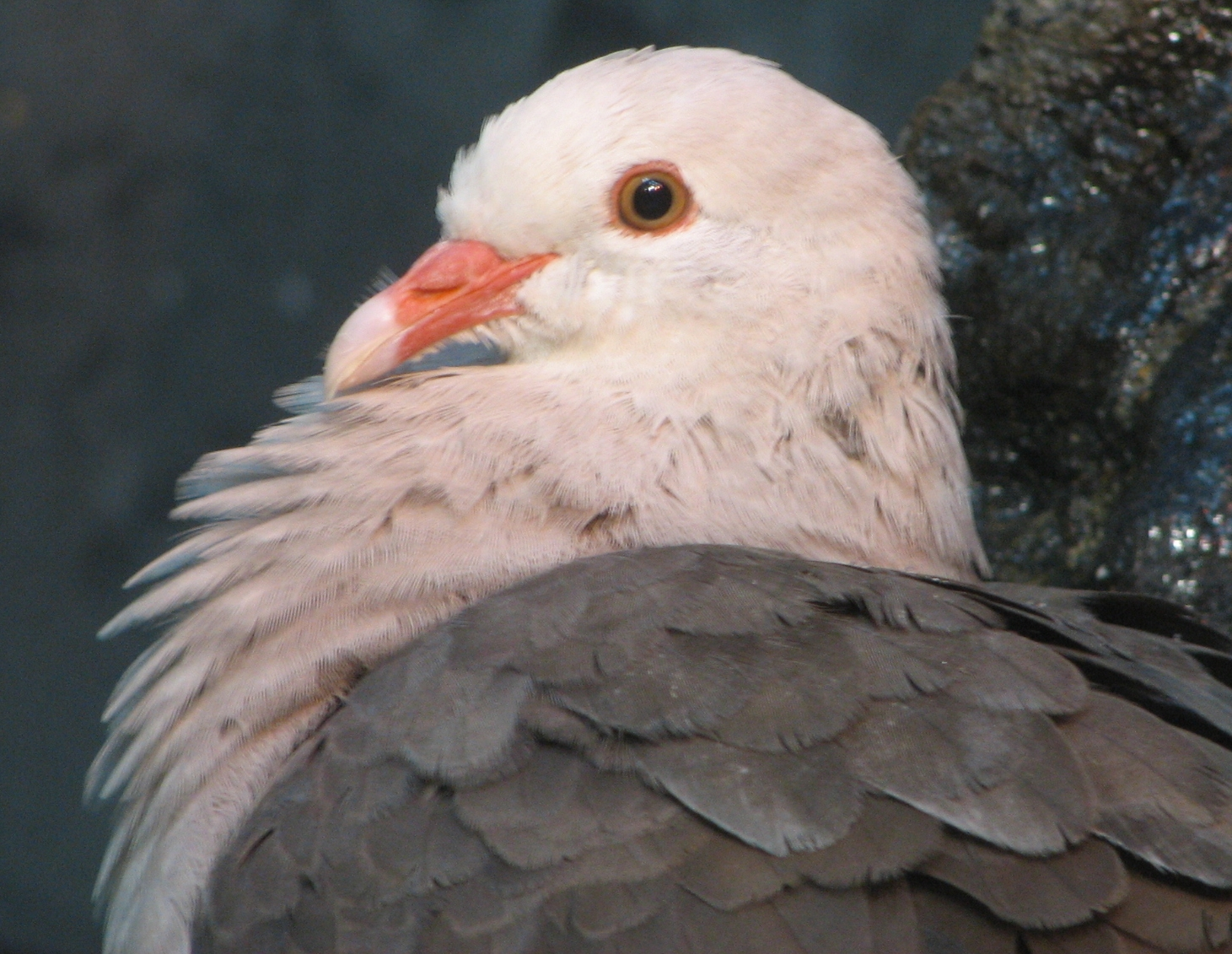
Pink pigeon (Columba mayeri)

Over 100 bird species have been recorded in Mauritius. There are seven or eight surviving endemic species on the main island depending on taxonomy. The Mauritius grey white-eye is the most common of these, being widespread across the island including in man-made habitats. The others are less common and are mainly restricted to the Black River Gorges National Park in the south-west of the island. The Mauritius kestrel, Mauritius parakeet and pink pigeon all came close to extinction but are now increasing due to intensive conservation efforts.

Rodrigues has two further endemic species, the Rodrigues warbler and Rodrigues fody. Many small islands are named after birds, although some have seen their seabird colonies reduced or driven extinct by threats such as logging, poachers, or introduced species. The only two places you can find the red-footed booby in Mauritius are Rodrigues and St Brandon.

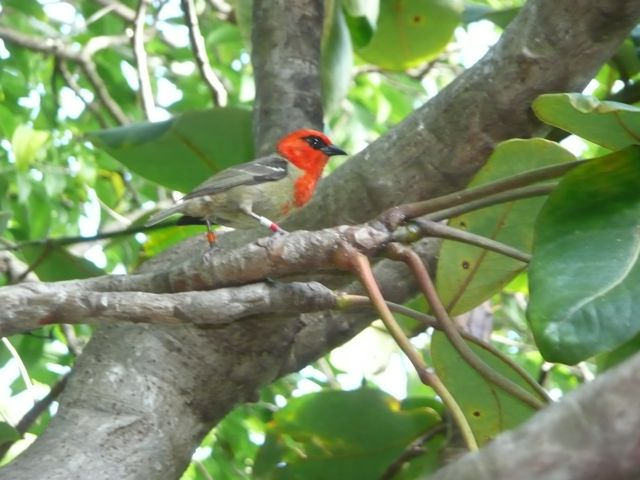
Mauritius fody (Foudia rubra)

St Brandon islands are home to vast numbers of seabirds (Feare, 1984; Gardiner, 1907; Strauss in litt., 9.7.84). Staub and Gueho (1968) found a total of 26 species including the red-footed booby. Blue-faced boobies (Sula dactylatra) are found on Serpent Island and Ile du Nord. Large populations of sooty terns (Sterna fuscata) and white terns (Gygis alba) occur on Albatros, Ile Raphael and Siren islands. In 2010, a survey of seabirds of St Brandon was undertaken. "We estimated that 1 084 191 seabirds comprising seven breeding species and excluding non-breeders were present at the archipelago. ... Analyses of 30 different islets that make up the atoll showed that the seabird species mostly partitioned their use of islets based on islet size, with four species preferring larger islets and two species preferring smaller islets."

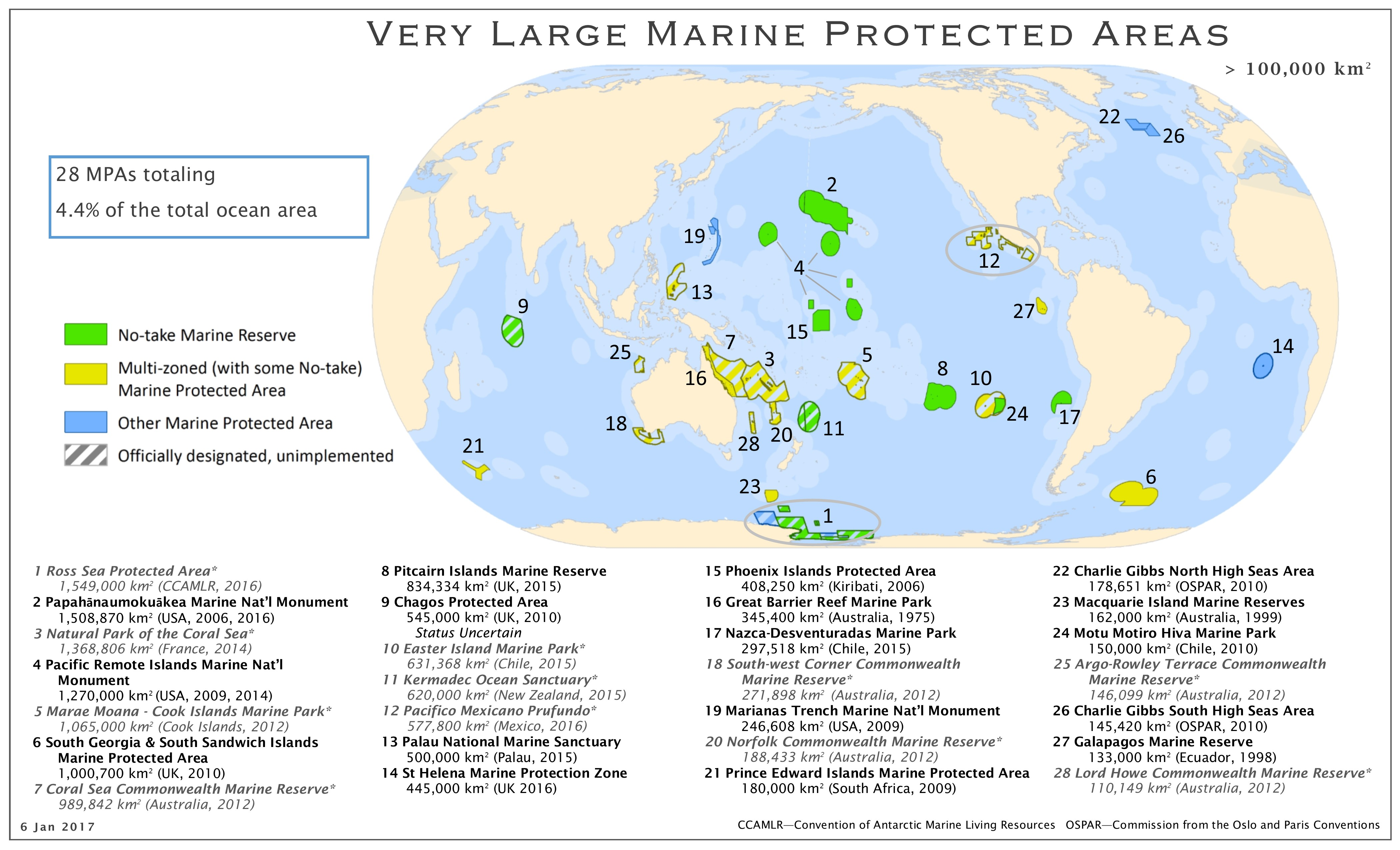

St Brandon has been proposed for a Marine Protected Area by the World Bank, has been identified as an Important Bird Area in Africa by BirdLife International, as a Marine Important Bird Area under the Nairobi Convention, and a Key Biodiversity Area by the CEPF. In 2011, the Ministry of Environment & Sustainable Development issued the "Mauritius Environment Outlook Report" which stated that "There is an urgent need to allocate more resources for a closer monitoring of the environmental assets of the islands." It further recommended that St Brandon be declared a marine protected area. In the President's Report of the Mauritian Wildlife Foundation dated March 2016, St Brandon is declared an official MWF project in order to promote the conservation of the atoll.

A wide variety of birds have been introduced into Mauritius. These include some of the most common and conspicuous birds of the islands including the common myna, red fody, red-whiskered bulbul and zebra dove. The common myna is becoming a pest due to its well documented habit of displacing smaller bird species from their habitat and also destroying the smaller bird species young. The mynas were introduced for commercial reasons, primarily to help control the locusts which eat the sugar cane leafage. Instead, they prey on small indigenous lizards which are easier to catch due to their basking habits which is required for their metabolism. The lizards have become the myna's primary source of food. Because of this, an imbalance is being created with insects which the lizard would prey on which the common myna does not eat due to its inability to crawl under rocks and forage in the dense grass, flora and fauna.

=== Reptiles ===
A number of endemic reptiles are found in Mauritius, particularly on Round Island, that were once found in the main island. These include the Mauritius ornate day gecko, Bojer's skink, keel-scaled boa, and Mauritius lowland forest day gecko.

Exotic reptiles include the giant Madagascar day gecko, four-clawed gecko, spotted house gecko, common house gecko, oriental garden lizard, green iguana, panther chameleon, Indian wolf snake and the brahminy blind snake.

Five giant tortoises of the genus Cylindraspis, the domed Mauritius giant tortoise, domed Rodrigues giant tortoise, saddle-backed Rodrigues giant tortoise, saddle-backed Mauritius giant tortoise, and the Réunion giant tortoise formerly inhabited the island Mauritius, Rodrigues, and Réunion but are now extinct. As the largest terrestrial herbivores they performed an important role in the natural Mauritian ecosystem and in the regeneration of forests. For this reason, the Aldabra giant tortoise from Aldabra and the radiated tortoise from the neighboring island of Madagascar, have been introduced to several conservation areas of Mauritius such as the Pamplemousses gardens and various patches of remaining indigenous forest.

The critically endangered hawksbill turtle (17% of the archipelago) and the endangered green turtle (75% of the archipelago) visit St. Brandon, with a focus on L'Île Coco which is critically important for the visiting hawksbill turtle. The leatherback turtle is very rare to find. The Cargados Carajos shoals are of national as well as international importance, being the very last important turtle nesting area in Mauritius.

=== Freshwater fauna ===
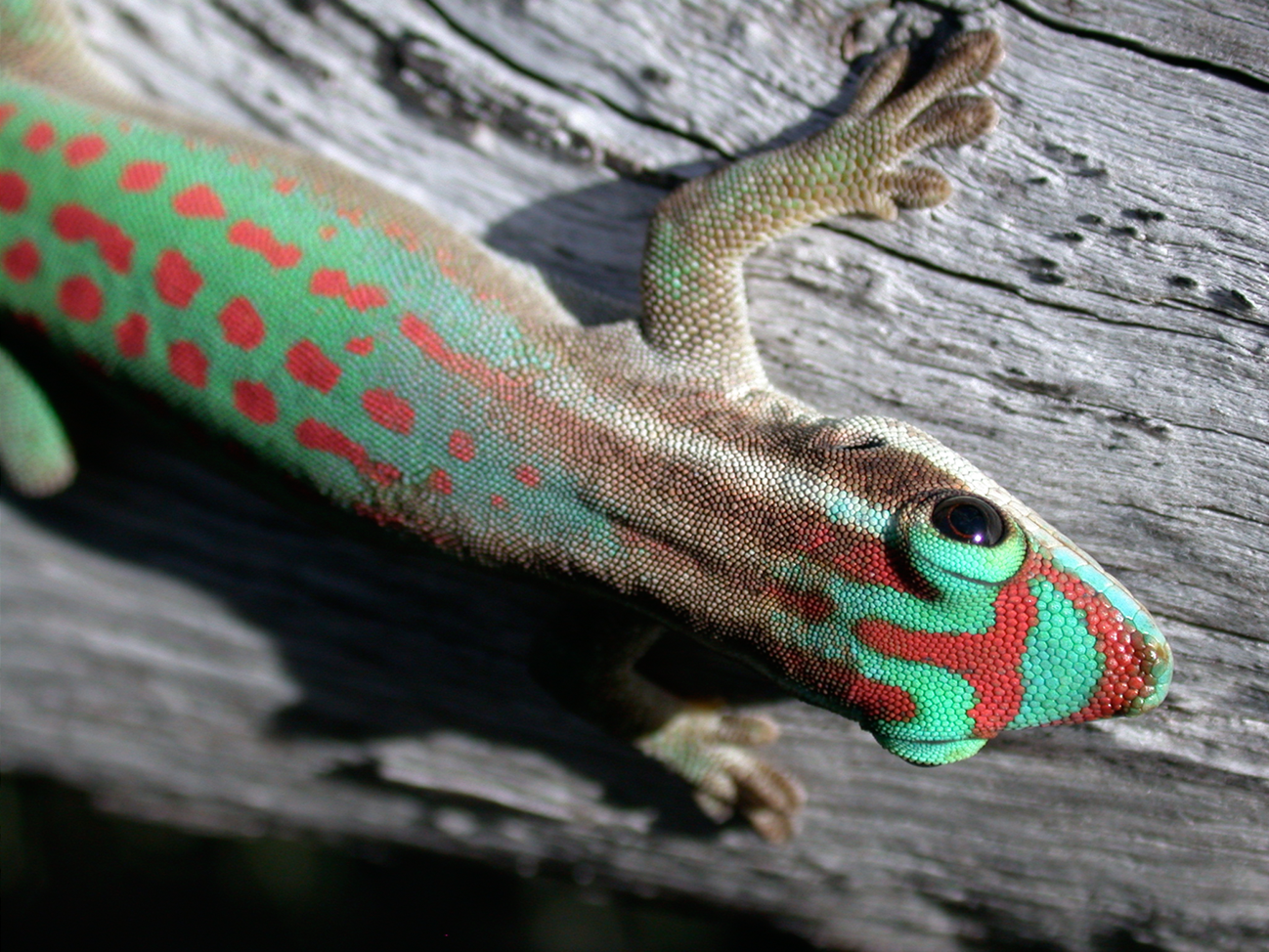
Mauritius ornate day gecko

In the 1950s, guppies locally known as millions abounded in Mauritian rivers. These little fish, often found in brackish water, appear to be outnumbered now by swordtails, introduced in the 1960s. Bigger fish like the carp, koi and the gourami have also dwindled after the introduction of tilapia in the 1950s. A popular freshwater fish used to be the damecéré, (known as carpe de Maillard in French) introduced by Monsieur Céré, an administrator of Pamplemousses garden during the French period. These silver tinted fish were common in ponds and lakes in the 1950s but are now rarely seen. They were often offered for sale at the Port-Louis Central Market and by street vendors.

Recently the berri rouge (a hybrid of the blue and Nile tilapia) has been introduced in view of supplementing the diet of the local population in protein. These fish are related to the tilapia but are somewhat rosy coloured. They are mostly bred on aquaculture farms. Two types of catfish (wels and walking catfish) are also newcomers, and were probably been dumped into local waters by aquarists. These fish are proving to be a nuisance and are disturbing the ecosystem of Mauritian rivers.

All the above fish have been introduced. Indigenous fish are few, and one of them is the goby, locally known as bichiques, of which two species are found, Awaous commersoni and Awaous pallidus, which locally are known as bichiques. They are extremely voracious fish and have been observed to swallow fish almost their size. The adults are found mostly near estuaries while the younger fish prefer the lower course of rivers. Seldom active, they lie in wait to pounce on an unsuspecting prey. Gobies go to lay their eggs in the sea, and the larvae swim upstream around December. They are caught and eaten as a delicacy by the local population. But their numbers seem to have considerably dwindled. (There is another theory that gobies do not go to the sea but that their eggs are swept into the ocean by water currents; the larvae swim upstream in great numbers during the new moon. Another indigenous fish is the mudskipper, locally known as the cabot, which is very rare.

A fish that can live both in sea and fresh water is the milkfish. Known locally as loubine, it is found in fairly great numbers near estuaries at particular times of the year. These young fish are often caught and eaten fried. However, this practice should be discouraged because these fish can grow very fast to adults weighing over 25 kg. This is perhaps the fish that the Dutch saw when they first landed in Mauritius in 1598. As reported by historians: "they saw many fish in the streams around the coast, and some large birds which dived after the fish and ate them."

The mullet also lives in shoals near estuaries but go up rivers in search of food. It is sometimes caught by fishermen on river banks who use bread as bait. However, it is a notoriously difficult fish to catch.

An easier game for the freshwater fisherman is perhaps the natal moony, locally known as line, which can also be fished along rivers, notably the Grand River North West.

Another indigenous dweller of Mauritian rivers and lakes is the eel. It is not very often seen and prefers to stay in crevices or hide under rocks. Eels spend most of their time in fresh water but go back to the sea, where they come from, to reproduce. Mauritian eels, like those from Madagascar, Réunion, Seychelles and East Africa, have their breeding grounds in the Nazareth Trough, an ocean trench situated between longitudes 60-65 °E and latitudes 10-20 °S. Eels can wriggle across land, and this perhaps explains why eels are found in some isolated ponds of Mauritius. There are three varieties of eels on the island. Two of them are found in Madagascar, Reunion and Africa, while the third one is present in the Seychelles. Most probably, the commonest eel is the marbled eel. Eels can grow quite big, if they cannot find a way to go back to the sea. This perhaps explains why some very big eels have been caught in Mauritius, notably at La Ferme reservoir. In Rodrigues an eel more than 2 metres long was caught in a spring, in the heart of a forest, at Cascade-Pigeon. It is believed that the eel was 100 years old. There is a theory that eels play an important role in ecosystems; they prevent springs from drying up. All three Mauritian species take a silvery colour when they go back to the sea.

Shrimps are common on the banks of most rivers. There are about six varieties of shrimps, and some of them are endemic. One type of shrimp is the camaron. This shrimp has a transparent body speckled with tiny reddish-brown or black spots. The female, smaller than the male, has two pincers of equal length but of a thinner size. Another type is the crevette chevaquine. It prefers to live near estuaries. Four varieties are endemic. They are the chevrette sonz, Caridina mauritii, the betangue and the petit chevrette.

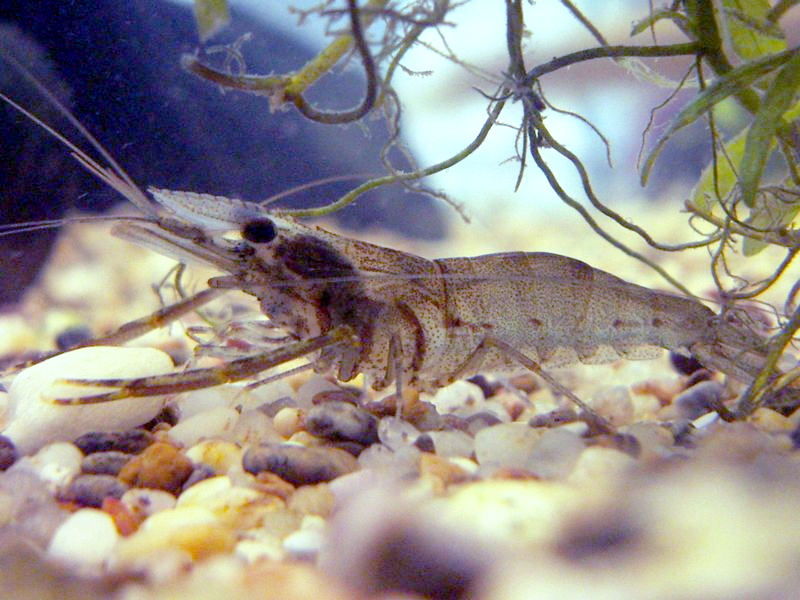
Camaron on river bed

Freshwater crabs are often found in waterways close to the sea. During the reproductive period, the adults gather on some riverbanks near the coast. The eggs are swept into the sea by water currents, and on hatching the young are carried into the river or coastal pond by the tides. The crabs feed mostly on algae and other vegetable matter.

Soft shell terrapins with long necks have been noticed in some rivers. They are of Chinese origin and were apparently introduced in a river of the Moka District about a century ago; these reptiles are considered to be aggressive and are fast invading other rivers of the island.

=== Marine life ===
==== Fish ====
The marine fish of Mauritius include holocentrids (Myripristis berndti, Neoniphon sammara, Sargocentron spiniferum and Sargocentron diadema), mullet (Mugil cephalus and Crenimugil crenilabis), rabbitfish (Siganus sutor and Siganus argenteus), groupers (Cephalopholis sonnerati, Cephalopholis argus, Epinephelus fasciatus, Epinephelus hexagonatus, Epinephelus lanceolatus, Epinephelus merra, Epinephelus morio, Epinephelus tukula and Variola louti), seabream (Rhabdosargus sarba), jacks (Caranx ignobilis, Elagatis bipinnulata and Trachinotus baillonii), goatfish (Mulloidichthys vanicolensis, Parupeneus barberinus and Parupeneus cyclostomus), butterflyfish (Chaetodon trifasciatus, Chaetodon kleinii, Chaetodon auriga, Hemitaurichthys zoster and Forcipiger flavissimus), Moorish idol (Zanclus cornutus), angelfish (Pomacanthus semicirculatus), cardinalfish (Ostorhinchus apogonoides and Cheilodipterus macrodon), emperors (Monotaxis grandoculis, Gnathodentex aureolineatus, Lethrinus mahsena, Lethrinus nebulosus and Lethrinus harak), hawkfish (Cirrhitichthys oxycephalus, Cirrhitops mascarenensis and Paracirrhites forsteri), damsels (Abudefduf sparoides, Abudefduf margariteus, Abudefduf sordidus, Dascyllus abudafur, Pomacentrus pikei, Pomacentrus caeruleus, Stegastes limbatus, Stegastes lividus and Stegastes pelicieri), clownfish (Amphiprion chrysogaster, Amphiprion clarkii and Amphiprion allardi), tangs (Acanthurus nigrofuscus, Acanthurus triostegus, Ctenochaetus striatus, Paracanthurus, Zebrasoma gemmatum and Naso unicornis), snappers (Etelis carbunculus, Etelis coruscans and Lutjanus kasmira), jobfish (Aprion and Pristipomoides filamentosus), parrotfish (Chlorurus cyanescens, Scarus scaber and Scarus ghobban), mahi mahi (Coryphaena hippurus), scombrids (Thunnus albacares, Katsuwonus pelamis and Acanthocybium solandri), barracudas (Sphyraena barracuda and Sphyraena acutipinnis), natal moony (Monodactylus argenteus), boxfish (Ostracion meleagris and Ostracion trachys), pufferfish (Arothron nigropunctatus, Arothron hispidus and Canthigaster valentini), porcupinefish (Diodon hystrix, Diodon liturosus and Diodon holocanthus), triggerfish (Balistoides conspicillum, Balistapus, Pseudobalistes fuscus, Odonus niger, Rhinecanthus aculeatus and Sufflamen chrysopterum), blennies (Alticus monochrus), gobies (Nemateleotris magnifica, Istigobius decoratus and Valenciennea strigata), catfish (Plotosus lineatus), anthias (Pseudanthias squamipinnis and Mirolabrichthys evansi), wrasses (Coris aygula, Bodianus anthioides, Bodianus macrourus, Cheilinus trilobatus, Cheilinus chlorourus, Halichoeres hortulanus, Macropharyngodon bipartitus and Labroides dimidiatus), tilefish (Malacanthus latovittatus), fusiliers (Caesio caerulaurea and Caesio teres), eels (Gymnothorax griseus and Myrichthys maculosus), scorpionfish (Pterois antennata, Rhinopias eschmeyeri, Scorpaenopsis cirrosa and Synanceia verrucosa), anglerfish (Antennarius commerson and Antennarius maculatus), seahorses (Hippocampus histrix), cornetfish (Fistularia commersonii), trumpetfish (Aulostomus chinensis), needlefish (Tylosurus crocodilus), marlins (Istiompax indica, Makaira mazara, Kajikia audax and Istiophorus platypterus), swordfish (Xiphias gladius), rays (Aetobatus narinari and Mobula alfredi), sharks (Carcharhinus amblyrhynchos, Carcharhinus leucas, Carcharhinus limbatus, Carcharhinus melanopterus, Galeocerdo cuvier, Rhincodon typus, Sphyrna lewini and Sphyrna mokarran), remoras (Echeneis naucrates and Remora remora) and many more.

==== Other marine life ====
Crustaceans include the shore crab (Percnon guinotae), natal lightfoot crab (Grapsus tenuicrustatus), ghost crab (Ocypode pallidula and Ocypode ceratophthalmus), hermit crabs (Dardanus guttatus and Calcinus elegans), spiny lobsters (Panulirus penicillatus, Panulirus longipes and Panulirus versicolor), mantis shrimp (Odontodactylus scyllarus) and shrimp (Stenopus hispidus, Anyclocaris brevicarpalis, Lysmata amboinensis, Urocaridella antonbruunii and Rhynchocinetes durbanensis).

Cephalopods include the squid (Sepioteuthis lessoniana) and the octopus (Octopus cyanea and Octopus sp.)

Echinoderms include the brittle star (Ophiolepis superba), starfish (Fromia milleporella, Fromia monilis, Nardoa variolata, Culcita schmideliana and Acanthaster planci), urchins (Echinodiscus auritus, Colobocentrotus atratus, Echinometra mathaei, Diadema and Echinothrix diadema) and sea cucumbers (Holothuria leucospilota and Actinopyga echinites).

Marine gastropods include porcelains (Cypraea, Mauritia histrio, Monetaria caputserpentis and Monetaria annulus), cones (Conus), ranellids (Charonia tritonis, Monoplex aquatilis and Monoplex pilearis) and conchs (Gibberukus gibberulus, Turbinella pyrum, Lambis lambis, Lambis truncata, Strombus sinuatus, Strombus plicatus and Harpago arthritica).

Bivalves include the black-lip pearl oyster (Pinctada margaritifera), prickly pen shell (Pinna muricata), tiger lucine (Codakia tigerina) and giant clams (Tridacna squamosa, Tridacna squamosina, Tridacna gigas, Tridacna rosewateri and Tridacna maxima).

Cnidarians include the jellyfish (Chironex fleckeri and Thysanostoma loriferum), siphonophores (Physalia physalis and Porpita porpita), anemones (Heteractis magnifica), coral (Acropora, Pocillopora damicornis, Pocillopora eydouxi, Porites lutea, Platygyra daedalea, Galaxea fascicularis and Pavona cactus) and gorgons (Paramuricea and Subergorgia mollis).

=== Butterflies ===
About 39 butterfly species are known from Mauritius and Rodrigues. Seven of these are endemic.

== Flora ==
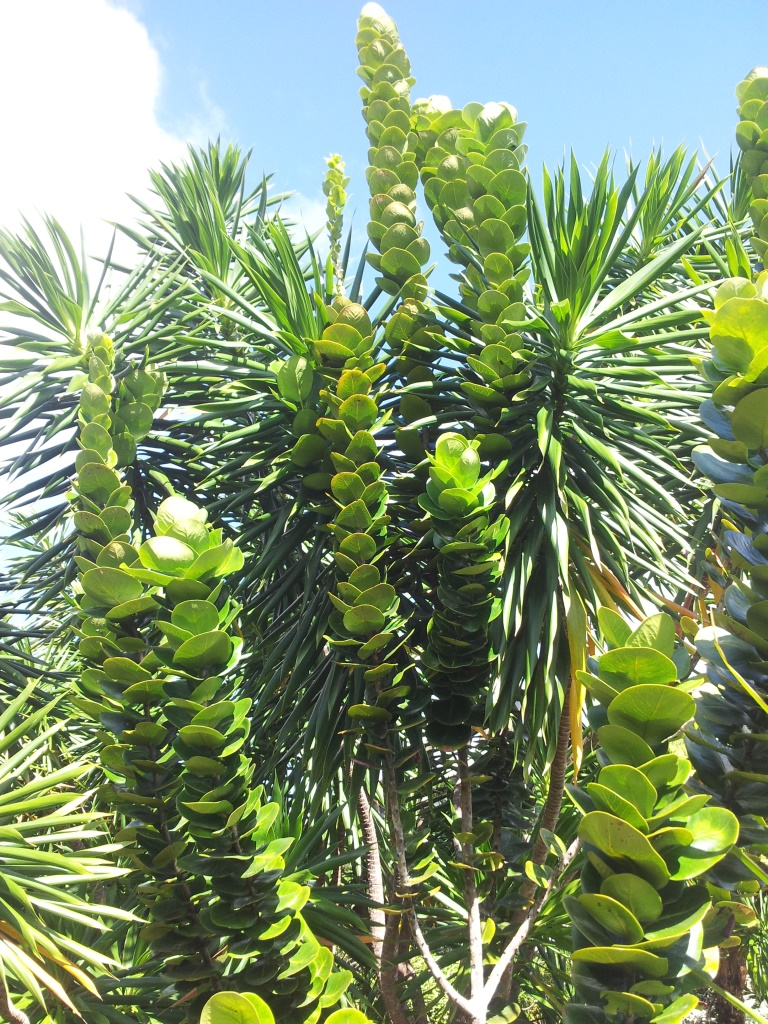
An endemic ebony species, Diospyros revaughanii, at Monvert Nature Park.

=== Indigenous flora ===
Over 700 native species of flowering plant are found in Mauritius and nearly half of these (246) are endemic. Rainforest formerly covered most of the island with palm savannah in drier regions and areas of heathland in the mountains. Most of this natural vegetation has been destroyed and what remains is threatened by the spread of introduced plants.

Native trees include eleven surviving species of Mauritius ebony (Diospyros tesselaria, Diospyros egrettarum, Diospyros revaughanii, Diospyros melanida, Diospyros leucomelas and several others), takamaka (Calophyllum tacamahaca), manglier (Sideroxylon cinereum, Sideroxylon puberulum, Sideroxylon grandiflorum and (Sideroxylon boutonianum), ox tree (Polyscias maraisiana), bois blanc (Polyscias rodriguesiana), bois de natte (Labourdonnaisia calophylloides, Labourdonnnaisia glauca and Labourdonnaisia revoluta), makak (Mimusops balata and Mimusops petiolaris), bois puant (Foetidia mauritiana), bois d'olive (Cassine orientalis), bois de judas (Cossinia pinnata), laffouche (Ficus densifolia, Ficus reflexa, Ficus rubra and more), bois de clou (Eugenia lucida and Eugenia kanakana), arbre ferney (Eugenia bojeri), bois papaye (Polyscias gracilis), mapou tree (Cyphostemma mappia), bois de rat (Tarenna), baume (Psiadia arguta and Psiadia rodriguesiana), hop bush (Dodonaea viscosa), bois binjouin (Terminalia bentzoe), bois de pipe (Hilsenbergia petiolaris) and a range of other indigenous and endemic tree species.

The palm species that are indigenous to the island of Mauritius are Acanthophoenix rubra (possibly other species), Dictyosperma album (var. album & conjugatum), Hyophorbe lagenicaulis, Hyophorbe vaughanii, Hyophorbe verschaffeltii, Latania loddigesii, Corypha umbraculifera and Tectiphiala ferox.

Indigenous stipes include the cordyline (Cordyline mauritiana), bois de chandelle (Dracaena marginata) and chandelle (Dracaena concinna).

Mauritius is also home to the rarest palm in the world, Hyophorbe amaricaulis, with only one specimen. It is found in the SSR Botanical Garden of Curepipe.

Mauritius is the home of a large number of endemic species of Pandanus (screwpine or vacoas), namely: Pandanus carmichaelii, Pandanus barkleyi, Pandanus conglomeratus, Pandanus drupaceus, Pandanus eydouxia, Pandanus glaucocephalus, Pandanus iceryi, Pandanus incertus, Pandanus macrostigma, Pandanus microcarpus, Pandanus obsoletus, Pandanus palustris, Pandanus prostratus, Pandanus pseudomontanus, Pandanus pyramidalis, Pandanus rigidifolius, Pandanus sphaeroides, Pandanus spathulatus, Pandanus vandermeeschii and Pandanus wiehei. The common vacoas sac (Pandanus utilis) of Madagascar has also been introduced and propagated in Mauritius, and it has now naturalised.

The national flower of Mauritius is boucle d'oreille (Trochetia boutoniana), which is now restricted to a single mountain.

Other Trochetia species are endemic to Mauritius. They are Trochetia parviflora, Trochetia uniflora, Trochetia triflora and Trochetia blackburniana.

Endemic hibiscus species include the mandrinette (Hibiscus fragilis), mandrinette blanc (Hibiscus genevei), hibiscus des mascareignes (Hibiscus boryanus) and the mandrinette de rodrigues (Hibiscus liliflorus).

Endemic flowers include the dombeya (Dombeya acutangula and Dombeya rodriguesiana), bois tambour (Tambourissa cocottensis, Tambourissa amplifolia, Tambourissa peltata, Tambourissa pedicellata, Tambourissa quadrifa and Tambourissa tau), the Mauritius bloody bell flower (Nesocodon mauritianus), barleria (Barleria observatrix), bois banane (Gaertnera psychotrioides, Gaertnera hirtiflora and Gaertnera longifolia), bois corail (Chassalia coriacea and Chassalia boryana), lys du pays (Crinum mauritianum), orchidee (Oeoniella, Oeonia, etc.) and many more.

=== Introduced and invasive plants ===
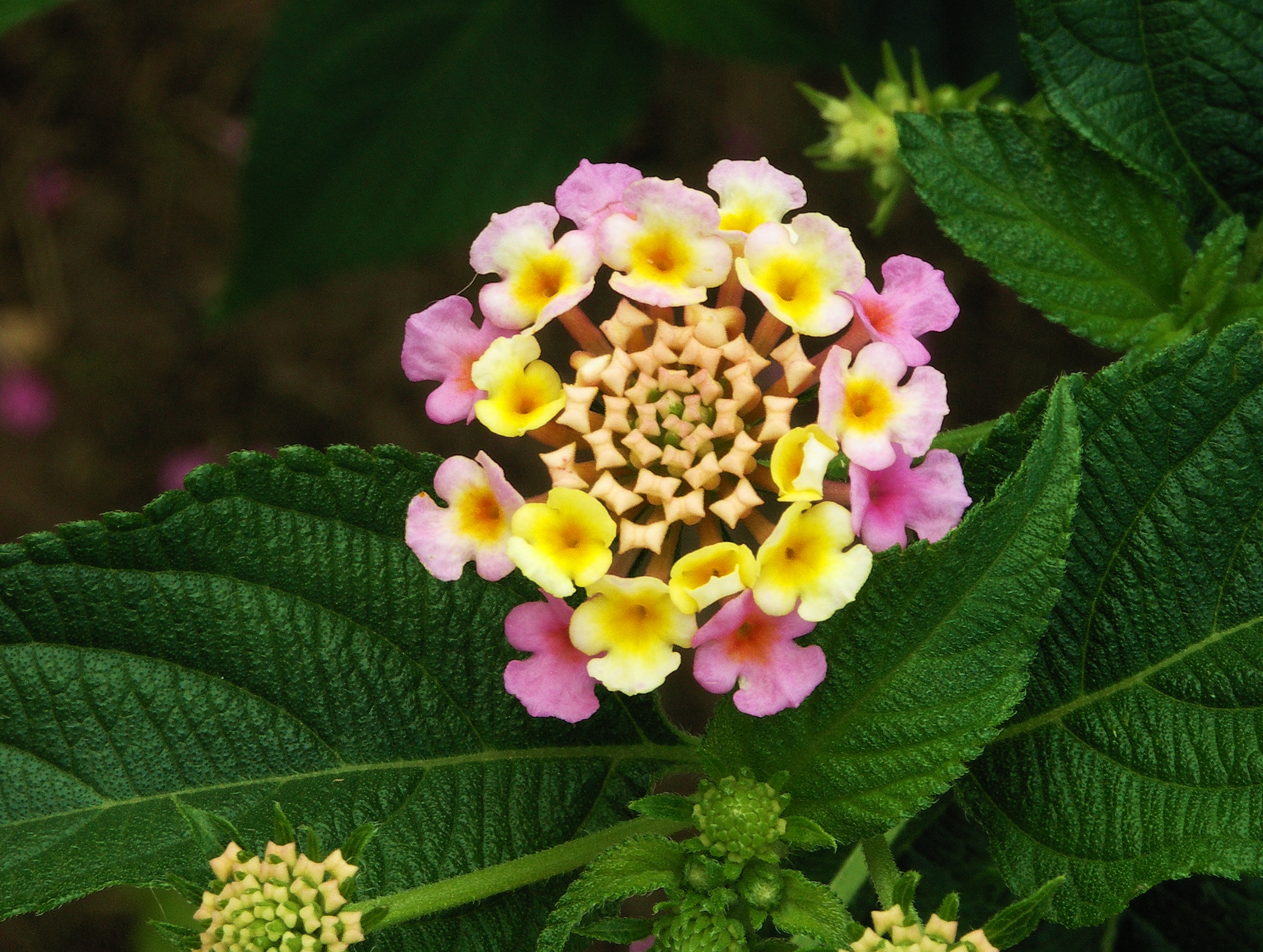
The invasive Lantana camara

Introduced plants that have become invasive include "Chinese" (actually Brazilian) guava (Psidium cattleianum), travellers trees (Ravenala madagascariensis) and Lantana camara.

For the purpose of landscaping and gardening in Mauritius, exotics have traditionally been used, and many of these have spread into the surrounding vegetation. Bougainvillea (Bougainvillea glabra and Bougainvillea spectabilis) and frangipani (Plumeria obtusa and Plumeria rubra) are still among the most commonly planted ornamental species. Another species is the royal poinciana, which is also common.

However, for urban and roadside landscaping Mauritius is beginning to turn to their many varied and unique endemic plant species. Many endemic species, such as bottle palms, mapou tree and ox tree, are now being used as ornamentals for both public landscaping and in private gardens across Mauritius. The African baobab is rare but still planted in gardens.

== Conservation ==
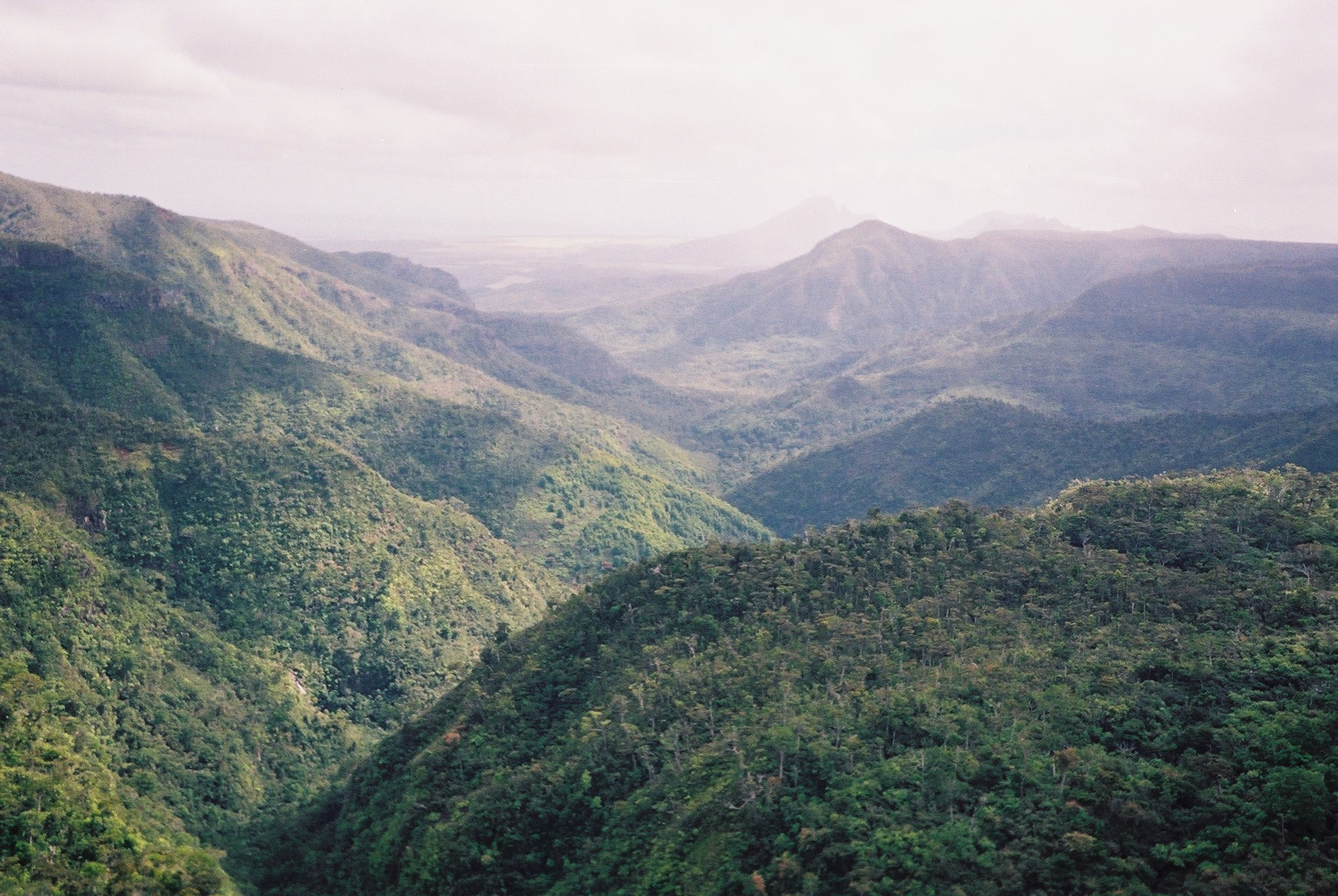
Black River Gorges National Park

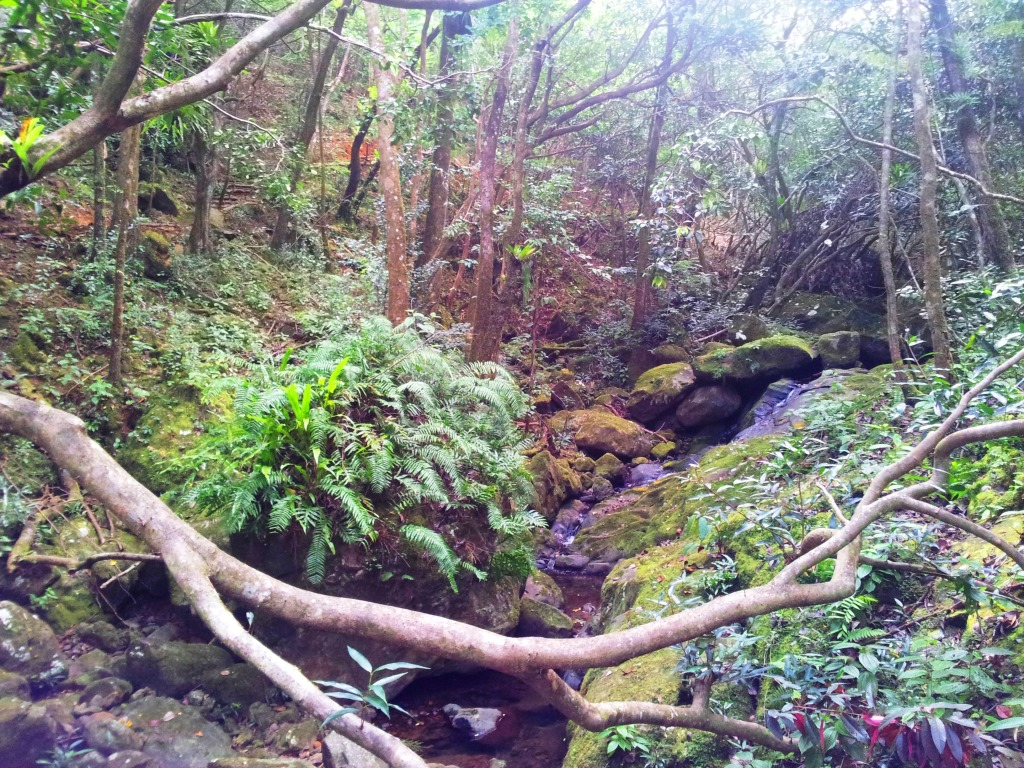
Indigenous forest preserved at Vallée de Ferney

Conservation work in Mauritius is carried out by the Forestry Service, National Parks and Conservation Service (NPCS) and by non-governmental organizations such as the Mauritian Wildlife Foundation (MWF), the Durrell Wildlife Conservation Trust (DWCT) and the Saint Brandon Conservation Trust. Efforts to preserve native flora and fauna have included captive breeding, habitat restoration and the eradication of introduced species.

Protection involves three national parks, nature reserves, a range of other protected areas, and botanical gardens for education and public outreach. Black River Gorges National Park covers 65.74 km^{2} (25.38 sq mi) of land and another 45 km^{2} (17 sq mi) is protected by nature reserves such as Round Island and Île aux Aigrettes.

== Flora and fauna of St. Brandon ==
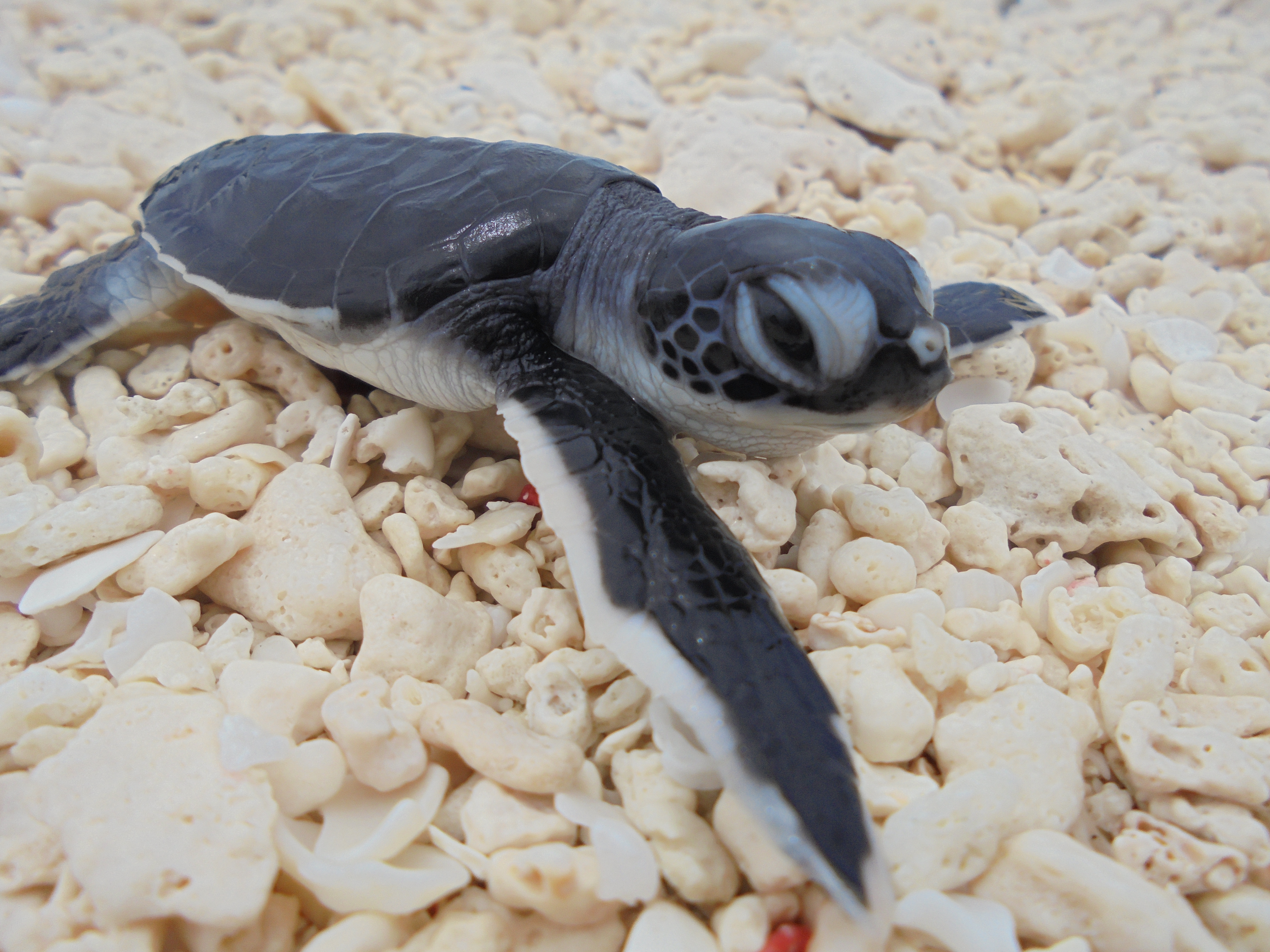
Protecting St Brandon Islands

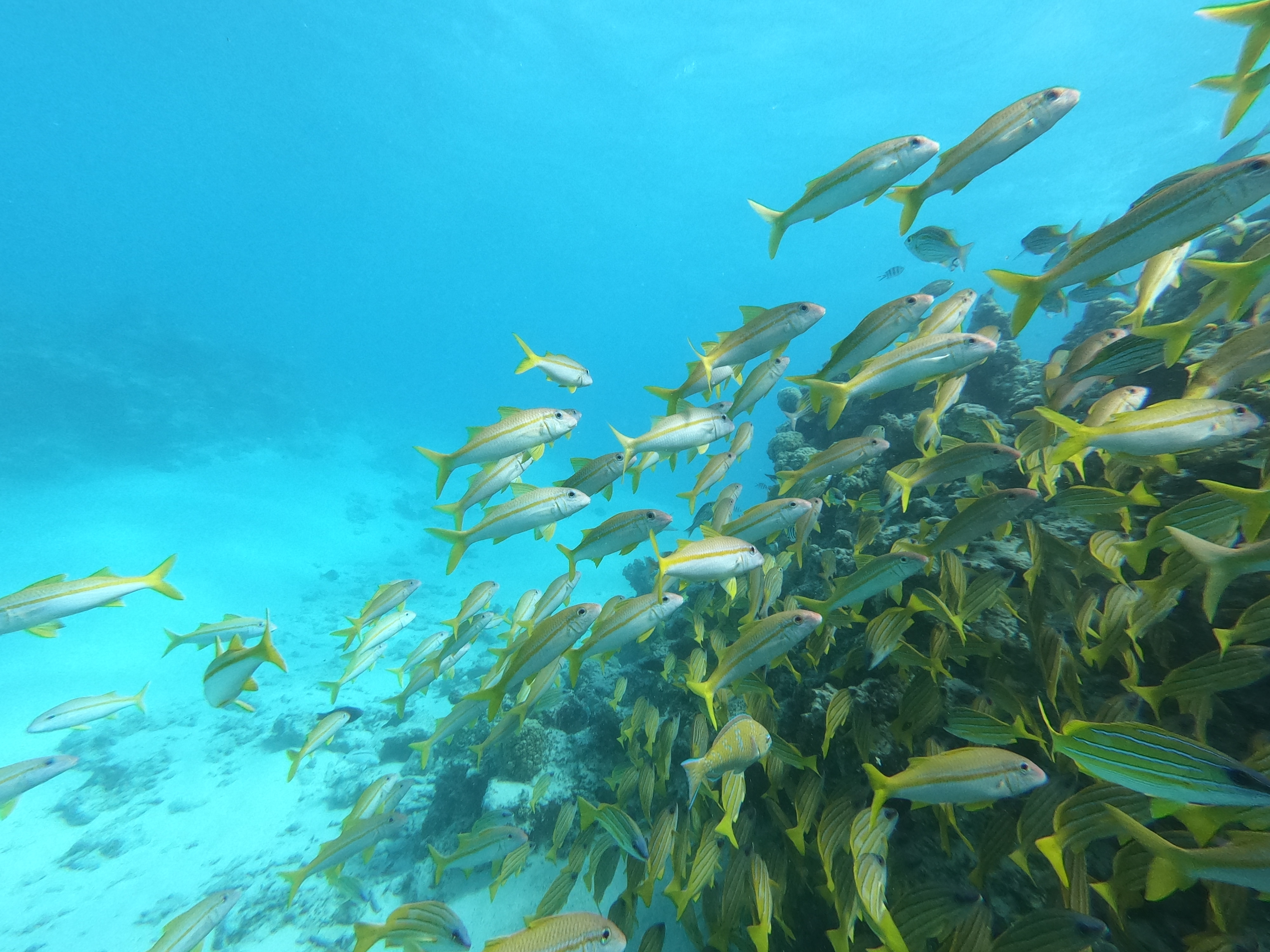
Protecting Fauna of St Brandon Atoll

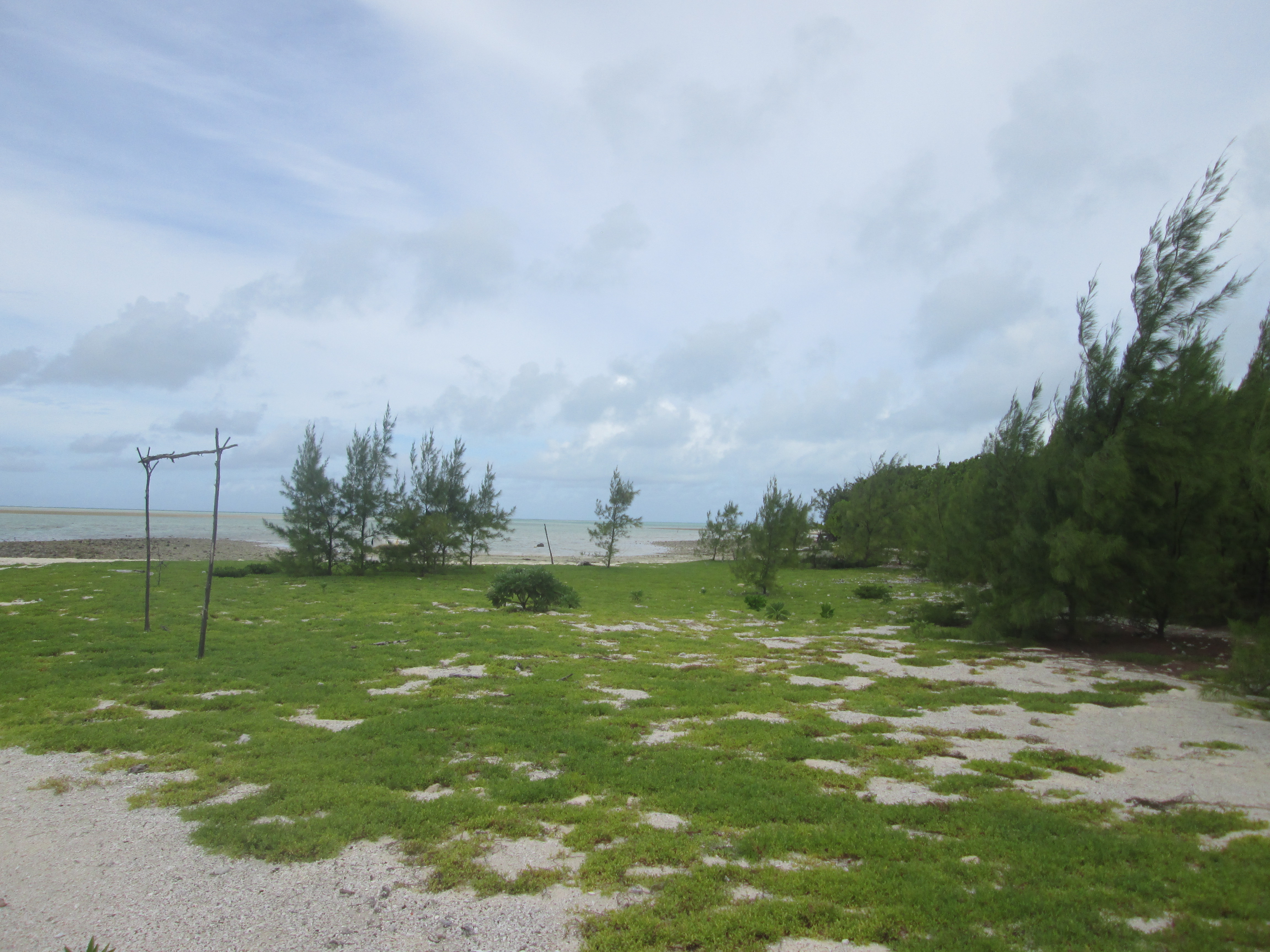
The Thirteen Islands of St Brandon - Images of Île Raphael, Cargados Carajos in Mauritius

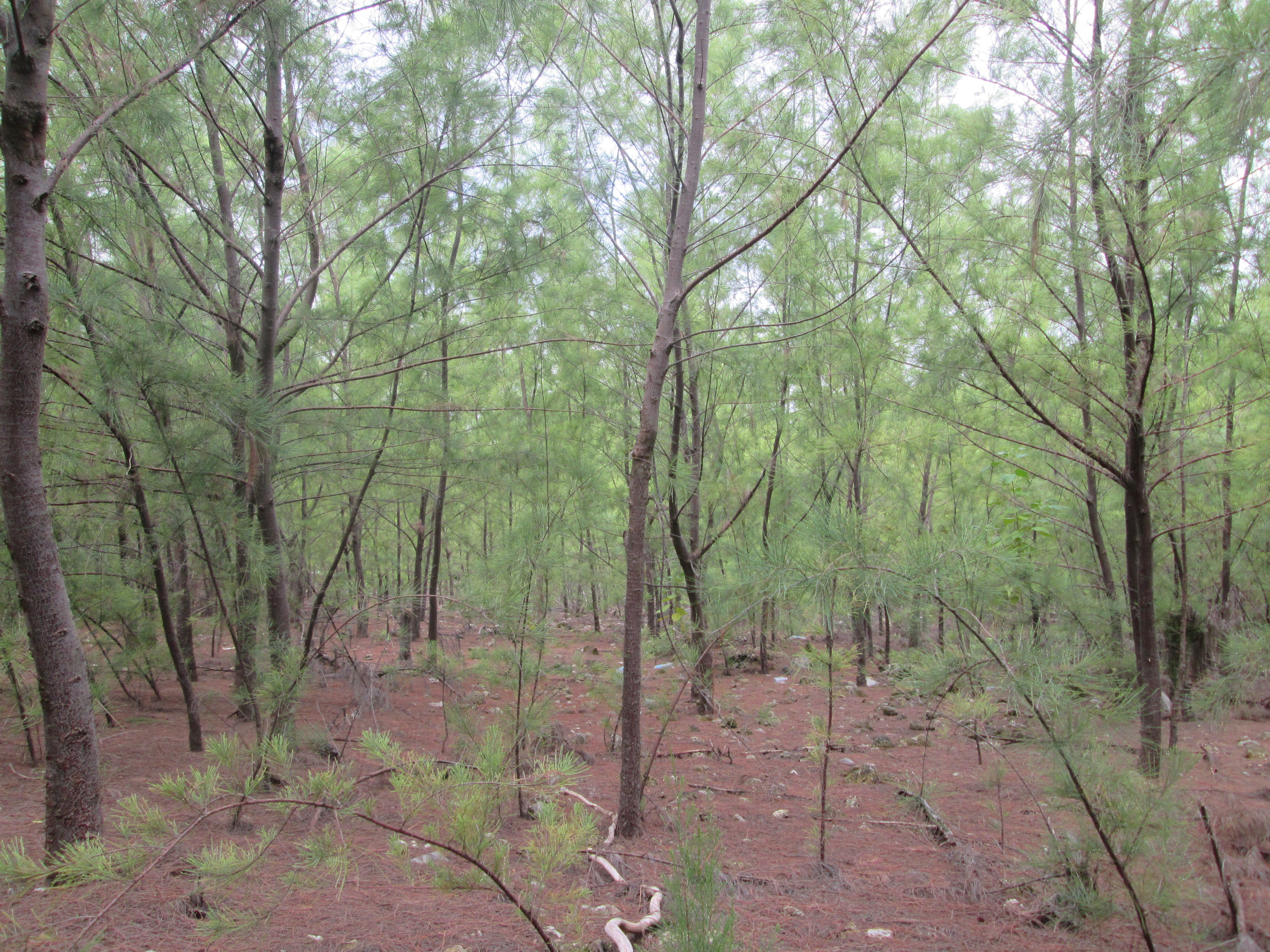
The Thirteen Islands of St Brandon - Images of Île Raphael, Cargados Carajos in Mauritius

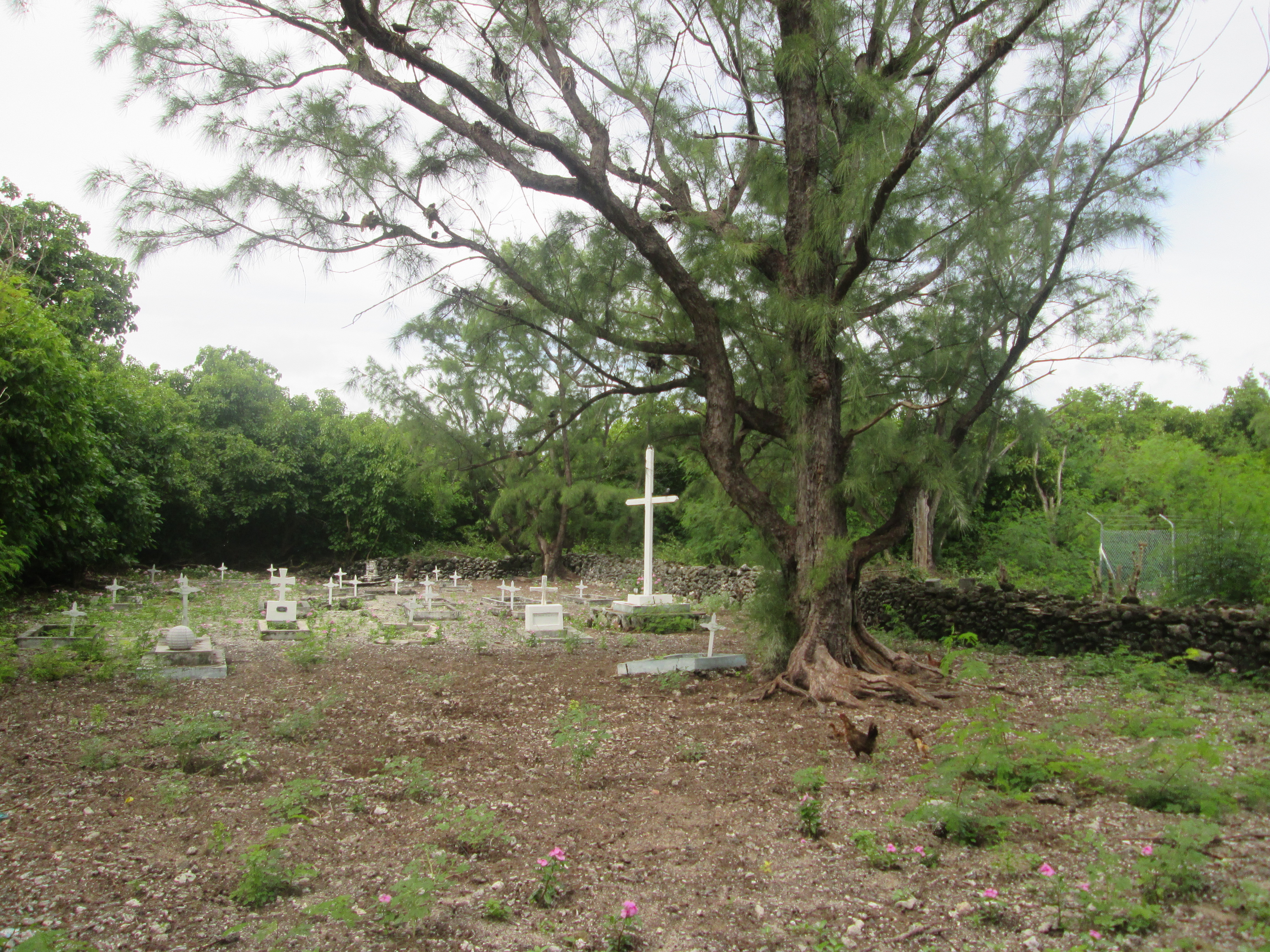
The Thirteen Islands of St Brandon - Cemetery of Île Raphael

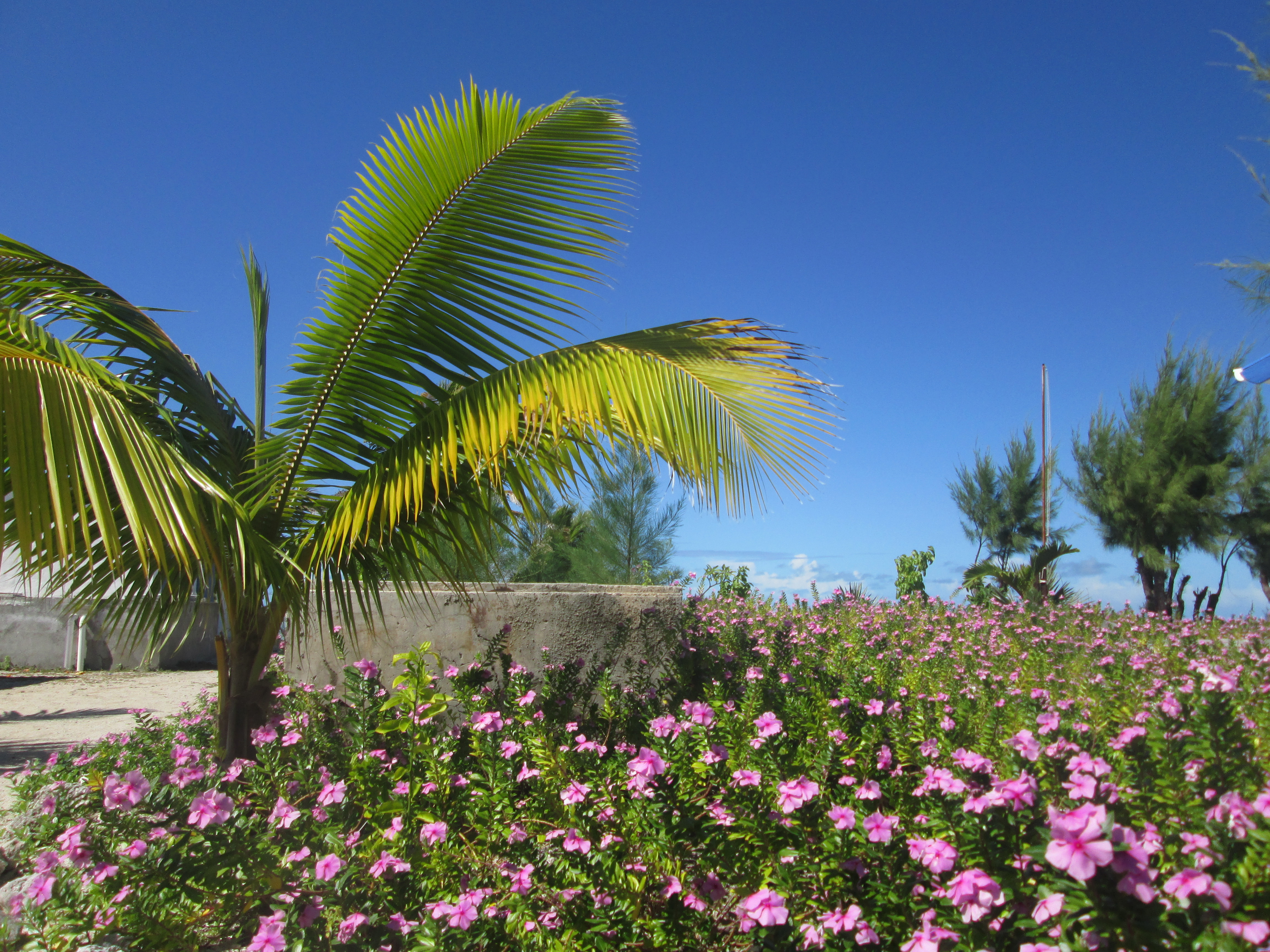
The Thirteen Islands of St Brandon - Images of Île Raphael, Cargados Carajos in Mauritius

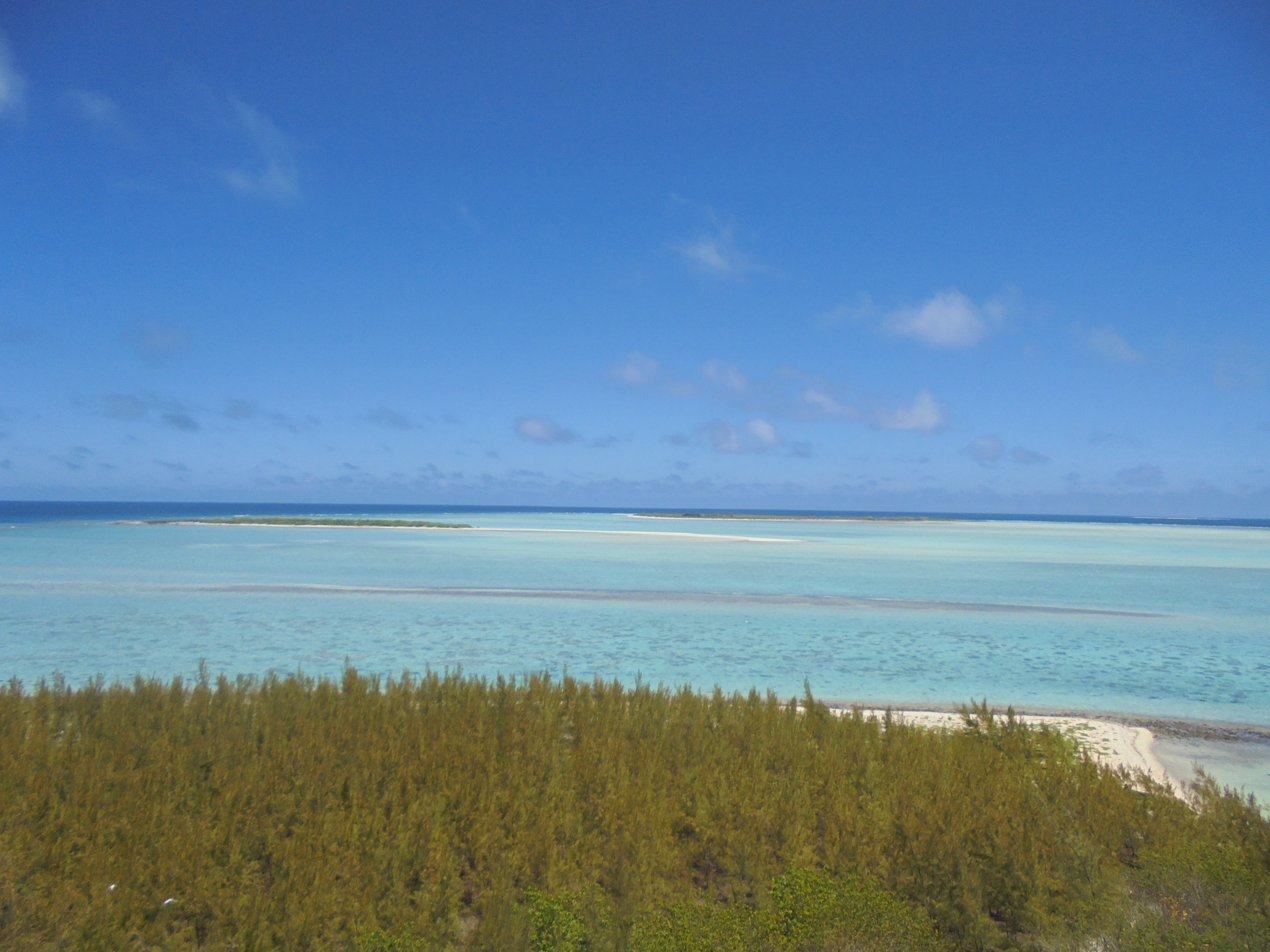
The Thirteen Islands of St Brandon - Images of Île Raphael, Cargados Carajos in Mauritius

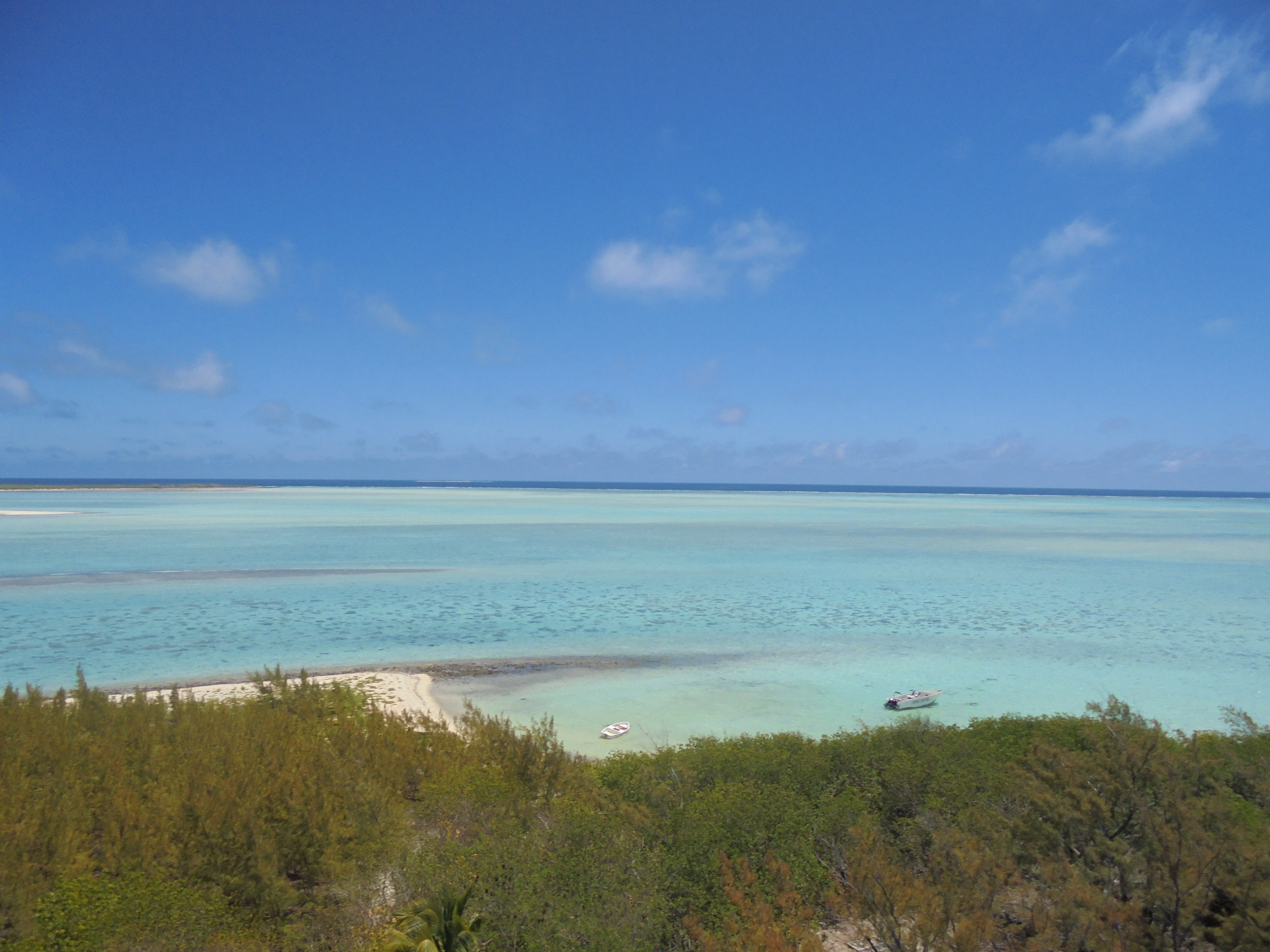
The Thirteen Islands of St Brandon - Images of Île Raphael, Cargados Carajos in Mauritius

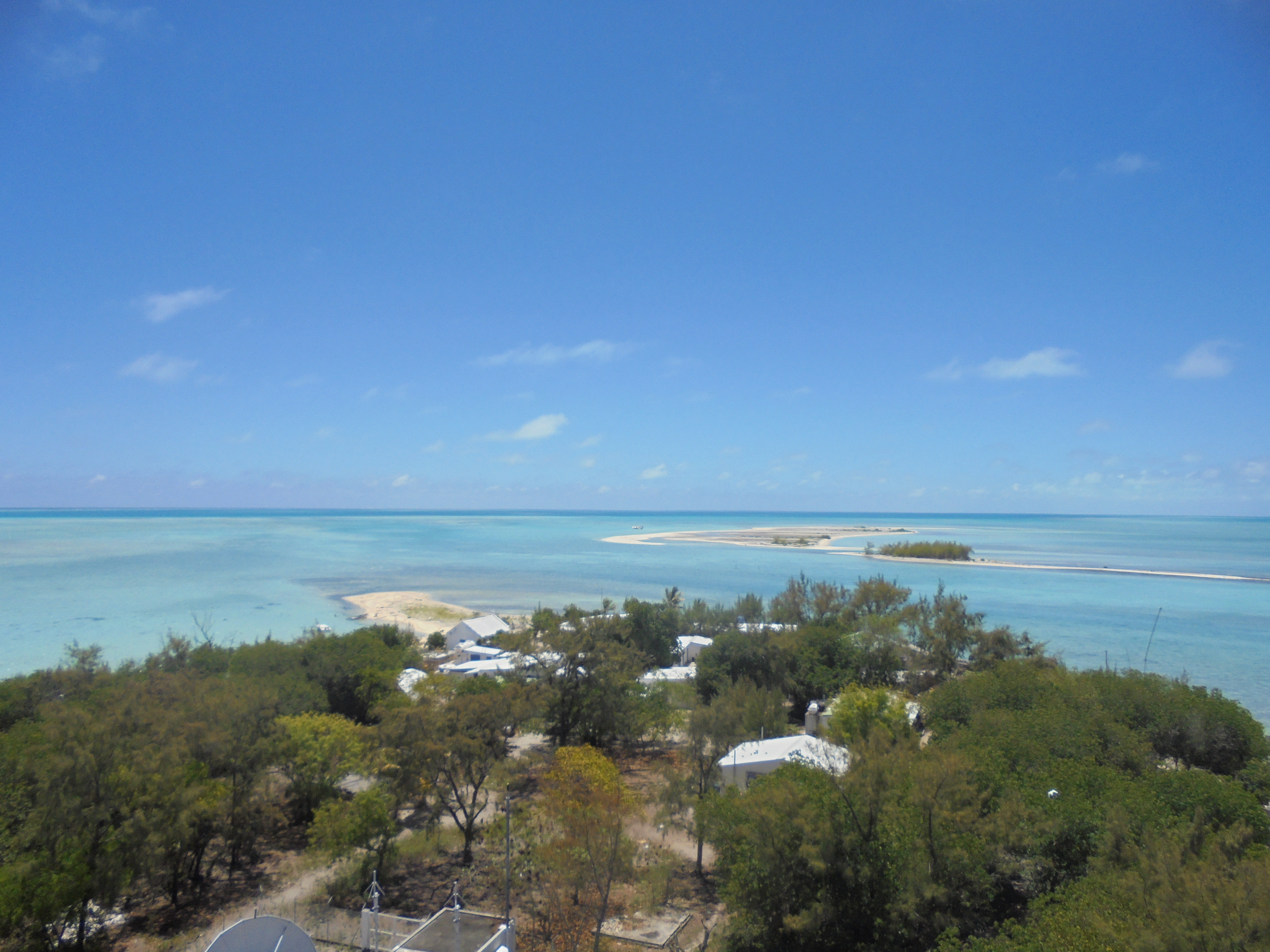
The Thirteen Islands of St Brandon - Images of Île Raphael, Cargados Carajos in Mauritius

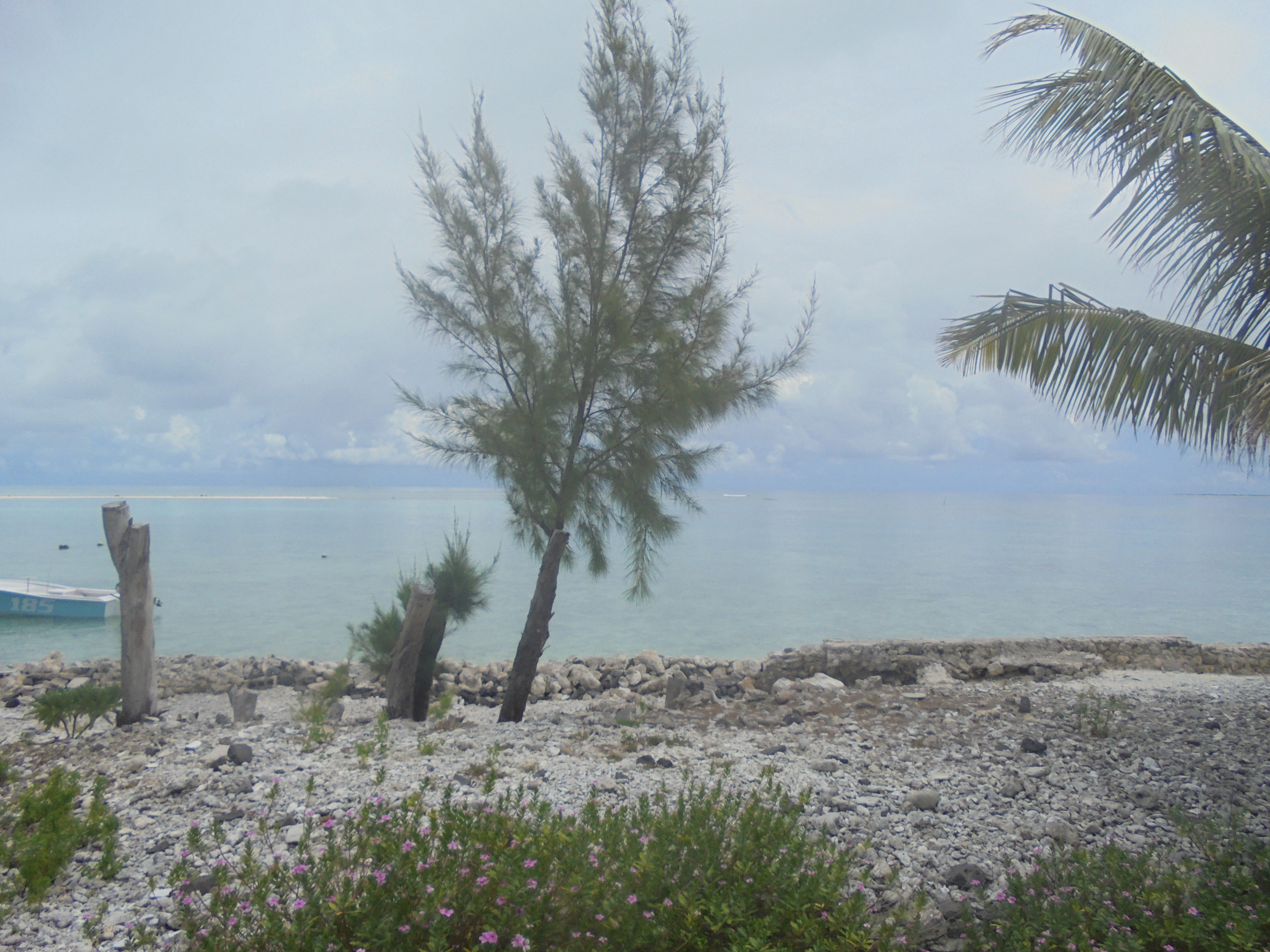
The Thirteen Islands of St Brandon - Images of Île Raphael, Cargados Carajos in Mauritius

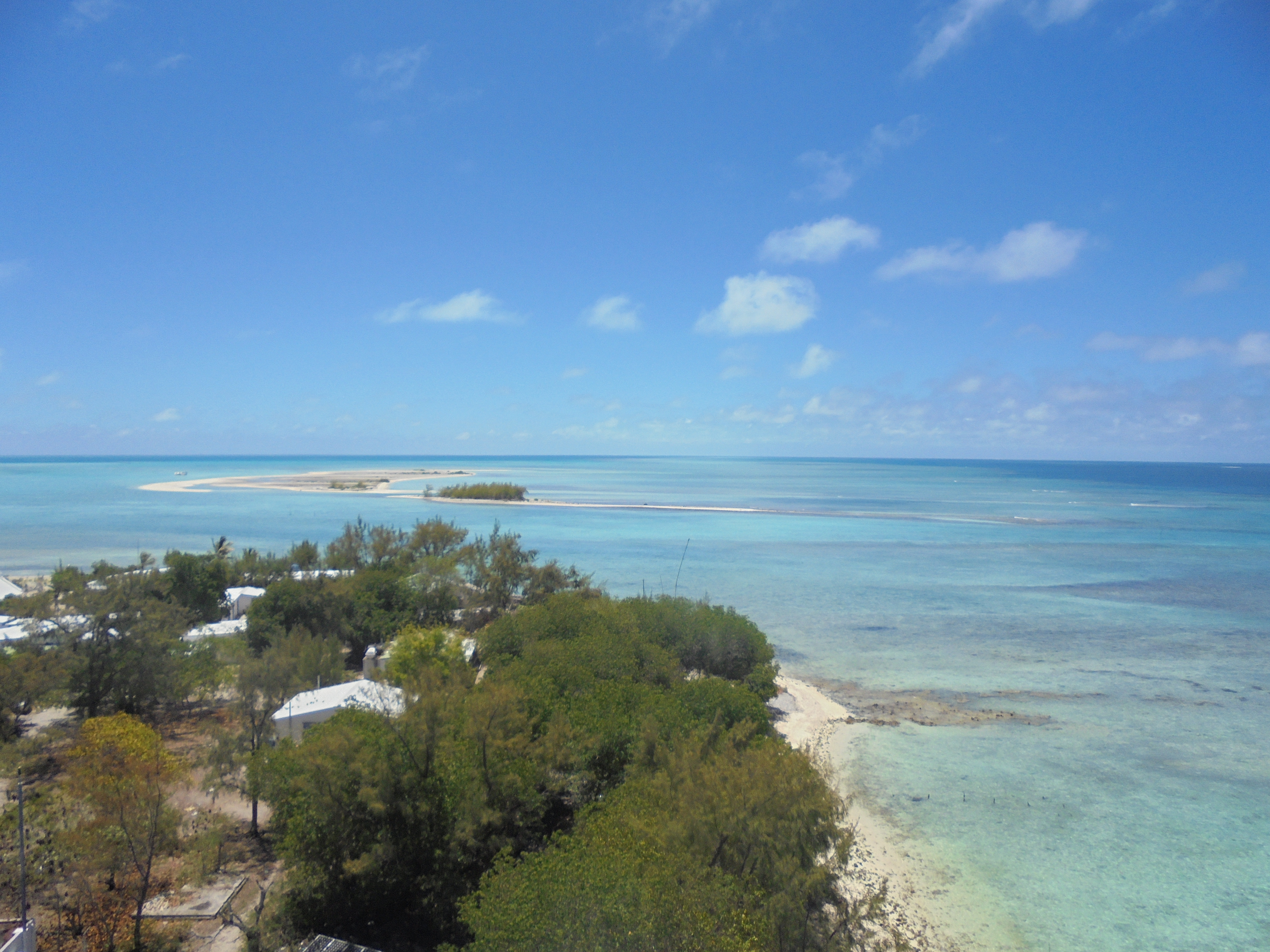
The Thirteen Islands of St Brandon - Images of Île Raphael, Cargados Carajos in Mauritius

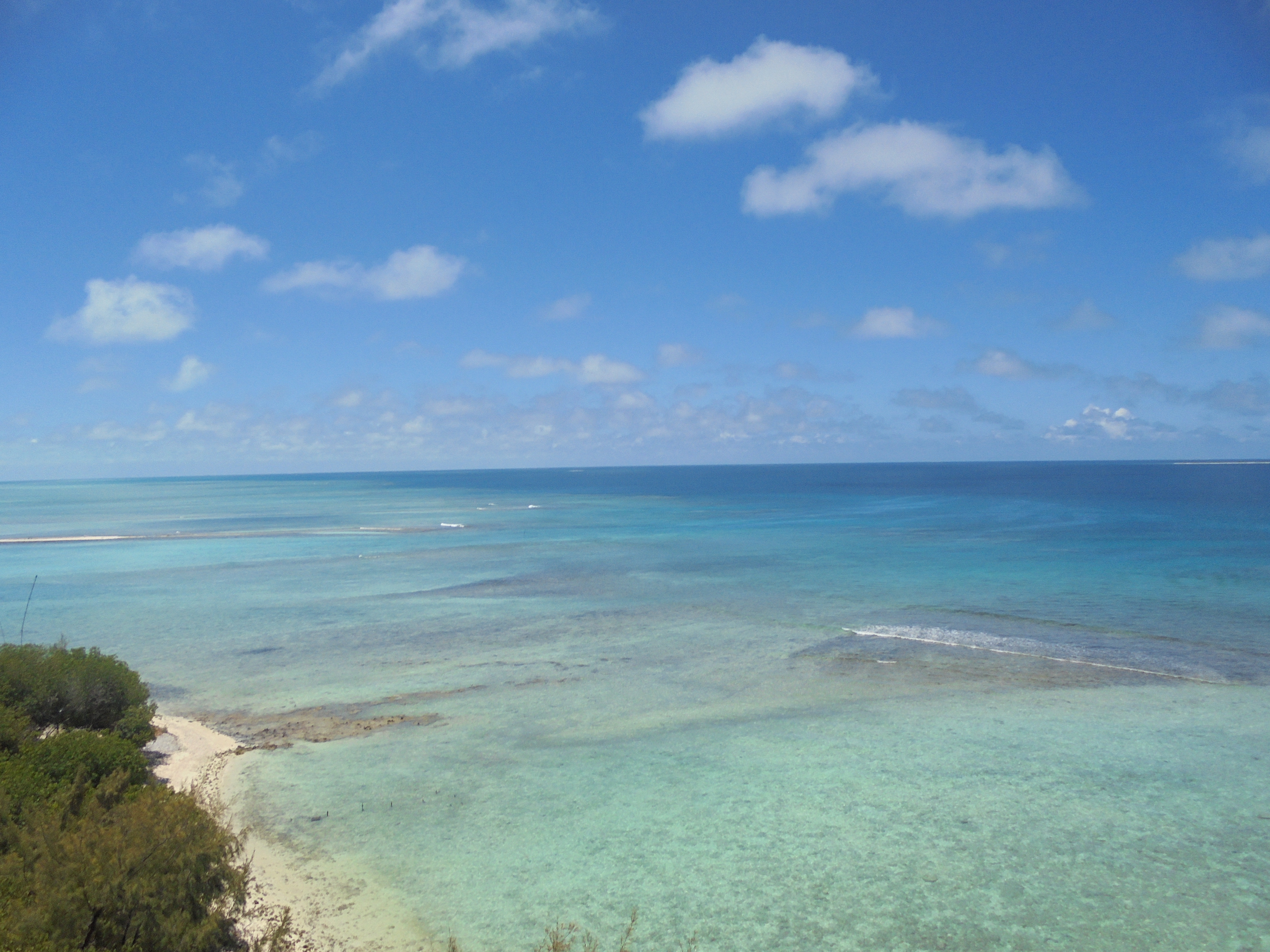
The Thirteen Islands of St Brandon - Images of Île Raphael, Cargados Carajos in Mauritius

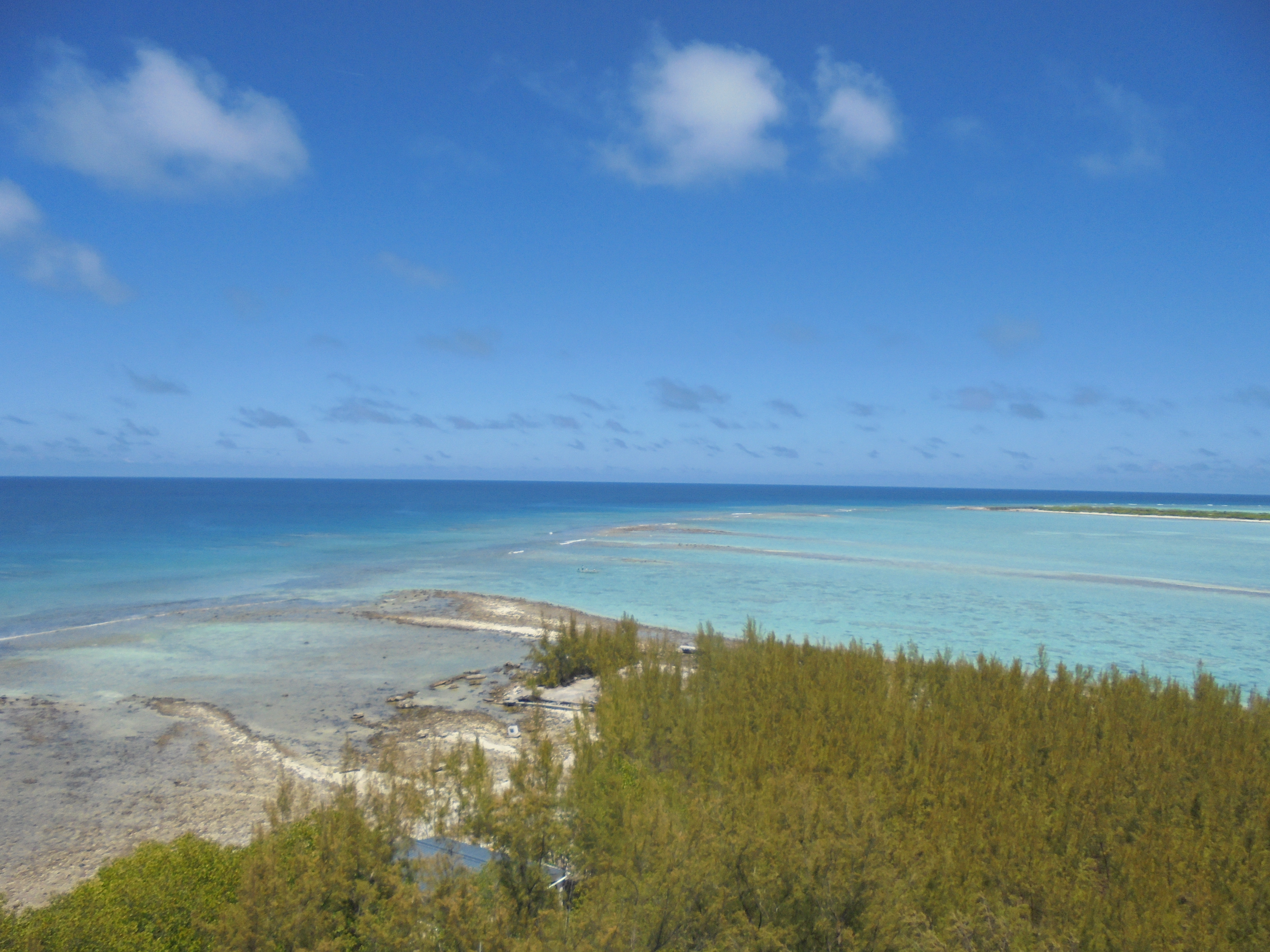
The Thirteen Islands of St Brandon - Images of Île Raphael, Cargados Carajos in Mauritius

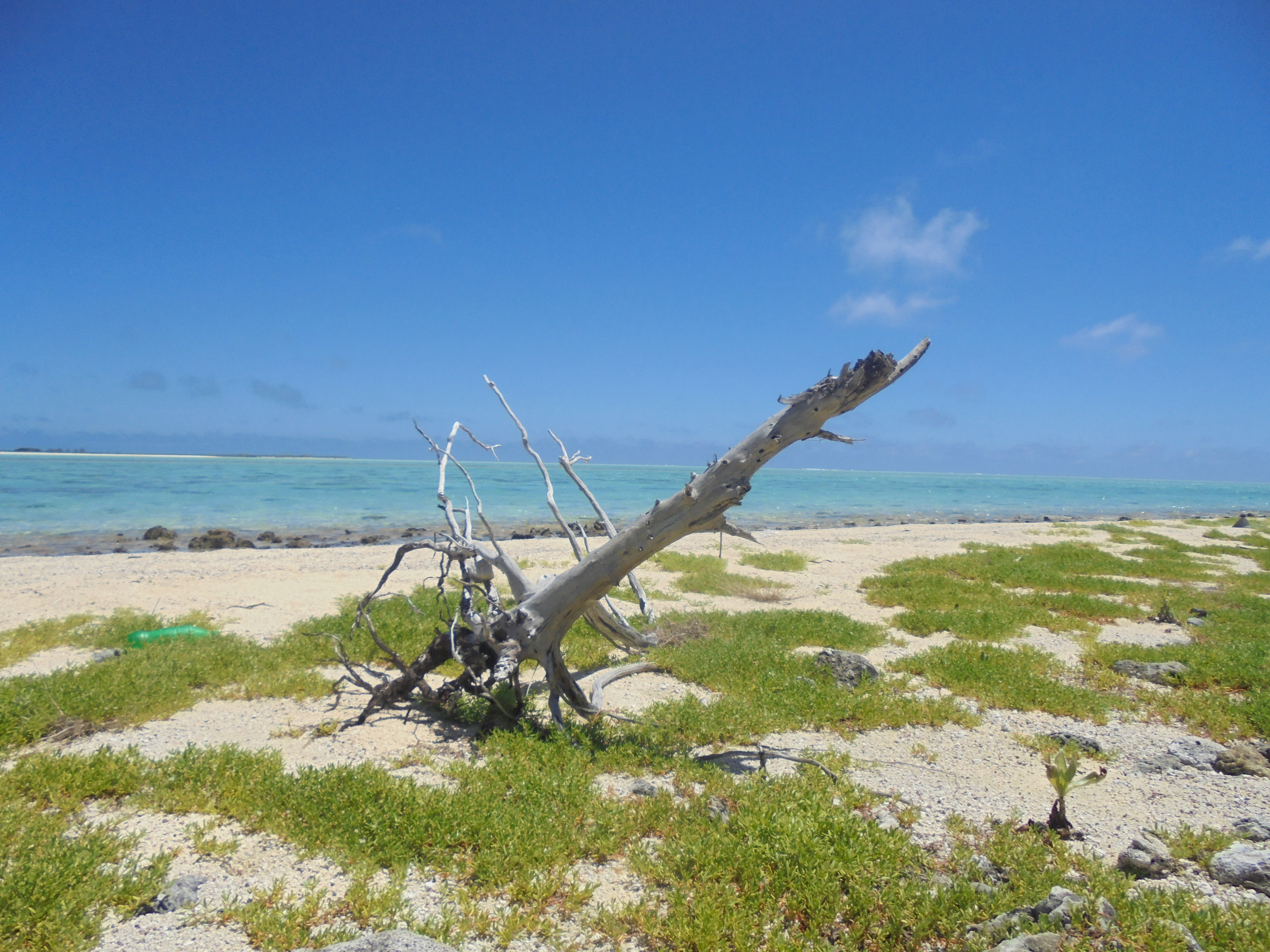
The Thirteen Islands of St Brandon - Images of Île Raphael, Cargados Carajos in Mauritius

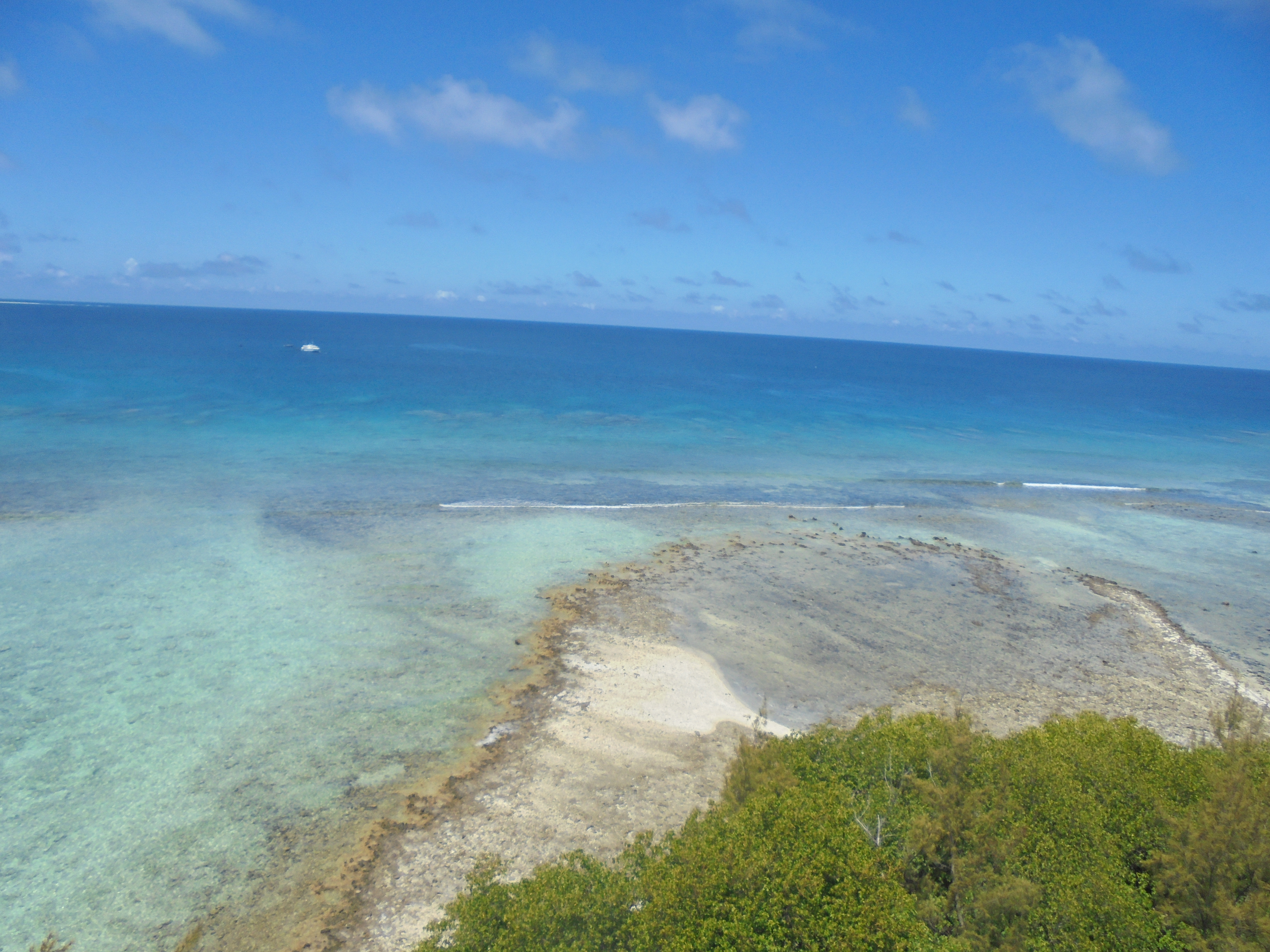
The Thirteen Islands of St Brandon - Images of Île Raphael, Cargados Carajos in Mauritius

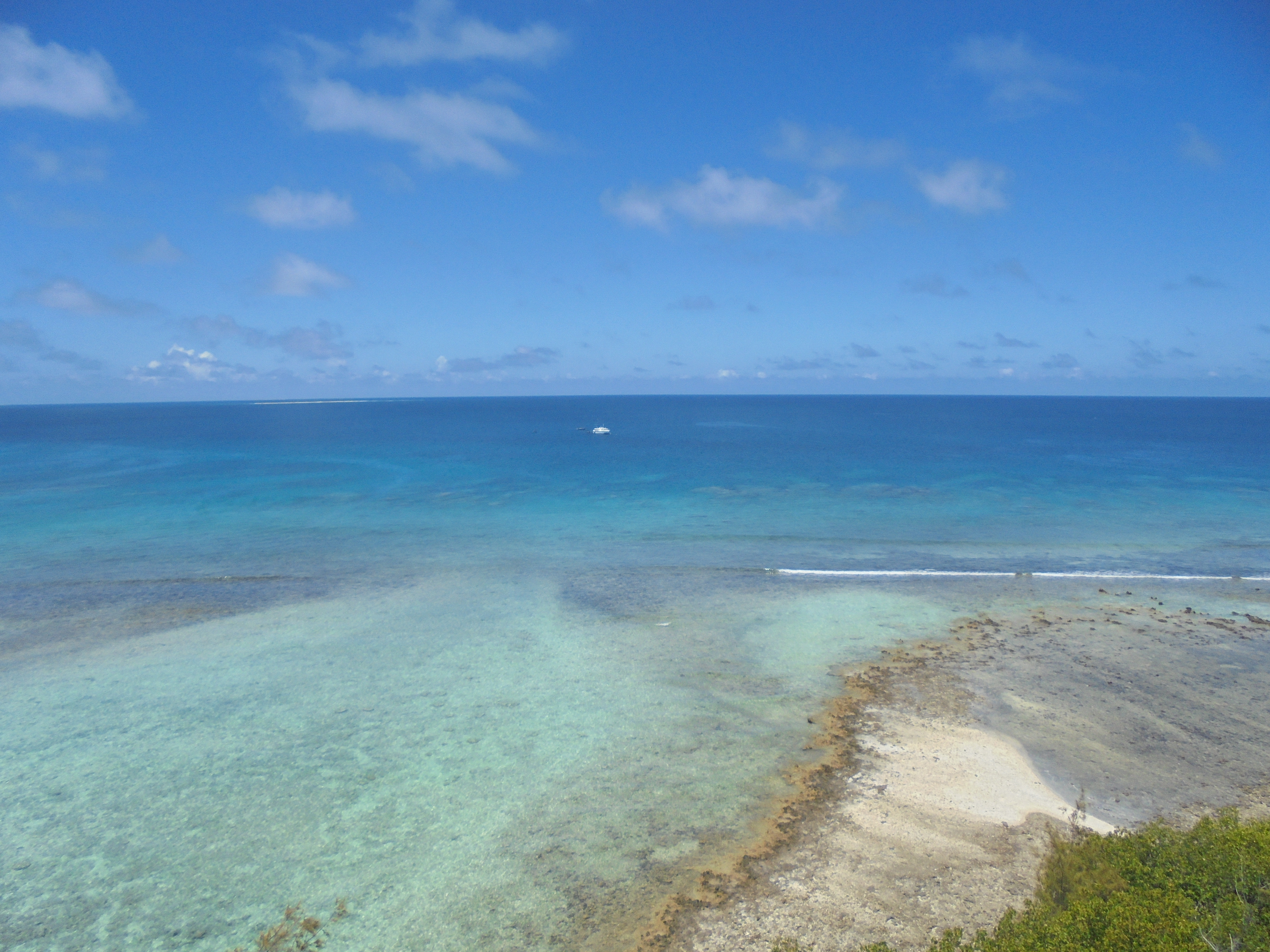
The Thirteen Islands of St Brandon - Images of Île Raphael, Cargados Carajos in Mauritius

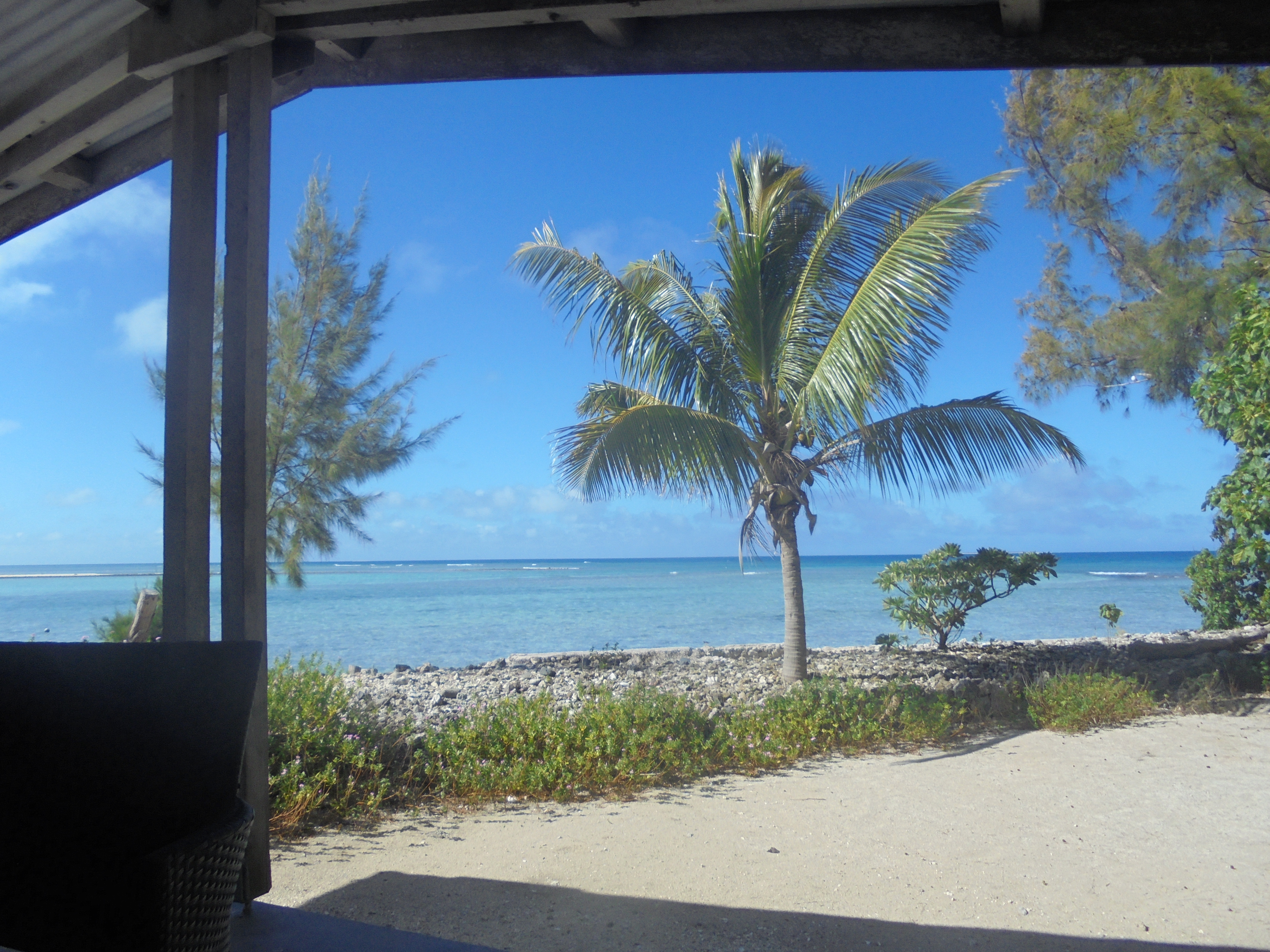
The Thirteen Islands of St Brandon - Images of Île Raphael, Cargados Carajos in Mauritius

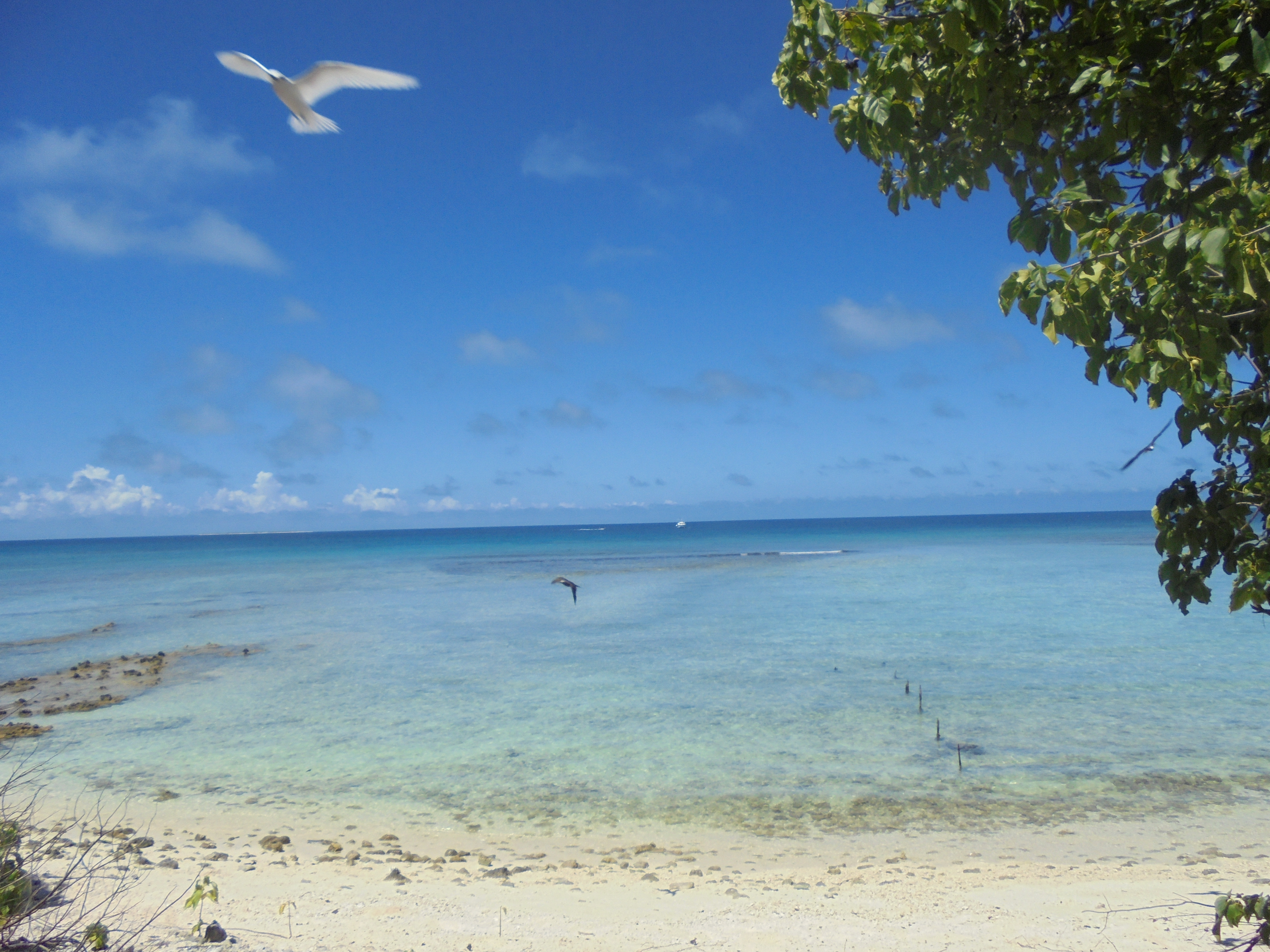
The Thirteen Islands of St Brandon - Images of Île Raphael, Cargados Carajos in Mauritius

== Protected areas ==
=== National parks ===
- Black River Gorges National Park (also part of a greater Biosphere Reserve which includes the Gerald Durrell Endemic Wildlife Sanctuary)
- Bras d'Eau National Park
- Islets National Park

=== Mainland nature reserves ===
- Macchabée-Bel Ombre Nature Reserve, the largest reserve (3,611 ha), formed from six constituent reserves in 1980.
- Corps de Garde Nature Reserve
- Le Pouce Nature Reserve
- Perrier Nature Reserve
- Bois Sec Nature Reserve
- Gouly Pere Nature Reserve
- Cabinet Nature Reserve
- Les Mares Nature Reserve
- Grande Montagne Nature Reserve, Rodrigues (20 ha)
- Anse Quitor Nature Reserve, Rodrigues (34 ha)

=== Offshore islets nature reserves ===
- Ile aux Aigrettes Nature Reserve
- Ile Plate (Flat Island) Nature Reserve
- Ile Ronde (Round Island) Nature Reserve
- Ilot Gabriel Nature Reserve
- Coin de Mire (Gunner's Quoin) Nature Reserve
- Ilot Marianne Nature Reserve
- Ile aux Serpents Nature Reserve
- Ile aux Cocos Nature Reserve, Rodrigues (14 ha)
- Ile aux Sables Nature Reserve, Rodrigues (8 ha)

=== Marine parks ===
- Blue Bay Marine Park

=== Botanical gardens ===
- Pamplemousses Botanical Garden
- Monvert Nature Park
- Vallée d'Osterlog Botanical Garden
- Curepipe Botanic Gardens

=== Other protected areas ===
- Ebony Forest Chamarel
- François Leguat Giant Tortoise and Cave Reserve, Rodrigues
- Vallee de Ferney Conservation Trust
- Rivulet Terre Rouge Estuary Bird Sanctuary
- La Vallee des Couleurs Nature Park
- St Brandon

=== See also ===
- Albatross Island, St. Brandon
- Avocaré Island
- Cargados Carajos
- Carl G. Jones
- Conservation status
- Constitution of Mauritius
- Emphyteutic lease
- France Staub
- Geography of Mauritius
- Gerald Durrell
- History of Mauritius
- Hope Spots: marine areas rich in biodiversity
- Île Raphael
- Île Verronge
- Important marine mammal area
- Islets of Mauritius
- L'Île Coco
- L'île du Gouvernement
- L'île du Sud
- Law of the sea
- List of mammals of Mauritius
- List of marine fishes of Mauritius
- List of national parks of Mauritius
- Mare aux Songes
- Marine park
- Marine spatial planning
- Mascarene Islands
- Mauritian Wildlife Foundation
- Mauritius
- Outer Islands of Mauritius
- Permanent grant
- Raphael Fishing Company
- Special Protection Area
- St. Brandon
- The Saint Brandon Conservation Trust
