= List of national parks of Mauritius =

There are 3 national parks in Mauritius. Black River Gorges National Park, established in 1994, is the oldest and by far most visited.

== National parks ==
- Black River Gorges National Park
- Bras d'Eau National Park
- Islets National Park

== See also ==
- Wildlife of Mauritius
