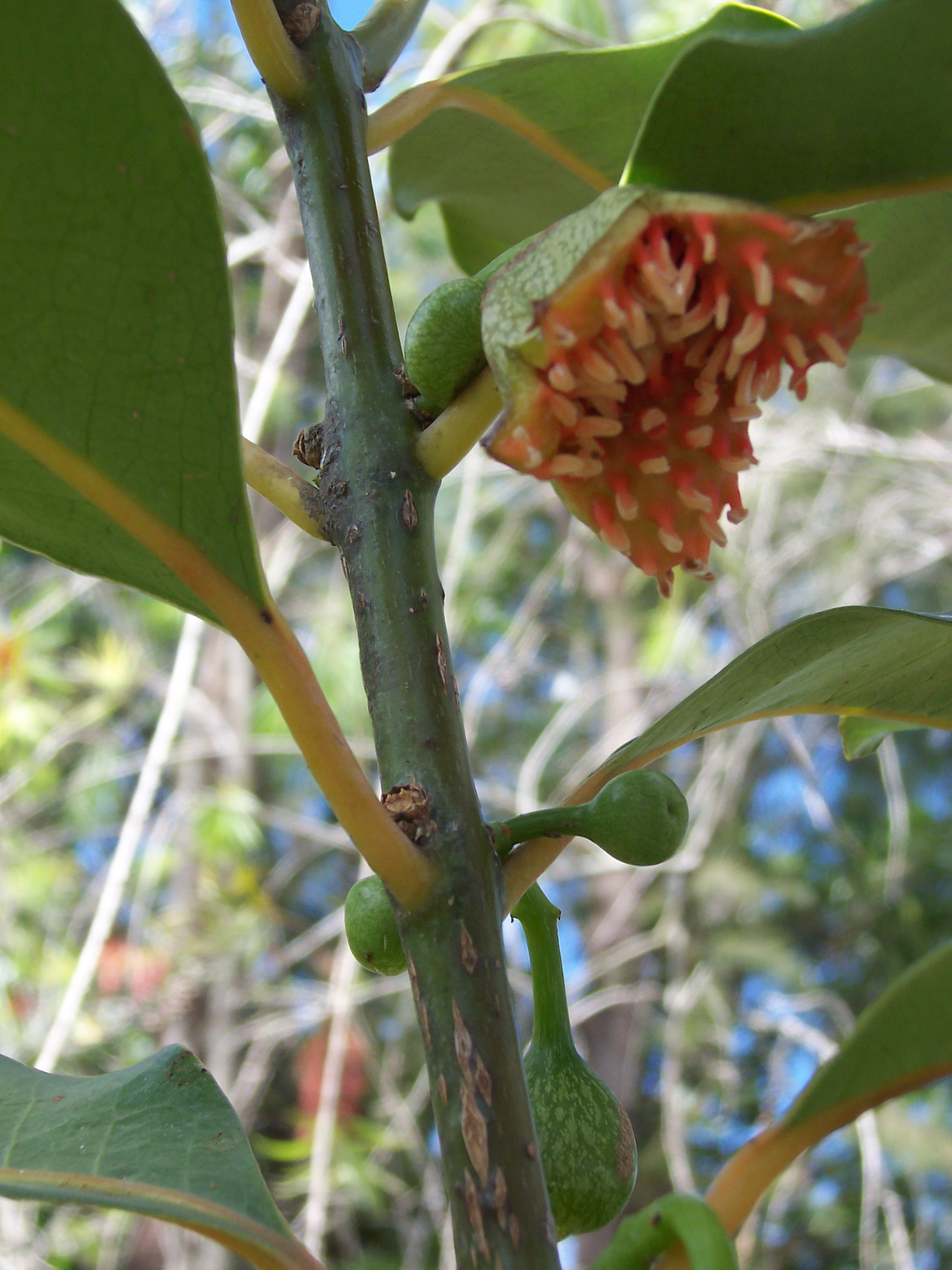
- T. elliptica, male flowers

Scientific classification
- Kingdom: Plantae
- Clade: Tracheophytes
- Clade: Angiosperms
- Clade: Magnoliids
- Order: Laurales
- Family: Monimiaceae
- Genus: Tambourissa; Sonn.

Type species
- Tambourissa quadrifida Sonn.

Synonyms
- Ambora Juss., 1789; Mithridatea Comm. ex Schreb., 1791; Schrameckia Danguy, 1922; Phanerogonocarpus Cavaco, 1958

= Tambourissa =

Genus of plants

Tambourissa is a genus of plant in family Monimiaceae. Its range includes Madagascar, the Comoro Islands, Réunion, and Mauritius. It contains the following accepted species, according to ThePlantList.org:

- Tambourissa alaticarpa Lorence Madagascar
- Tambourissa amplifolia (Tul.) A. DC. Mauritius
- Tambourissa bathiei Cavaco Madagascar
- Tambourissa beanjadensis Lorence Madagascar
- Tambourissa bosseri Jérémie & Lorence Madagascar
- Tambourissa capuronii Cavaco Madagascar
- Tambourissa castri-delphinii Cavaco Madagascar
- Tambourissa cocottensis Lorence Mauritius
- Tambourissa comorensis Lorence Comoro Islands
- Tambourissa cordifolia Lorence Mauritius
- Tambourissa crassa Lorence Réunion
- Tambourissa decaryana Cavaco Madagascar
- Tambourissa dorrii Lorence & Jérémie Madagascar
- Tambourissa elliptica A. DC. Réunion
- Tambourissa ficus (Tul.) A. DC. Mauritius
- Tambourissa floricostata Cavaco Madagascar
- Tambourissa gracilis Perkins Madagascar
- Tambourissa hildebrandtii Perkins Madagascar
- Tambourissa humbertii Cavaco Madagascar
- Tambourissa kirkii Cavaco Comoro Islands
- Tambourissa lastelliana (Baill.) Drake Madagascar
- Tambourissa leptophylla (Tul.) A. DC. Comoro Islands, Madagascar
- Tambourissa longicarpa Lorence Madagascar
- Tambourissa madagascariensis Cavaco Madagascar
- Tambourissa mandrarensis Jérémie & Lorence Madagascar
- Tambourissa manongarivensis Lorence Madagascar
- Tambourissa masoalensis Lorence & Jérémie Madagascar
- Tambourissa moheliensis Lorence Comoro Islands
- Tambourissa nicolliae Jérémie & Lorence Madagascar
- Tambourissa nitida Danguy Madagascar
- Tambourissa nosybensis Lorence Madagascar
- Tambourissa paradoxa Perkins Comoro Islands
- Tambourissa parvifolia Baker Madagascar
- Tambourissa pedicellata Baker Mauritius
- Tambourissa peltata Baker Mauritius
- Tambourissa perrieri Drake Madagascar
- Tambourissa purpurea (Tul.) A. DC. Madagascar
- Tambourissa quadrifida Sonn. Mauritius
- Tambourissa rakotozafyi Lorence & Jérémie Madagascar
- Tambourissa religiosa A. DC. Madagascar
- Tambourissa sieberi (Tul.) A. DC. Mauritius
- Tambourissa tau Lorence Mauritius
- Tambourissa thouvenotii Danguy Madagascar
- Tambourissa trichophylla Baker Madagascar
- Tambourissa uapacifolia Cavaco Madagascar
