= Tambourissa cocottensis =

Conservation status
- Critically Endangered (IUCN 2.3)

Scientific classification
- Kingdom: Plantae
- Clade: Tracheophytes
- Clade: Angiosperms
- Clade: Magnoliids
- Order: Laurales
- Family: Monimiaceae
- Genus: Tambourissa
- Species: T. cocottensis

Binomial name
- Tambourissa cocottensis Lorence

Species of flowering plant

Tambourissa cocottensis, commonly known as Bois Tambour is a species of plant in the Monimiaceae family. The only population (less than 50 individuals and decreasing) is endemic to the summit Montagne Cocotte, Mauritius (with an average annual precipitation of 5000 mm).

== Description ==
Small tree 4–5 m. A monoecious species. Leaves opposite to subopposite, petitolate, glabrous, petioles 7–20 mm by 1–2 mm, lamina subcoriaceous, elliptic, 45–105 mm by 15–40 mm, the apex shortly acute to shortly accuminate, the tip indurated, the base acutely cuneate, slightly decurrent. New growth glabrous. Androceous flowers, solitary or in fascicles of two, cauliflorous. Immature fruiting receptacle globose-urceolate, 15 mm in diameter by 12 mm long. Mature fruiting receptacle and carpels unknown.

== Ecology ==
T. cocottensis closely resembles T. tetragona in certain aspects such as cauliflory, leaf size, -margin, -texture, -shape or -venation. However, unlike T. tetragona, T. cocottensis' stems and petioles are winged. There are also differences in the flower structure.

=== Threats ===
In 1979, there were only four individuals known. They were in different stages of growth, suggesting that regeneration took place in previous years. In August of the same year, the two largest plants were in bud, both being gynoecious. Unfortunately, there were no male (androecious) trees found in the species' natural habitat. A poor pollination rate further decreases the chances for this species surviving without help from humans. Fruits were last recorded in 1979. T. cocottensis is now (together with T. tetragona) a relicted species, limited to the summit of Mt. Cocotte.

Despite by law being in a nature reserve, the forests of Mt. Cocotte have been highly degraded and thus are highly vulnerable to neophytes.

== See also ==
- Wildlife of Mauritius
