= Tambourissa pedicellata =

Conservation status
- Critically Endangered (IUCN 2.3)

Scientific classification
- Kingdom: Plantae
- Clade: Tracheophytes
- Clade: Angiosperms
- Clade: Magnoliids
- Order: Laurales
- Family: Monimiaceae
- Genus: Tambourissa
- Species: T. pedicellata

Binomial name
- Tambourissa pedicellata Baker

Species of plant

Tambourissa pedicellata is a species of plant in the Monimiaceae family. It is endemic to Mauritius. Its natural habitat is subtropical or tropical dry forests.
