= Black River Gorges National Park =

National park in Mauritius

Coordinates: 20°25′S 57°25′E

- Black River Gorges National Park
- Interactive map of Black River Gorges National Park
- Location: Mauritius
- Nearest city: Chamouny, Chamarel and La Preneuse
- Area: 67.54 km^{2} (26.08 sq mi)
- Established: June 15, 1994

Black River Gorges National Park is a national park in the hilly south-western part of Mauritius. It was proclaimed on June 15, 1994 and is managed by the National Parks and Conservation Service. It covers an area of 67.54 km^{2} including humid upland forest, drier lowland forest and marshy heathland. Facilities for visitors include two information centres, picnic areas and 60 kilometres of trails. There are four field stations in the park which are used for National Parks and Conservation Service and Mauritian Wildlife Foundation research and conservation projects. It is the largest national park in Mauritius.

== Wildlife ==
The park protects most of the island's remaining rainforest although much of this has been degraded by introduced plants such as Chinese guava and privet and animals such as rusa deer and wild pigs. Several areas have been fenced off and invasive species have been eradicated from them to preserve native wildlife. Many endemic plants and animals still occur in the park including the Mauritian flying fox and all of the island's endemic birds: Mauritius kestrel, pink pigeon, Mauritius parakeet, Mauritius cuckooshrike, Mauritius bulbul, Mauritius olive white-eye, Mauritius grey white-eye and Mauritius fody. The park has been designated an Important Bird Area (IBA) by BirdLife International.

== See also ==
- Wildlife of Mauritius
