= Pandanus sphaeroides =

Scientific classification
- Kingdom: Plantae
- Clade: Tracheophytes
- Clade: Angiosperms
- Clade: Monocots
- Order: Pandanales
- Family: Pandanaceae
- Genus: Pandanus
- Species: P. sphaeroides

Binomial name
- Pandanus sphaeroides Thouars

Species of flowering plant

Pandanus sphaeroides is a species of plant in the family Pandanaceae, endemic to Mauritius.

== Description ==
A very variable species depending on habitat. It is usually a low (5-7m), slender, branched tree. The leaves are stiff, ascending, yellow-green and have white or brown leaf spines on the margins and on the apical half of the leaf midrib. Some older leaves can bend and droop down though. The leaves are also reduplicate and have a blunt tip.

It has numerous stilt-roots, along the trunk and also along the branches, even as far as the tips.

This species is most easily distinguished by its fruit-head, which has pale blue-green drupes that each have a corky tip.

== Habitat ==
It is endemic to Mauritius, and still common in some of the highland wetlands and thickets.
