= Vallée d'Osterlog =

Botanical garden

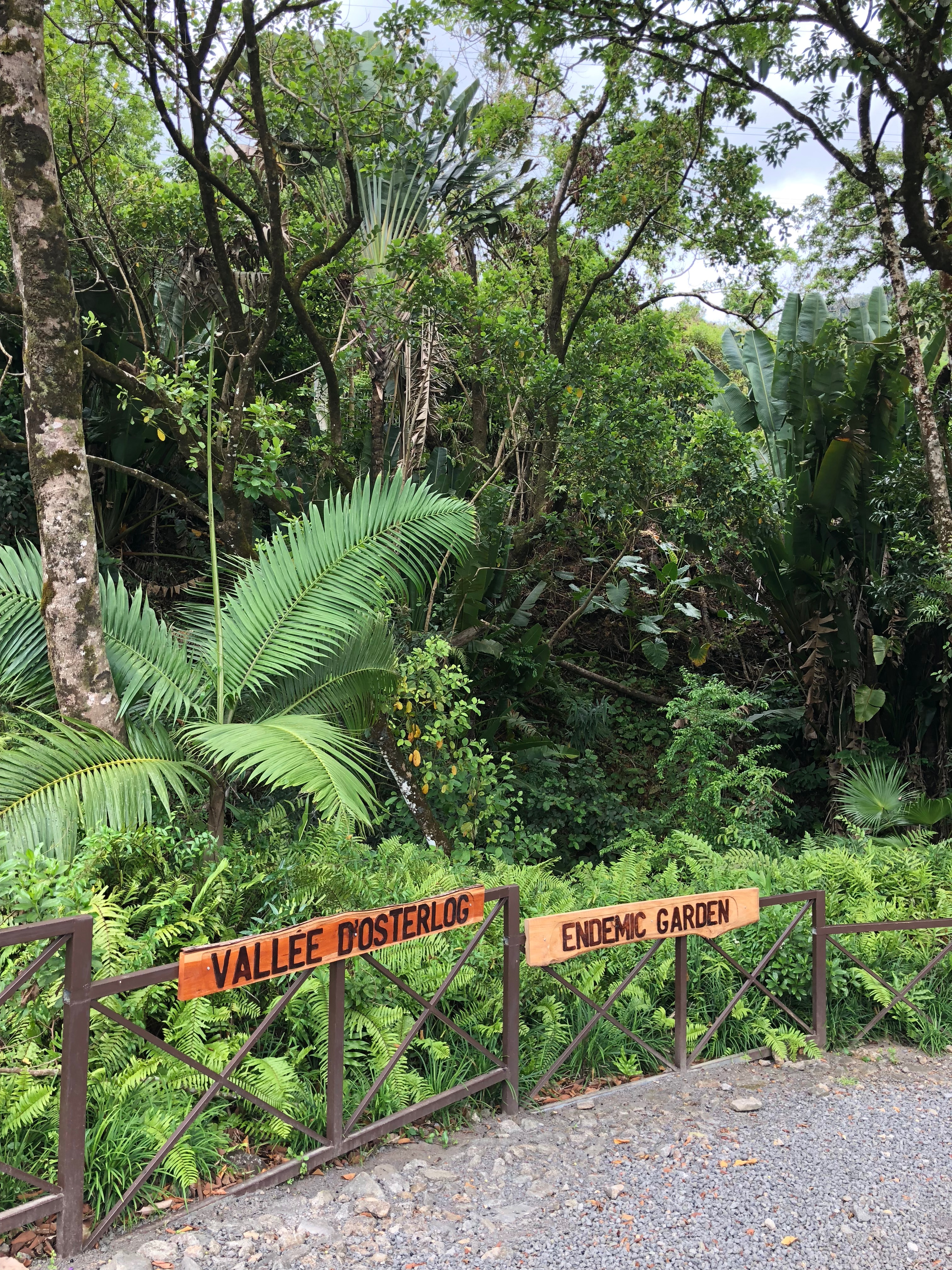
Entrance to the Vallee d'Oosterlog garden

Vallée d'Osterlog or Osterlog Valley is a botanical garden of Mauritian endemic species and a rehabilitated indigenous forest, situated in Le Val, in the south-east of Mauritius.

It was founded on the 11 June 2014.

== Location ==
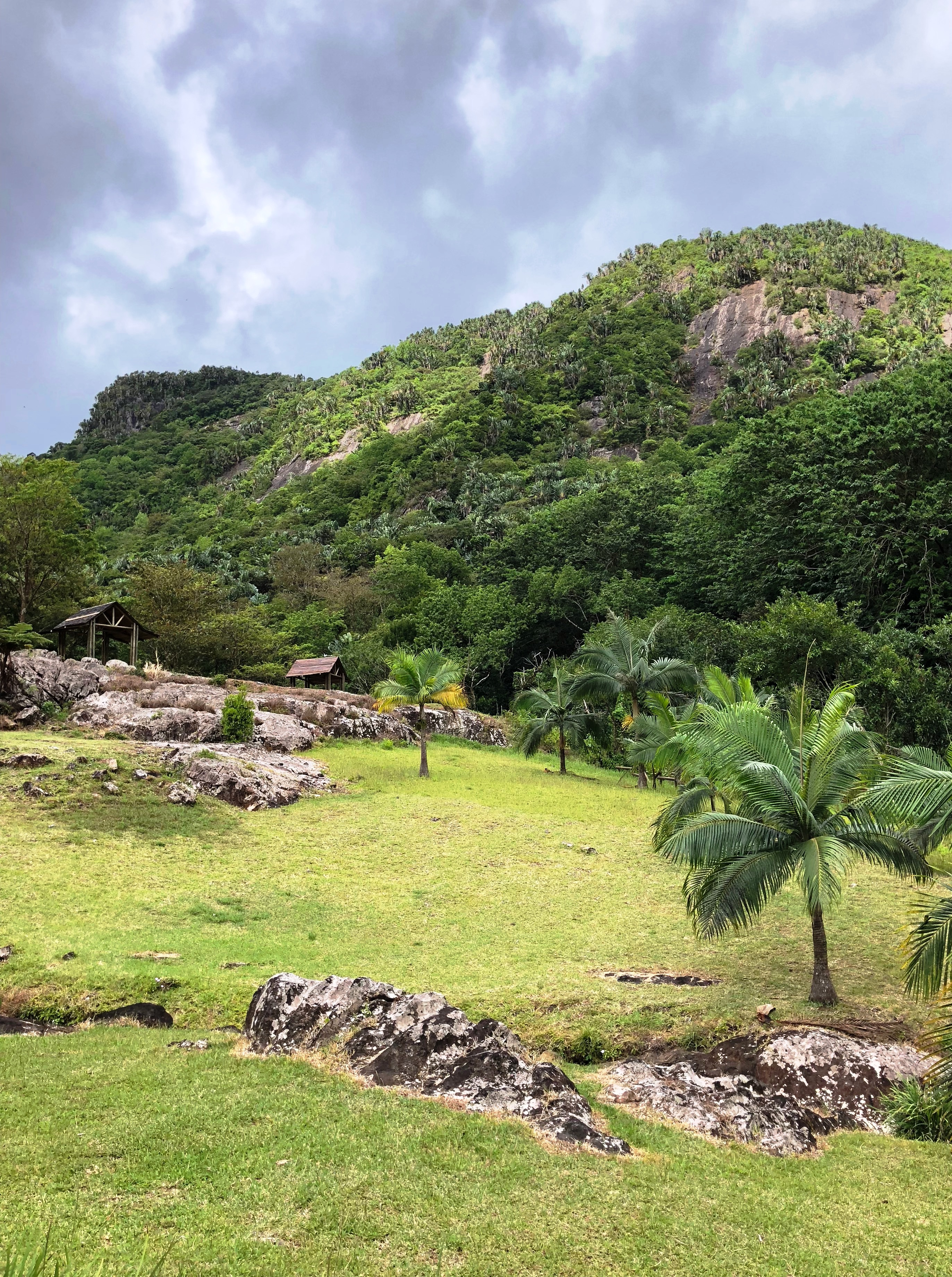

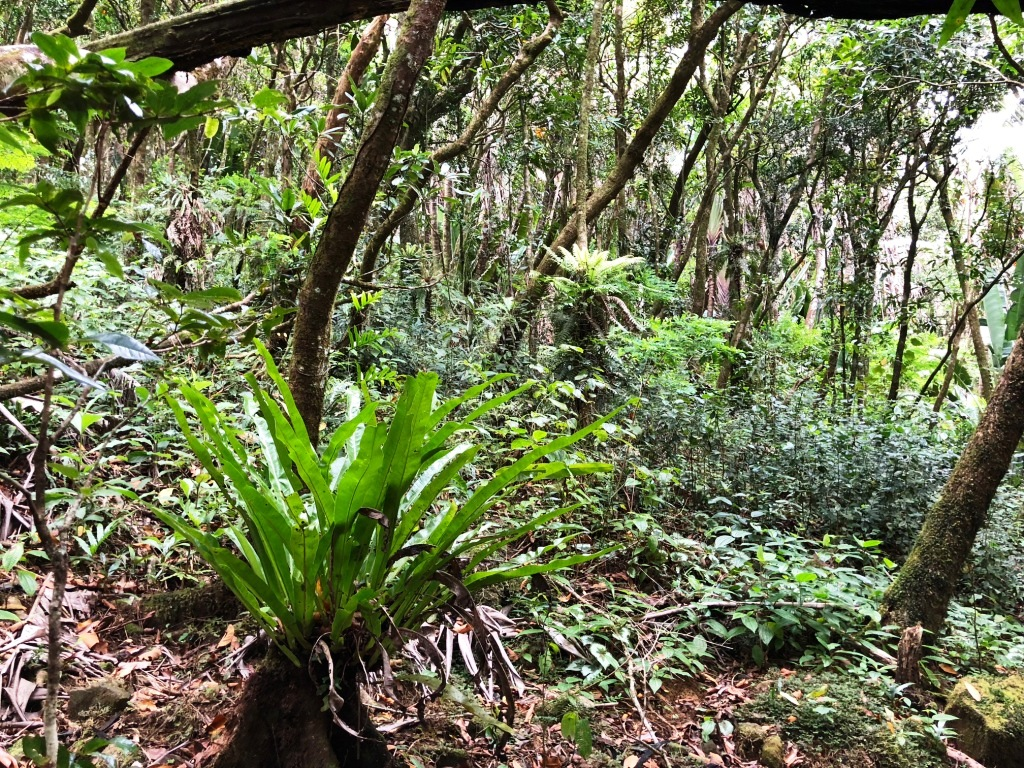
Endemic forest at the Vallée d'Osterlog

The 275 hectare garden & forest is located in the region of Le Val, near Le Val Nature Park in the south-east of the island. It is in the Creole Mountain range, specifically between Mount Lagrave and Mount Laselle. It also lies almost exactly on the border of two districts - that of Grand Port and Moka. It is reached by road from Le Saint, Hubert Village. The offices of the Vallée d'Osterlog Endemic Garden Foundation are in Wooton, Eau Coulée.
