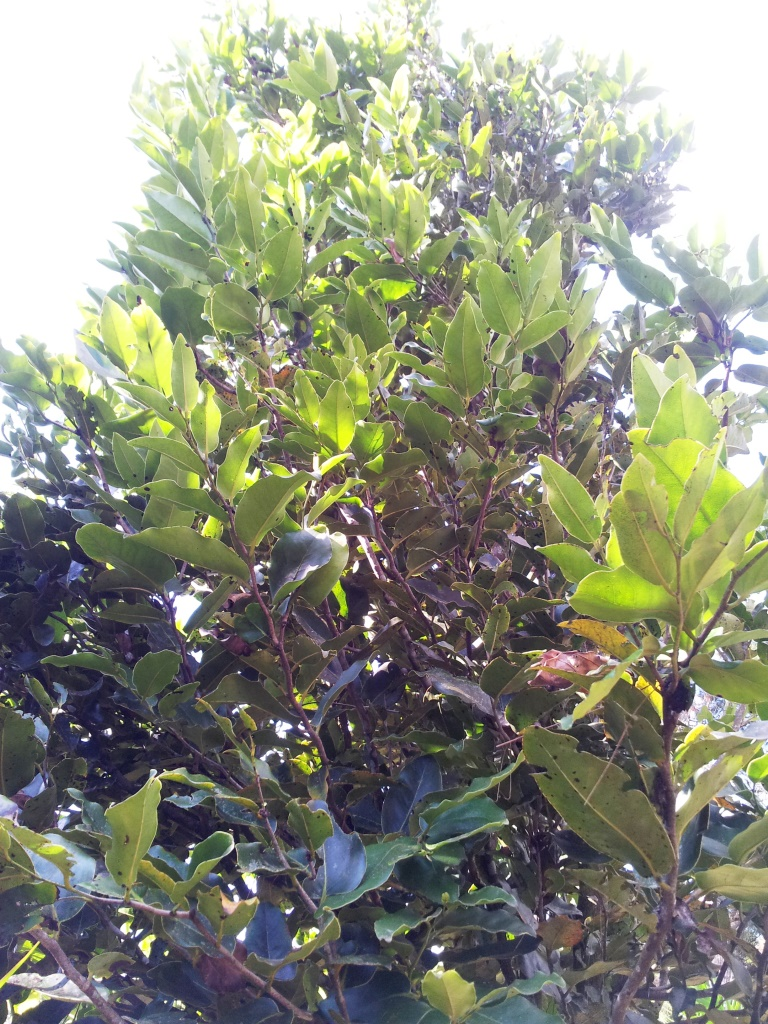
- Foliage of Mauritian ebony - Monvert Nature Park

Conservation status
- Vulnerable (IUCN 2.3)

Scientific classification
- Kingdom: Plantae
- Clade: Tracheophytes
- Clade: Angiosperms
- Clade: Eudicots
- Clade: Asterids
- Order: Ericales
- Family: Ebenaceae
- Genus: Diospyros
- Species: D. tessellaria

Binomial name
- Diospyros tessellaria Poir.

= Diospyros tessellaria =

Species of flowering plant

Diospyros tessellaria (black ebony, bois d'ebene noir or Mauritian ebony) is a species of tree in the family Ebenaceae.

The tree is one of several ebony species endemic to the island of Mauritius in the western Indian Ocean, and was once the most common, widespread ebony species of that island.

== Description ==
The massive, slow-growing, tree can reach up to 20 metres (66 ft) in height. Mature trees can have trunks of over a meter in diameter (However, this species is slow growing and was heavily harvested for timber in the past, so the largest specimens still remaining have trunks of only around 50 cm diameter).

The thick leaves have a dark green surface and a slightly paler underside. A distinctive feature is that the leaf margins and veins are mildly translucent, when held up to the light.

They produce small, white, fragrant flowers and fleshy fruits.

== History ==
Like other species of ebony trees, Mauritian ebony trees yield a dark black ebony wood. In its natural habitat, it was a massive canopy tree - common in the dry and upland wet forests of the island.

=== Exploitation by the Dutch ===
Vice-Admiral Wybrandt van Warwijck landed on Mauritius on September 17, 1598, thus beginning Dutch involvement with the island. In 1638, settlers from the Dutch East India Company (VOC) attempted to colonize the island and set up an organized ebony business to sell the rare black wood. However, due to issues with cyclones destroying the settlement, rats destroying crops, settlers illegally trading with English ships, and slaves revolting commonly, the Dutch left the island in 1710.

=== Ebony as a British Import ===
After the French settled Mauritius in 1721, the British took over the island and Port Louis in 1810. Not only was Mauritius used as a stopping point for ships traveling to British India and other parts of Asia, but now it was also used as a major exporter of goods back to London. While the most popular good from Mauritius was sugar by far, the British did harvest a large portion of the ebony forests. The wood was presumably used for carving and decor in London.

=== Related species ===
This species is one of eleven surviving species of Ebony tree which naturally occur on Mauritius - all of them endemic.

- Diospyros tessellaria (Vulnerable) the most famous and widespread species, occurring right across Mauritius.
- Diospyros angulata Poir. (Extinct, 2000) of intermediate sub-humid to upland wet forest.
- Diospyros boutoniana (Critically endangered) of intermediate sub-humid to upland wet forest.
- Diospyros chrysophyllos (Critically endangered) of intermediate sub-humid to upland wet forest.
- Diospyros egrettarum (Critically endangered) of coastal and dry forests. It has white bark and dark rectangular leaves.
- Diospyros hemiteles (Critically endangered) of intermediate sub-humid to upland wet forest.
- Diospyros leucomelas (Vulnerable) of coastal and dry forests.
- Diospyros melanida (Vulnerable) of the sub-humid to dry forests. It has small, pale leaves and pale grey bark.
- Diospyros neraudii (Vulnerable) of dry forests.
- Diospyros nodosa (Critically endangered) of intermediate sub-humid to upland wet forest.
- Diospyros pterocalyx (Vulnerable) of intermediate sub-humid to upland wet forest.
- Diospyros revaughanii (Vulnerable) of intermediate sub-humid to upland wet forest. It is a small tree with large, densely packed leaves which attach to the stems without stalks.

== Gallery ==
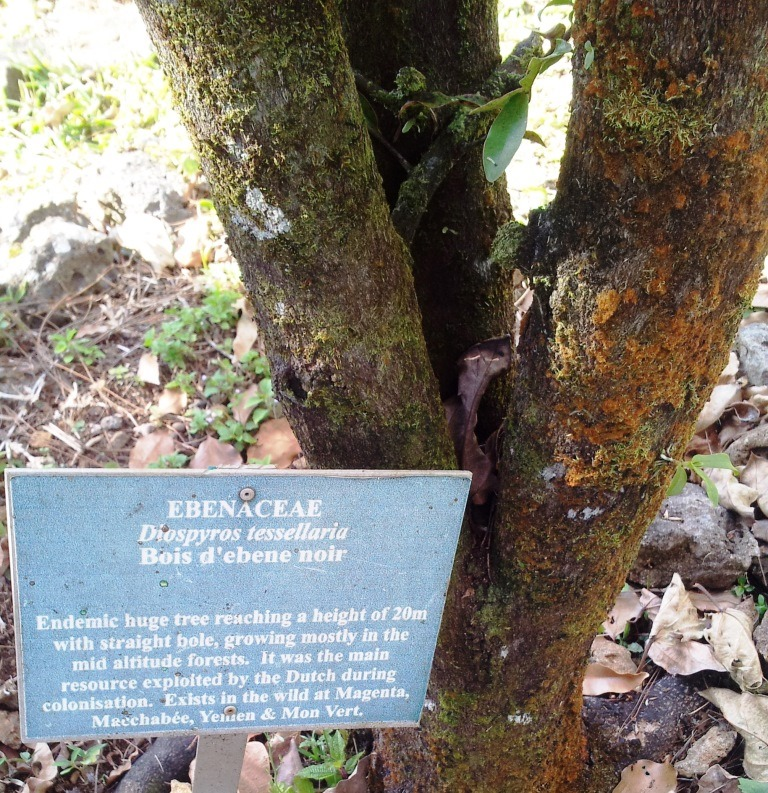
Sign at the foot of a young Mauritian ebony at Monvert gardens

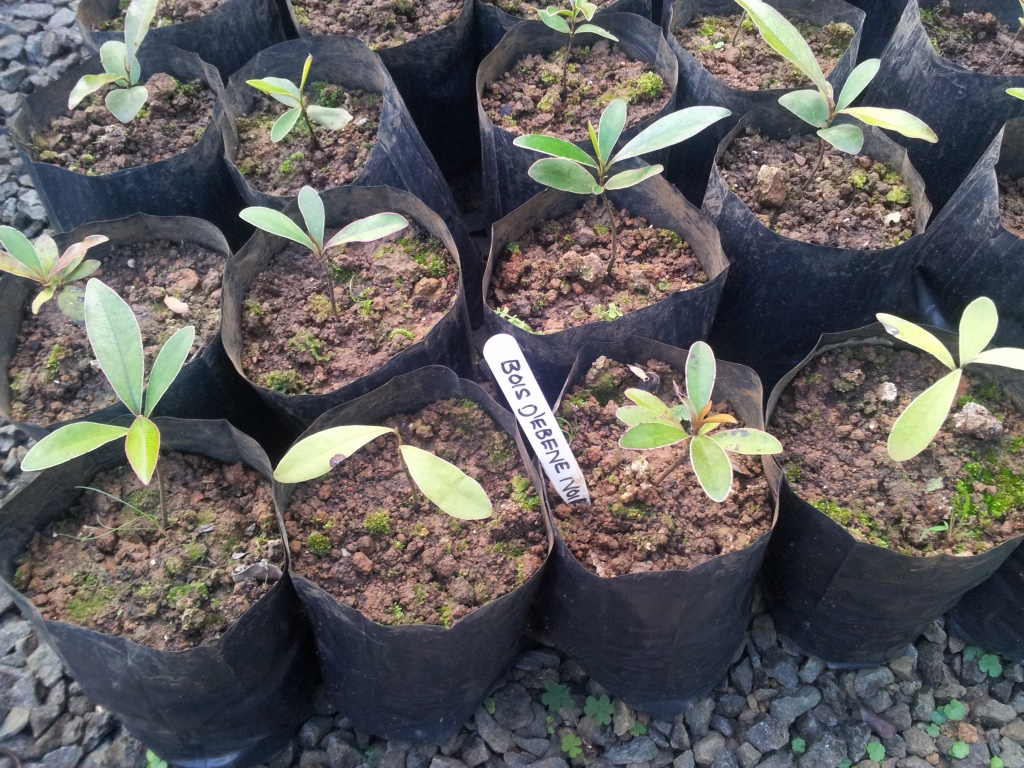
Seedlings in cultivation at Ferney
