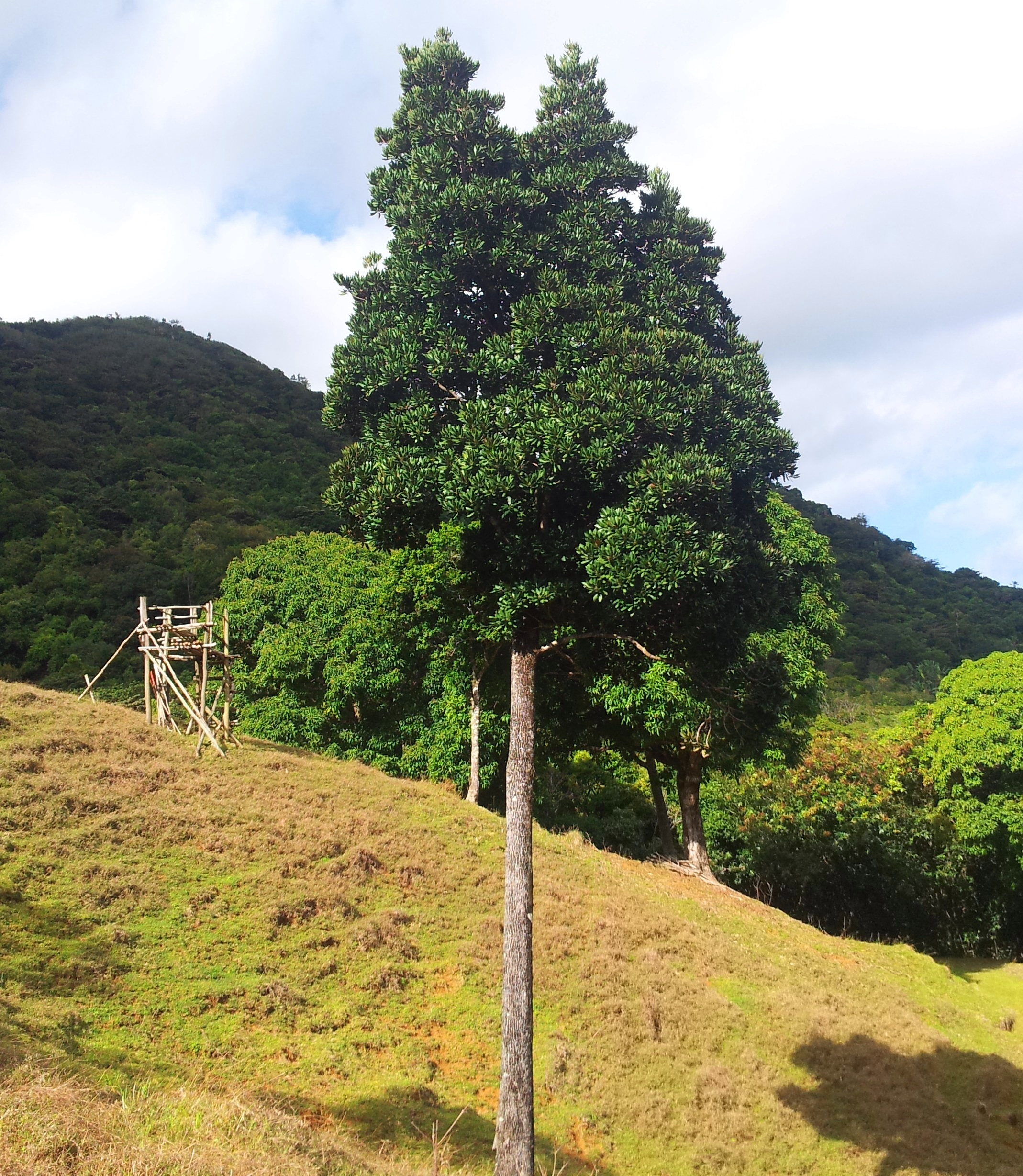
- Young specimen at Vallée de Ferney

Scientific classification
- Kingdom: Plantae
- Clade: Tracheophytes
- Clade: Angiosperms
- Clade: Eudicots
- Clade: Asterids
- Order: Ericales
- Family: Sapotaceae
- Genus: Labourdonnaisia
- Species: L. calophylloides

Binomial name
- Labourdonnaisia calophylloides Bojer

Synonyms
- Mimusops calophylloides (Bojer) Baill.; Labourdonnaisia sarcophleia Bojer; Mimusops calophylloides var. revoluta Cordem.

= Labourdonnaisia calophylloides =

Species of plant in the family Sapotaceae

Labourdonnaisia calophylloides is a species of plant in the family Sapotaceae native to the islands of Mauritius and Réunion in the Indian Ocean.

== Description ==
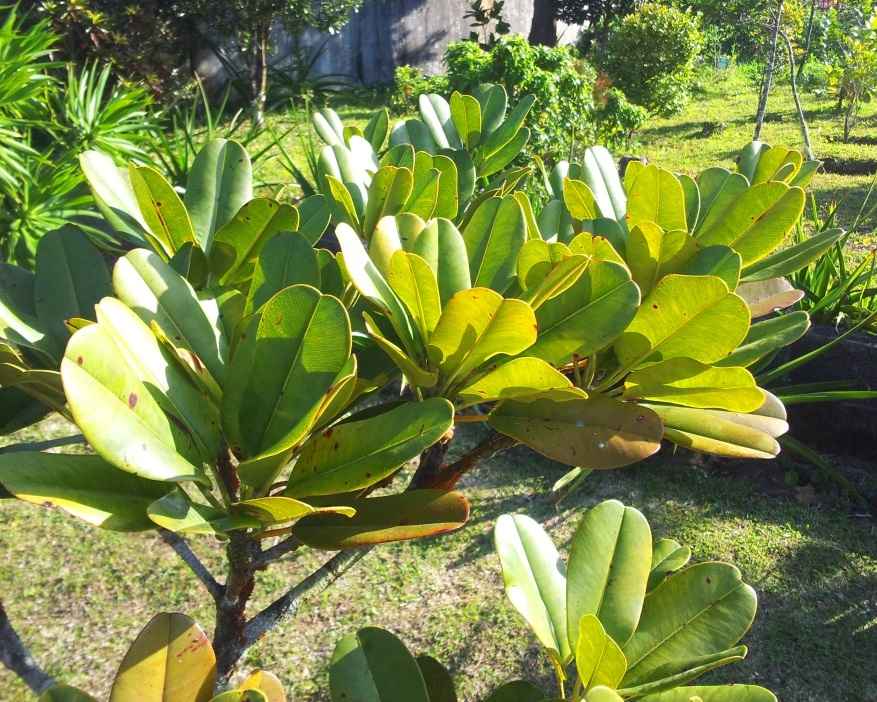
Detail of foliage of a young specimen, at Monvert Nature Park, Curepipe

It reaches heights of 20 meters in the wild, and it develops a very characteristic and ornamental shape, as its leaves bunch together at the very tips of each twig.

== Distribution ==
It was formerly widespread across the Mascarene islands. In the wild it still occurs in Mauritius at Grand Bassin, Petrin, and is locally common in the recovering forests of Monvert.

== Related and similar species ==
It is not to be confused with its relative, the similarly named Labourdonnaisia glauca. Labourdonnaisia tree species can also sometimes be confused with the endemic trees of the genus Sideroxylon (S.puberulum and S.cinereum). However Labourdonnaisia species have parallel venation on their leaves, while the Sideroxylon species have densely netted leaf-venation and strong midribs under their leaves.
