= Perrier Nature Reserve =

Nature reserve in Mauritius

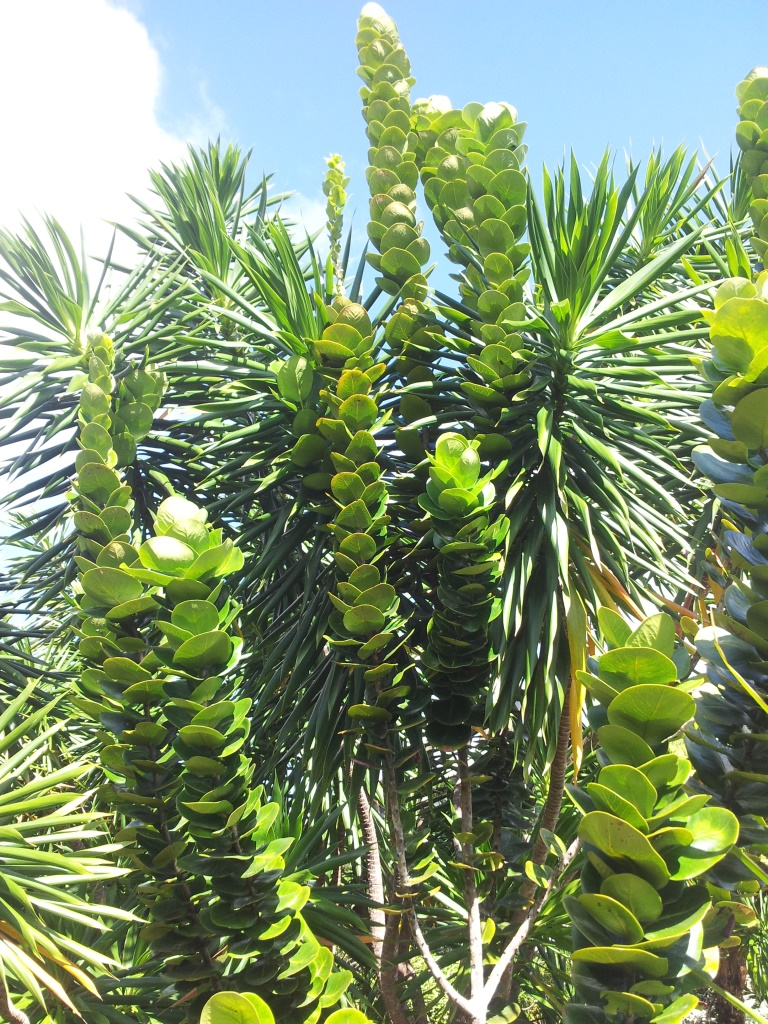
Diospyros revaughanii - one of the rare species protected at Perrier Nature Reserve. (Picture taken at the neighbouring Monvert Nature Park which is open to the public and where some species are displayed)

Perrier Nature Reserve (IUCN IV) is a small nature reserve protecting indigenous plants and primary forest, in the central highlands of Mauritius. It is still closed to the public.

== Indigenous vegetation ==
This CMA nature reserve protects a rare patch of Mauritian primary forest, and a selection of extremely rare endemic plants, such as Diospyros revaughanii, Noronhia macrophylla (one plant surviving, down from two reported in 1980), Syzygium commersonii, Tambourissa peltata, Croton vaughanii, Erythrospermum monticulum, Chionanthus boutoni (only two plants surviving) and the rare and ornate Trochetia blackburniana, among many others.

The vegetation type is "Mauritius Wet Forest" with Sideroxylon dominant, and it has been used as a source of original seed, for rehabilitating surrounding areas. The forest canopy is low (under 10 meters) and composed mainly of "Manglier rouge" (Sideroxylon puberulum) and "Manglier vert" (Sideroxylon cinereum). A very diverse under-storey of species include Aphloia theiformis, Ocotea laevigata and Pandanus eydouxia among others.

== History and management ==
It was designated in 1951, but intensive management of the alien invasive species was only begun in 1969, led chiefly by Conservator of Forests Abdool Wahab Owadally. It incorporates only 1.75 ha (the smallest but most pristine nature reserve in Mauritius), and is located in the central highlands of Mauritius (altitude c.550 m), just north of Mare aux Vacoas.

It is managed by the Mauritian Forestry Service (MFS). It is an extremely sensitive site, and is not yet open to the public.
