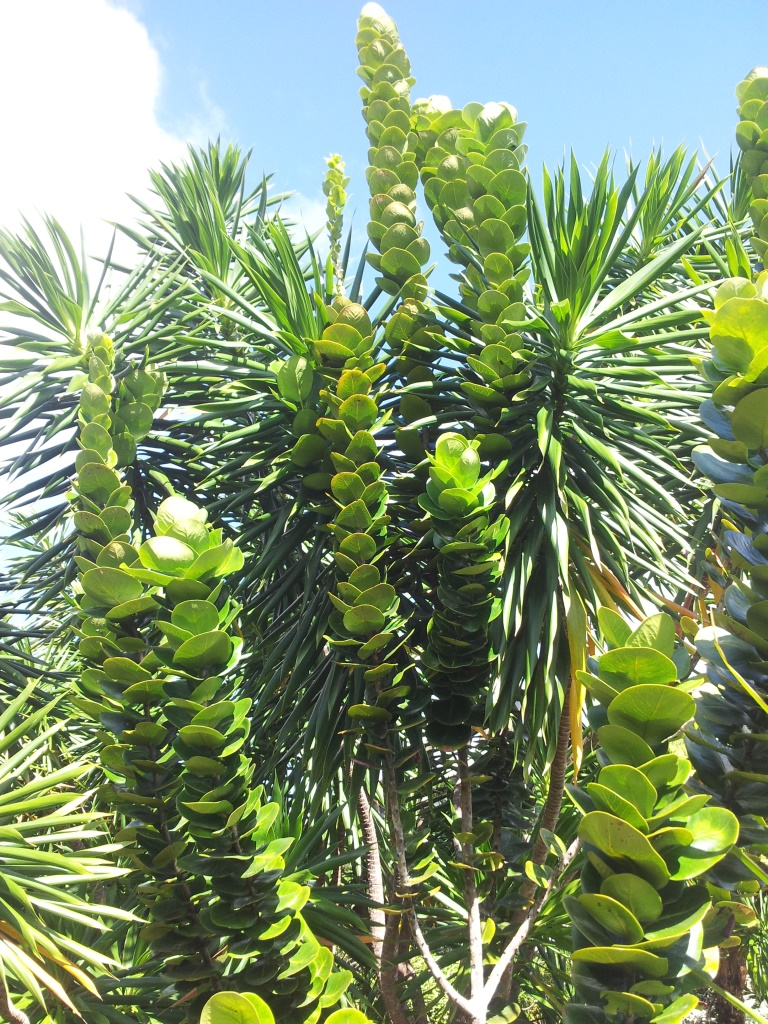
- Foliage of Diospyros revaughanii, at Monvert Nature Park

Conservation status
- Vulnerable (IUCN 2.3)

Scientific classification
- Kingdom: Plantae
- Clade: Tracheophytes
- Clade: Angiosperms
- Clade: Eudicots
- Clade: Asterids
- Order: Ericales
- Family: Ebenaceae
- Genus: Diospyros
- Species: D. revaughanii

Binomial name
- Diospyros revaughanii I.Richardson

= Diospyros revaughanii =

Species of flowering plant

Diospyros revaughanii is a rare species of tree in the family Ebenaceae (ebony).

The tree is one of several species of ebony tree which are endemic to the island of Mauritius, in the western Indian Ocean.

== Description ==
A short, evergreen, shrubby tree, which reaches 4 meters in height. The large, thick leaves have a circular to slightly rectangular shape. They are densely packed along the stems, and attach directly to the tree without any leaf stalks. This is the distinctive feature which can be used to distinguish this tree from the other ebony species of Mauritius.

Like many Mauritian plants, it is heterophyllous and the foliage of juvenile plants is entirely different to that of adult plants. This adaptation is due to the grazing of the (now extinct) giant tortoises of the island. The leaves of young D. revaughanii are therefore longer, thinner, oblong and have petioles (stalks).

Its trunk is thin and it branches from quite low down. Branches and twigs form at an almost perpendicular angle and are quite thick compared to the trunk. The grey bark is often covered in lichens and sometimes even orchids.

Like its relatives, it produces bunches of small, white, fragrant flowers and sweet-smelling, fleshy, sticky, oval fruits (3–5 cm long).

== Distribution ==
This species is endemic to the island of Mauritius - occurring nowhere else in the world. It was formerly common across the island - especially in the sub-humid and wet forest areas, including lowland forests (where it becomes a tall tree) and swampy areas in the highlands (where it stays shorter). It is now restricted to only a few spots in the south west of Mauritius.

Due to its aesthetic appeal however, it is currently sometimes propagated in Mauritius, as an ornamental landscaping tree, for gardens and public spaces.

== Conservation ==
Like other species of ebony, this tree yields a dark black ebony wood. Consequently, it was severely exploited for wood and was decimated from much of its former range. It is now a threatened species and only survives in a few spots in the south-west of the island - around Bel Ombre, Mt Lion, and Perrier Nature Reserve - on exposed ridges and wet highland forest where it has escaped felling. The last patches of this tree's habitat are still threatened.

Although it produces large amounts of fruit with fertile seed, these do not often germinate. The fruits were formerly eaten by the island's (now extinct) species of giant tortoise - and possible also by the dodo - which dispersed the seeds. The absence of these natural seed dispersers could be the reason for the poor seed germination in habitat today.

== Related species ==
This species is one of eleven surviving species of ebony tree which naturally occur on Mauritius - all of them endemic. Several additional species are now extinct.

- Diospyros angulata Poir. (Extinct, 2000) of intermediate sub-humid to upland wet forest.
- Diospyros boutoniana (Critically endangered) of intermediate sub-humid to upland wet forest.
- Diospyros chrysophyllos (Critically endangered) of intermediate sub-humid to upland wet forest.
- Diospyros egrettarum (Critically endangered) of coastal and dry forests. It has white bark and dark rectangular leaves.
- Diospyros hemiteles (Critically endangered) of intermediate sub-humid to upland wet forest.
- Diospyros leucomelas (Vulnerable) of coastal and dry forests.
- Diospyros melanida (Vulnerable) of the sub-humid to dry forests. It has small, pale leaves and pale grey bark.
- Diospyros neraudii (Vulnerable) of dry forests.
- Diospyros nodosa (Critically endangered) of intermediate sub-humid to upland wet forest.
- Diospyros pterocalyx (Vulnerable) of intermediate sub-humid to upland wet forest.
- Diospyros revaughanii (Vulnerable) of intermediate sub-humid to upland wet forest.
- Diospyros tessellaria (Vulnerable) the most famous and widespread species, occurring right across Mauritius. It is a massive canopy tree, has a black, buttressed trunk spotted with white lichen, and thin, tapering leaves.

== Gallery ==
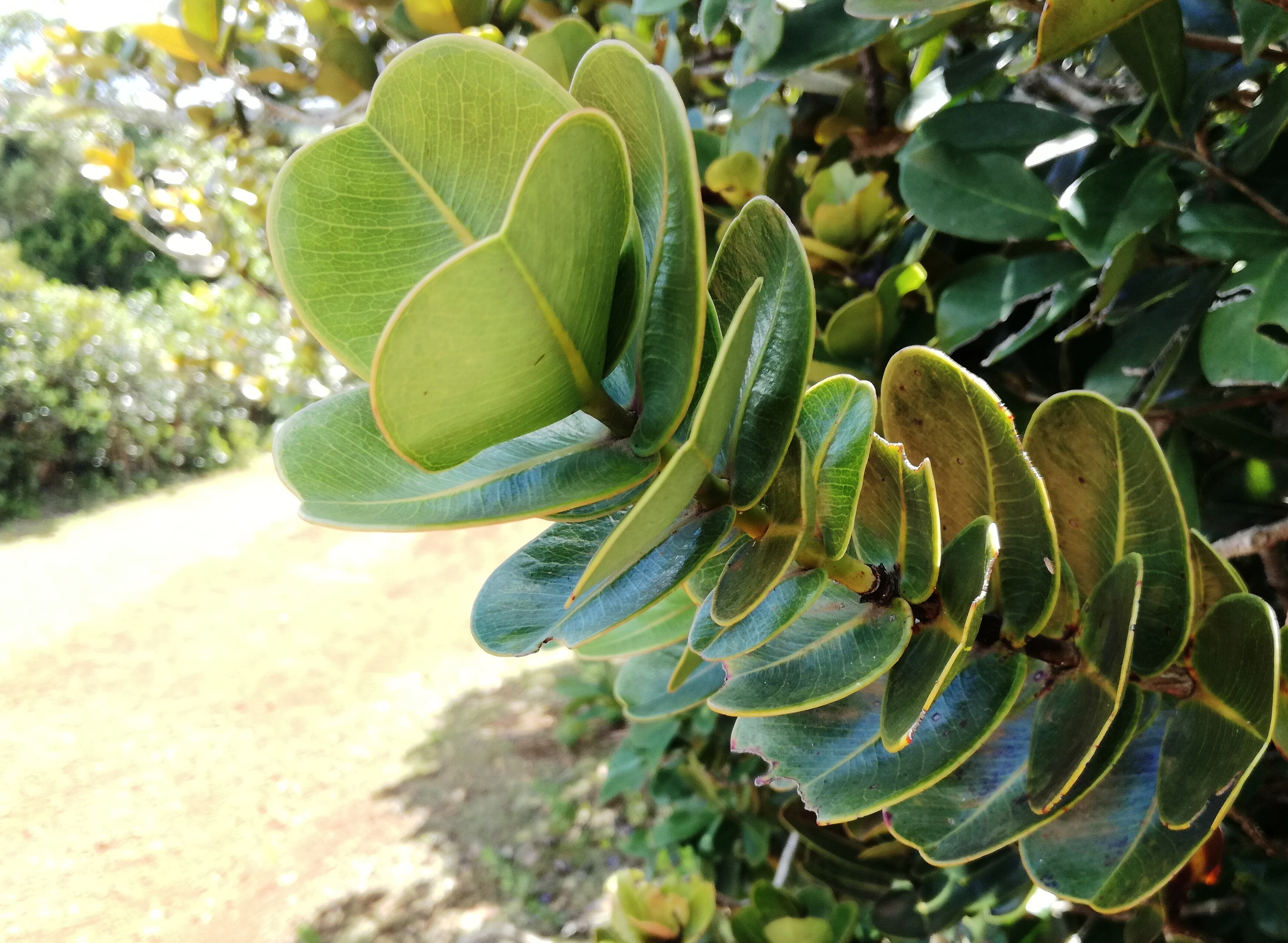
Detail of foliage

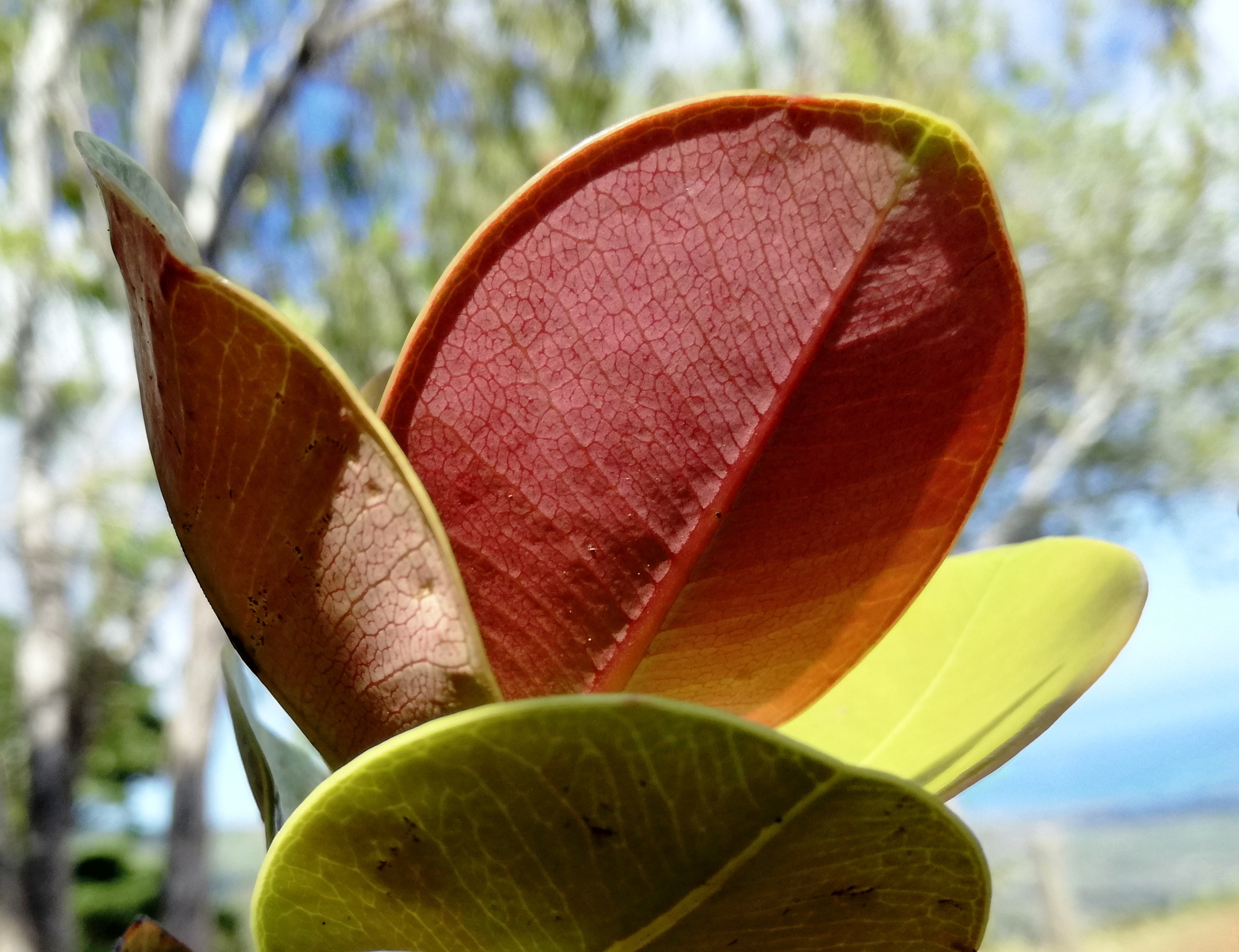
Leaf detail

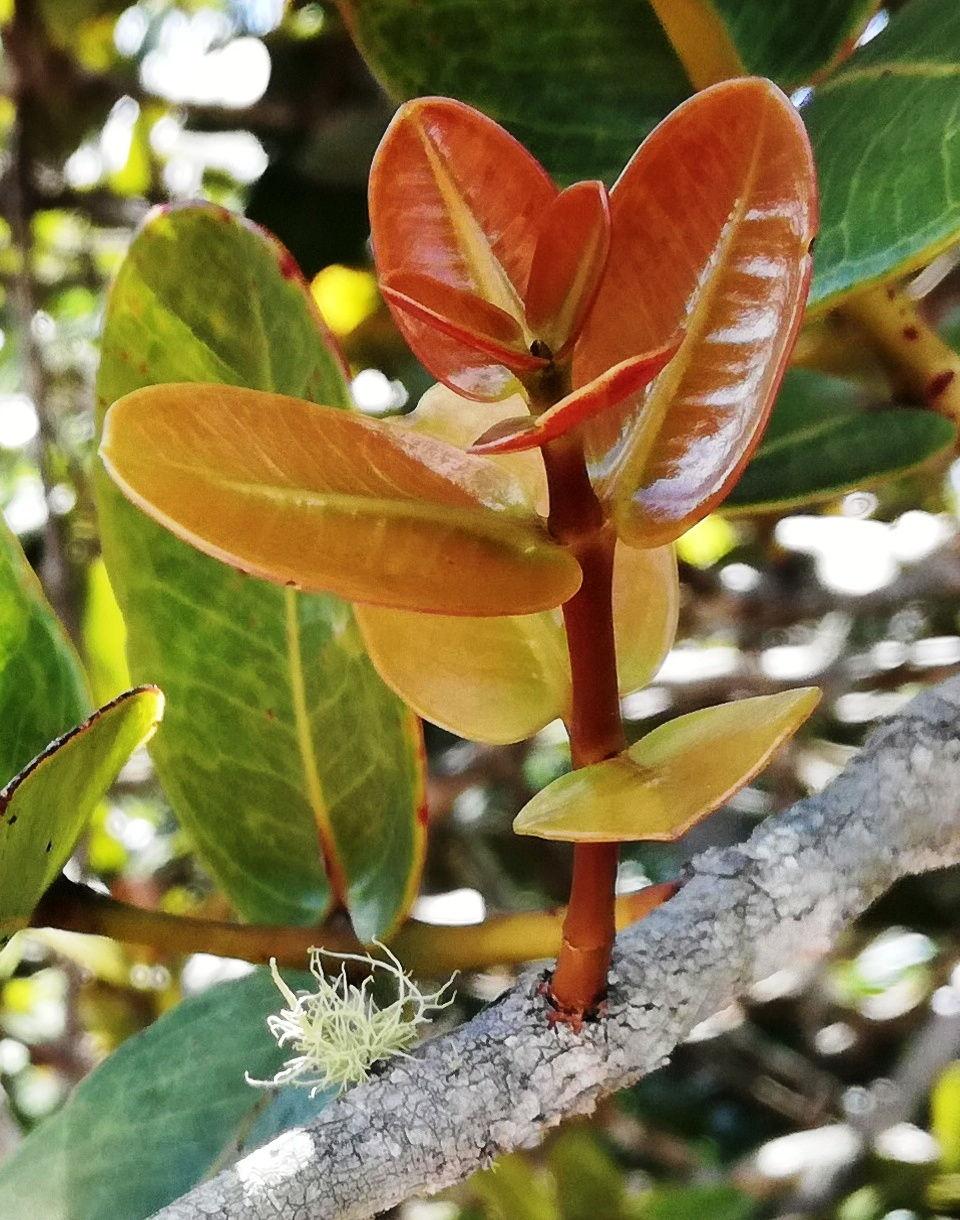
Bright coloured new growth

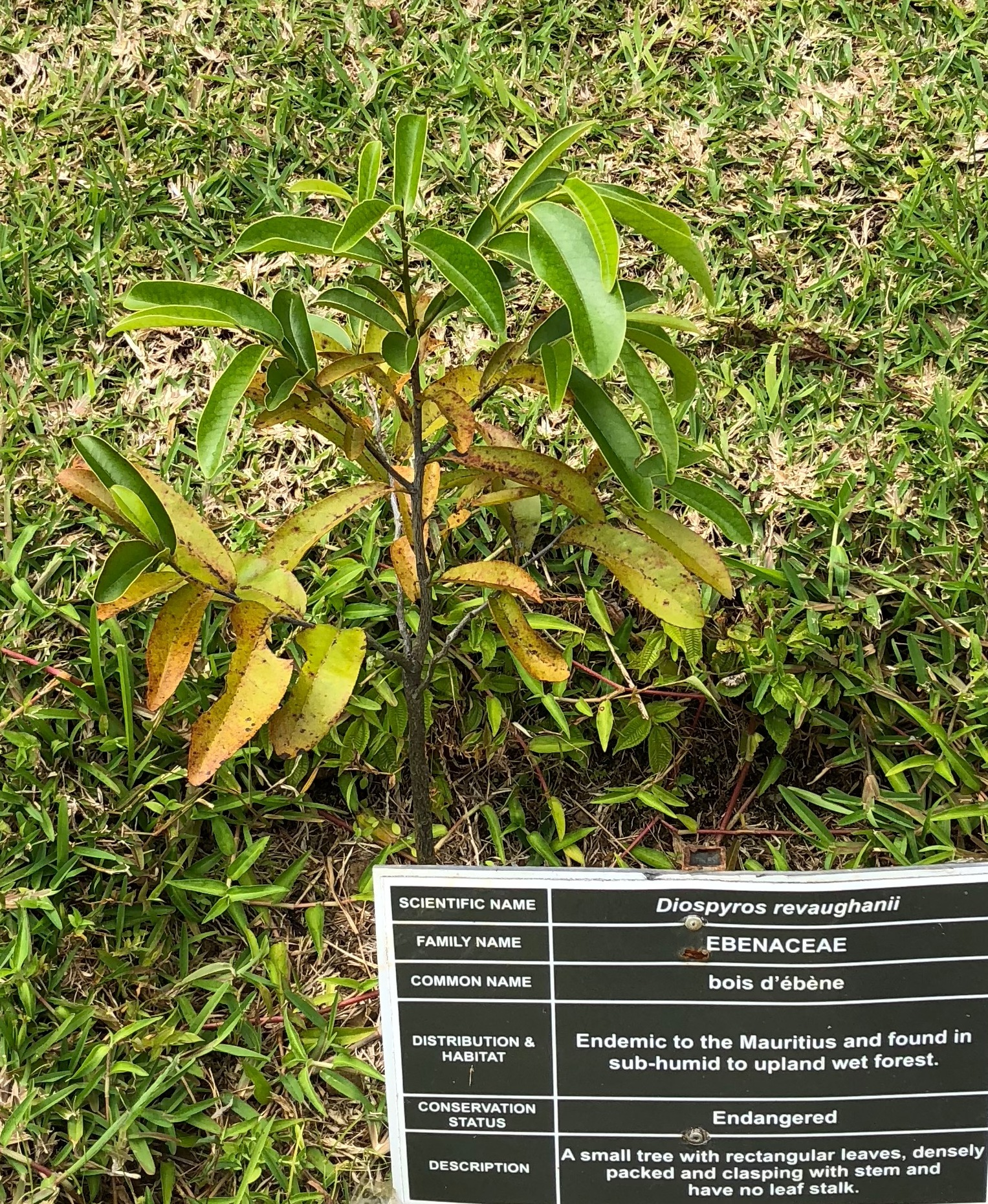
Juvenile plant with its very different, heterophyllous foliage
