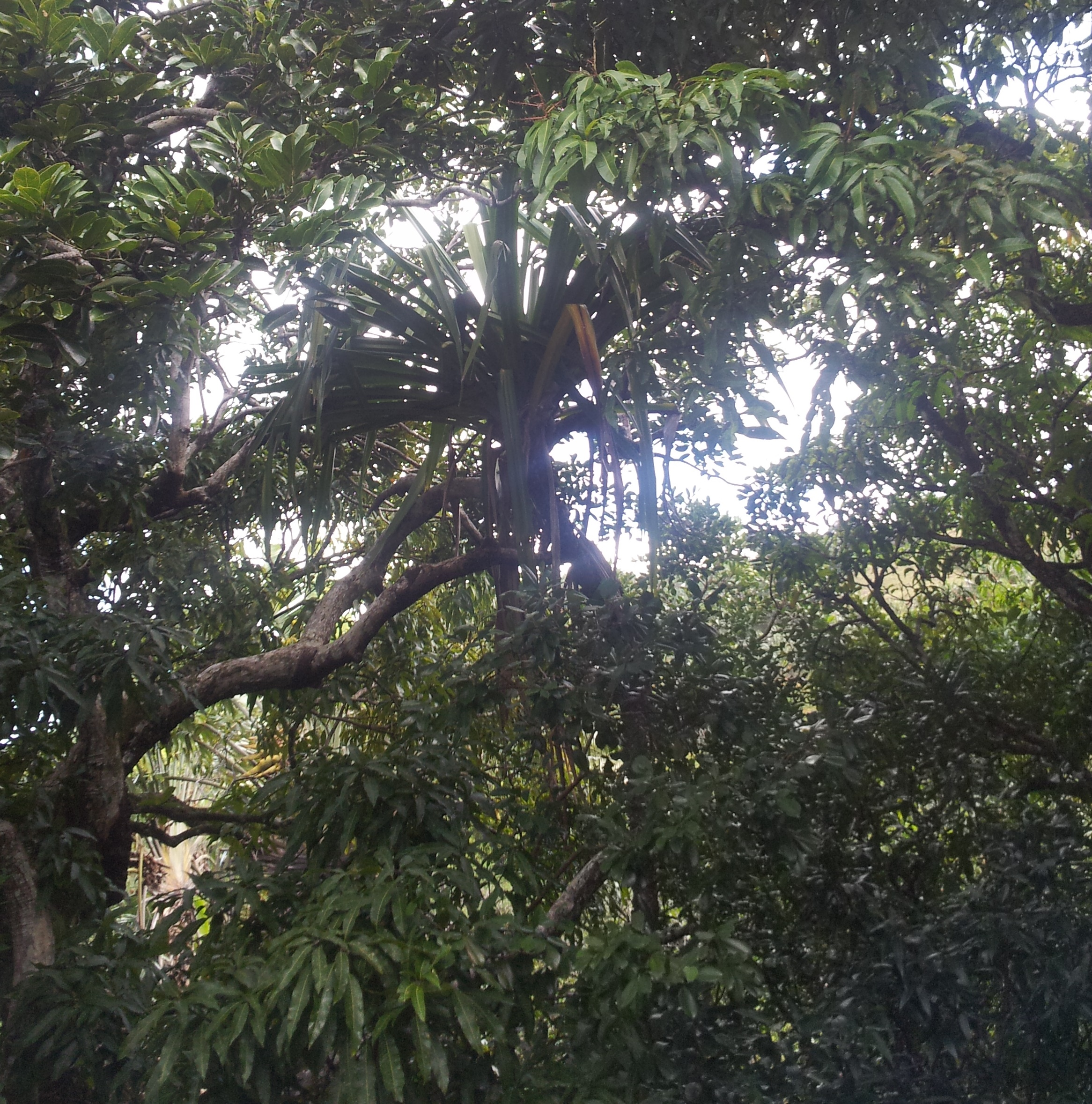

Scientific classification
- Kingdom: Plantae
- Clade: Tracheophytes
- Clade: Angiosperms
- Clade: Monocots
- Order: Pandanales
- Family: Pandanaceae
- Genus: Pandanus
- Species: P. iceryi

Binomial name
- Pandanus iceryi Horne ex Balf.f.

= Pandanus iceryi =

Species of plant

Pandanus iceryi ("Vacoas") is a species of plant in the family Pandanaceae. It is endemic to Mauritius.

== Description ==
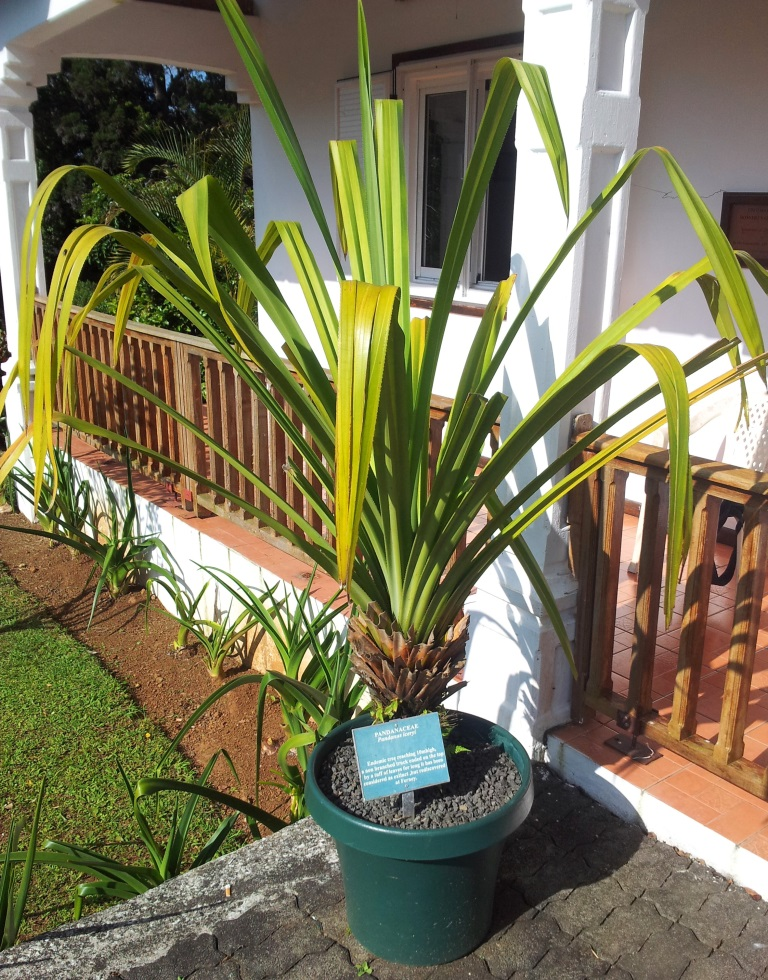
Juvenile plant in cultivation at Monvert Nature Park

This is a tall (10m), unbranched tree - the only Mauritian Pandanus species to grow as one single, tall, palm-like trunk, without any branches. The bright-green leaves end abruptly at the tip, and are armed on the sides with small, white spines. Uniquely, the pale-coloured, oval fruit-head hangs from the main trunk of the plant. Each fruit-head is packed with c.40 drupes.

== Habitat ==
Its natural habitat is dense forest on Mauritius. It was formerly known from several localities around the island, such as Piton du Milieu, Cent Gaulettes and Fressanges. However the habitat at all these localities has been destroyed. It is threatened by habitat loss and it was thought to be extinct. It was rediscovered in the Vallée de Ferney forests with Pandanus macrostigma in 2004. Currently only a few individual plants remain in the wild, although it is now cultivated in Mauritius.
