= Diospyros quaesita =

Conservation status
- Vulnerable (IUCN 2.3)

Scientific classification
- Kingdom: Plantae
- Clade: Tracheophytes
- Clade: Angiosperms
- Clade: Eudicots
- Clade: Asterids
- Order: Ericales
- Family: Ebenaceae
- Genus: Diospyros
- Species: D. quaesita

Binomial name
- Diospyros quaesita Thwaites

Species of flowering plant

Diospyros quaesita or calamander is a species of tree endemic to Sri Lanka. in Sinhala, this tree is called kalu mediriya. This large tree occurs in the evergreen forests of lowland wet zones. This tree is found in 25 forest sites.

The tree is the source of the Calamander variegated ebony, classified as a super luxury class wood. However, there are no edible parts in this tree. Its heartwood is used in medicine to heal wounds.
