= Diospyros leucomelas =

Conservation status
- Vulnerable (IUCN 2.3)

Scientific classification
- Kingdom: Plantae
- Clade: Tracheophytes
- Clade: Angiosperms
- Clade: Eudicots
- Clade: Asterids
- Order: Ericales
- Family: Ebenaceae
- Genus: Diospyros
- Species: D. leucomelas

Binomial name
- Diospyros leucomelas Poir.

Species of flowering plant

Diospyros leucomelas (marble ebony, bois d'ebene marbre or bois d'ebene a veines) is a species of tree endemic to Mauritius.

== Description ==
This low, multi-stemmed tree species resembles the related species Diospyros egrettarum (and less so Diospyros revaughanii) in its dark, rectangular, leathery leaves, rounded leaf-base, very short petiole, and short fruits.

Diospyros leucomelas can be distinguished by the red midribs of its leaves, which remain into adulthood and become especially prominent on the leaf undersides.

== Distribution and habitat ==
Like Diospyros egrettarum, it occurred in coastal and dry forest, all around Mauritius, and was especially common along the eastern coast. In fact, these two species were the only two primarily coastal or lowland species of Ebony in Mauritius. However, D.leucomelas usually grew at mid-altitudes, slightly further from the coast than its close relative.

Currently, D.leucomelas can still be found in the south-west of Mauritius, as well as in some of the mountainous areas in the east.
