= Variegated ebony =

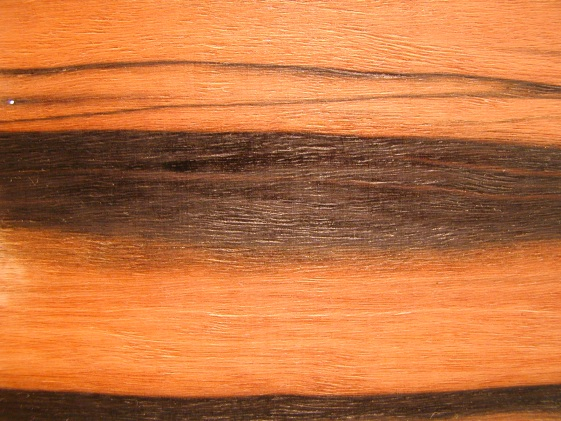

Variegated ebony is a group of valuable hardwood varieties, generally obtained from several species in the genus Diospyros, related to genuine ebony. The wood generally features a pattern of darker and lighter stripes, with the various kinds sometimes being difficult to tell apart. The wood has been used for furniture but also in carpentry, luthiery, and sculpture.

== Coromandel wood ==
Coromandel is a kind of variegated ebony from the species Diospyros melanoxylon native to India and Sri Lanka. The wood features a pattern of stripes in black and brown. The name is derived from the Coromandel Coast in India from where it was first exported. It makes up the majority of timber referred to as East Indian ebony.

== Calamander wood ==
Calamander is a variegated ebony from the species Diospyros quaesita endemic to Sri Lanka. The wood is similar to coromandel, from whose name calamander is derived, and the wood names are sometimes considered synonymous.

The use of calamander wood has led to extensive logging of the trees in the past, leaving D. quaesita a vulnerable species. Presently, the availability of calamander wood is limited and antique calamander furniture is highly prized, so recycling it is an unlikely proposition.

== Macassar ebony ==
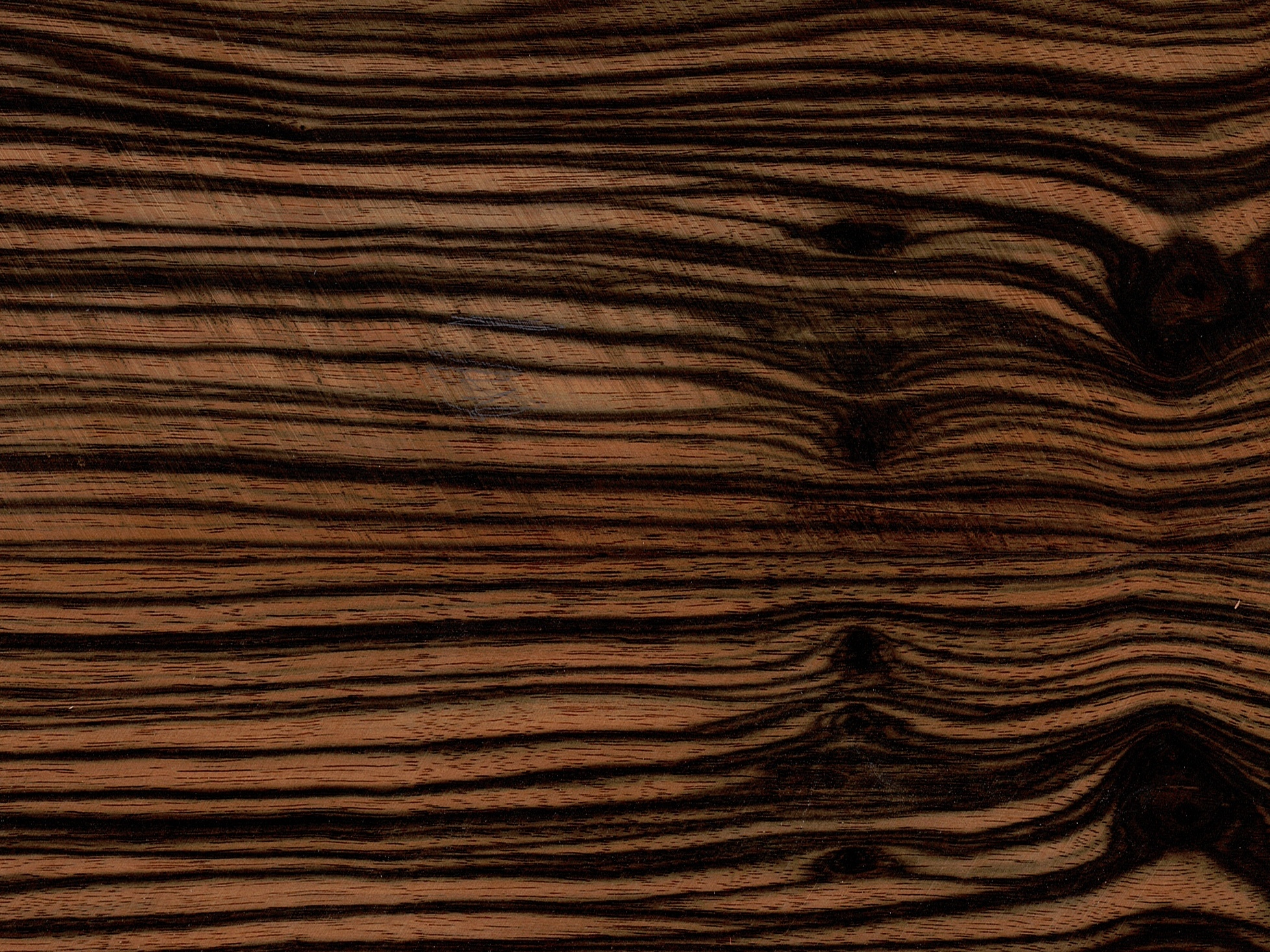
Bookmatched veneer

Macassar ebony is obtained from Diospyros celebica, endemic to the island of Sulawesi of Indonesia. It is named after the city of Makassar, involved in the export of this wood.
