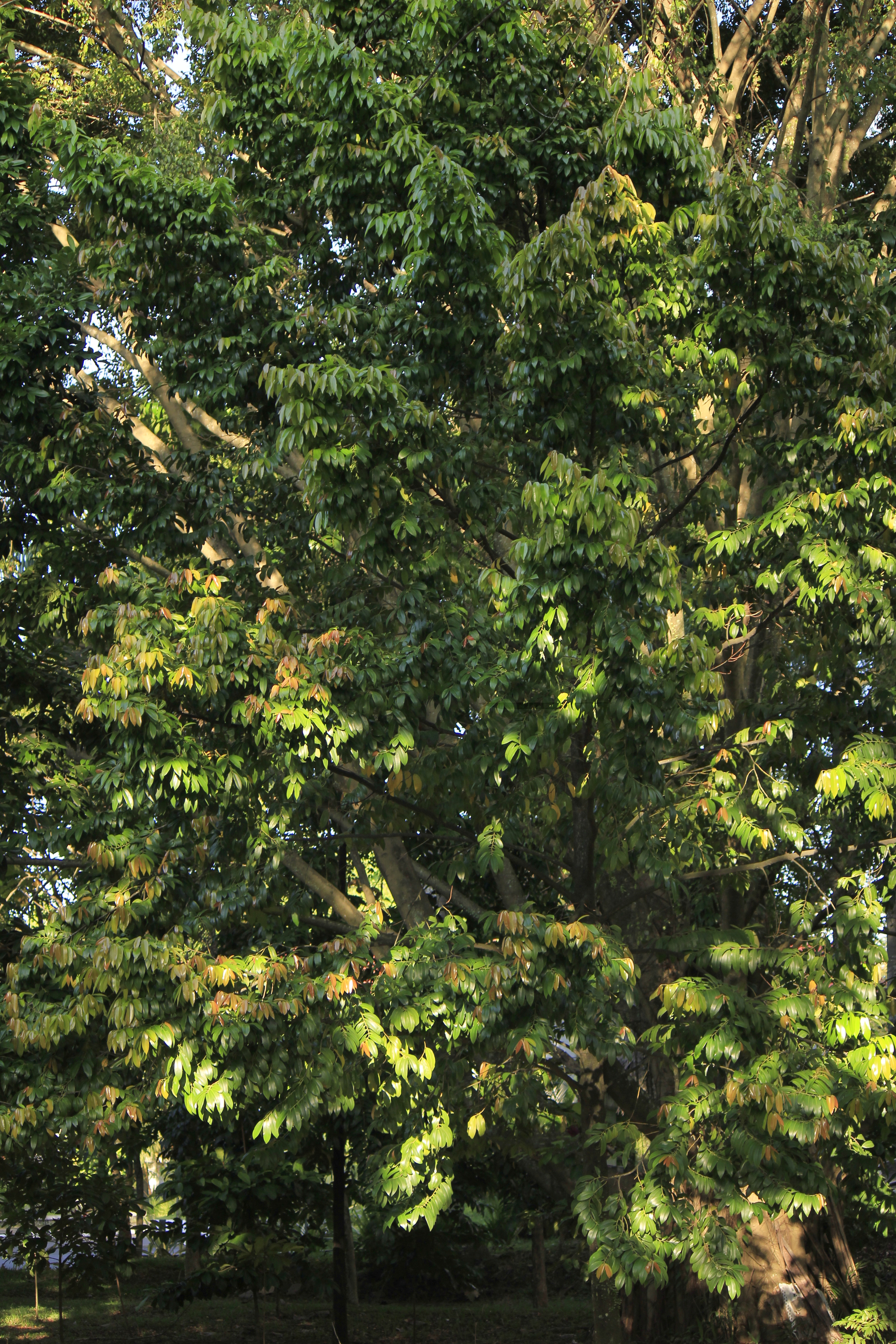

Conservation status
- Vulnerable (IUCN 2.3)

Scientific classification
- Kingdom: Plantae
- Clade: Tracheophytes
- Clade: Angiosperms
- Clade: Eudicots
- Clade: Asterids
- Order: Ericales
- Family: Ebenaceae
- Genus: Diospyros
- Species: D. celebica

Binomial name
- Diospyros celebica Bakh.

= Diospyros celebica =

Species of tree

Diospyros celebica (commonly known as black ebony or Makassar ebony) is a species of flowering tree in the family Ebenaceae that is endemic to the island of Sulawesi in Indonesia. The common name Makassar ebony originates from the main seaport on the island, Makassar.

== Description ==
The tree grows up to 20 m (66 ft) high under favourable circumstances, although such trees are rarely seen nowadays.

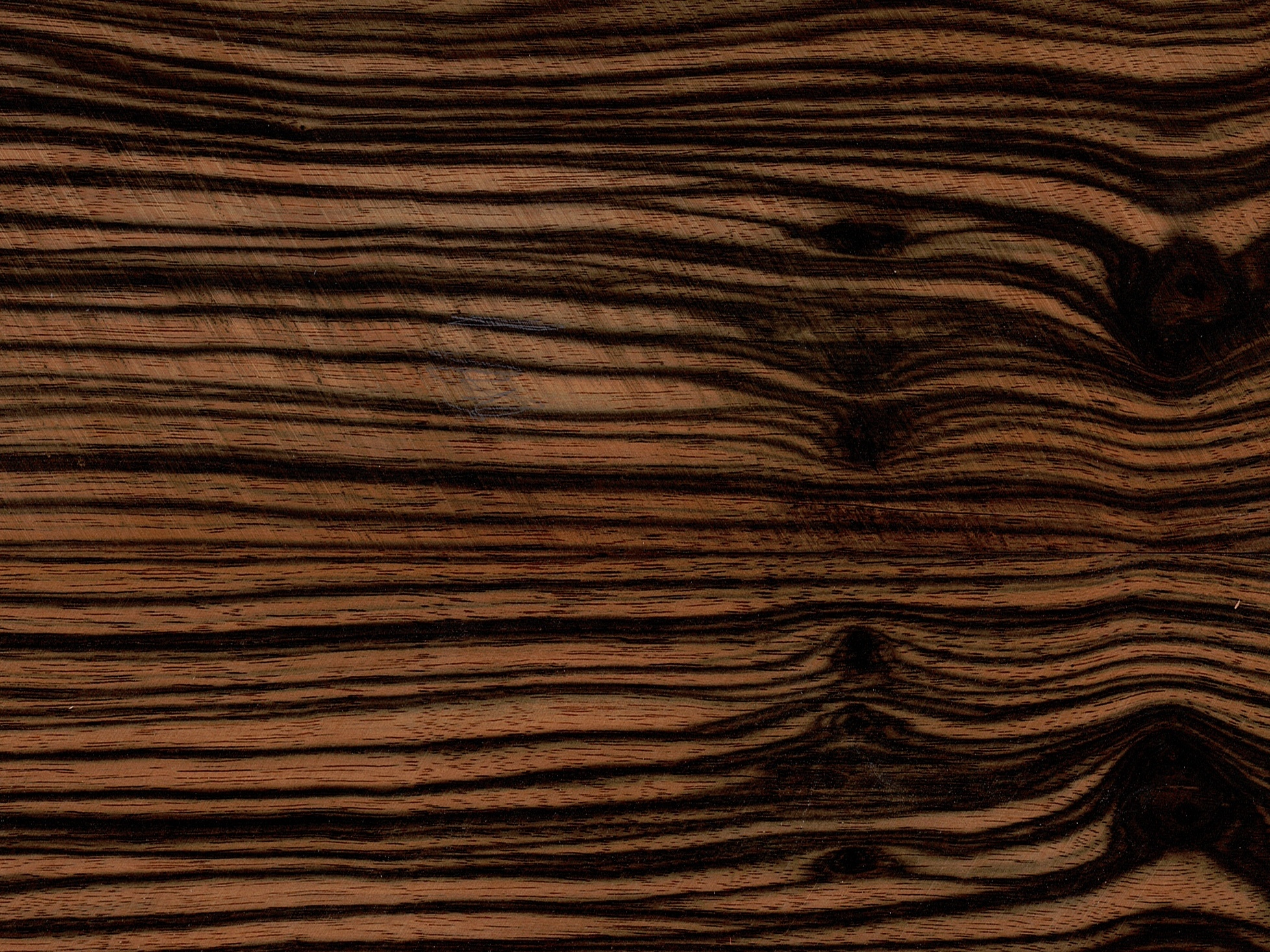
Makassar ebony wood

The heartwood of D. celebica shows a wide striped pattern of dark brown and the typical black of ebony wood. As macassar ebony, it has been traded since the colonial period and is regarded as a valuable wood for a variety of woodworking.

== Distribution ==
D. celebica is endemic to Sulawesi. It has been extensively logged for its wood since colonial times and its current conservation status is considered "vulnerable".

== Uses ==
The wood of D. celebica is the source of the variegated ebony variety macassar ebony. The wood is often defective, showing cracks, and in particular heart shakes and splits. It is not easy to dry and is best given ample time for this. Converting logs into boards as soon as possible is recommended.

It is considered a highly valuable wood for turnery, fine cabinet work, and joinery. It is also used as a wood in fingerboards for guitars and other related instruments. Japan used to be the main importer of this wood and is much sought for posts (床柱 (tokobashira)) in traditional Japanese houses.
