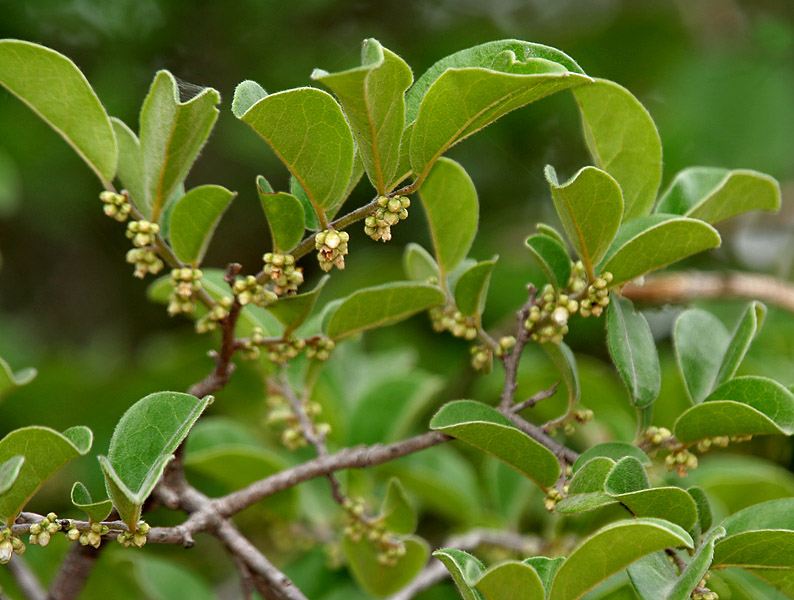

Scientific classification
- Kingdom: Plantae
- Clade: Tracheophytes
- Clade: Angiosperms
- Clade: Eudicots
- Clade: Asterids
- Order: Ericales
- Family: Ebenaceae
- Genus: Diospyros
- Species: D. chloroxylon

Binomial name
- Diospyros chloroxylon Roxb.

Synonyms
- Diospyros capitulata Wight, 1848; Diospyros chloroxylon var. cupulosa V.Singh, 2005; Diospyros insculpta Buch.-Ham., 1827; Diospyros spinosa Hiern, 1873; Diospyros tomentosa Poir., 1804

= Diospyros chloroxylon =

Wild fruit-bearing plant

Diospyros chloroxylon, the green ebony persimmon, is a wild fruit-bearing plant in the family Ebenaceae. It is the indigenous fruit of the Indian subcontinent, and both unripe and ripe fruits are eaten by tribal people.

== Description ==
Green ebony persimmon grows 6-10 meters tall, primarily in deciduous forests. Plants prefer full sun and free draining soil. The species has deciduous, rough bark and thorns on new growth. Leaves are alternate, oval to oval-oblong, pubescent, and persistent.

Flowering occurs from February to June, overlapping with the fruiting season of May to September. Flowers are yellow-cream, dioecious, and cymose.

Fruits are globose berries which are green unripe and red-orange when ripe. Propagation occurs via seed dispersal.
