= Lissocarpa =

Scientific classification
- Kingdom: Plantae
- Clade: Embryophytes
- Clade: Tracheophytes
- Clade: Spermatophytes
- Clade: Angiosperms
- Clade: Eudicots
- Clade: Asterids
- Order: Ericales
- Family: Ebenaceae
- Genus: Lissocarpa; Benth.

Genus of flowering plants

Lissocarpa is a genus of flowering plants, described as a genus in 1876. It is classified as belonging to the family Ebenaceae, the ebony and diospyros family. It includes only a few species of small evergreen trees and shrubs species native to tropical South America.

Lissocarpa species share various characters with other members of Ebenaceae, e.g., the black color of roots and bark, extrafloral nectaries on abaxial leaf surfaces, a persistent calyx, unisexual flowers, biovulate carpels with pendulous ovules, and a similar wood anatomy producing a hard, dark heartwood timber similar to ebony. They are slow-growing trees found on a wide variety of soils and sites. They grow in a large range of conditions. Best growth is in the bottom lands of River Valleys.

species

- Lissocarpa benthamii - Colombia, Venezuela, Guyana, Brazil
- Lissocarpa guianensis - S Venezuela, Guyana
- Lissocarpa jensonii - N Peru
- Lissocarpa kating - N Peru
- Lissocarpa ronliesneri - Zamora-Chinchipe
- Lissocarpa stenocarpa - Colombia, S Venezuela, N Peru
- Lissocarpa tetramera - Puno, Bolivia
- Lissocarpa uyat - N Peru
