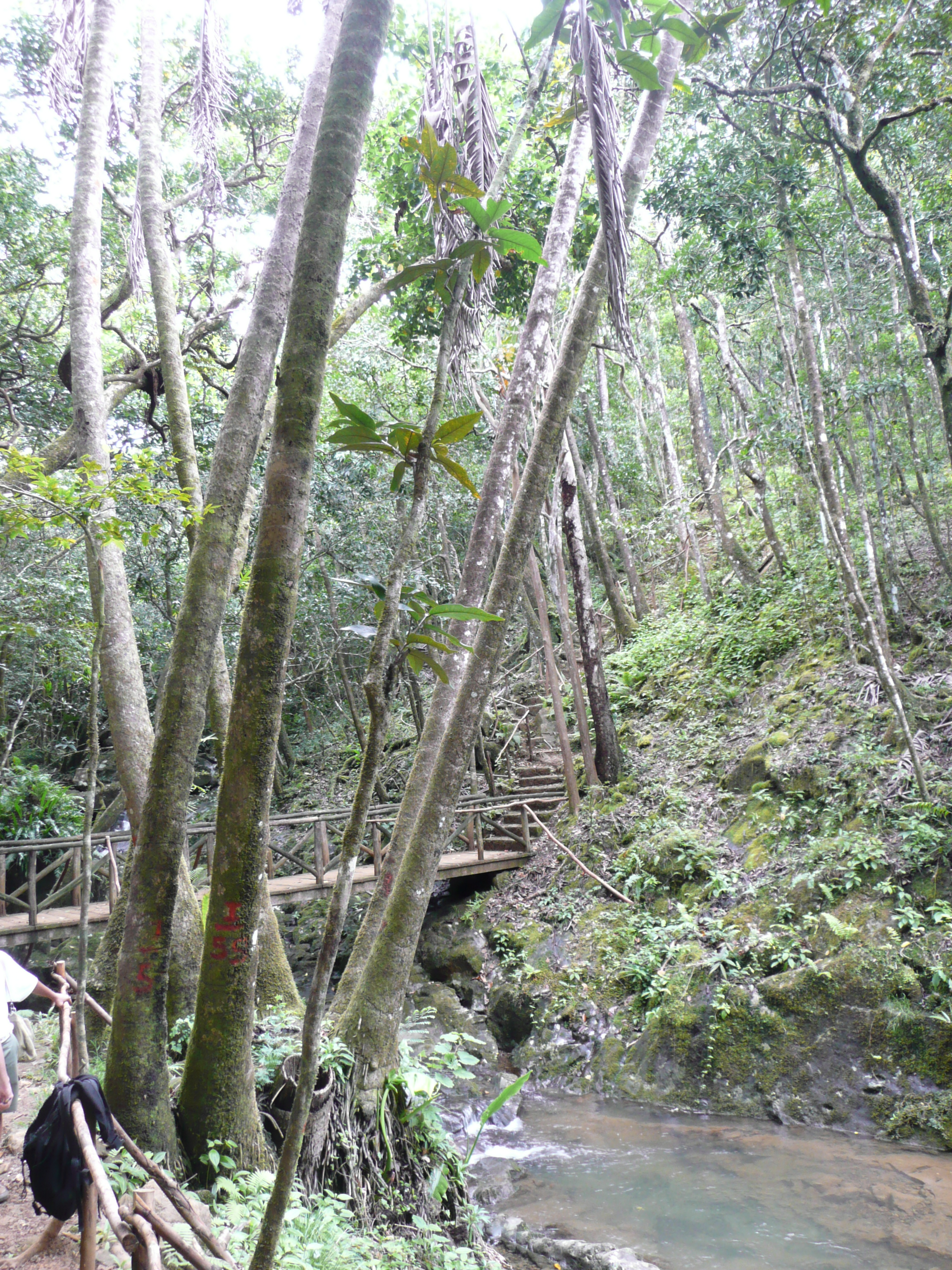
- In Vallée de Ferney in Island of Mauritius

Conservation status
- Critically Endangered (IUCN 2.3)

Scientific classification
- Kingdom: Plantae
- Clade: Tracheophytes
- Clade: Angiosperms
- Clade: Eudicots
- Clade: Rosids
- Order: Myrtales
- Family: Myrtaceae
- Genus: Eugenia
- Species: E. bojeri

Binomial name
- Eugenia bojeri Baker

= Eugenia bojeri =

Species of plant

Eugenia bojeri is a species of plant in the family Myrtaceae. It is endemic to Mauritius.
