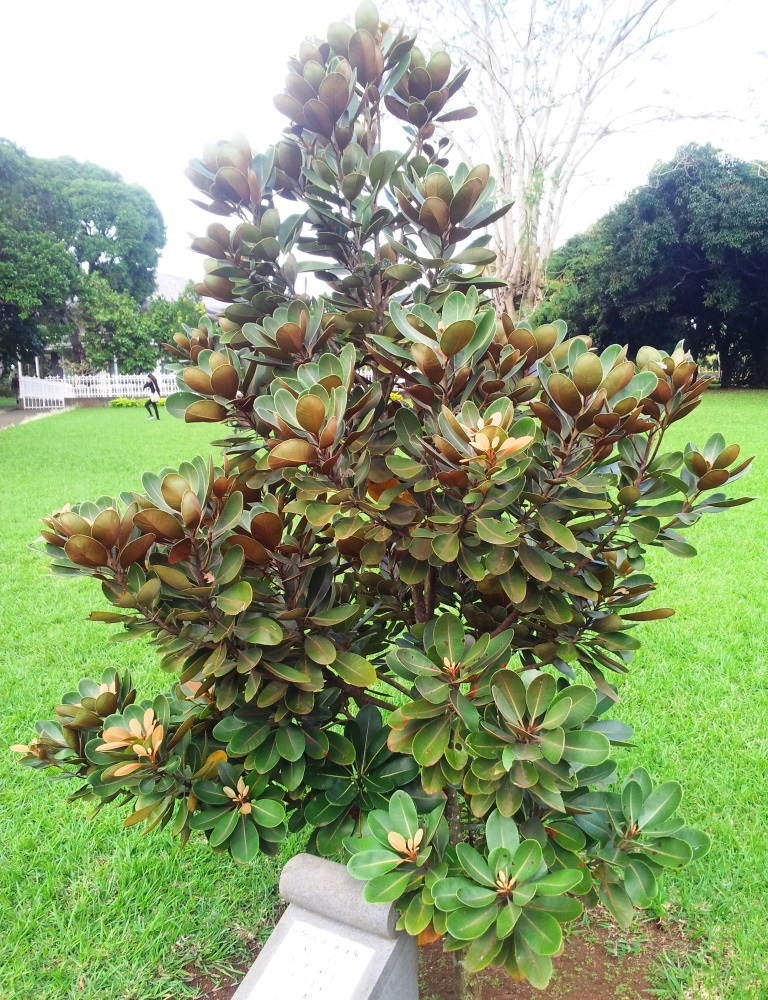
- Juvenile plant in cultivation in Mauritius

Scientific classification
- Kingdom: Plantae
- Clade: Tracheophytes
- Clade: Angiosperms
- Clade: Eudicots
- Clade: Asterids
- Order: Ericales
- Family: Sapotaceae
- Genus: Sideroxylon
- Species: S. puberulum

Binomial name
- Sideroxylon puberulum A.DC.

Synonyms
- Planchonella puberula (A.DC.) H.J.Lam

= Sideroxylon puberulum =

Species of flowering plant

Sideroxylon puberulum, or manglier rouge, is a species of plant in the family Sapotaceae. It is endemic to Mauritius.

== Description ==
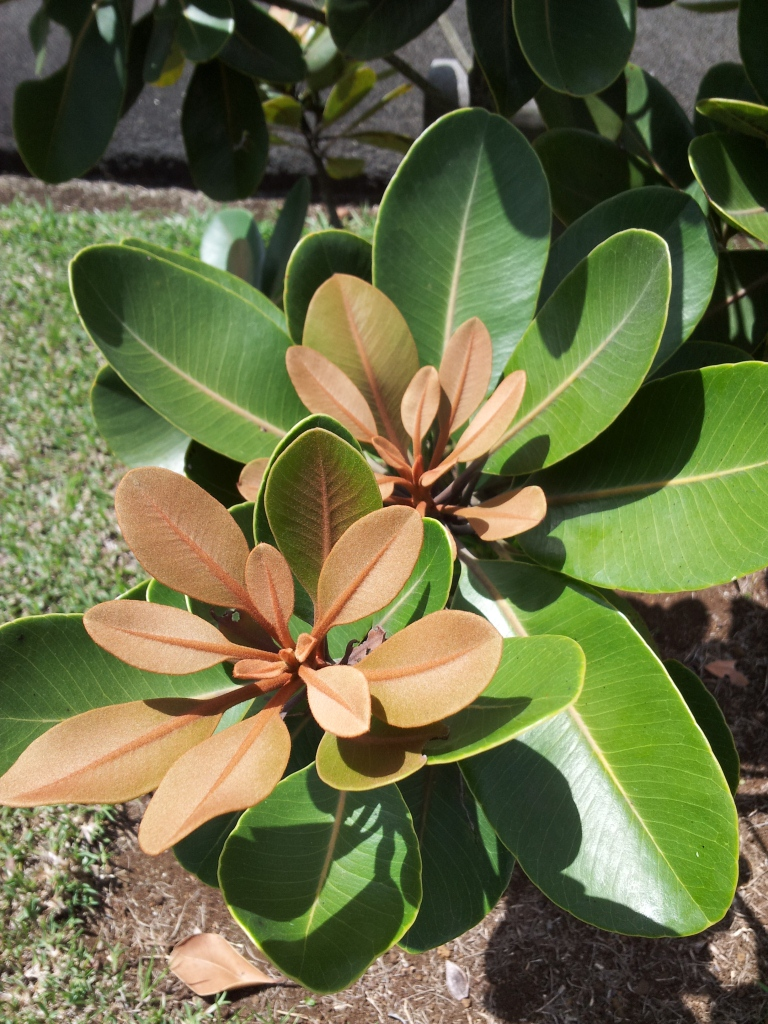
Detail of foliage - showing new and old leaves

It produces dense, elegant whorls of leaves, which are thick, leathery, elliptical and covered in reddish brown fur when young (especially in winter). Even adult leaves can be a furry reddish-brown on the underside. It produces tiny hermaphroditic flowers - packed along its stems - and black berries which exude a white latex. Its wood is unusually strong and heavy.

It reaches a height of 15 meters, with a trunk diameter of 60 cm. It has grey bark. It acquired its nickname "Manglier" ("mangrove") because in older trees the inside of the trunk often decays, leaving the tree standing on multiple remains of the trunk, which look like the stilt-roots of mangrove trees. However it is relatively unrelated to the mangrove tree.

=== Relatives and distinguishing features ===
It shares its habitat with its sister-species, Sideroxylon cinereum ("Manglier vert"), a similar tree that can be distinguished by its more slender, divided trunks, and by the fact that its young leaves are hairless.

It can also be confused with the trees of the endemic Labourdonnaisia ("Bois de Natte") genus - which occur in the same habitat. However the Labourdonnaisia trees have parallel venation on their leaves - while the Sideroxylon trees have densely-netted venation and a strong midrib under their leaves.

== Distribution ==
The tree was formerly abundant throughout Mauritius, but was widely exterminated due to demand for its wood, and it is now a protected species (listed as Vulnerable). It survives predominantly in the highlands, in intermediate and upland forest.

It is also beginning to be propagated in its native country of Mauritius, as an ornamental landscape tree for gardens and public spaces.
