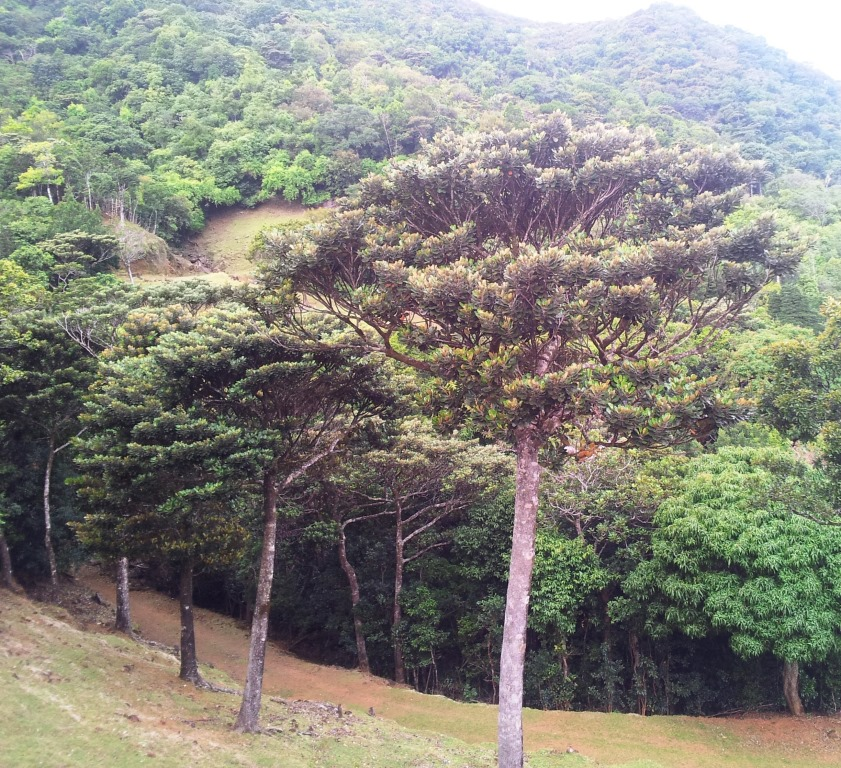
- Labourdonnaisia glauca at Vallée de Ferney, Mauritius

Scientific classification
- Kingdom: Plantae
- Clade: Tracheophytes
- Clade: Angiosperms
- Clade: Eudicots
- Clade: Asterids
- Order: Ericales
- Family: Sapotaceae
- Subfamily: Sapotoideae
- Genus: Labourdonnaisia; Bojer

Synonyms
- Faucherea Lecomte; Labourdonneia Bojer

= Labourdonnaisia =

Genus of plant in the family Sapotaceae

Labourdonnaisia is a genus of plants in the family Sapotaceae, which was described as a genus in 1841. It is native to the islands of Madagascar, Mauritius, and Réunion in the western Indian Ocean.

The genus is named for Bertrand-François Mahé de La Bourdonnais (1699 – 1753), French governor of Mauritius 1735–1740.

The Labourdonnaisia tree species can also sometimes be confused with the Mascarene trees of the genus Sideroxylon. However the Labourdonnaisia species have parallel venation on their leaves, while the Sideroxylon species have densely netted leaf-venation and strong midribs under their leaves.

== species ==
18 species are accepted.

1. Labourdonnaisia ambrensis (Aubrév.) L.Gaut. & Randriarisoa – central and eastern Madagascar
2. Labourdonnaisia calophylloides Bojer – Mauritius and Réunion
3. Labourdonnaisia glauca Bojer – Mauritius
4. Labourdonnaisia glutinosa (Aubrév.) L.Gaut. & Randriarisoa – eastern Madagascar
5. Labourdonnaisia hexandra Lecomte – eastern Madagascar
6. Labourdonnaisia laciniata (Lecomte) L.Gaut. & Randriarisoa – eastern Madagascar
7. Labourdonnaisia lecomtei Aubrév. – Madagascar
8. Labourdonnaisia longepedicellata (Aubrév.) L.Gaut. & Randriarisoa – eastern Madagascar
9. Labourdonnaisia madagascariensis Pierre ex Baill. – Madagascar
10. Labourdonnaisia manongarivensis (Aubrév.) L.Gaut. & Randriarisoa – eastern Madagascar
11. Labourdonnaisia parvifolia (Lecomte) L.Gaut. & Randriarisoa – eastern Madagascar
12. Labourdonnaisia revoluta Bojer – Mauritius
13. Labourdonnaisia richardiana Pierre ex Aubrév. – Madagascar
14. Labourdonnaisia sambiranensis (Aubrév.) L.Gaut. & Randriarisoa – northern and northeastern Madagascar
15. Labourdonnaisia tampoloensis (Aubrév.) L.Gaut. & Randriarisoa – eastern Madagascar
16. Labourdonnaisia thouarsii Pierre ex Dubard – Madagascar
17. Labourdonnaisia thouvenotii (Lecomte) L.Gaut. & Randriarisoa – central and eastern Madagascar
18. Labourdonnaisia urschii (Aubrév.) L.Gaut. & Randriarisoa – eastern Madagascar
