= Vallée de Ferney =

Nature reserve in Mauritius

Coordinates: 20.3623°S 57.7059°E

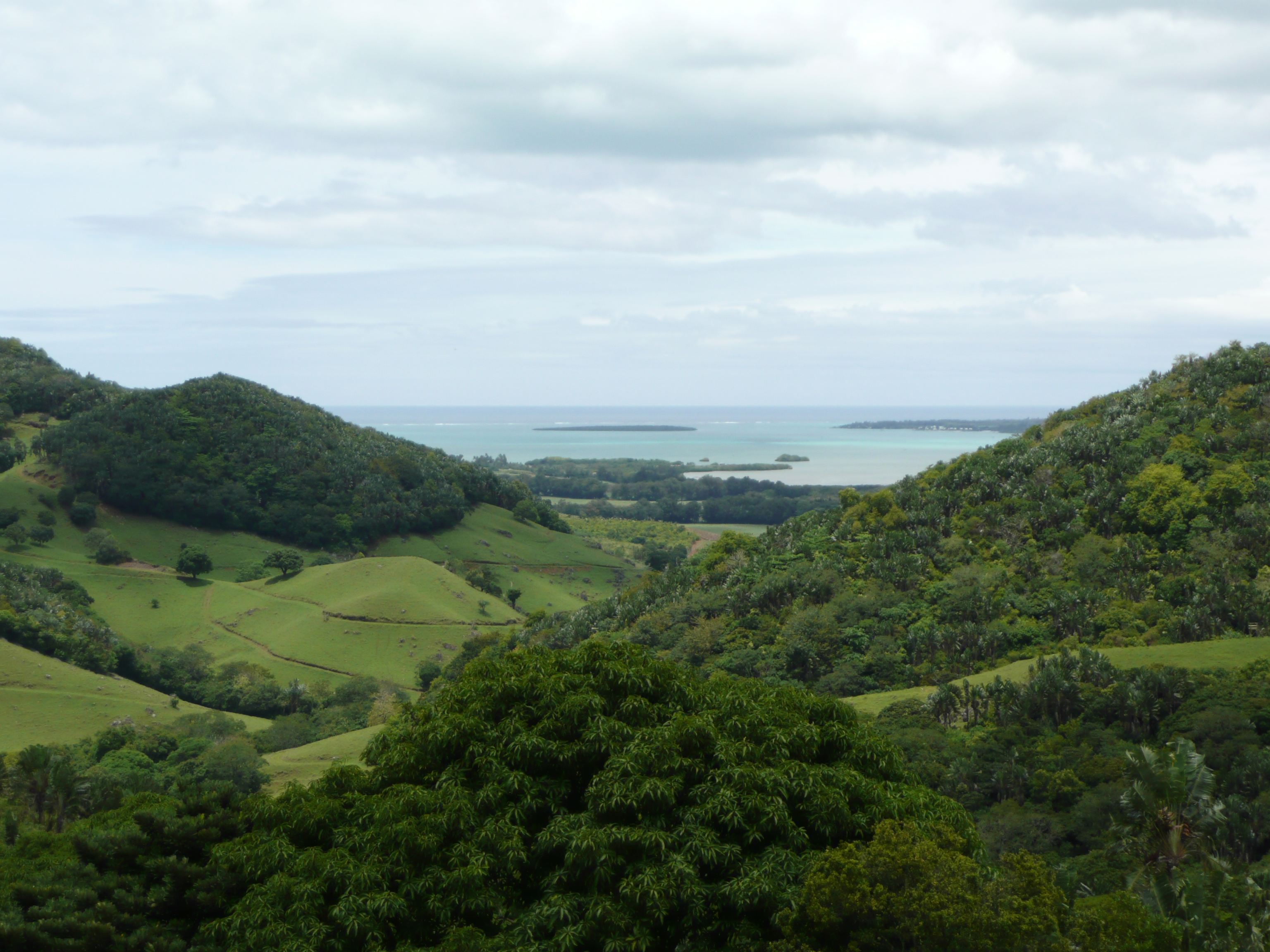
Valley view, with Ile aux Aigrettes in the distance

La Vallée de Ferney is a forest and wildlife reserve situated in the Bambou mountains north of Mahébourg in Grand Port District, Mauritius. It is managed by the La Vallée de Ferney Conservation Trust.

== History and location ==
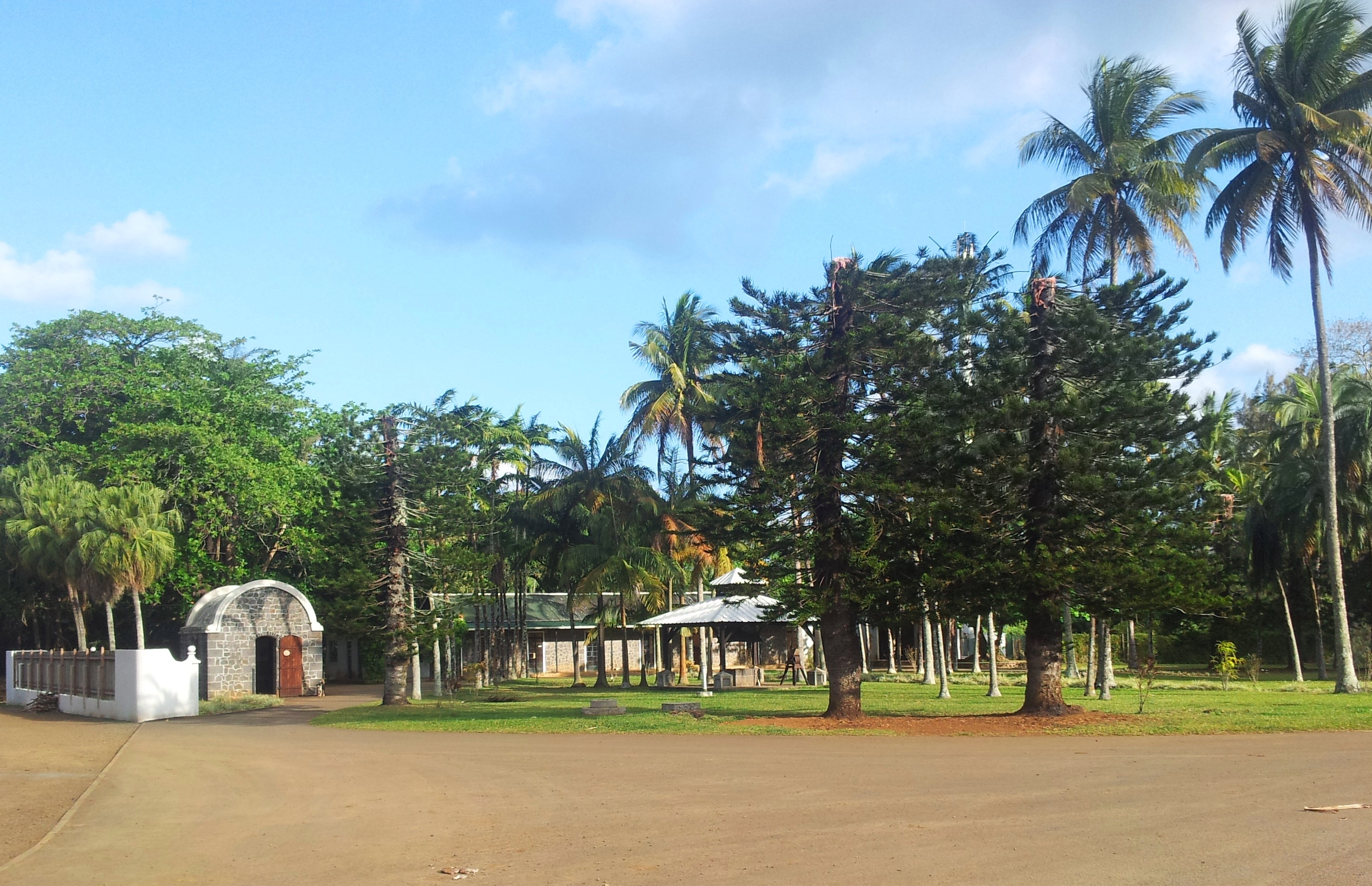
Old farm buildings near the entrance

The 200 hectare natural area was established at the end of 2006, as a conservation trust - with the land-owners in partnership with the Mauritian Wildlife Foundation (MWF) and local authorities. It was launched as a program for conservation and restoration of the indigenous forests of the valley.

Awareness of the valley's biodiversity was raised in 2004 when a highway that was due to be constructed through the area threatened the local plants and animals with the necessary clearing of forest for the roads and tunnels. Surveys in the valley by the Environment Monitoring Committee led to the discovery of several species that were new to science, or were thought to have been extinct. It also predicted that a great many more new species would likely be discovered in the area. After local action and petitions, the highway development was successfully diverted.

Ferney La Vallée is located north of the town of Mahébourg in Grand Port District, Mauritius. Its entrance is off the B 28 road, just north of Ferney Falaise Rouge, not far from the Vallée de l'Est conservation area. The valley's land-form is largely composed of Tertiary volcanic series with a range of acidic and clay soils. It is wind-facing and its climate is humid throughout the year.

== Facilities ==
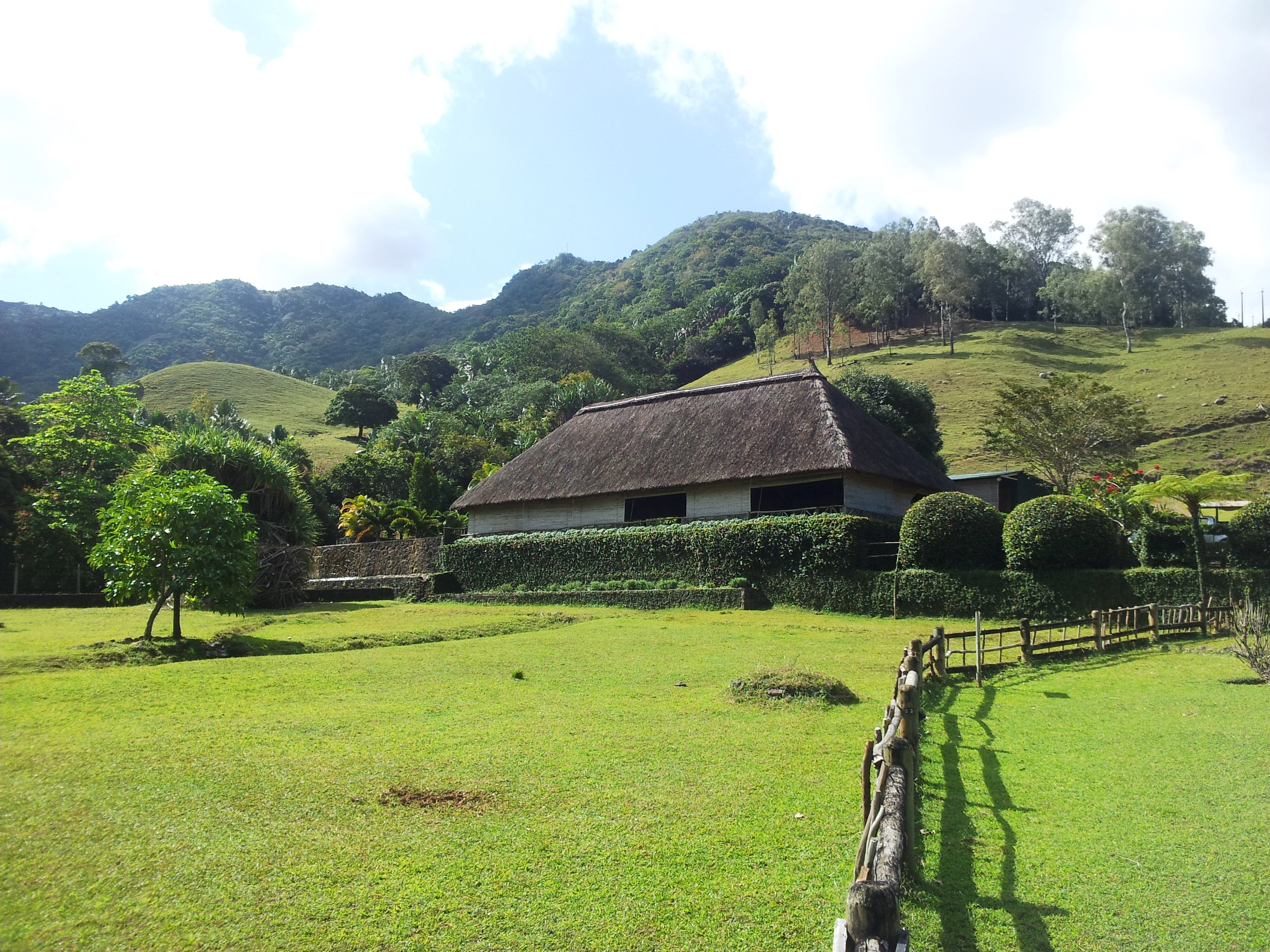
Visitors complex

As one of the last nature refuges on the island, Ferney La Vallée was opened to provide the public with an experience of the indigenous biodiversity of Mauritius. Hiking circuits run through the indigenous forests of the valley, past look-out points, and guided tours are regularly conducted.

At the reserve's entrance at the bottom of the valley, a tiny stone museum displays the history of the area, with a nearby set of gardens of edible and useful plants. Higher up in the valley, the restaurant and visitors complex has been created from an old hunting lodge. Ferney Nature Lodge is a lodge where people can stay at. Nearby are the giant tortoises, and a nursery that makes endemic and endangered plants available for sale to local Mauritian visitors. A daily feeding of the endangered kestrels is also conducted for visitors at this point.

== Biodiversity ==
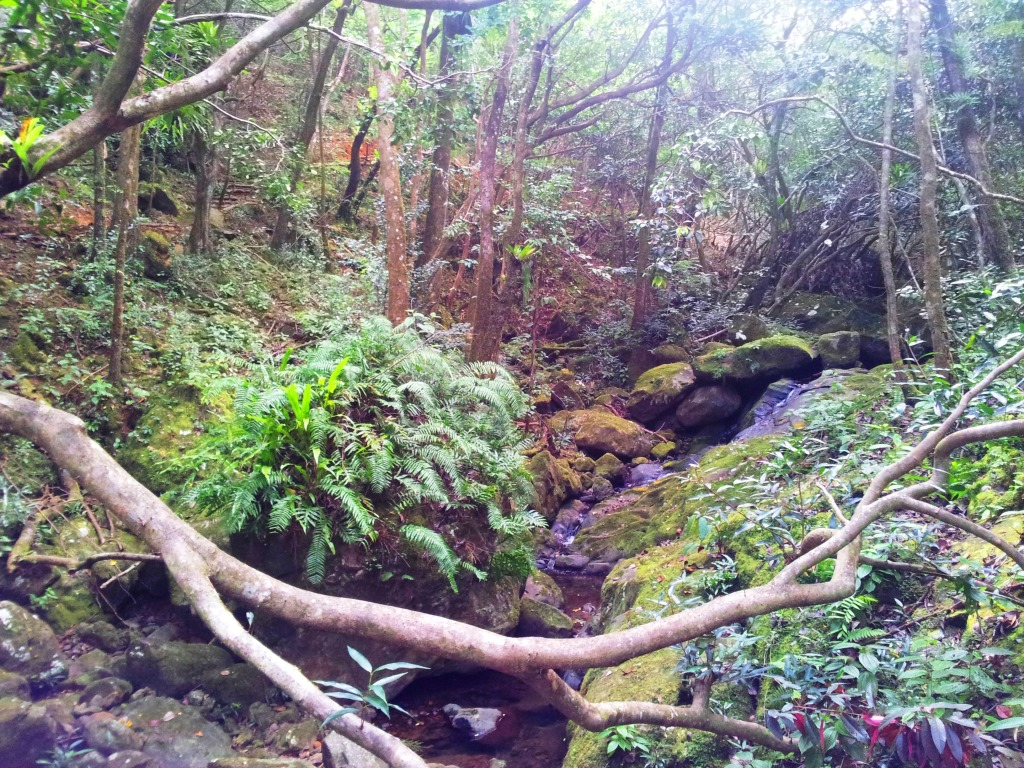
Indigenous rainforest

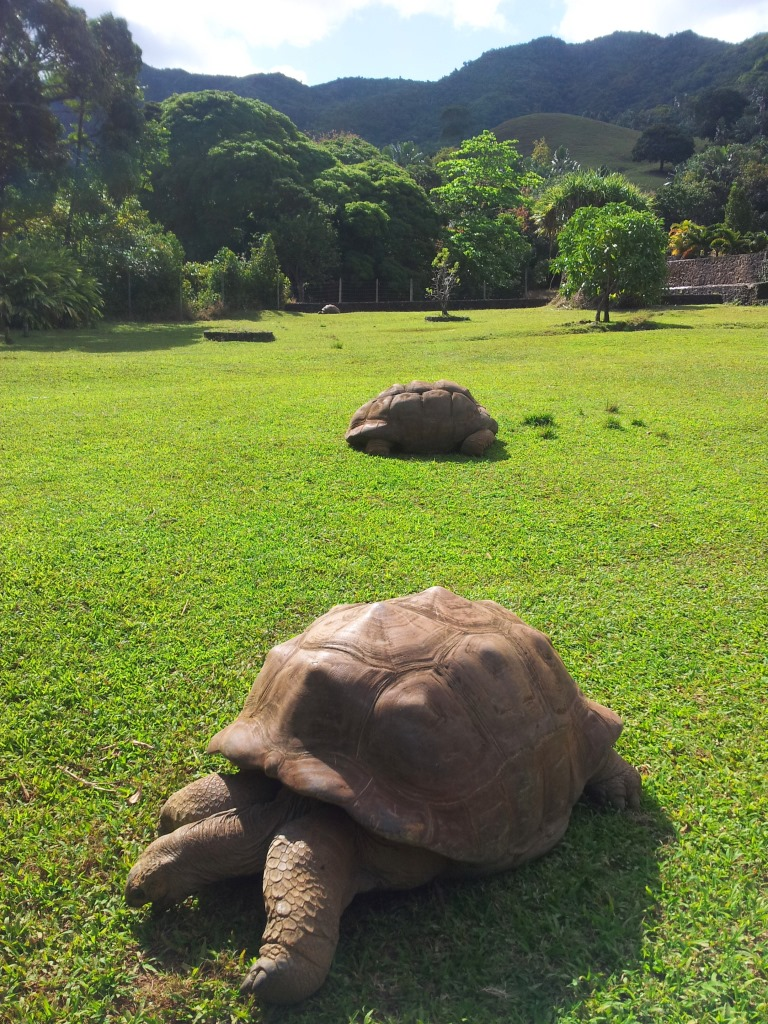
Giant tortoises at Ferney

Ferney La Vallée is mostly composed of partially rehabilitated rainforests, with a large number of plant species, most of which are endangered or vulnerable. The valley was where several species were rediscovered after being thought extinct, such as Pandanus iceryi and Pandanus macrostigma. Eugenia bojeri is another critically endangered species that was discovered for the first time in Ferney.

Several exotic species include the Javan rusa (Rusa timorensis) and the Wild boar (Sus scofra).

In addition, several threatened animal species are protected in the reserve. These include the endangered Mauritius kestrel (Falco punctatus) and the Mauritian flying fox (Pteropus niger), a megabat.

Less than 2% of the indigenous ecosystems of Mauritius remain intact and Ferney La Vallée is one of the last nature preserves on the island.

Future projects in the valley will include the large-scale propagation and introduction of indigenous and endemic plants to degraded parts of the valley, together with continued weeding of invasive alien plants. There will also be a re-introduction of the endangered endemic birds pink pigeon (Columba mayeri) and echo parakeet (Psittacula echo). The giant tortoises, whose grazing action naturally assists in the regeneration of Mauritian forests, will also be released into the core conservation zone, to complete the re-establishment of the ecological balance of the forests.

A nearby conservation area, Vallée de l'Est, is providing further protection for the area, in conserving and restoring an additional 70 hectares of rare highland forest.
