= Monvert Nature Park =

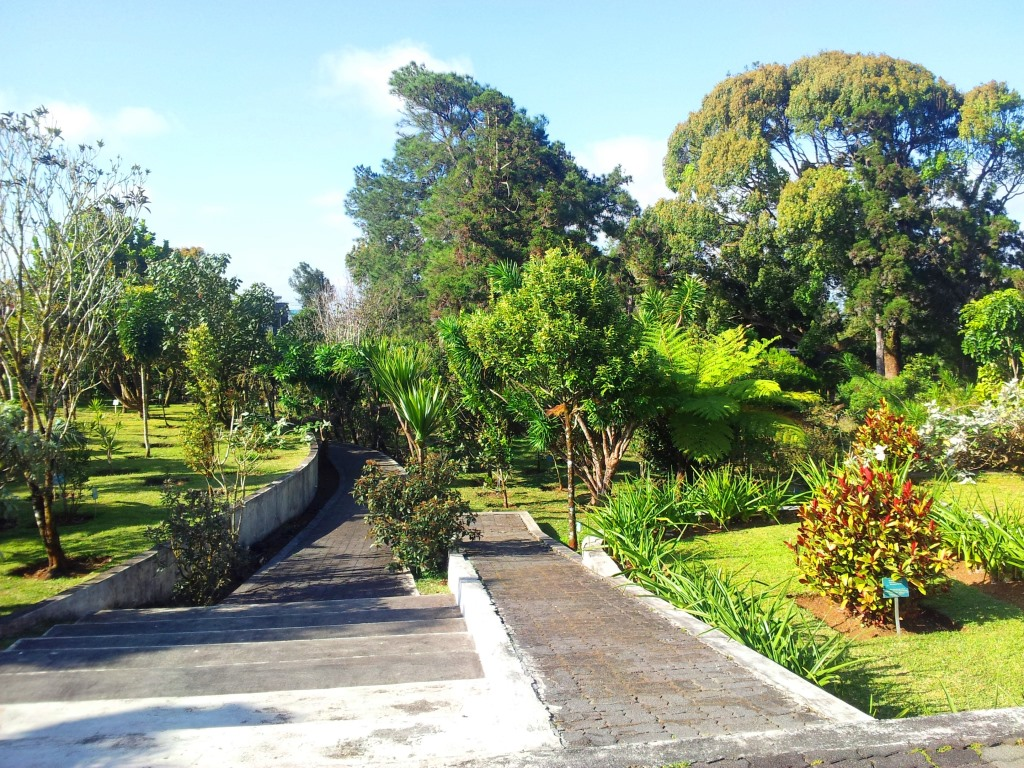
Entrance to the arboretum of Monvert Nature Park by the visitors centre

Monvert Nature Park is a nature walk, arboretum, botanical gardens and rehabilitated indigenous forest, situated in Forest Side, Curepipe, Mauritius.

== History ==
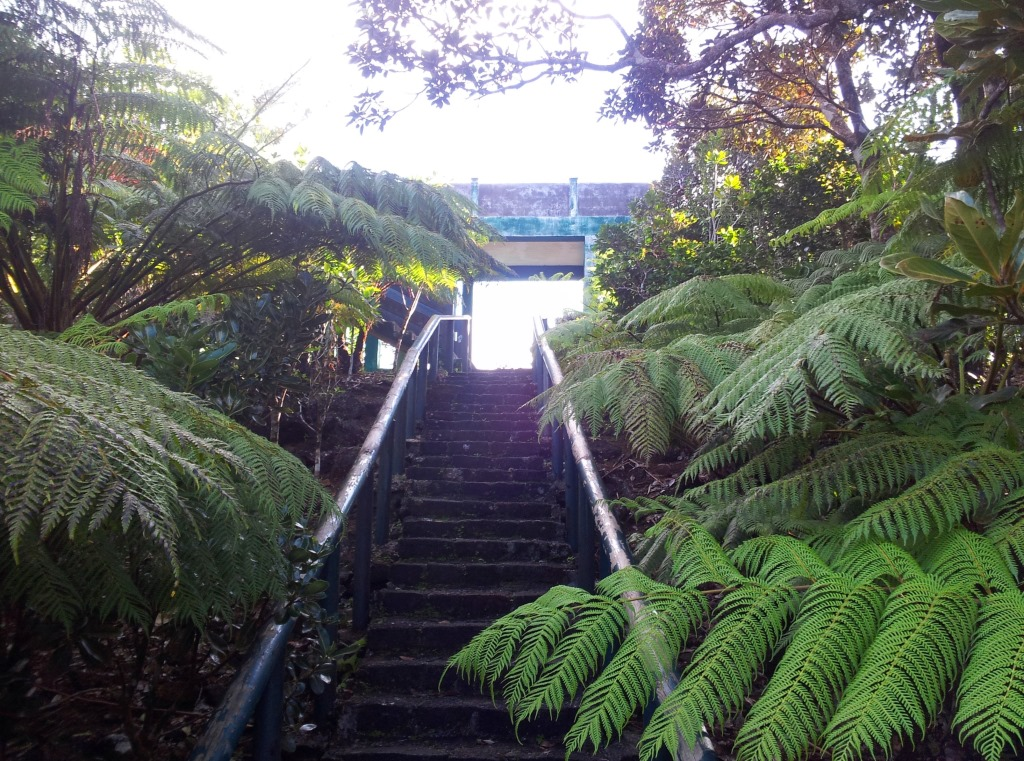
Old Monvert look-out tower

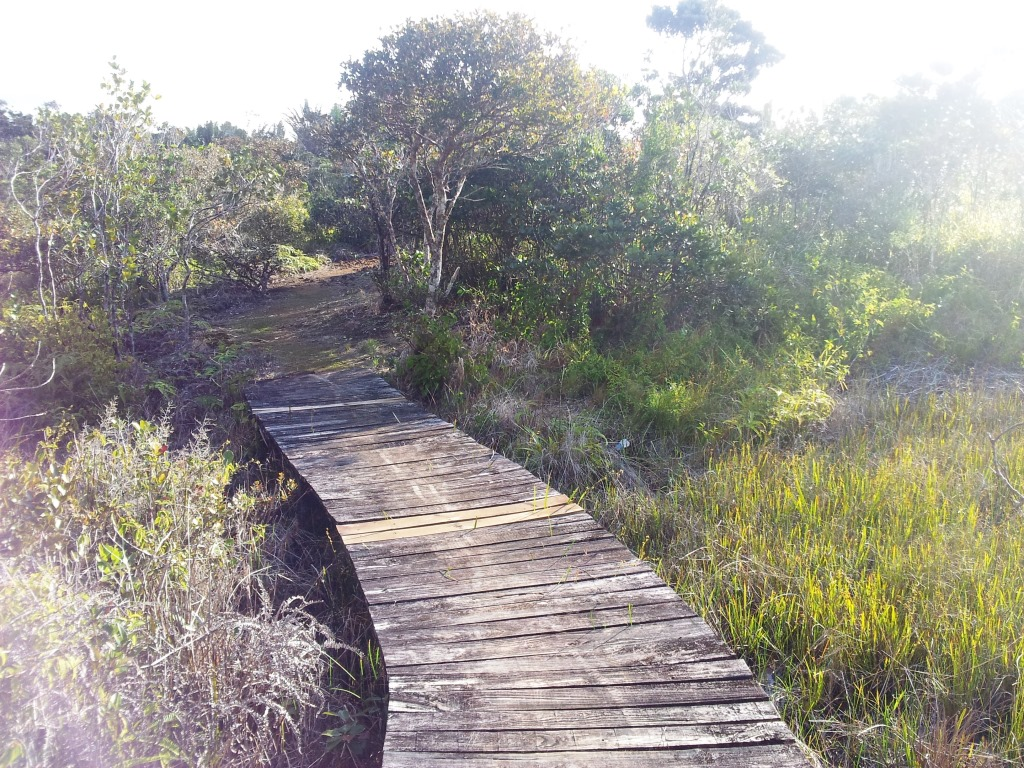
Wetlands

The area of Monvert was named after Chevallier Antoine de Monvert, and was previously a dense indigenous forest (with "Bois de Natte", "Bois Manioc" and "Manglier vert" being the most commons tree species). The entire region was taken for logging in the early 1900s, but while much of the surrounding land was re-planted with fast-growing invasive trees such as eucalyptus from Australia, a portion was left, that naturally re-grew some indigenous Mauritian plants.

This area was set aside for conservation because of the unusually high biodiversity involving critically endangered species, and the nature park was set up between 2001 and 2006. As state land it is managed by the Mauritian National Forestry Service.

== Location ==
The nature park entrance is located just off the A10 road, in the region of Forest Side, about 3 kilometres south-east of the Curepipe Town Centre.

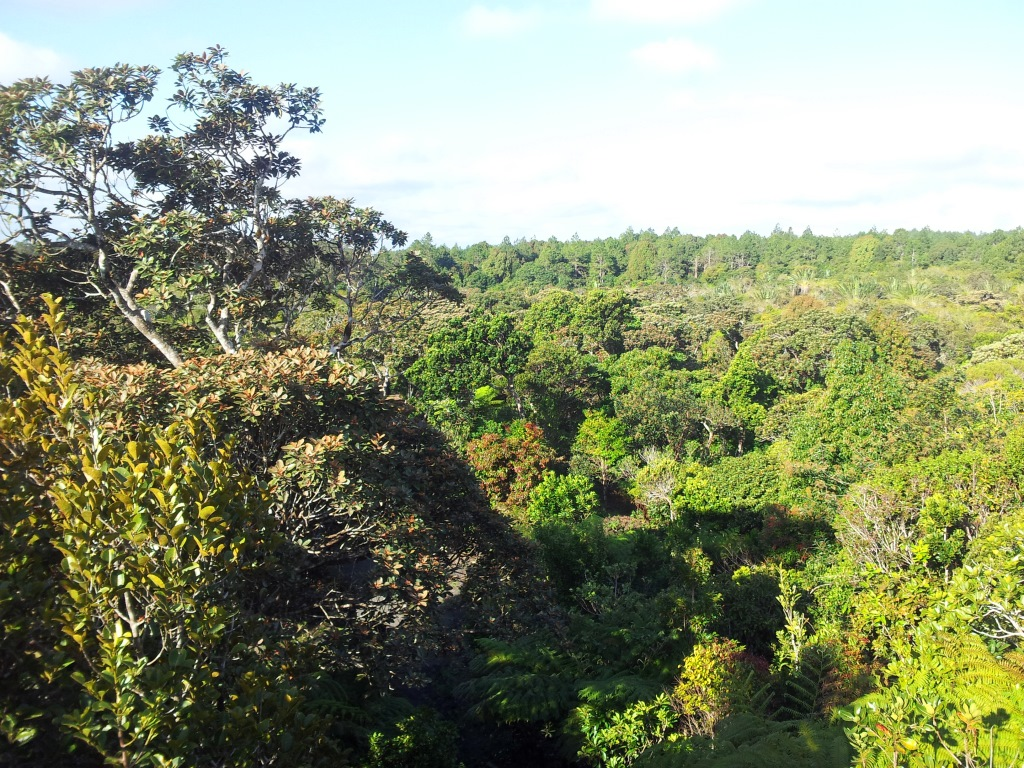
View over the indigenous forest canopy from lookout point

It is the most easily accessed of any indigenous Mauritian forest, being closest to any central urban area. Most of the other remnants of the island's native ecosystems are located either on off-shore islands, or high in Black River Gorges National Park.

== Sections ==
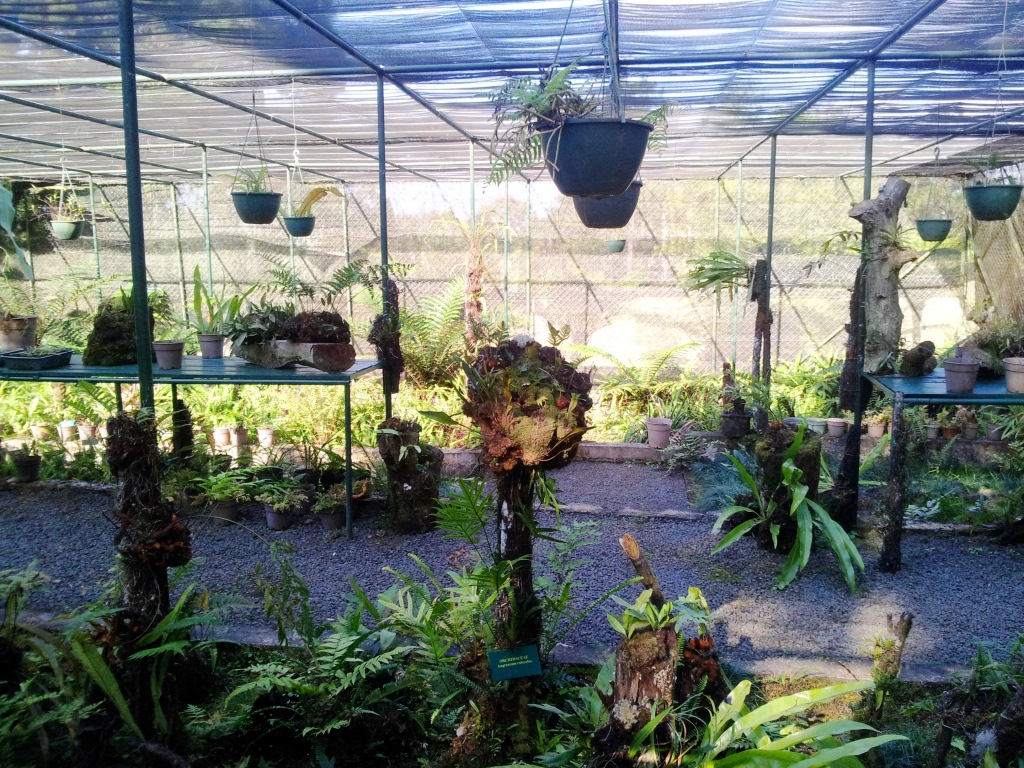
Section of the Fernery

The nature park has two main sections, the smaller visitors interpretation centre, and the nature walk over the larger natural area.

=== Visitors Interpretation Centre ===
The Visitors Centre, just off the A10, contains a display of the biodiversity, forests and invasive species of the country, as a basic overview.

Behind the centre is the arboretum, where over 150 labelled endemic and indigenous species are grown on grassy slopes intersected with paths. Many are critically endangered or extinct in the wild.

At the bottom of the arboretum is the fernery, where many of the island's critically endangered endemic ferns and orchids are displayed. A raised kiosk also serves as a venue for activities.

=== Nature Walk ===
The main natural area is located several kilometres further down the road, past the visitors centre. Here, several looped trails go through kilometres of gradually recovering indigenous forest, and past a large elevated platform at the park's highest point, from which the surrounding region can be viewed.
