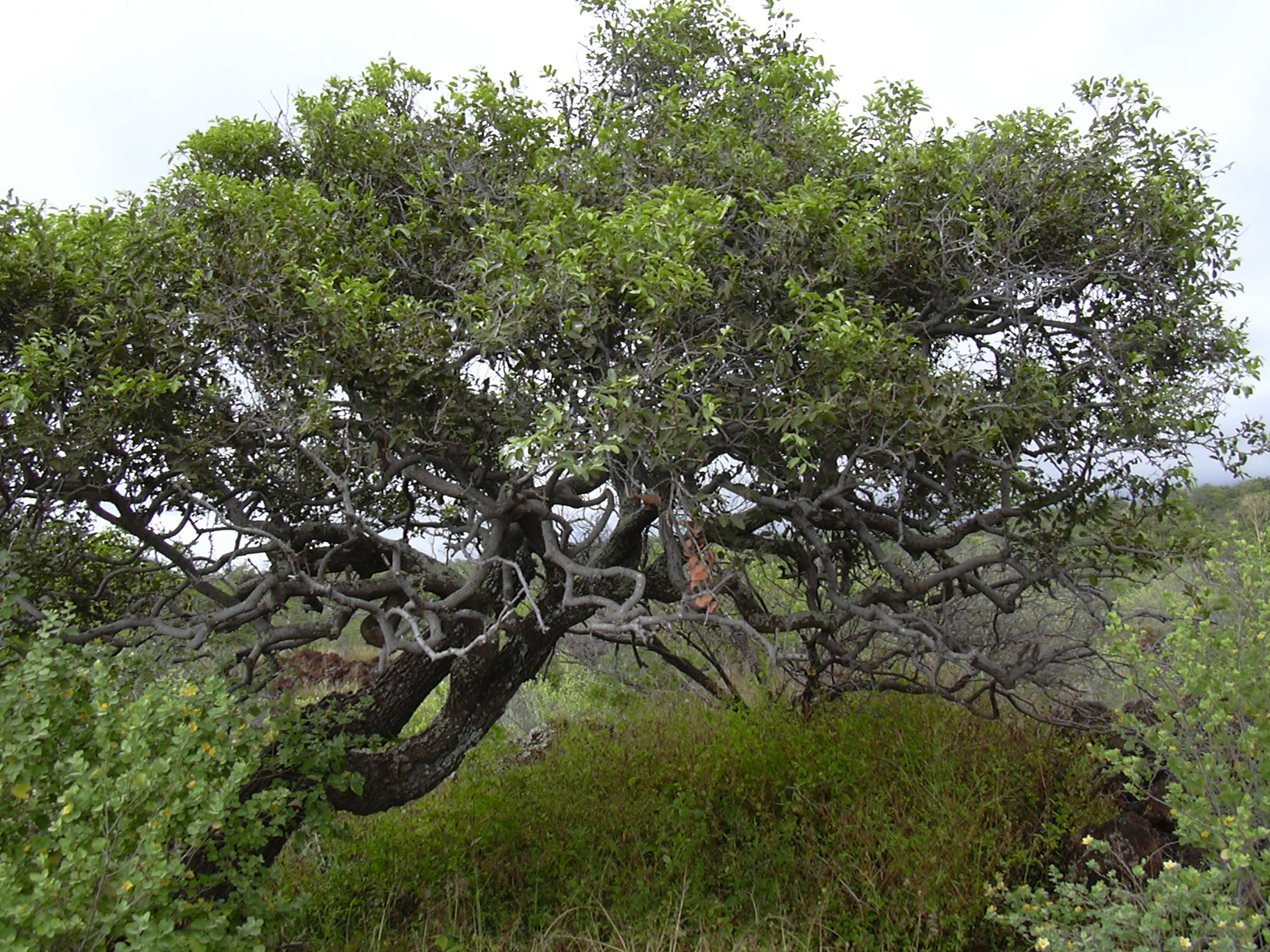
- Diospyros sandwicensis

Scientific classification
- Kingdom: Plantae
- Clade: Embryophytes
- Clade: Tracheophytes
- Clade: Spermatophytes
- Clade: Angiosperms
- Clade: Eudicots
- Clade: Asterids
- Order: Ericales
- Family: Ebenaceae; Gürke

Genera
- See text

= Ebenaceae =

Family of flowering plants

The Ebenaceae are a family of flowering plants belonging to order Ericales. The family includes ebony and persimmon among about 768 species of trees and shrubs. It is distributed across the tropical and warmer temperate regions of the world. It is most diverse in the rainforests of Malesia, India, Thailand, tropical Africa and tropical America.

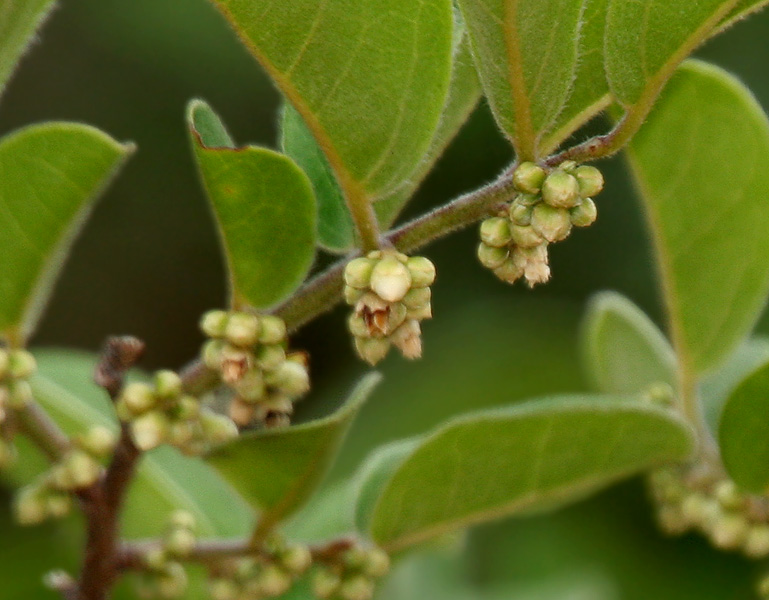
Diospyros chloroxylon

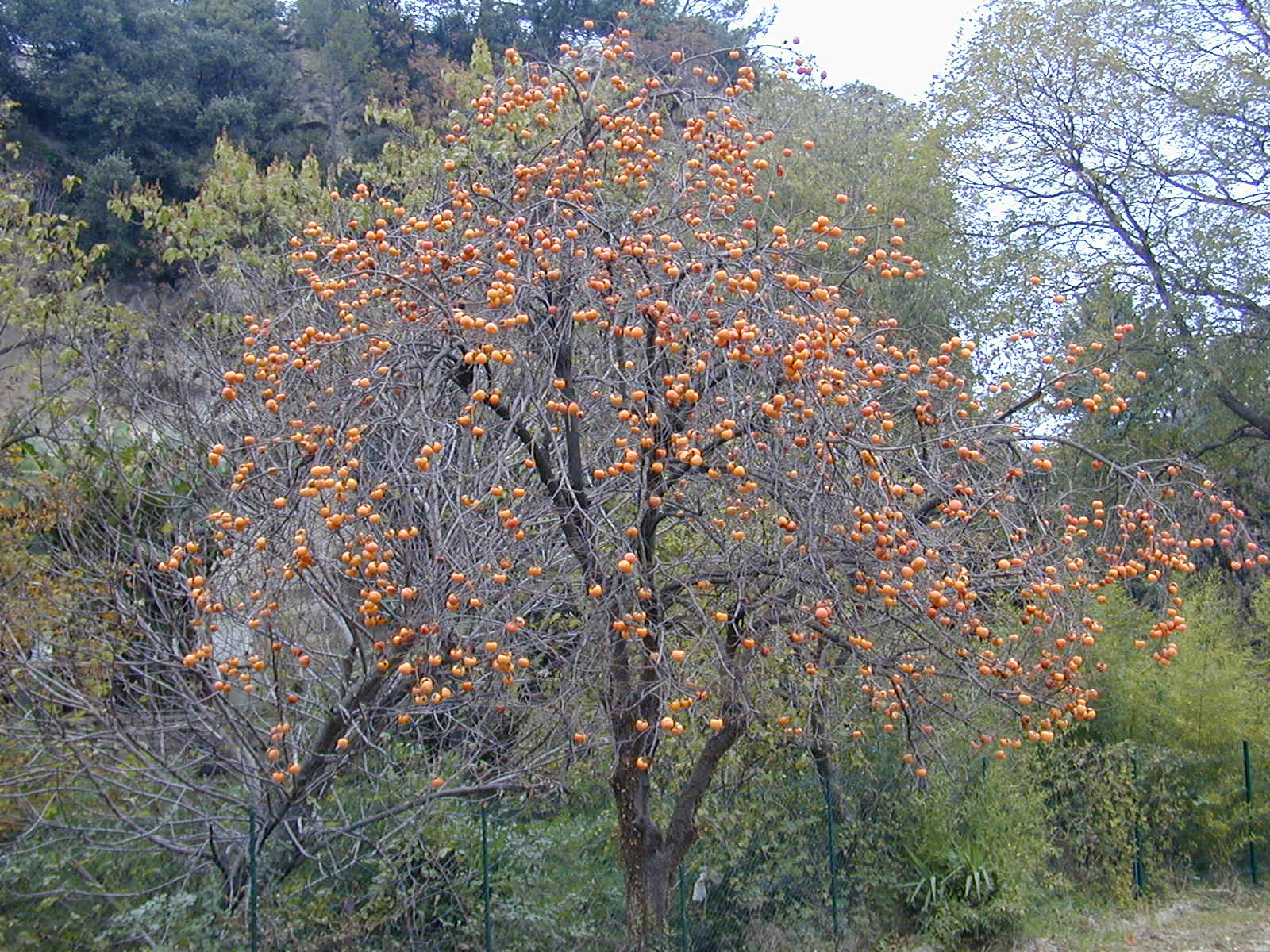
Diospyros kaki

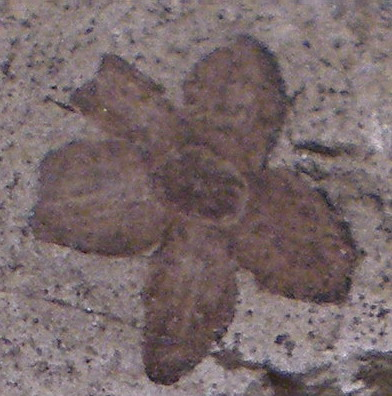
Royena graeca, fossil flower

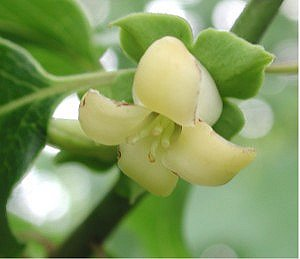
Diospyros virginiana

Many species are valued for their wood, particularly ebony, for fruit, and as ornamental plants.

== Biology ==
The fruits contain tannins, a plant defense against herbivory, so they are often avoided by animals when unripe. The ripe fruits of many species are a food source for diverse animal taxa. The foliage is consumed by insects.

The plants may have a strong scent. Some species have aromatic wood. They are important and conspicuous trees in many of their native ecosystems, such as lowland dry forests of the former Maui Nui in Hawaii, Caspian Hyrcanian mixed forests, Khathiar–Gir dry deciduous forests, Louisiade Archipelago rain forests, Madagascar lowland forests, Narmada Valley dry deciduous forests, New Guinea mangroves, and South Western Ghats montane rain forests.

Ebony is a dense black wood taken from several species in the genus Diospyros, including Diospyros ebenum (Ceylon ebony, Indian ebony), Diospyros crassiflora (West African ebony, Benin ebony), and Diospyros celebica (Makassar ebony). Diospyros tesselaria (Mauritius ebony) was heavily exploited by the Dutch in the 17th century.

== Description ==
The family includes trees and shrubs. The leaves are usually alternately arranged, but some species have opposite or whorled leaves. The inflorescence is usually a cyme of flowers, sometimes a raceme or a panicle, and some plants produce solitary flowers. Most species are dioecious. The flower has 3 to 8 petals, which are joined at the bases. There are usually several single or paired stamens, which are often attached to the inner wall of the corolla. Female flowers have up to 8 stigmas. The calyx is persistent. The fruits are berry-like or capsular. Like the wood of some species, the roots and bark may be black in color.

== Etymology ==
The family name Ebenaceae is based on the genus name Ebenus, published by Otto Kuntze in 1891. It is a later homonym of Ebenus L., a genus already named in the family Fabaceae, and is thus nomen illegitimum. The plant that Kuntze had named Ebenus was accordingly reassigned to the genus Maba, which in turn has since been included in the genus Diospyros.

Because the name Ebenaceae had become well known, having been used in major botanical references such as Bentham and Hooker's Genera Plantarum, Engler and Prantl's Natürlichen Pflanzenfamilien, and Hutchinson's Families of Flowering Plants, it was conserved and is therefore legitimate.

== Genera ==
During the last century, seven genera have been included in the family at one time or another. One phylogenetic analysis reduced the family to four genera:

| Genus | Authority | Citation | Date |
|---|---|---|---|
| Diospyros | L. | Sp. Pl. 2: 1057–1058 | 1753 |
| Euclea | L. | Syst. Veg. (ed. 13) 747 | 1774 |
| Lissocarpa | Benth. | Gen. Pl. 2(2): 667, 671 | 1876 |
| Royena | L. | Sp. Pl. 1: 397 | 1753 |
