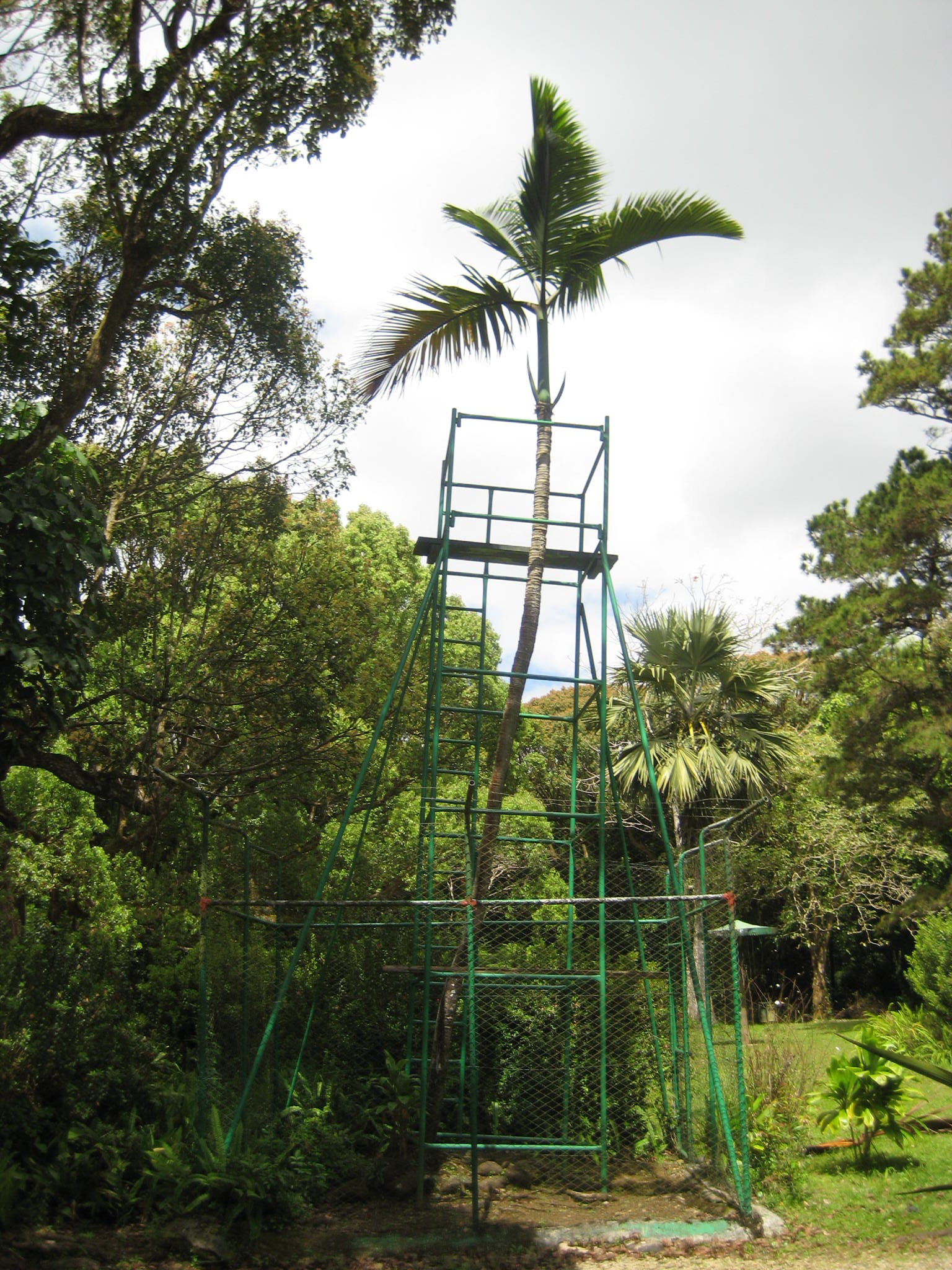

Conservation status
- Critically Endangered (IUCN 2.3)

Scientific classification
- Kingdom: Plantae
- Clade: Tracheophytes
- Clade: Angiosperms
- Clade: Monocots
- Clade: Commelinids
- Order: Arecales
- Family: Arecaceae
- Genus: Hyophorbe
- Species: H. amaricaulis

Binomial name
- Hyophorbe amaricaulis Mart.

Synonyms
- Mascarena revaughanii L. H. Bailey

= Hyophorbe amaricaulis =

Species of palm

Hyophorbe amaricaulis (also known as the "loneliest palm") is a species of palm tree of the order Arecales, family Arecaceae, subfamily Arecoideae, tribe Chamaedoreeae. It is found exclusively on the island of Mauritius, and only a single surviving specimen has been documented in the Curepipe Botanic Gardens in Curepipe. Thus, it is classified as an endling.

== Distribution ==
This species is one of nine species of palm which are indigenous to Mauritius, and one of the seven palms which are also endemic.

In the 1700s, this palm species was described from specimens taken from the mountain Pieter Both, where it seems to have been widespread at the time.

H. amaricaulis was believed to be extinct until a single specimen was identified at the Curepipe Botanic Gardens in 1942, the sole known specimen to this day. It is not known if this specimen was planted here, or was a survivor from the area's wild population that became included when the gardens were established.

== Description ==
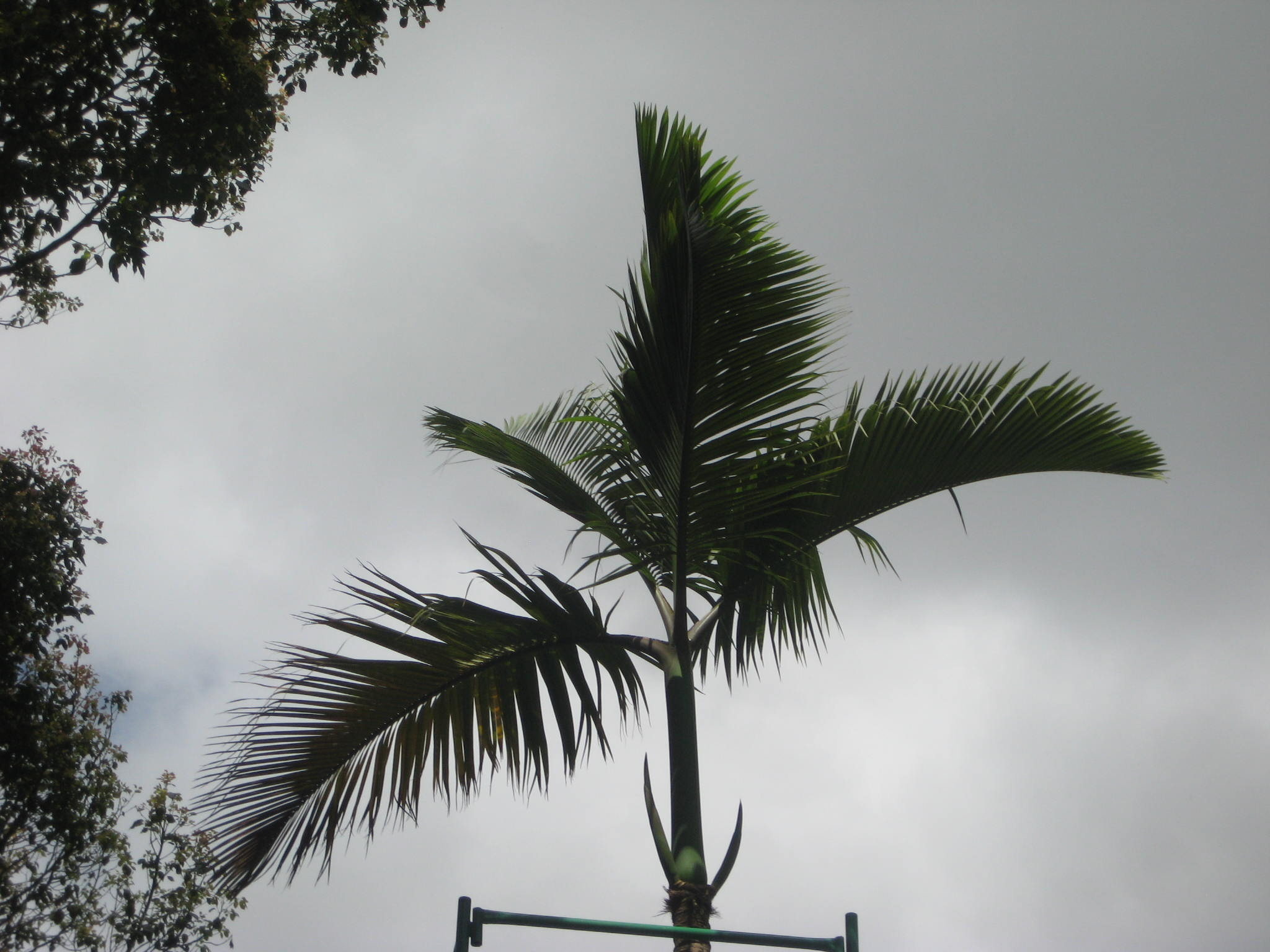
A close-up view of Hyophorbe amaricaulis leaves

The palm is about 12 metres (39 ft) high with a relatively thin gray trunk with a waxy crown shank. The original description of the palm in its former habitat on Pieter Both reported specimens 18 metres (59 ft) tall, but the specimen at Curepipe Botanic Gardens was estimated to be approximately 6 metres (20 ft) tall in 1990. The tree was estimated to have been around 9 metres (30 ft) tall around 2006.

It is related to the bottle palm and spindle palm. It is said to resemble the green variety of H. indica – another Hyophorbe palm species which also does not develop a swollen trunk.

It is reported to have white to cream-colored flowers on an inflorescence with three-ordered branching. Male and female flowers are borne on the same inflorescence, the female flowers opening after the male flowers have fallen off, so seed production is impossible without artificial pollination. During observation of the solitary specimen in 1985, the flowers were visited by flies (Diptera), honeybees (Apis mellifera) and beetles (Coleoptera). Its fruits are 3.8 cm (1.5 in) long and a dull red colour when ripe, but years and years of efforts have not resulted in fertile offspring despite apparently normal embryos and no abnormalities in the pollen. The fruits reportedly take around two years to mature, but frequently drop prematurely due to the palm's senescence.

== Threats ==
A 1990 article noted that fruits from the remaining specimen were sometimes knocked off the tree for the edible gelatinous endosperm. The palm is protected from cyclones and vandals by metal fences and scaffolding. A deep wound has developed on the palm's trunk, raising concerns about bacterial infection.

Due to the extensive deforestation that has occurred on Mauritius since the description of the species, including at the type locality of Pieter Both, it is unlikely there are undiscovered wild individuals of H. amaricaulis. In 1990, surveys of palms labelled as H. amaricaulis in eight botanical gardens across India, Cuba, the United States, Ghana, Canada, Ireland, Australia, and the United Kingdom were conducted. These palms all turned out to be misidentified H. lagenicaulis. In 1998, it was reported that the palms labelled H. amaricaulis at the Cienfuegos Province Botanical Garden in Cuba were unambiguously H. lagenicaulis by visual inspection, while those labelled H. lagenicaulis were visually unlike this species or H. verschaffeltii, raising the probability that these were mislabelled H. amaricaulis. However, morphological and genetic testing in 2000 confirmed these palms to have been correctly labelled as H. lagenicaulis.

== Propagation attempts ==
Efforts to propagate the single remaining specimen have been attempted since at least 1979 without success. Conventional horticultural methods have failed to germinate seeds. In 1979, an inflorescence was sent to the Lucknow National Botanic Garden for tissue culture, but did not arrive in a viable state. Immature seeds were collected in 1985 and sent to Trinity College, Dublin and Wye College for micropropagation. The experiment was published in 1987, where 51 isolated embryos were cultured in vitro, of which 15 grew for four months, three produced roots and two produced shoots, and one embryo grew a true leaf. Further development was not successful.

In June 1985, the palm was reported to have three infructescences and two developing inflorescences, the seeds having apparently normal embryos. Male pollen was collected with a view to pollinating the female flowers when they later opened; however, unusually cold and wet weather caused all the flowers to drop.

In May 1988, efforts to propagate the palm from tissue culture of an inflorescence failed at the Barkly tissue culture laboratory in Mauritius. In June of the same year, pollen was collected from the male flowers for artificial pollination. Seed was set and the fruits were treated with gibberellic acid, but the seeds produced evidently could not be successfully germinated.

In 2006, Kew researcher Dr Viswambharan Sarasan collected ten fruits for tissue culture. In 2010, he reported successful germination in vitro of over 80% of the isolated embryos, the seedlings growing for three months to 25 cm (9.8 in). The seedlings died abruptly for uncertain reasons.

In 2010, Kew scientist Carlos Magdalena collected five fruits from the tree, two of which were eaten by a garden worker, the seeds from the remaining fruits failing to germinate.

It was reported in 2022 that male pollen had been collected from the remaining palm for another attempt at seed production, with plans for replicating on H. amaricaulis a technique developed by the National Botanical Conservatory of Brest to grow isolated H. vaughanii embryos such that they survive transplantation. In the spring of 2023, an immature inflorescence was collected for attempts at tissue culture by Brest Botanical Conservatory; as of March 2024, a small cluster of viable cells could be extracted after two failures.
