= List of botanical gardens in Mauritius =

Botanical gardens in Mauritius have collections consisting entirely of Mauritius native and endemic species; most have a collection that include plants from around the world. There are botanical gardens and arboreta in all states and territories of Mauritius, most are administered by local governments, some are privately owned.

- Curepipe Botanic Gardens
- Sir Seewoosagur Ramgoolam Botanical Garden
