= H. indica =

H. indica may refer to:

- Heterorhabditis indica, a nematode species
- Hyophorbe indica, the palmiste poison or palmier bâtard, a flowering plant species
- Hystrix indica, the Indian crested porcupine, an Old World porcupine species

== Synonyms ==
- Hippoxylon indica, a synonym for Oroxylum indicum, a tree species

== See also ==
- Indica (disambiguation)
