= Sainte Therese Church =

Church in Curepipe, Mauritius

Sainte Therese Church is the largest Catholic church in Curepipe and one of the largest churches in Mauritius.

It includes two high schools; one exclusively for girls, and the other exclusively for boys. It is situated on the main street of Curepipe about 100 meters from the town hall.

== See also ==
- Catholic Church in Mauritius
