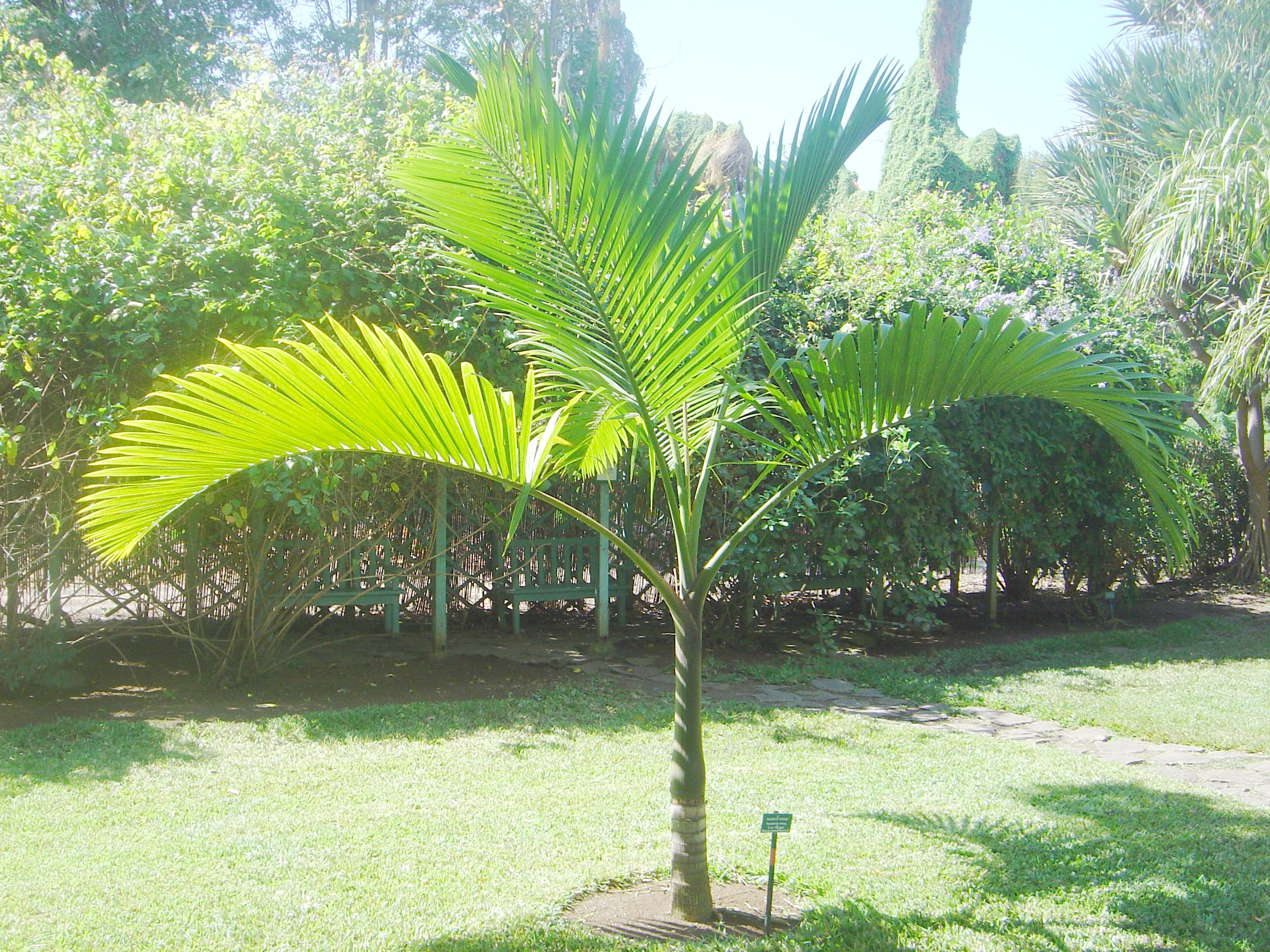
- Hyophorbe indica

Scientific classification
- Kingdom: Plantae
- Clade: Embryophytes
- Clade: Tracheophytes
- Clade: Spermatophytes
- Clade: Angiosperms
- Clade: Monocots
- Clade: Commelinids
- Order: Arecales
- Family: Arecaceae
- Subfamily: Arecoideae
- Tribe: Chamaedoreeae
- Genus: Hyophorbe; Gaertn.

Synonyms
- Sublimia Comm. ex Mart; Mascarena L.H.Bailey

= Hyophorbe =

Genus of palms

Hyophorbe is a genus of five known species of flowering plants in the family Arecaceae, native to the Mascarene Islands in the Indian Ocean. All five species can attain heights of over 6 meters, and two of the species develop swollen trunks that have made them popular as ornamentals, but all of them are endangered in the wild.

It contains the following species:

Image	Scientific name	Distribution
	Hyophorbe amaricaulis Mart.	Mauritius, 1 individual left
	Hyophorbe indica Gaertn. (palmiste poison)	Réunion
	Hyophorbe lagenicaulis (L.H.Bailey) H.E.Moore (bottle palm)	Île Ronde
	Hyophorbe vaughanii L.H.Bailey	Mauritius
	Hyophorbe verschaffeltii H.Wendl. (palmiste marron)	Rodrigues Island

== Species gallery ==
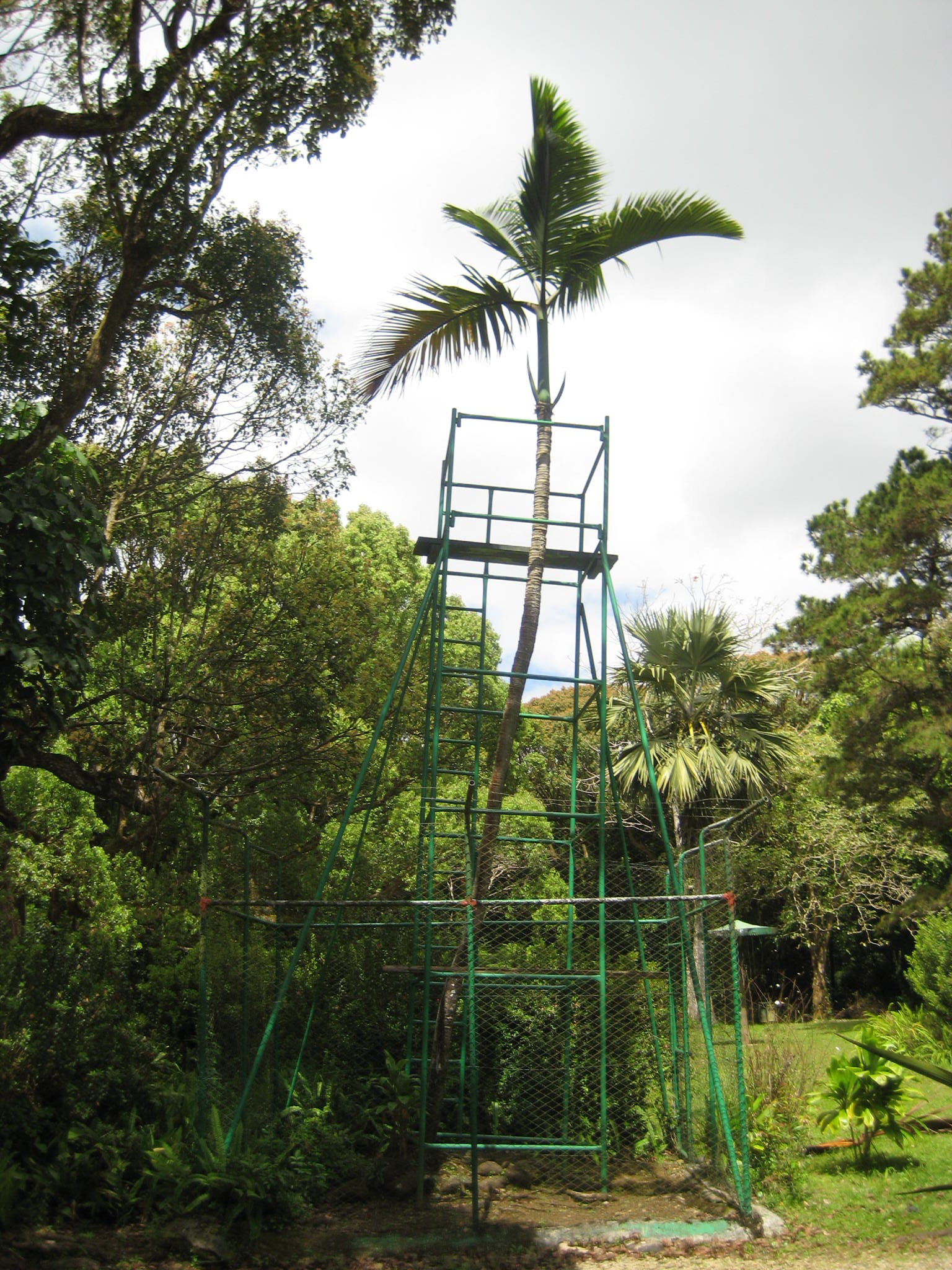
The last surviving specimen of Hyophorbe amaricaulis. This species has a slender, unswollen trunk.

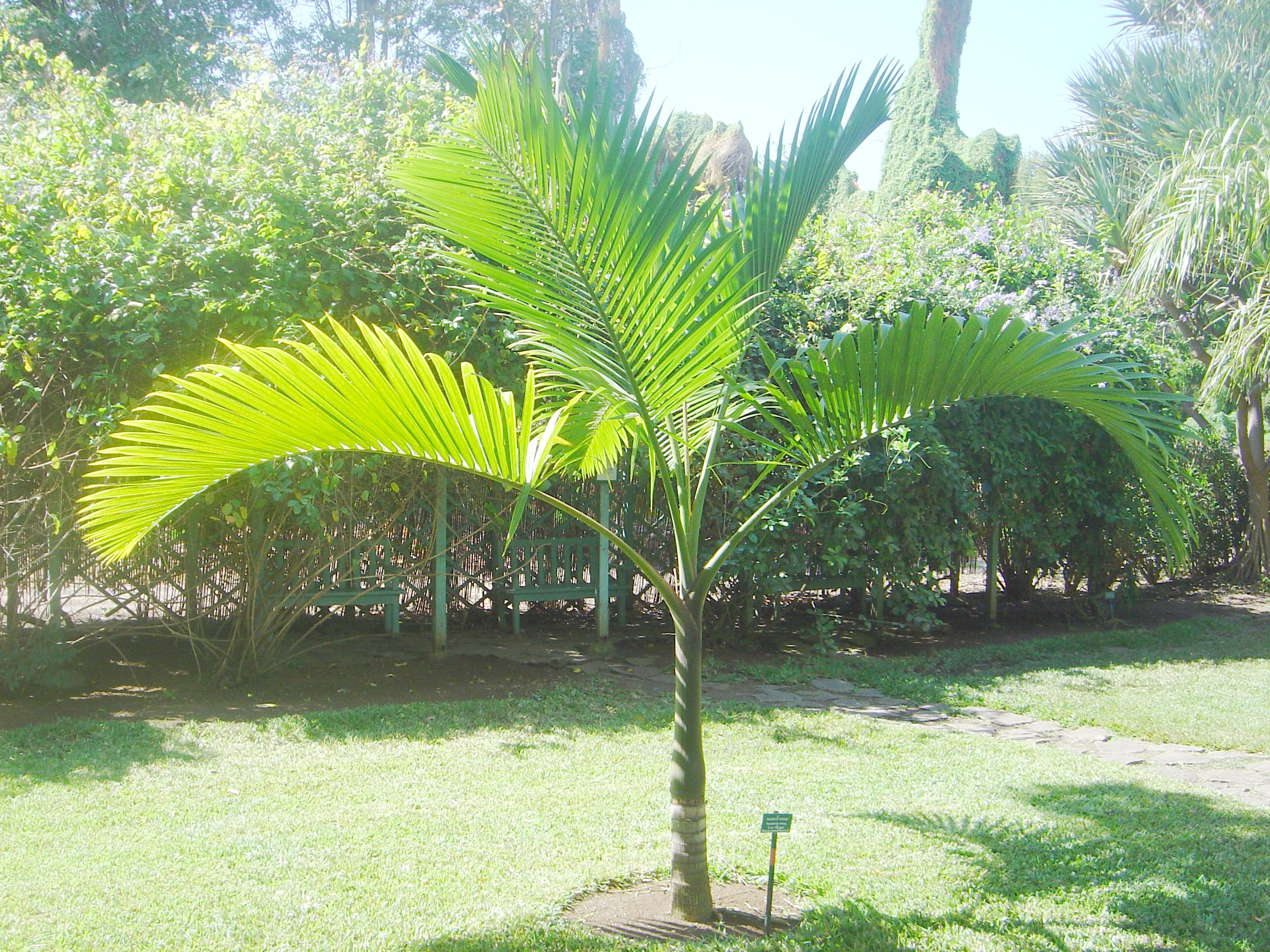
Hyophorbe indica is another slender-trunk species, but often with yellow veins along its foliage.

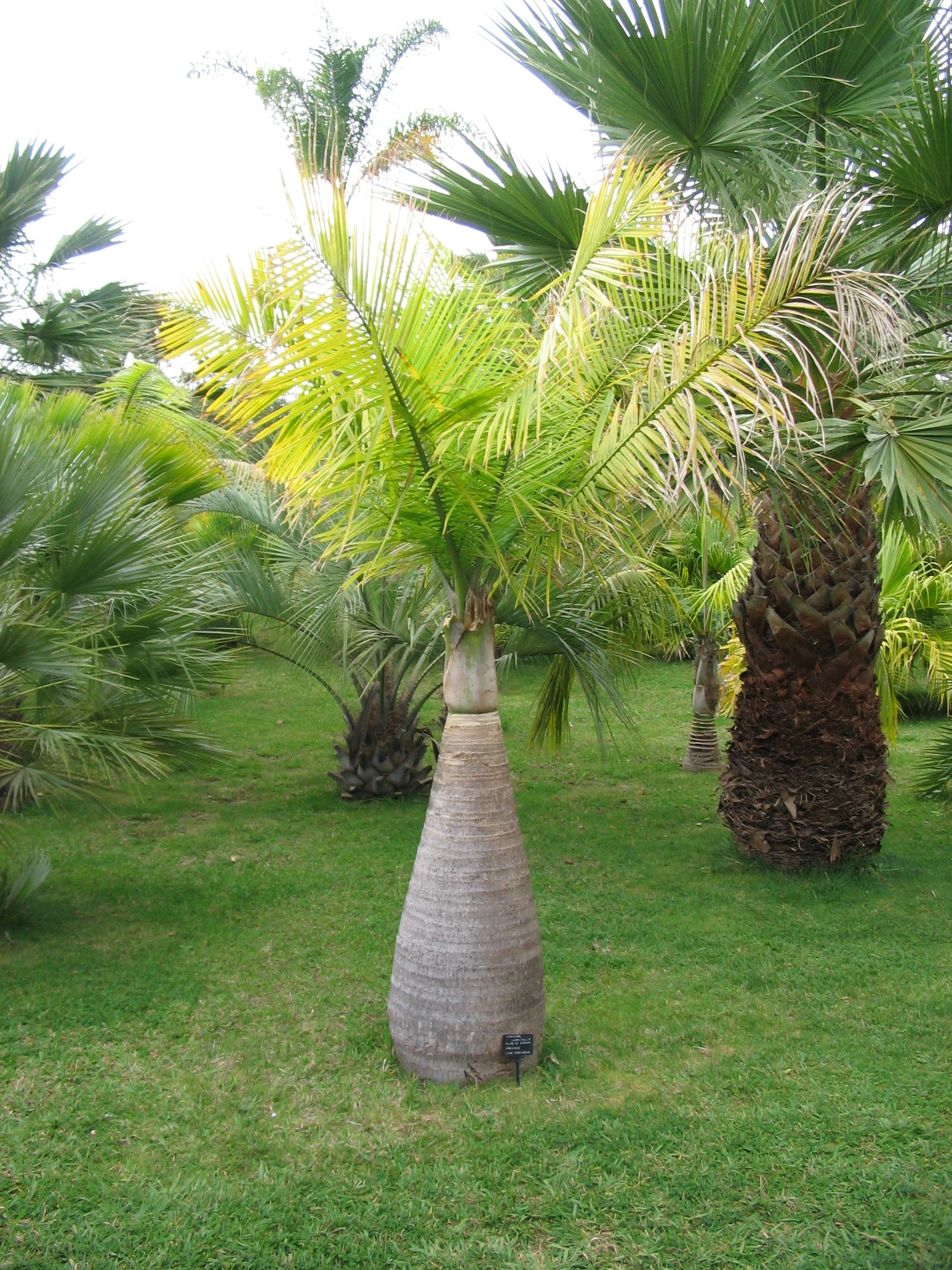
Hyophorbe lagenicaulis is known as the "bottle palm" as it trunks swells from near the base, into a bottle shape.

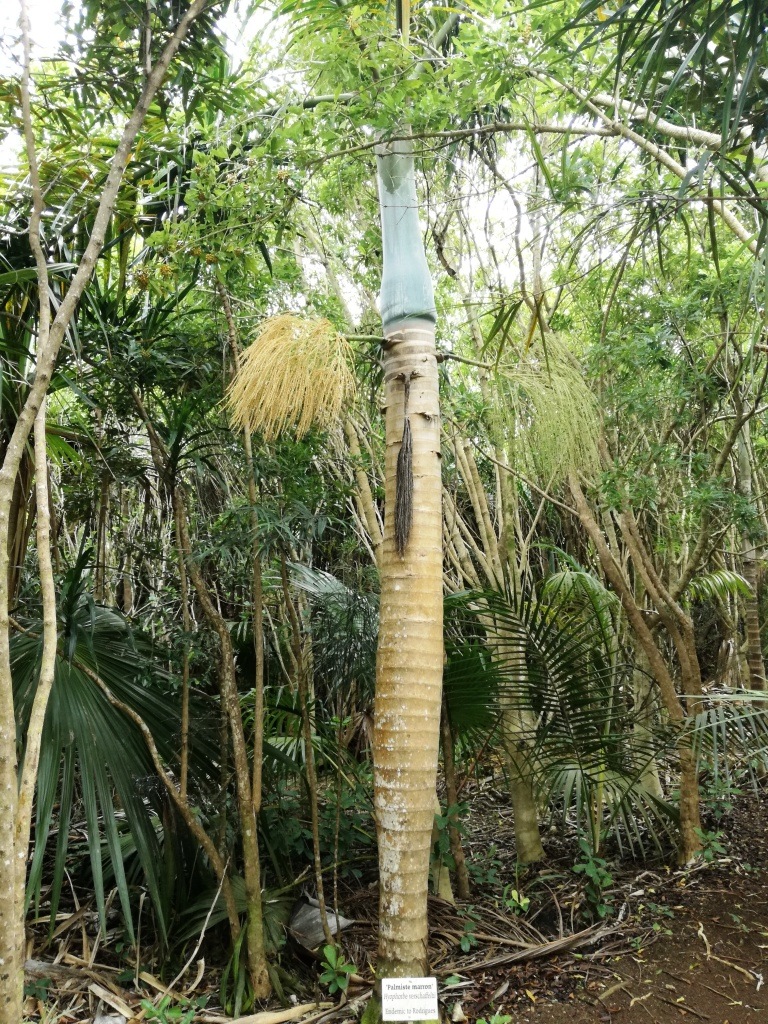
Hyophorbe verschaffeltii is known as the "spindle palm" as its trunk swells in the middle. It has black fruits and yellow-green foliage.
