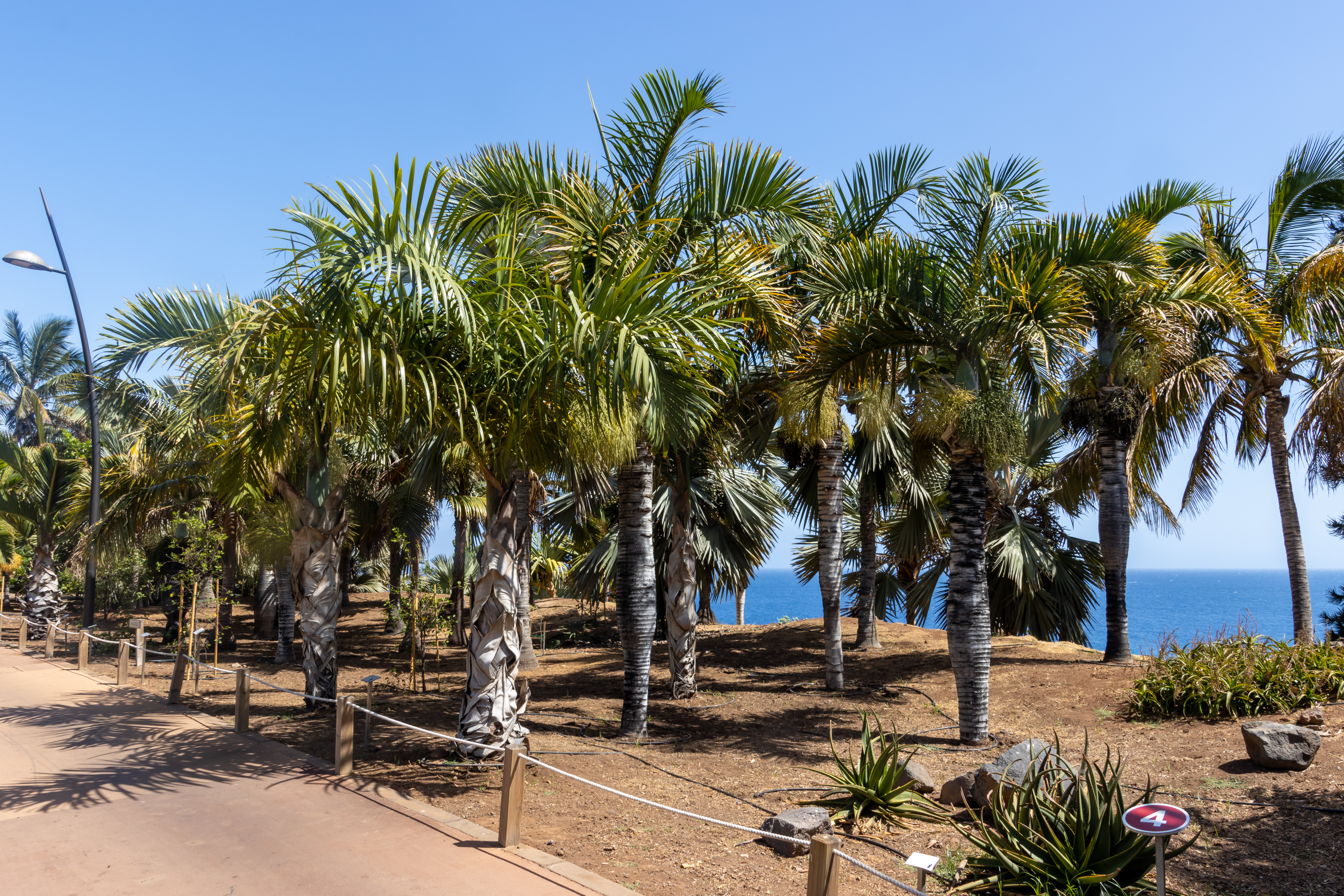

Conservation status
- Critically Endangered (IUCN 3.1)

Scientific classification
- Kingdom: Plantae
- Clade: Tracheophytes
- Clade: Angiosperms
- Clade: Monocots
- Clade: Commelinids
- Order: Arecales
- Family: Arecaceae
- Genus: Hyophorbe
- Species: H. verschaffeltii

Binomial name
- Hyophorbe verschaffeltii H.A. Wendl.

= Hyophorbe verschaffeltii =

Species of palm

Hyophorbe verschaffeltii, the palmiste marron or spindle palm, is a critically endangered species of flowering plant in the family Arecaceae. It is endemic to Rodrigues island, Mauritius, but is widely grown in cultivation.

== Description ==
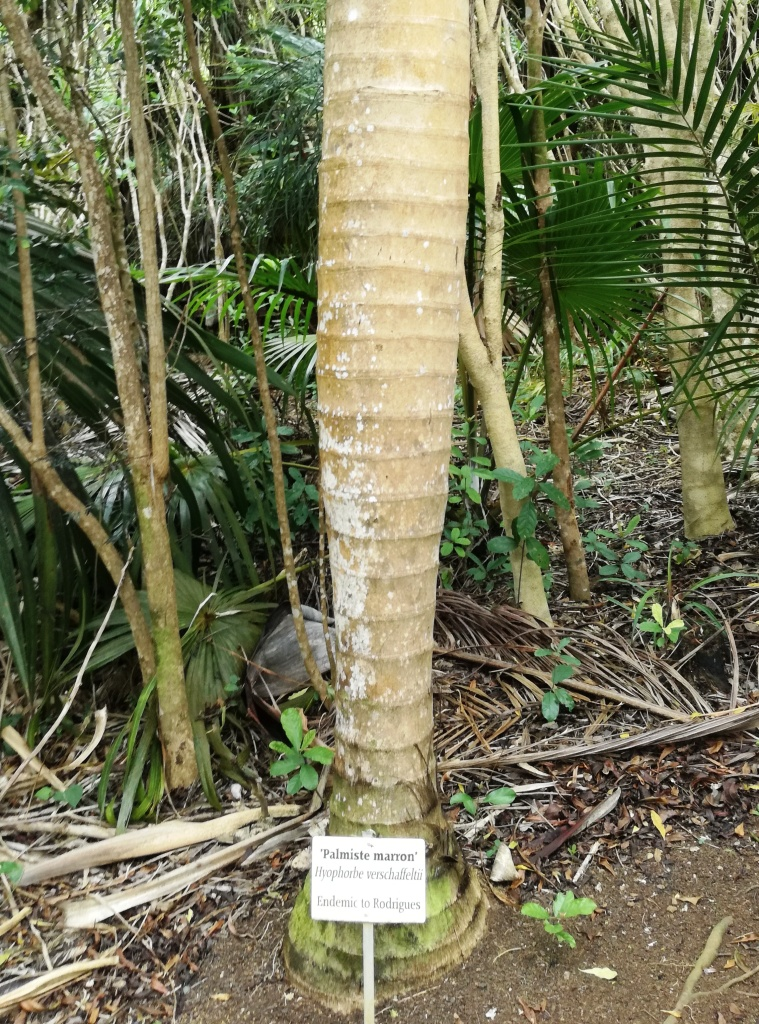
The trunk of Hyophorbe verschaffeltii starts to swell in the middle, but becomes thinner with age.

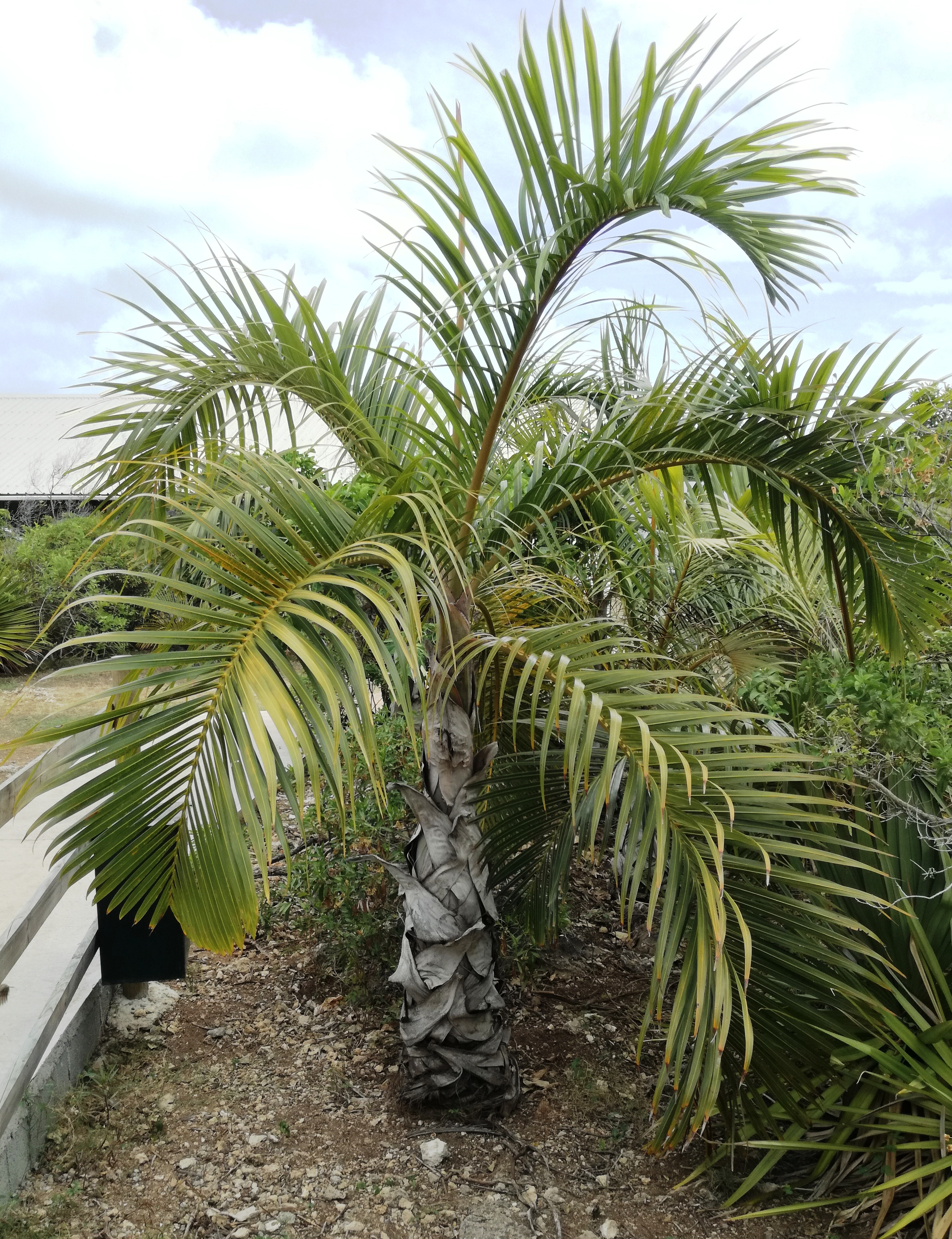
The foliage of young plants can sometimes have a yellowish colour

The spindle palm is 6 metres (20 ft) tall, and have lightly recurved pinnate leaves. They are elegant looking and are prized for landscape in the tropical and semi-tropical areas of the world. They are fairly short with 8–10 leaves that are held somewhat erect. Spindle palms have a crownshaft that becomes a light gray-green as the palm ages. Horn-like flower spikes emerge from below the crownshaft on mature specimens. Their fruits darken to a black colour when ripe. It was named after Ambroise Verschaffelt (1825–1886).

It sometimes resembles its closest relative, the "bottle palm" (Hyophorbe lagenicaulis). Both of these species develop swollen trunks. However the spindle palm's trunk starts to swell in the middle (assuming the shape of a spindle). The bottle palm's trunk continues to swell at the base (often resembling the shape of a bottle). The spindle palm's foliage also has a more yellowish colour.

== Distribution ==
Spindle palms are endemic to Rodrigues island, Mauritius. It is threatened by habitat loss. There are only fifty or so specimens left in the wild, although its survival as a species is guaranteed due to ubiquitous cultivation in tropical areas of the planet.

== Cultivation ==
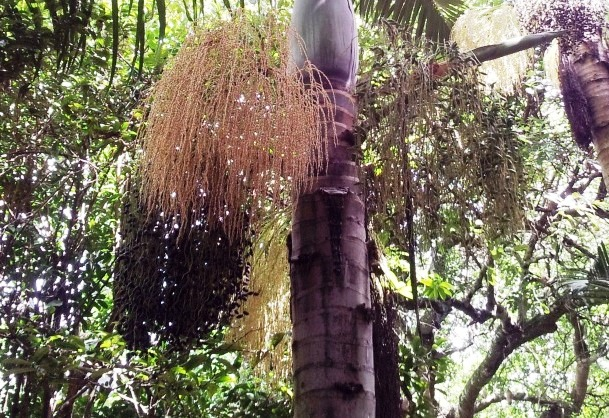
The fruits of the Spindle Palm are the smallest in the genus (1.2–1.9cm) and they darken to black when ripe.

Spindle palms are fairly cold intolerant. They are defoliated at 32 °F (0 °C) and may be killed at anything below that. If the palm does survive a freeze, the next few emerging leaves are stunted. Spindle palms grow in the US in south Florida and in isolated favored microclimates along the coastlines of the Tampa-St.Petersburg-Clearwater areas as well as the Cape Canaveral and Satellite Beach areas of central Florida. They do make good container plants that can be protected from a freeze.
