= Lycée La Bourdonnais =

Location
- Rue Rochecouste - Forest Side - Curepipe - MAURICE
- Coordinates: 20.325313°S 57.52939300000003°E

Information
- Founded: 1953
- Website: llb.school

Lycée La Bourdonnais (LLB) is a French international school in Curepipe, Mauritius. It serves primary school through lycée (senior high school/sixth form).

It was founded in 1953.
