= Municipal Council of Curepipe =

Coordinates: 20.318777°S 57.526297°E

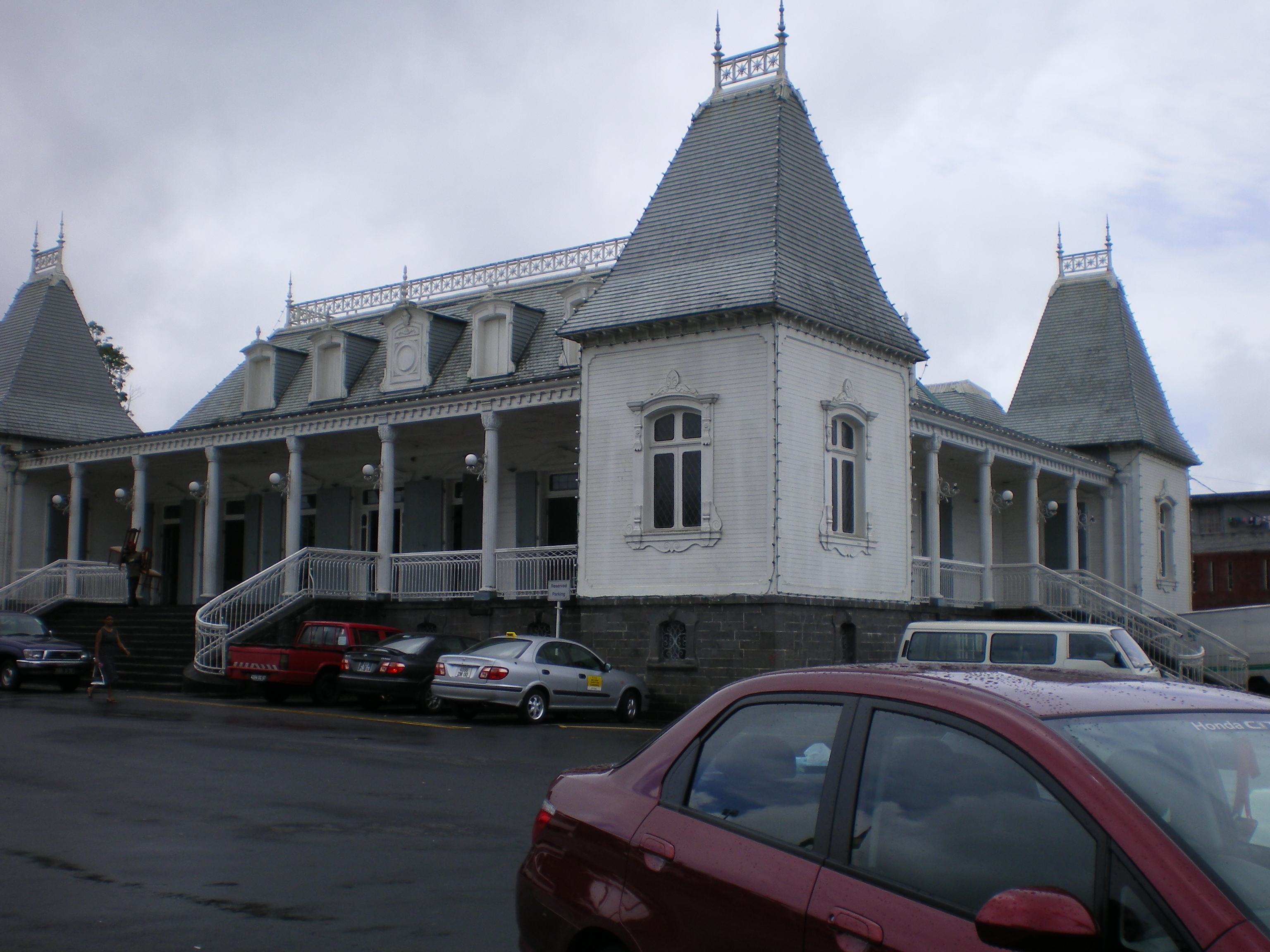
Town hall of Curepipe

The Municipal Council of Curepipe (French: Conseil Municipal de Curepipe), also known as Municipality, is the local authority responsible for the administration of the town of Curepipe, Plaines Wilhems District, in the island nation of Mauritius. The current mayor is Mr. Dhaneshwar Bissonauth.
