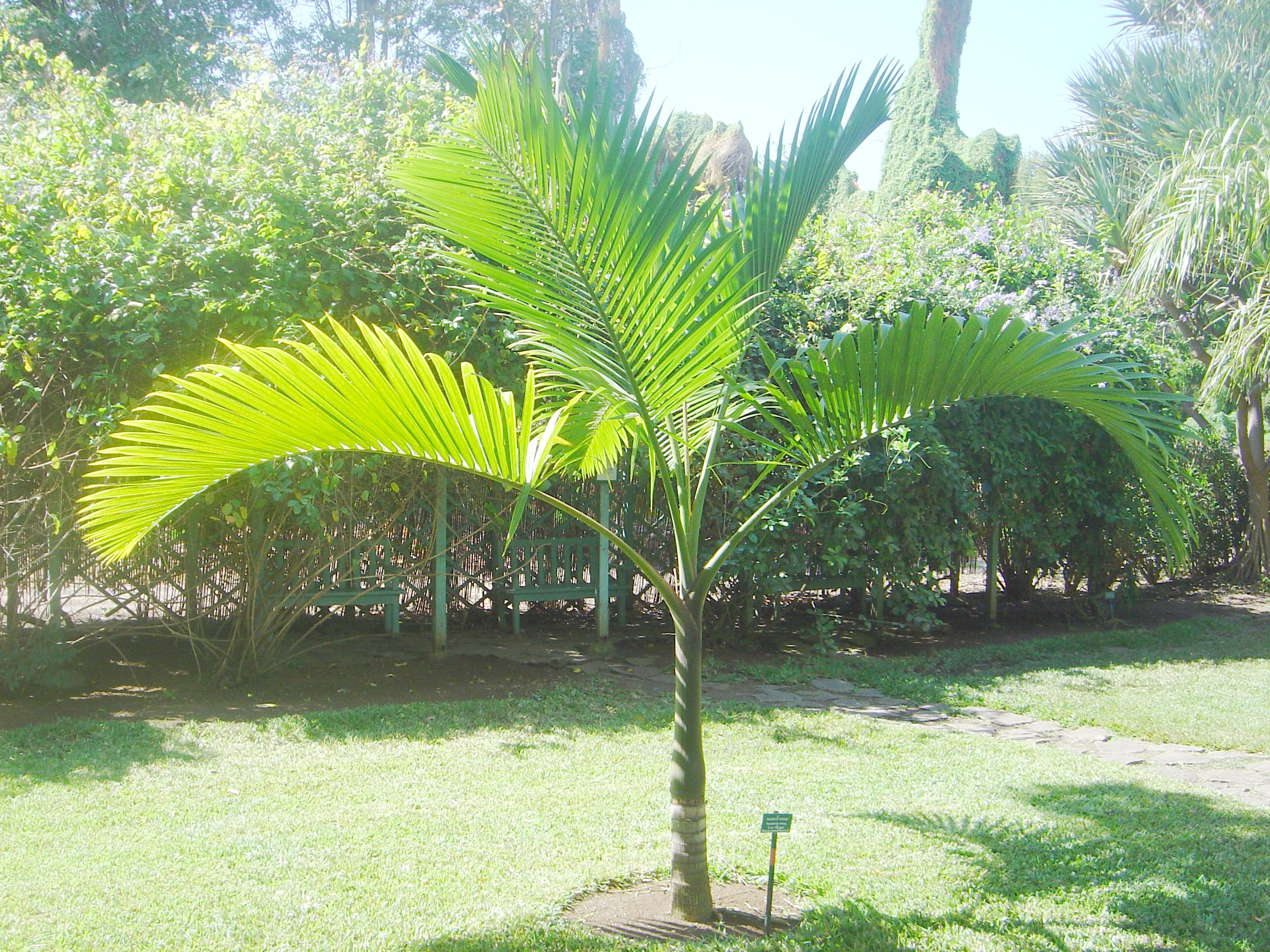

Conservation status
- Endangered (IUCN 2.3)

Scientific classification
- Kingdom: Plantae
- Clade: Tracheophytes
- Clade: Angiosperms
- Clade: Monocots
- Clade: Commelinids
- Order: Arecales
- Family: Arecaceae
- Genus: Hyophorbe
- Species: H. indica

Binomial name
- Hyophorbe indica Gaertner

= Hyophorbe indica =

Species of palm

Hyophorbe indica, known commonly as palmier bâtard, palmiste poison, or champagne palm, is a species of flowering plant in the family Arecaceae. It is endemic to the island of Réunion. It is threatened by habitat loss.

== Description ==
The trunk of the tree is slender and is about 10 metres (33 ft) in height. It resembles the related Hyophorbe amaricaulis and Hyophorbe vaughanii, but with an inflorescence that branches in four (rather than three) orders, and orange-red fruits. The palm comes in 2 colours: The green one grows in the east coast of the Réunion, while the red one is endemic to Tampon region.

== Habitat ==
The palm can be found growing in moist forests on the elevation of 175–600 metres (574–1,969 ft).
