= Trou aux Cerfs =

Volcano in Curepipe, Mauritius

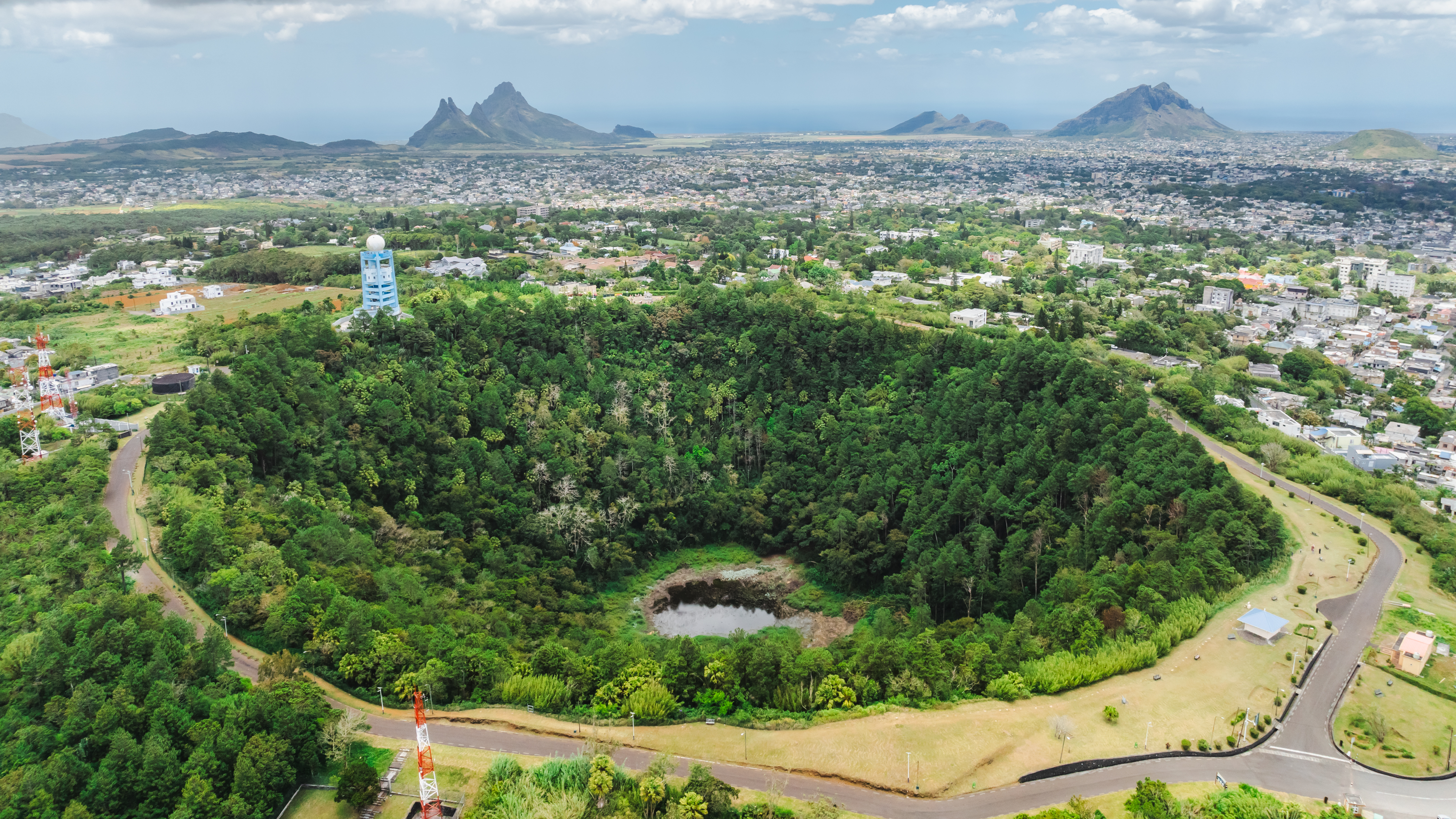
- Crater of Trou aux Cerfs

Highest point
- Elevation: 605 m (1,985 ft)
- Coordinates: 20°18′54″S 57°30′18″E

Geography
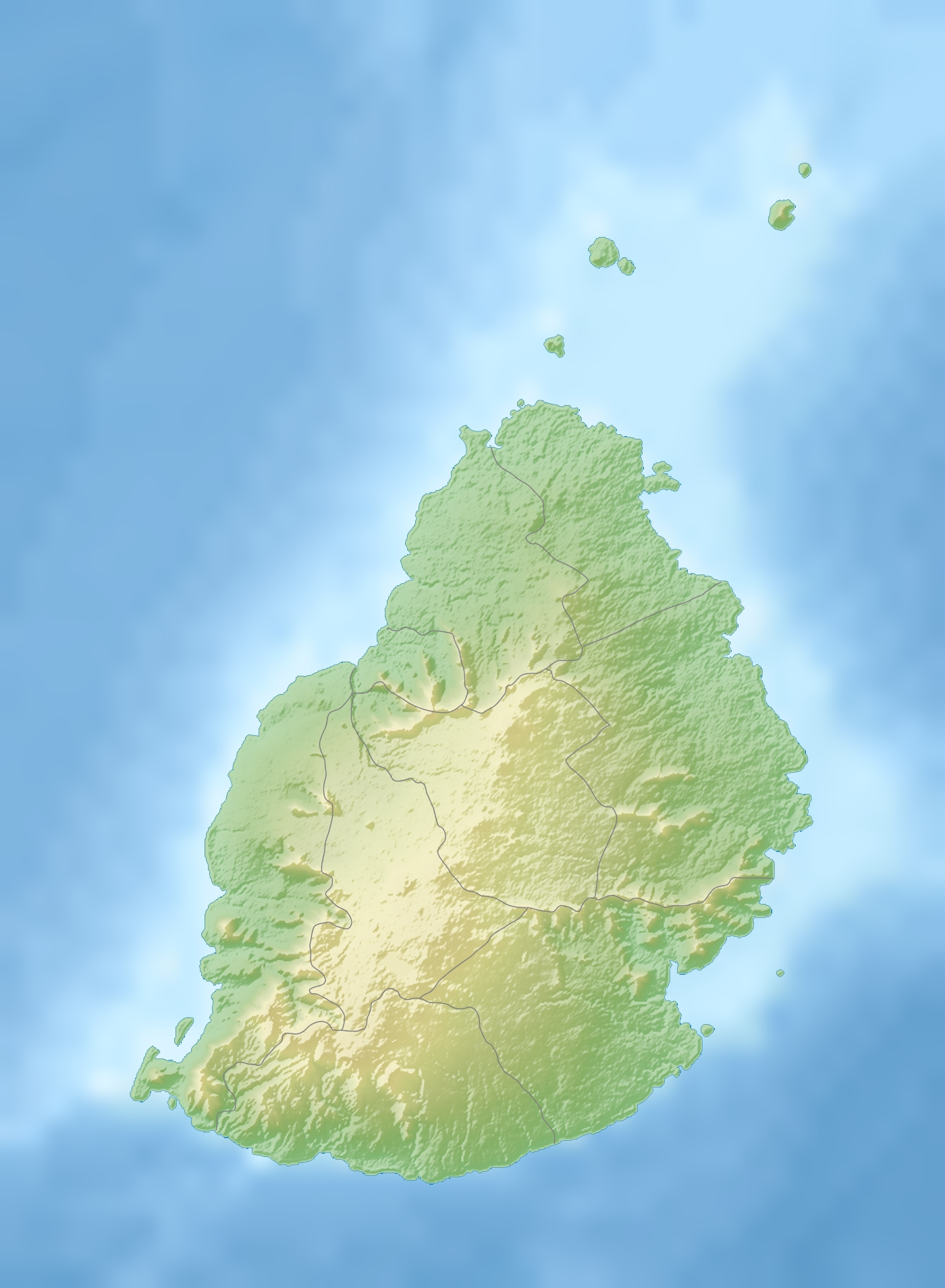
- Location within Mauritius
- Location: Curepipe, Mauritius

Geology
- Mountain type: Dormant - Volcanic crater

Climbing
- Easiest route: Car/Walking

Trou aux Cerfs (also known as Murr's Volcano) is a dormant, crater lake, cinder cone volcano with a well-defined cone and crater. It is 605 m (1,985 ft) high and located in Curepipe, Mauritius. The crater has been alternately described as 300 and 350 meters in diameter, and is 80 meters deep.

The crater was formed less than 2 million years ago in the second phase of volcanic activity that created Mauritius.

According to experts, the volcano is currently dormant but could become active at any time within the next thousand years. It last erupted 700,000 years ago.

== Wildlife on the volcano ==
=== Fauna ===
Currently, the only mammals living on the volcano are the long-tailed macaque (Macaca fascicularis) and the fruit bat (Pteropus niger).

Lots of exotic birds are found here, including the red fody (Foudia madagascariensis), but the endemic bird species are the martin (Phedina borbonica) and the swiftlet (Aerodramus francicus).

=== Flora ===
Two species of the genus Trochetia are found here. They are Trochetia blackburniana and the very rare Trochetia triflora.

The most common exotic tree found here is the pine tree (Pinus massoniana), but the endemic plants include the manglier (Sideroxylon puberulum) and the fanjan (Alsophila sp.)

== See also ==
- Ganga Talao
