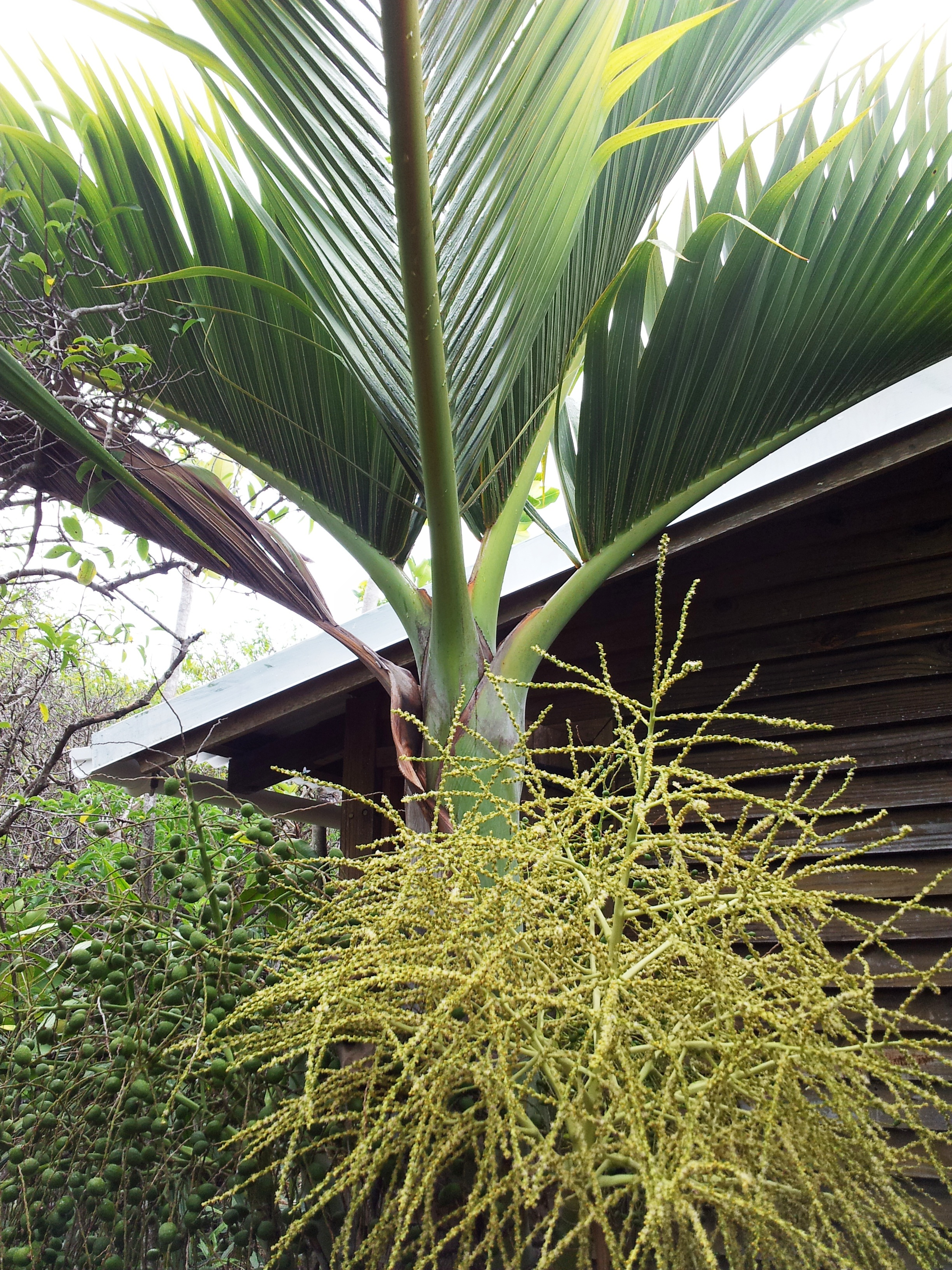

Conservation status
- Critically Endangered (IUCN 2.3)

Scientific classification
- Kingdom: Plantae
- Clade: Tracheophytes
- Clade: Angiosperms
- Clade: Monocots
- Clade: Commelinids
- Order: Arecales
- Family: Arecaceae
- Genus: Hyophorbe
- Species: H. vaughanii

Binomial name
- Hyophorbe vaughanii L.H.Bailey

= Hyophorbe vaughanii =

Species of palm

Hyophorbe vaughanii is a species of flowering plant in the family Arecaceae that is endemic to Mauritius. Its natural habitat is subtropical or tropical dry forests.

== Description ==
The plant has prominent rings on the trunk and arch-like leaves, both of which make it differ from other species. Its trunk is slender, and does not swell up as some of its relatives do.

Unlike the other Hyophorbe species, its foliage has an orange tint. Its inflorescence is also simpler, and only branches into three orders, a character shared only with the last remaining specimen of Hyophorbe amaricaulis. Its fruits are orange or reddish brown, and 4.4–5 cm long (by far the largest of the genus).

== Distribution ==
There is only a single 'wild' population in the world, occurring on the island of Mauritius. Conservation efforts have enabled reintroductions of this critically endangered species into managed upland forest reserves, including such places as Brise Fer, Mauritius-Macchabee, Mare Longue, and Florin.

It is one of three Hyophorbe species which naturally occur in Mauritius. The "bottle palm" (Hyophorbe lagenicaulis) is the only other species that is commonly grown (Hyophorbe amaricaulis survives only as a single specimen). However the bottle palm has a swollen, bottle-shaped trunk when young, and much smaller (2.5 cm) orange or black fruits. The Bottle palm also has a more complex inflorescence that branches in four orders, rather than H.vaughaniis three.

== Habitat ==
The plant can be found growing naturally at the altitude of 400–550 metres (1,310–1,800 ft) in tropical montane rainforest. It is increasingly used as an ornamental for landscaping across the whole of Mauritius though.
