= Curepipe =

Curepipe La Ville-Lumière
- Town
- Curepipe
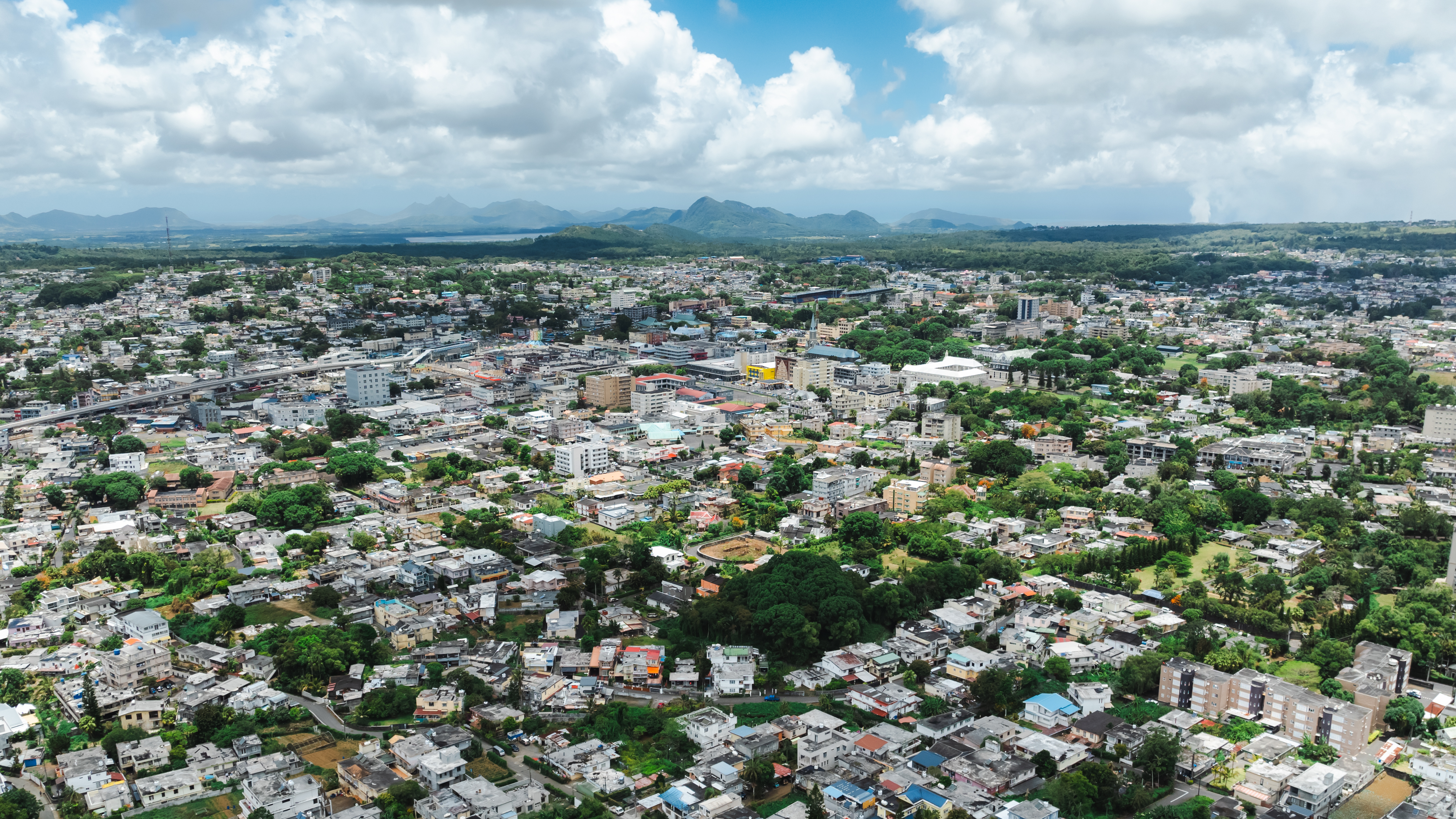
- Aerial view of Curepipe.

- Seal
- Motto: "Exselsus Splendeo" (Latin) (Meaning "Exalted Shine" in English)
- Municipal Council location
- Coordinates: 20°19′7.59″S 57°31′34.66″E
- Country: Mauritius
- District: Plaines Wilhems

Government
  - Type: Municipality
  - Mayor: Mr. Dhaneshwar Bissonauth
  - Deputy Mayor: Mrs. Marie Ami

Area
  - Total: 24 km^{2} (9.3 sq mi)
- Elevation: 561 m (1,841 ft)

Population (2018)
  - Total: 78,618
  - Rank: 4th in Mauritius
  - Density: 3,300/km^{2} (8,500/sq mi)
- Time zone: UTC+4 (MUT)
- Climate: Cfa
- Website: municipal-curepipe.org

Curepipe (Mauritian Creole pronunciation: [kiːəpip]), also known as La Ville-Lumière (The City of Light), is a town in Mauritius, located mainly in the Plaines Wilhems District. Its eastern part lies in the Moka District. Known for its colonial architecture, the town is administered by the Municipal Council of Curepipe. Curepipe lies at a higher elevation, often referred to as the "Central Plateau". According to the census made by Statistics Mauritius in 2018, the population of the town was at 78,618.

== Etymology ==
The town's name, Curepipe, is said to be originated from the French curer sa pipe, which translates to "cleaning his/her pipe". There are several theories by historians as to the naming of the city. Some historians believe that the name was given as travellers and soldiers from the 19th century often travelled from Port Louis and Grand Port (now Mahébourg) to refill their pipes in Curepipe. Other historians believe that the name was given after a late landowner during the 18th century.

== Geography ==
The town officially covers an area of 23.8 square kilometres (9.2 sq mi). It is located in the Plaine Wilhems district on the central plateau of Mauritius at an altitude of 561 meters. Of the larger towns of the island's central plateau, Curepipe is the most southern and also the highest. As a consequence of its height, Curepipe is known for its relatively cooler and rainier climate. The dormant volcano Trou aux Cerfs is nearby.

== Politics ==
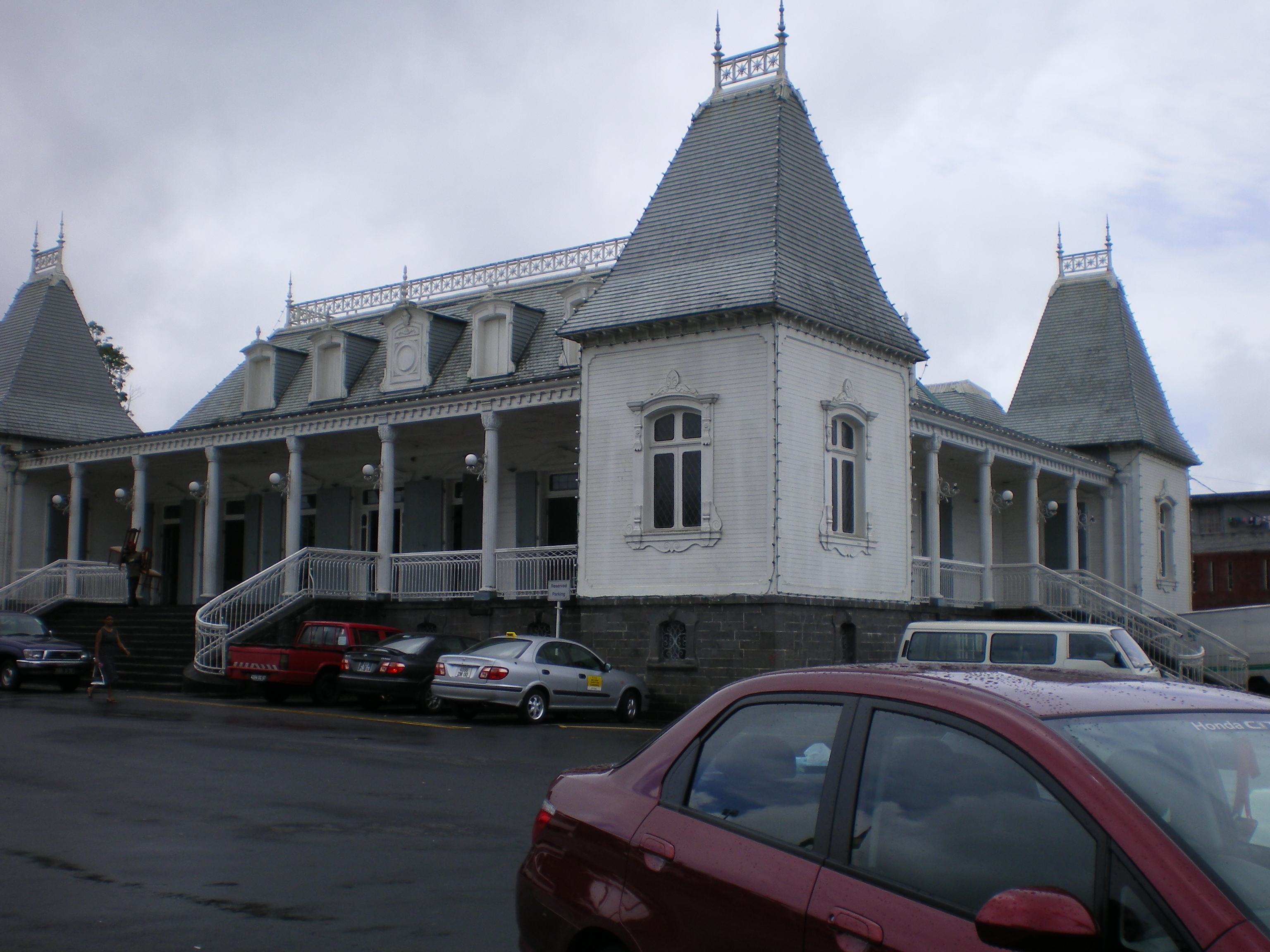
The Old Town hall of Curepipe

Curepipe is managed by a council, which is democratically elected by its citizens. The council is headed by the mayor and is principally responsible for local policy making. The current mayor is Mr. Dhaneshwar Bissonauth. The town's administration on the other hand is responsible for the implementation of these policies as well as the day-to-day management of the council's activities. The current administrative head is Mrs Jugroop.

Curepipe's historic town hall was actually originally situated in Moka, and the whole building was moved to Curepipe in 1903.

For the general elections the town is classified as the No 17 constituency known as Curepipe and Midlands.

== Demographics ==
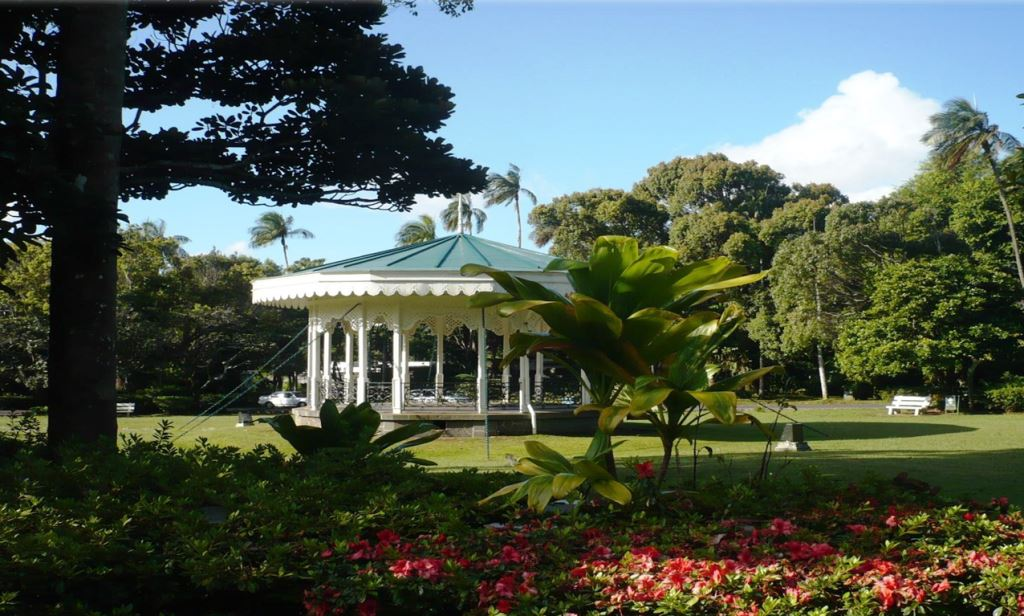
The Curepipe Botanical Gardens

According to the census made by Statistics Mauritius in 2018, the population of the town was at 78,692. The primary spoken language is Mauritian Creole, though French predominates in more formal situations. Tamil, Bhojpuri, Hindi, Telugu, Urdu, Mandarin and Hakka Chinese are also spoken as second or third language mostly in religious activities. The council's official language is English.

=== Religion ===
Religious affiliation
Catholic	39.2%
Protestant and other Christians	9.3%
Hinduism	37.7%
Islam	13.9%

According to the 2012 census conducted by Statistics Mauritius, Christianity is the most prevalently practised religion in Curepipe (48.4%) (Catholic 39.2%, Protestant 1.3%, Other Christian 8%), followed by Hinduism (37.7%) and Islam (13.9%).

== Economic activities ==
The town hosts several textile factories, a diamond processing industry and a range of jewelry businesses. In addition, handicraft shops, restaurants and shopping centres add to the commercial mix of the town. The relatively affluent suburbs are also home to a great deal of business activity.

Sensitization programmes are underway in collaboration with the Central Water Authority of Mauritius, towards encouraging better management of the town's water resources.

== Tourism ==
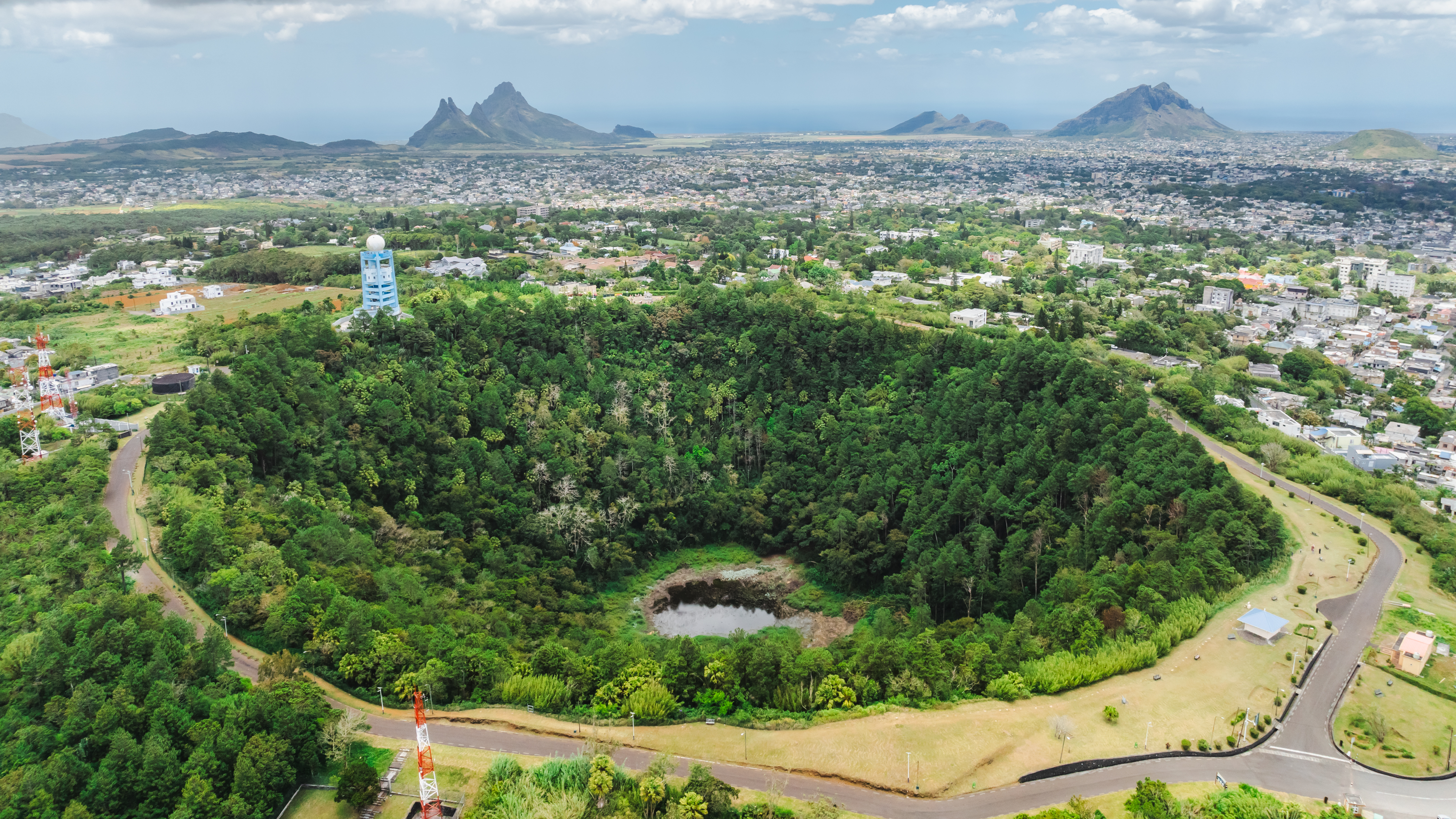
The view down into Trou aux Cerfs crater.

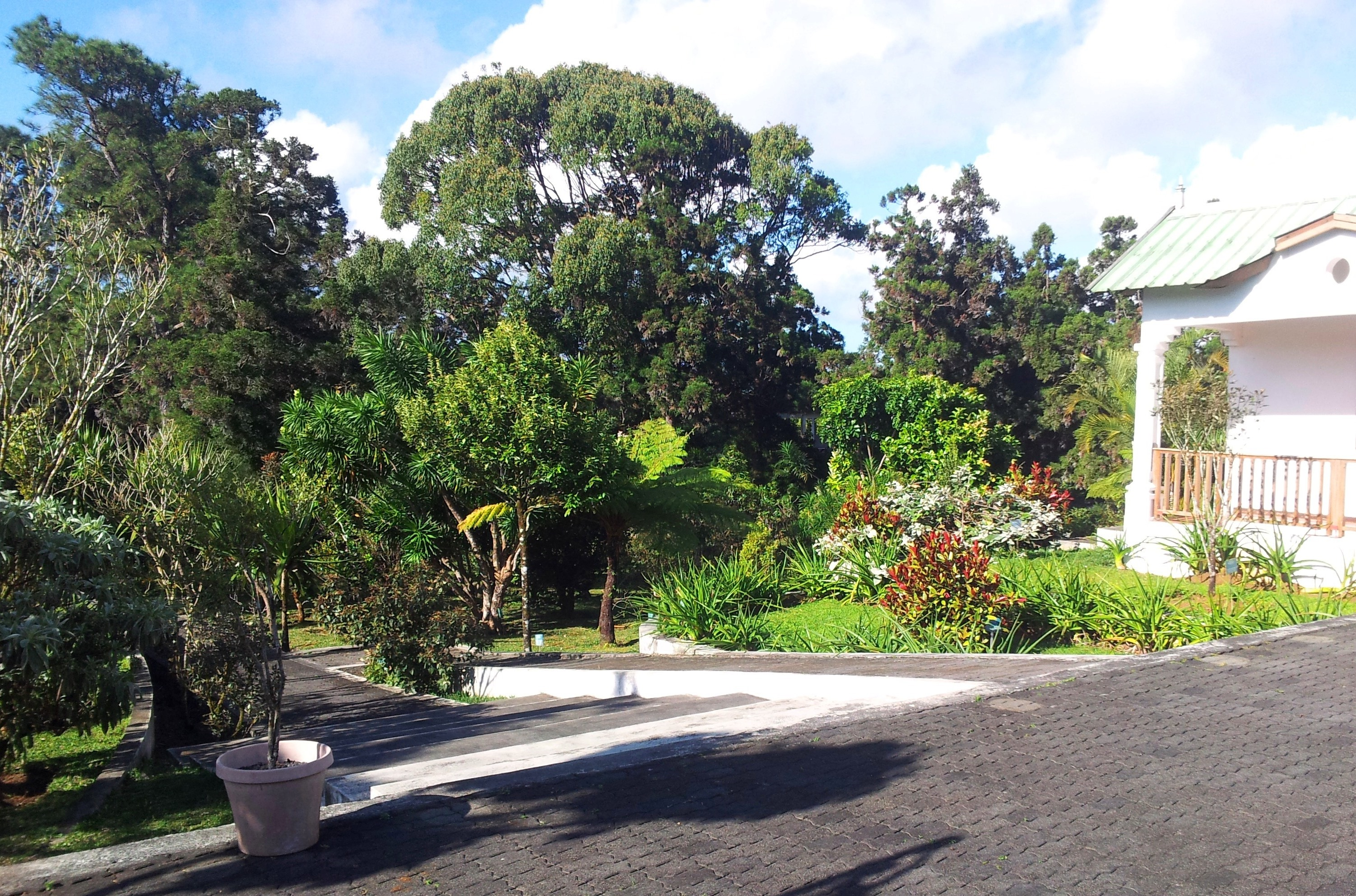
Visitors Centre and entrance at Monvert Nature Park

Curepipe, though inland from the main coastal tourist areas of Mauritius, is nonetheless a tourist destination. Some of the more popular attractions include:

- Curepipe Botanic Gardens
- Trou aux Cerfs Crater
- Monvert Nature Park
- Sainte Therese Church
- Domaine des Aubineaux
- Casino de Maurice
- St. Joseph's College (National Heritage)
- Royal College Curepipe (National Heritage)

Other attractions include the old Town Hall, the Basilica of Sainte Helene, La Sabloniere and the Carnegie Library of Curepipe. Opened to the public in 1920, it still serves as Curepipe's public library.

== Education ==
St. Joseph's College

Curepipe is home to various secondary schools which include the Ambassador College, Floreal SSS, Curepipe College, Dar-ul-Maarif Secondary School, Doha Secondary School, Dunputh Lallah SSS, Forest Side SSS Boys, Forest Side SSS Girls, Full Day School, Hindu Girls College, Imperial College, Loreto College Curepipe, Lycée Labourdonnais, Mauricia Institute, Mauritius College Boys, Mauritius College Girls, Notre Dame College, Ocep College, Presidency College Boys, Presidency College Girls, Renaissance College, St Patrick's College, Royal College Curepipe and St. Joseph's College.

== Sports ==
The town is home to the Stade George V, the teams of the town are the Curepipe Starlight SC and the current champions Cercle de Joachim, they currently play in the National First Division for the 2015–2016 season.

== Notable people ==
Birth place of UCI World Tour professional cyclist Kimberley Le Court. The first African athlete to wear the Yellow Jersey in the Tour De France Femmes.

== Suburbs ==
The town of Curepipe is divided into different regions.

- Allée Brillant
- Résidence Atlee
- Couvent Lorette
- Curepipe Road
- Eau-Coulée
- Engrais-Cathan
- Engrais-Martial
- Floréal
- Forest-Side
- Malherbes
- Wooton
- Camp Caval
- Cité Joachim
- Cité St-Luc
- Cité Loyseau
- Mangalkhan
- Robinson
- Les Casernes
- Route du Jardin
- La Brasserie
- Camp Pierrot
- Cité Anoska

== Twin towns – sister cities ==
Curepipe is twinned with:

- Meixian (Meizhou), China
- La Teste-de-Buch, France
- ITA Castel_Gandolfo, Italy

== See also ==
- List of places in Mauritius
