= Curepipe Botanic Gardens =

Coordinates: 20.3291°S 57.5244°E

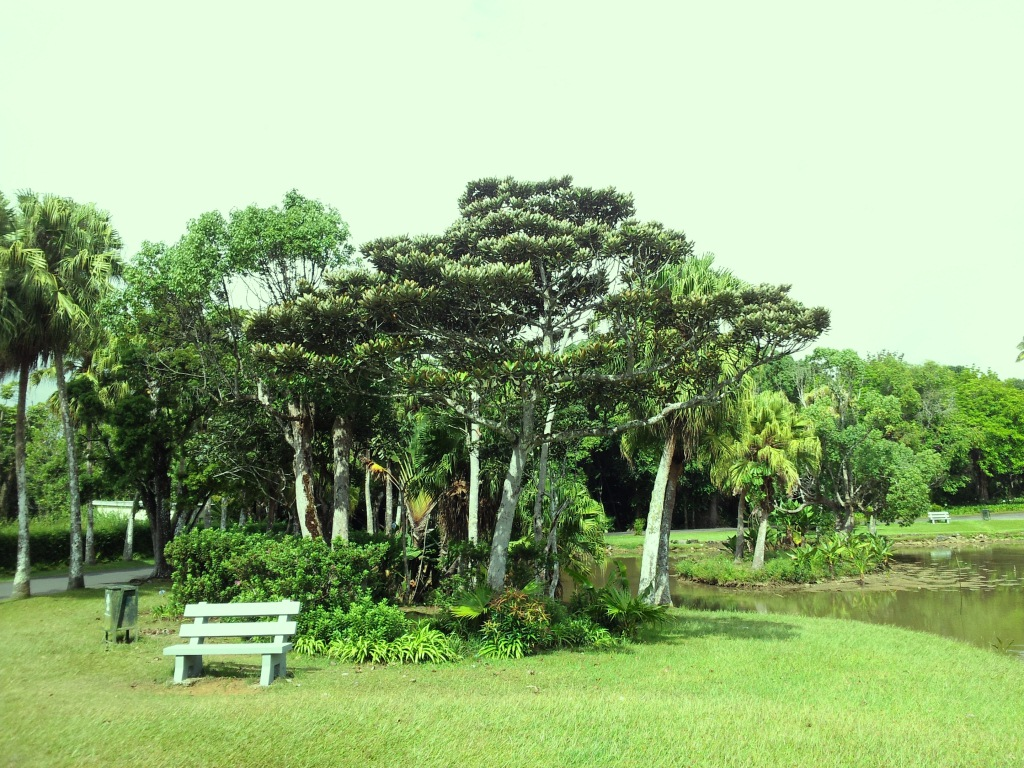
View near the gardens' main lake.

Curepipe Botanic Gardens (or SSR Botanical Garden of Curepipe) in Route des Jardins, Curepipe, is the second largest botanical garden in Mauritius.

It has a relatively informal layout, and contains a river, lake and the world's rarest palm tree among other attractions.

== History and composition ==
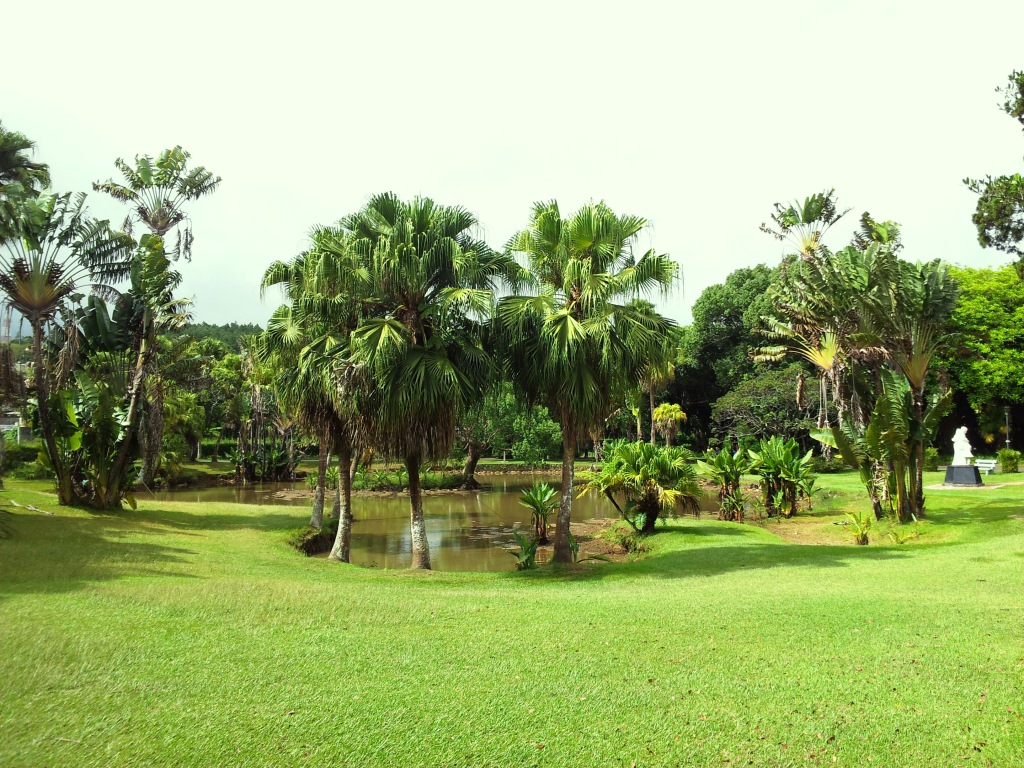
A section of the gardens' lake.

The gardens were established in 1870, with the initial goal of cultivating several varieties of plants that could not get acclimatized in the less temperate regions of the island (While still hot and tropical, Curepipe's climate is marginally cooler than that of the coastal territories of Mauritius).

The gardens were initially furnished with a rich collection of exotic plants which have been introduced to Mauritius as ornamentals, especially Rhododendrons, Camphors and a range of exotic fruit trees. Azaleas, on the coat of arms of Curepipe, also grace the garden. However it now also boasts a small but growing collection of the rarest and most endangered endemic plants of Mauritius.

In the mid-1980s, the garden was named "Sir Seewoosagar Botanical Garden" after Seewoosagur Ramgoolam, Mauritius's first post-independence prime minister. A similarly named botanical garden to the north in Pamplemousses (Sir Seewoosagur Ramgoolam Botanical Garden), is also named after the same statesman. However the Curepipe Gardens are significantly smaller and cooler in temperature, with a more informal layout.

== Layout ==
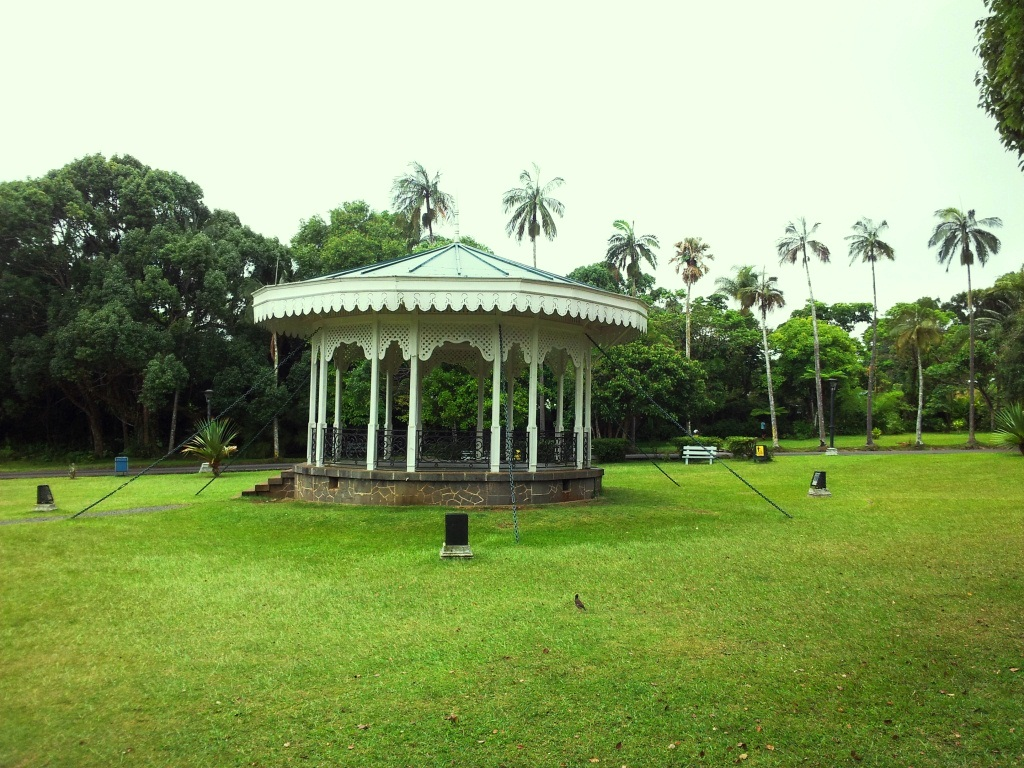
The gazebo, located on the gardens' front lawn, is occasionally used for events.

Entrance to the garden is free.

It covers an area of roughly 27 acres, and is situated about 2 km to the west of the Curepipe town centre in Route des Jardins. The main entrance is on Botanical Garden Street at Les Casernes, and a secondary entrance is located at Camp-Caval.

The gardens are intersected by a river and a lake – set about with Nandia palms. There is also a gazebo, at which community events are sometimes hosted. This Victorian-style kiosk has a raised wooden board floor, designed specifically for acoustics to cater for the audiences which attended the early concerts.

The offices of the Forestry Department, from which permission is needed to visit the Nature Reserves of the interior, is located next door to the gardens. In partnership with the Curepipe Municipal Council, it has worked at propagating some of the island nation's rarest native trees and shrubs. Some have been planted in the gardens, including a variety of indigenous "Vacoas" (Pandanus) species which have been established around the lake.

== The world's rarest palm ==
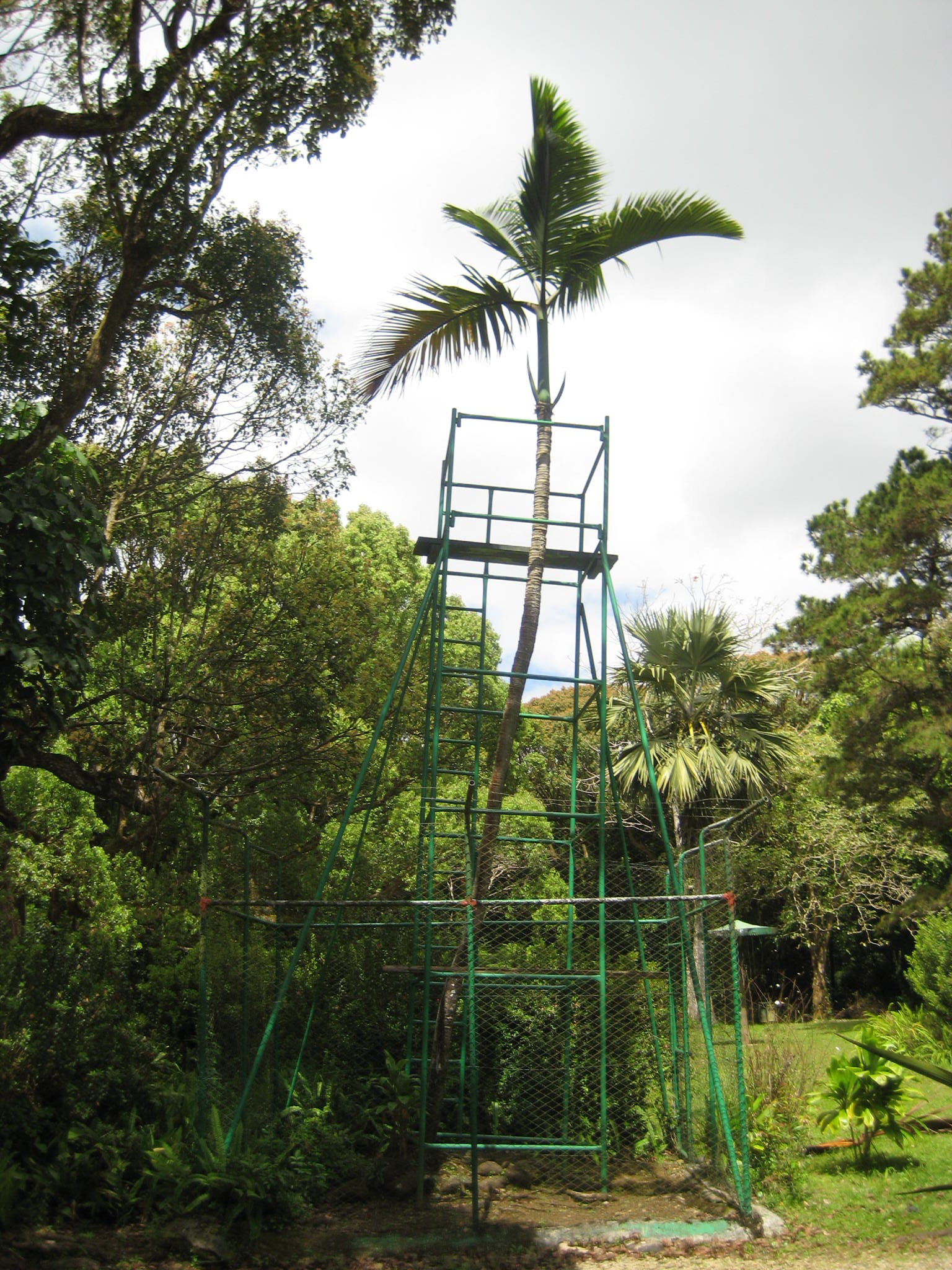
Hyophorbe amaricaulis, the rarest palm in the world. The only individual in existence is the specimen in Curepipe gardens.

Curepipe Gardens house the rarest palm tree in the world, the unique specimen of Hyophorbe amaricaulis. This individual remains the only specimen of its species, as all of the many attempts to cross-fertilise it have failed.

The unique palm is now surrounded by security fencing for its protection. It is about 12 meters high, with a thin gray trunk and occasional creamy white flowers.
