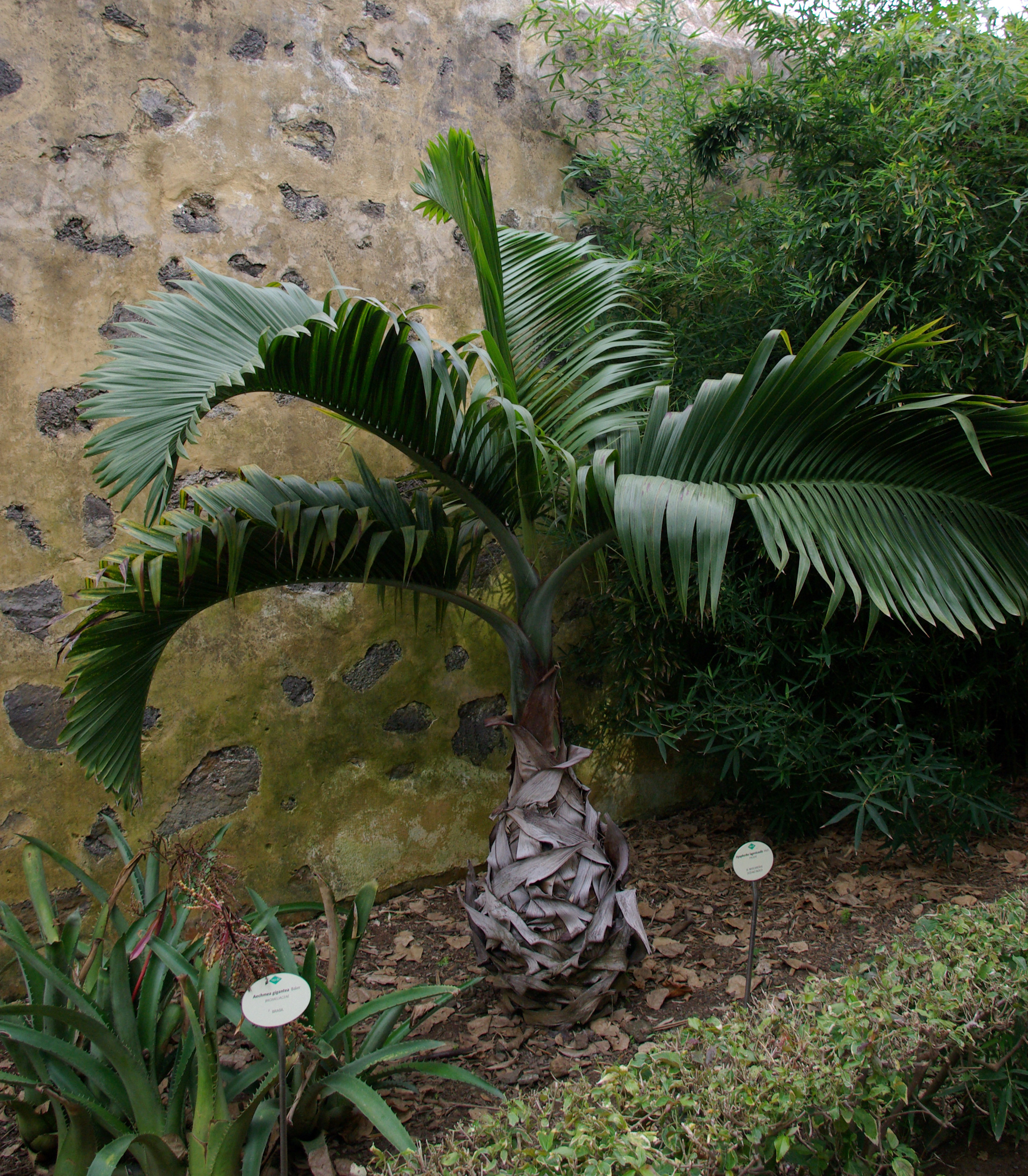

Conservation status
- Critically Endangered (IUCN 2.3)

Scientific classification
- Kingdom: Plantae
- Clade: Tracheophytes
- Clade: Angiosperms
- Clade: Monocots
- Clade: Commelinids
- Order: Arecales
- Family: Arecaceae
- Genus: Hyophorbe
- Species: H. lagenicaulis

Binomial name
- Hyophorbe lagenicaulis (L.H.Bailey) H.E.Moore

= Hyophorbe lagenicaulis =

Species of palm

Hyophorbe lagenicaulis, the bottle palm or palmiste gargoulette, is a species of flowering plant in the family Arecaceae. It is native to Round Island, Mauritius.

== Description ==
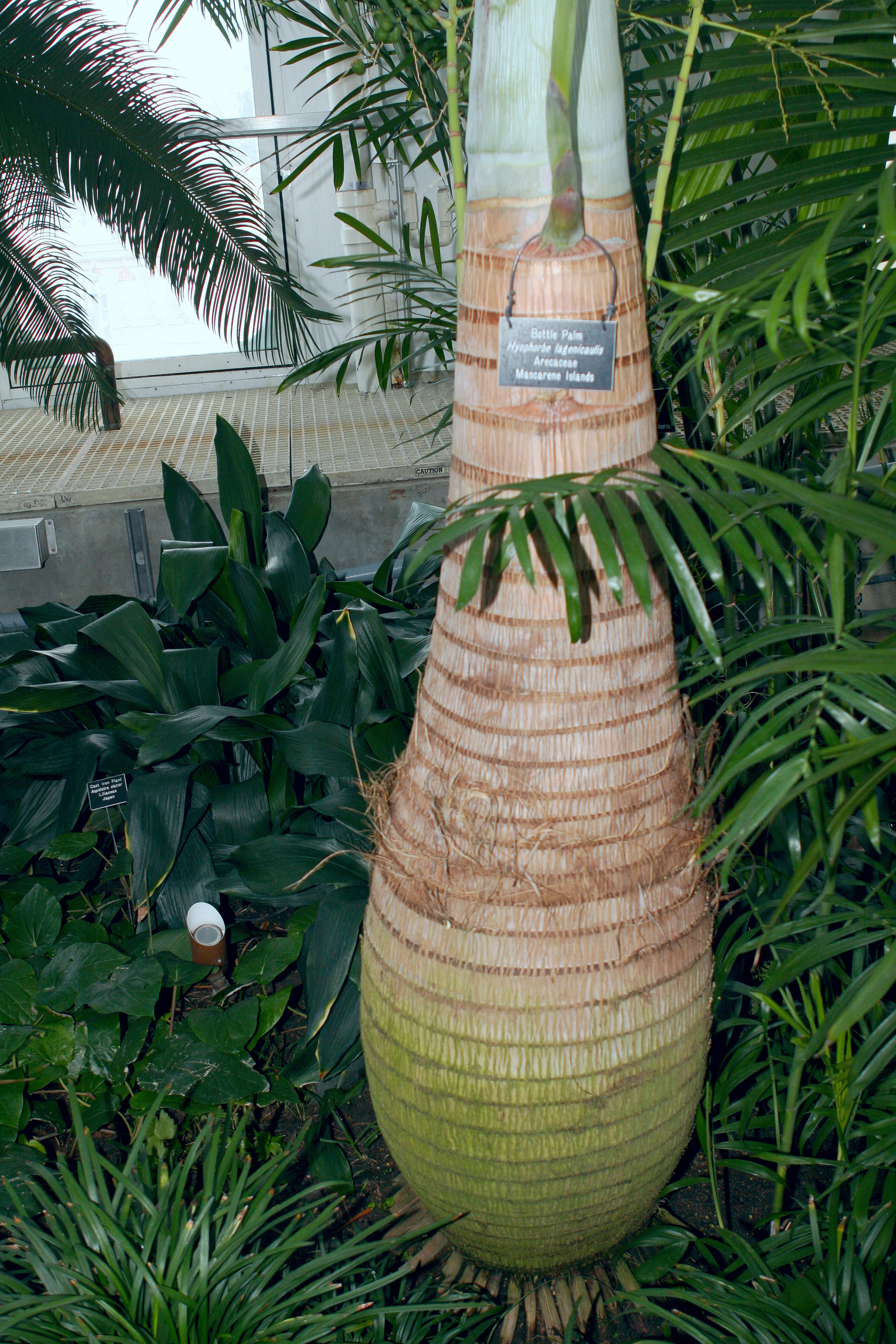
Hyophorbe lagenicaulis showing enlarged trunk and roots

Bottle palm has a large swollen (sometimes bizarrely so) trunk. It is a myth that the trunk is a means by which the palm stores water. Bottle palms have only four to six leaves open at any time. The leaves of young palms have a red or orange tint, but a deep green is assumed at maturity. The flowers of the palm arise from under the crownshaft.

This species is often confused with its relative, the Spindle Palm, which also has a swollen trunk. But the Spindle palm's trunk swells in the middle (resembling the shape of a spindle), whereas the trunk of the Bottle palm swells from near the base and tapers further up. Its inflorescence branches in 4 orders, and its 2.5 cm fruits can be orange or black. The trunk of both species becomes more and more slender as the palm ages.

On Mauritius, the only other extant Hyophorbe species is the exceedingly rare and critically endangered Hyophorbe vaughanii. The Bottle palm can be distinguished from this species by its swollen trunk when young; by its much smaller (2.5 cm) orange or black fruits; and by its inflorescence, which branches in four orders rather than three.

== Distribution and habitat ==
The bottle palm is naturally endemic to Round Island, off the coast of Mauritius. While habitat destruction may destroy the last remaining palms in the wild, the survival of the species is assured due to its ubiquitous planting throughout the tropics and subtropics as a specimen plant. It is one of three Hyophorbe species which naturally occur in Mauritius, and one of only two that are still extant.

== Cultivation ==
Bottle palms are very cold sensitive and are killed at 0 °C (32 °F) or colder for any appreciable length of time. They may survive a brief, light frost, but will have foliage damage. Only southern Florida and Hawaii provide safe locations in the US to grow Bottle Palm, although mature flowering specimens may be occasionally be seen in favored microclimates around Cape Canaveral and Tampa-St. Petersburg-Clearwater in coastal central Florida. It makes a fine container-grown palm in other locations as long as it is protected from the cold and not overwatered.

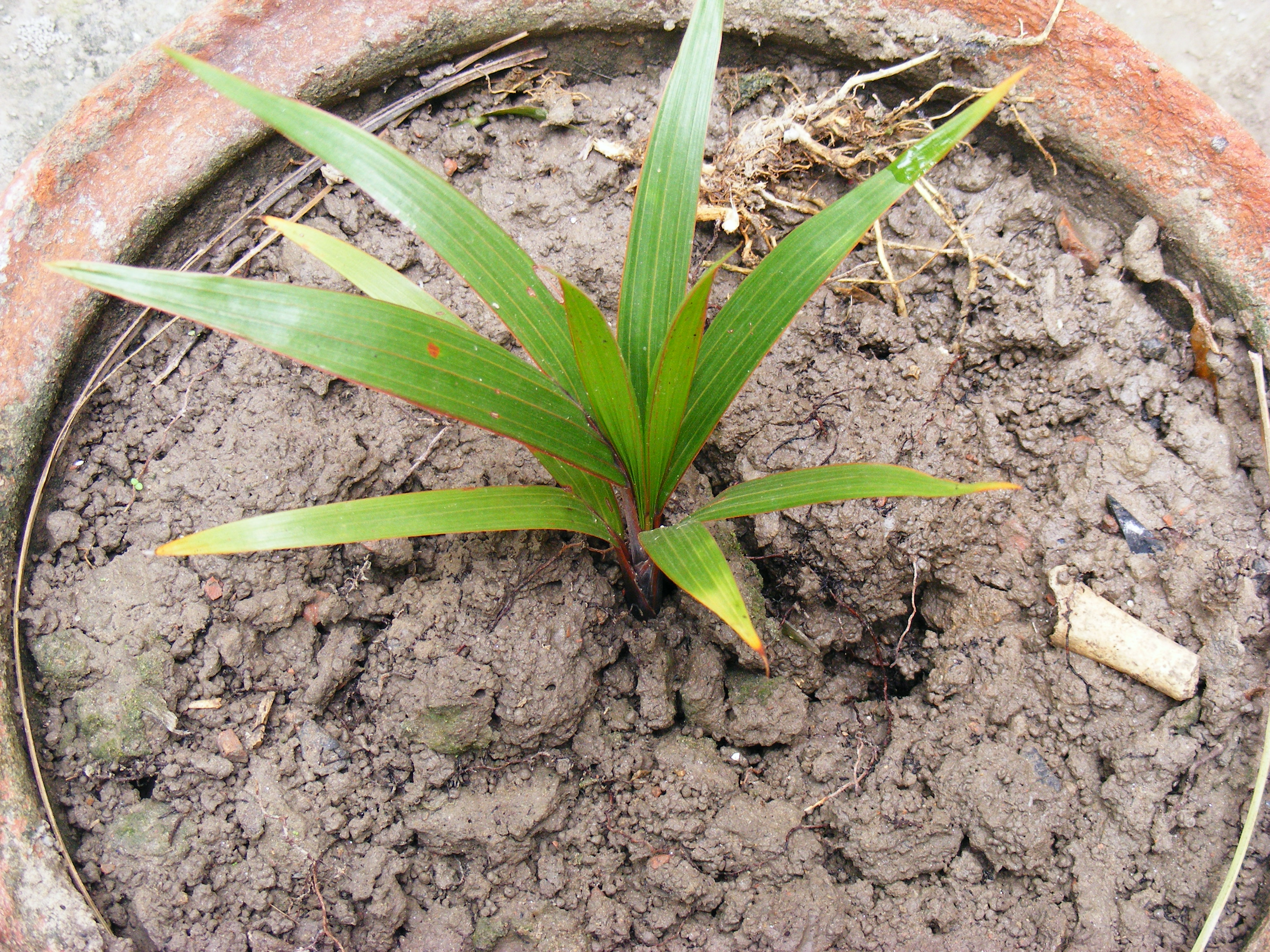
Seedling stage.

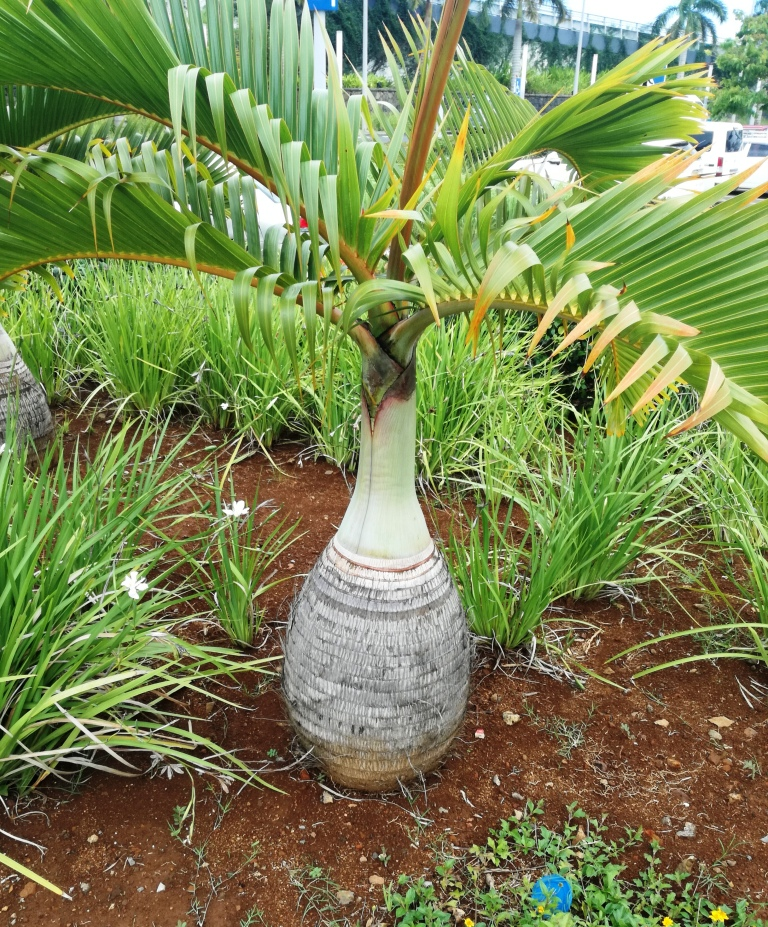
Young plant

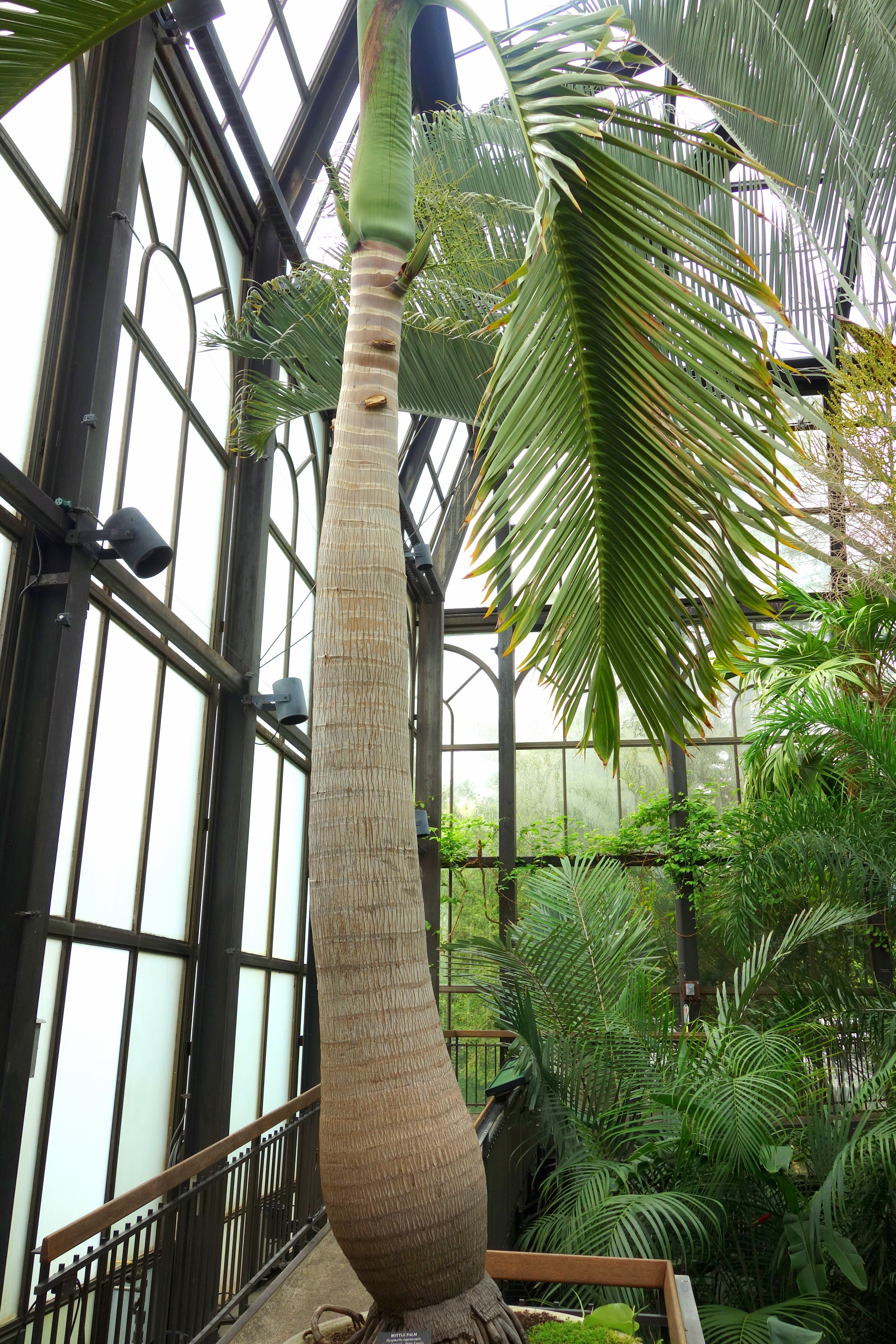
Adult stage

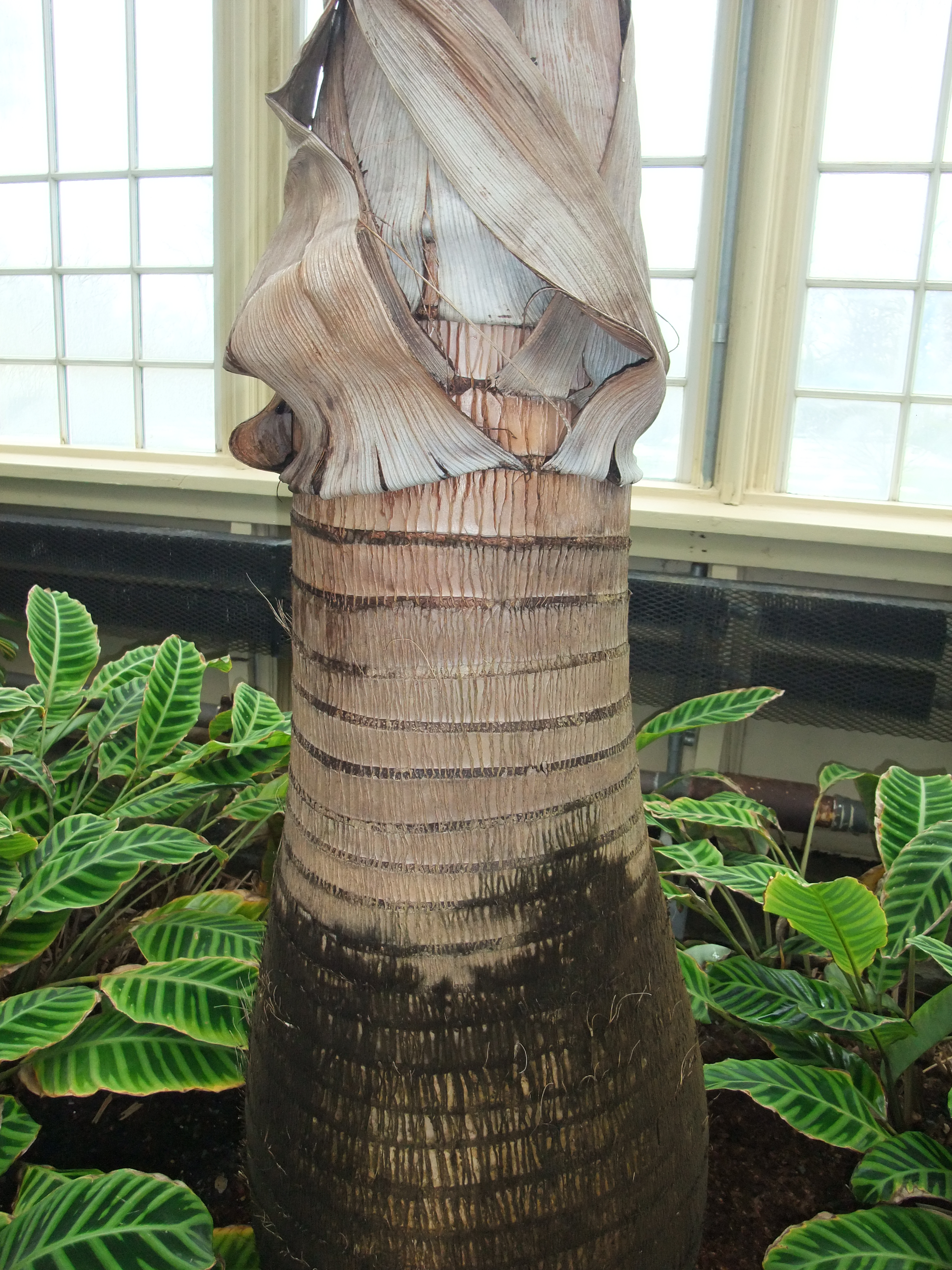
Close-up of trunk.

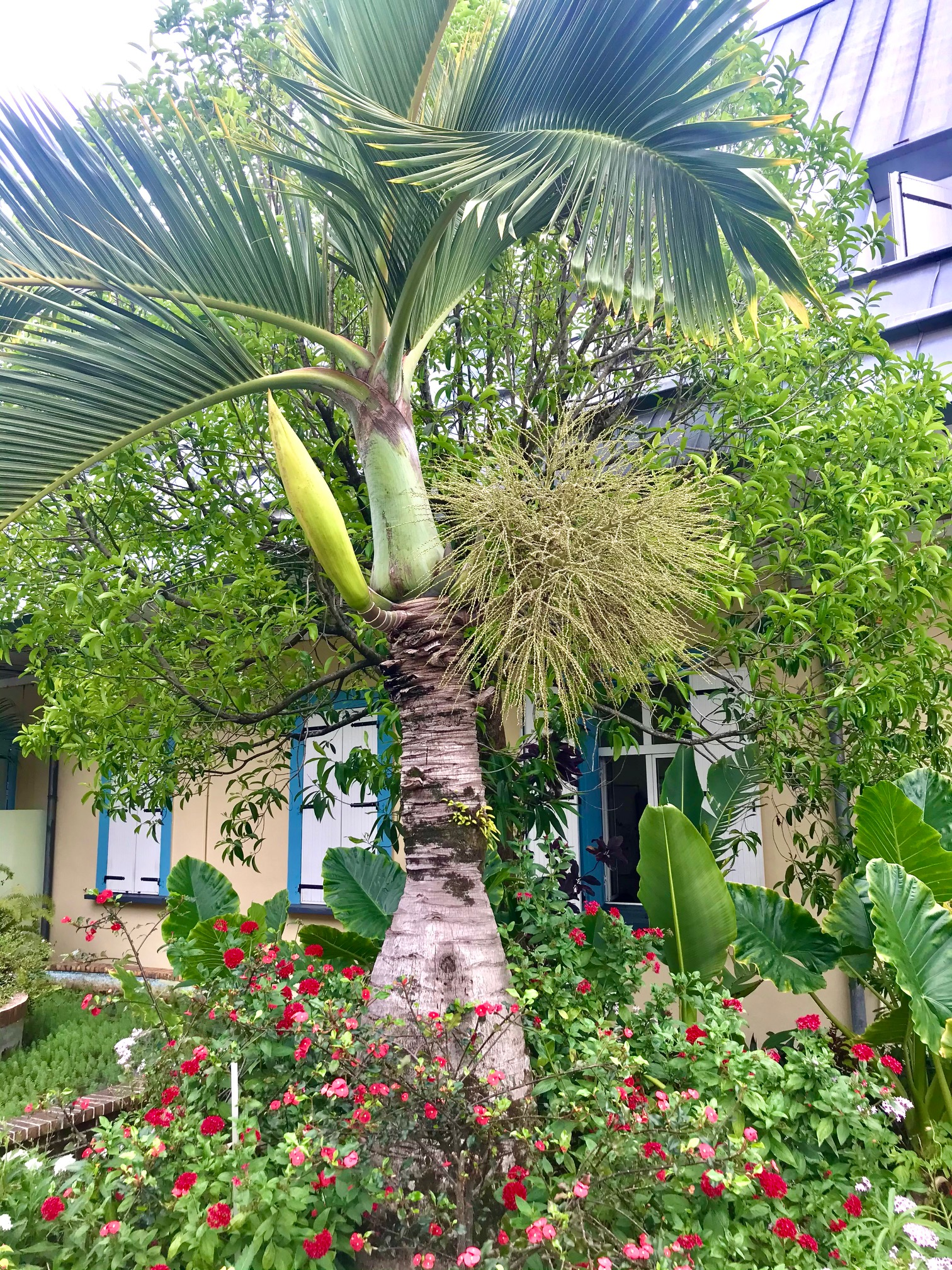
Rare specimen due to the weird trunk shape (Bras Panon, Reunion island), note the epiphyte growing on the trunk

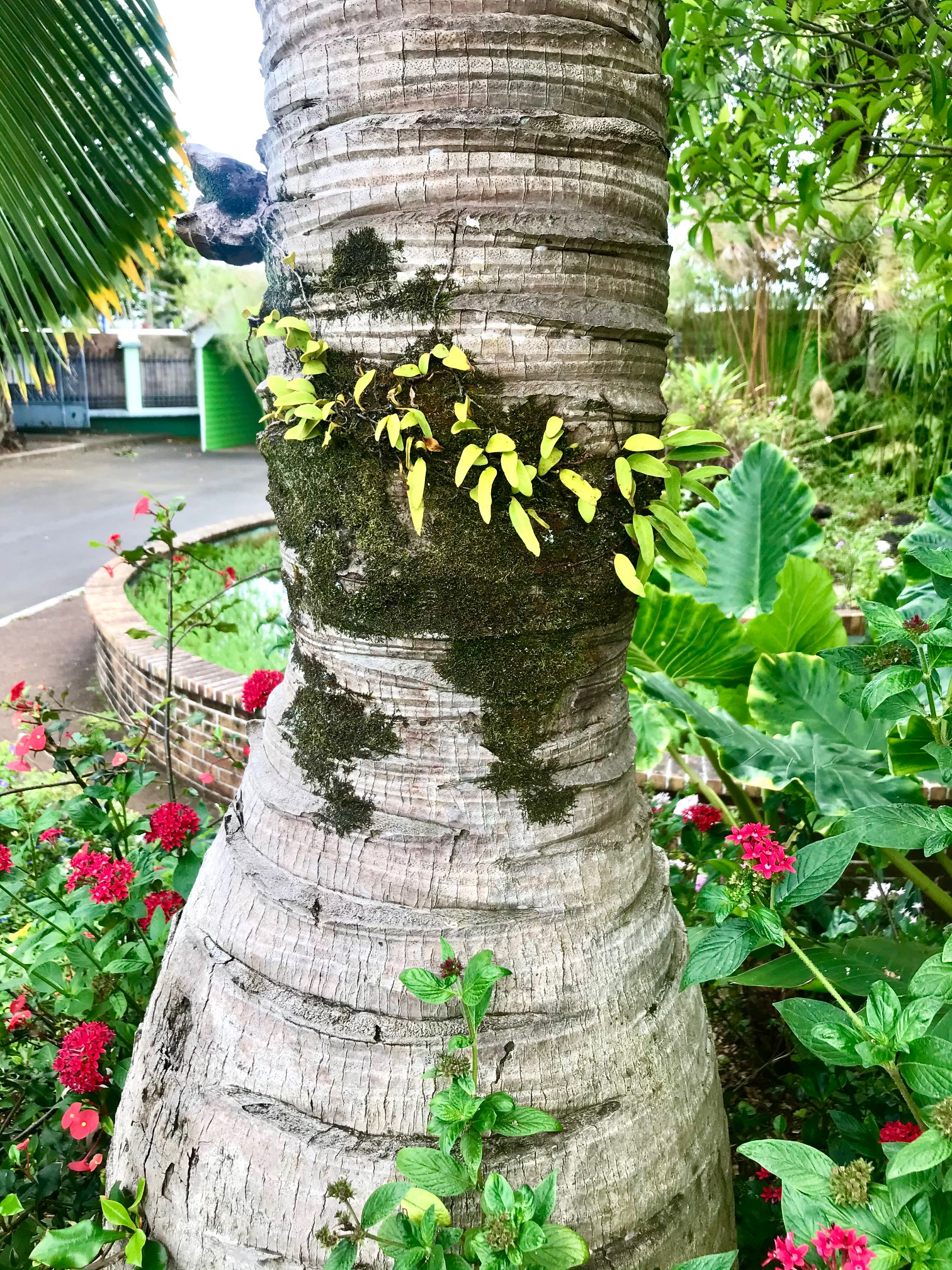
Close up of the same specimen (Reunion island)

== See also ==
- The Beaucarnea (ponytail palms et al.) are sometimes called bottle palms.
