= List of Diospyros species =

Diospyros is a genus of trees and shrubs with a cosmopolitan distribution.

As of July 2025, Plants of the World Online accepts 787 species and one hybrid, as follows:

== A ==
- Diospyros abyssinica (Hiern) F.White
- Diospyros acapulcensis Kunth
- Diospyros acocksii (De Winter) De Winter
- Diospyros acris Hemsl.
- Diospyros aculeata H.Perrier
- Diospyros acuminata (Thwaites) Kosterm.
- Diospyros acuta Thwaites
- Diospyros adenophora Bakh.
- Diospyros adiensis Kosterm.
- Diospyros adinandrifolia Y.M.Shui, Z.X.Zhang & C.Y.Zou
- Diospyros aequoris Standl.
- Diospyros affinis Thwaites
- Diospyros agnitser B.Walln.
- Diospyros aifatensis Kosterm.
- Diospyros alatella Kosterm.
- Diospyros albiflora Alston
- Diospyros alboflavescens (Gürke) F.White
- Diospyros alisu B.Walln.
- Diospyros alpina Kosterm.
- Diospyros amabi B.Walln.
- Diospyros amanap B.Walln.
- Diospyros amaniensis Gürke
- Diospyros ambanjensis G.E.Schatz & Lowry
- Diospyros amboinensis Bakh.
- Diospyros amborelloides G.E.Schatz & Lowry
- Diospyros analalavensis Lowry, G.E.Schatz, Linan & H.N.Rakouth
- Diospyros analamerensis H.Perrier
- Diospyros andamanica (Kurz) Bakh.
- Diospyros andohahelensis G.E.Schatz & Lowry
- † Diospyros angulata Poir.
- Diospyros anisandra S.F.Blake
- Diospyros anisocalyx C.Y.Wu
- Diospyros anitae F.White
- Diospyros anosivolensis H.Perrier
- Diospyros antakaranae Capuron ex G.E.Schatz & Lowry
- Diospyros antongilensis G.E.Schatz & Lowry
- Diospyros antsirananae G.E.Schatz & Lowry
- Diospyros apeibocarpos Raddi
- Diospyros apiculata Hiern
- Diospyros arenicola Linan, G.E.Schatz & Lowry
- Diospyros areolata King & Gamble
- Diospyros areolifolia Kosterm.
- Diospyros argentea Griff.
- Diospyros armata Hemsl.
- Diospyros artanthifolia Mart. ex Miq.
- Diospyros arupaj B.Walln.
- Diospyros atrata (Thwaites) Alston
- Diospyros attenuata Thwaites
- Diospyros aurea Teijsm. & Binn.
- Diospyros australis (R.Br.) F.M.Bailey

== B ==
- Diospyros balansae Guillaumin
- Diospyros balfouriana Diels
- Diospyros baloen-idjoek Bakh.
- Diospyros bambuseti H.R.Fletcher
- Diospyros bangkana Bakh.
- Diospyros bangoiensis Lecomte
- Diospyros baranensis Lecomte
- Diospyros barberi Ramaswami
- Diospyros bardotiae H.N.Rakouth, G.E.Schatz & Lowry
- Diospyros baroniana H.Perrier
- Diospyros baronii (H.Perrier) H.N.Rakouth & Lowry
- Diospyros barteri Hiern
- Diospyros batocana Hiern
- Diospyros beankensis Linan, G.E.Schatz & Lowry
- Diospyros beberonnii G.E.Schatz & Lowry
- Diospyros beccarioides Ng
- Diospyros bejaudii Lecomte
- Diospyros bemarivensis H.Perrier
- Diospyros benghalensis Bakh.
- Diospyros benstonei Kosterm.
- Diospyros bernieriana (Baill.) H.Perrier
- Diospyros betamponensis G.E.Schatz & Lowry
- Diospyros bezofensis H.Perrier
- Diospyros bibracteata Bakh.
- Diospyros bipindensis Gürke
- Diospyros blancoi A.DC.
- Diospyros blepharophylla Standl.
- Diospyros blumutensis Ng
- Diospyros boala De Wild.
- Diospyros boinensis (H.Perrier) G.E.Schatz & Lowry
- Diospyros boiviniana (Baill.) G.E.Schatz & Lowry
- Diospyros boivinii Hiern
- Diospyros bonii Lecomte
- Diospyros borbonica I.Richardson
- Diospyros borneensis Hiern
- Diospyros bourdillonii Brandis
- Diospyros boutoniana A.DC.
- Diospyros brainii Ng
- Diospyros brandisiana Kurz
- Diospyros brasiliensis Mart. ex Miq.
- Diospyros brassica F.White
- Diospyros brevicalyx Boerl. & Koord.-Schum.
- Diospyros brideliifolia Elmer
- Diospyros britannoborneensis Bakh.
- Diospyros bullata A.C.Sm.
- Diospyros bumelioides Standl.
- Diospyros burmanica Kurz
- Diospyros bussei Gürke
- Diospyros buxifolia (Blume) Hiern

== C ==
- Diospyros cacharensis (Das & P.C.Kanjilal) H.B.Naithani
- Diospyros cachimboensis Pires & Cavalcante
- Diospyros calcicola Merr.
- Diospyros calciphila F.White
- Diospyros californica (Brandegee) I.M.Johnst.
- Diospyros callmanderi G.E.Schatz & Lowry
- Diospyros caloneura C.Y.Wu
- Diospyros calophylla Hiern
- Diospyros calycantha O.Schwarz
- Diospyros cambodiana Lecomte
- Diospyros campanulata Bakh.
- Diospyros canaliculata De Wild.
- Diospyros candolleana Wight
- Diospyros capreifolia Mart. ex Hiern
- Diospyros capricornuta F.White
- Diospyros carbonaria Benoist
- Diospyros caribaea (A.DC.) Standl.
- Diospyros castanea (Craib) H.R.Fletcher
- Diospyros cathayensis Steward
- Diospyros caudisepala Bakh.
- Diospyros cauliflora Blume
- Diospyros cauligera F.White
- Diospyros cavalcantei Sothers
- Diospyros cayennensis A.DC.
- Diospyros celebica Bakh.
- Diospyros chaetocarpa Kosterm.
- Diospyros chamaethamnus Mildbr.
- Diospyros chartacea Wall. ex A.DC.
- Diospyros cherrieri F.White
- Diospyros chevalieri De Wild.
- Diospyros chitoniophora Capuron ex Linan, G.E.Schatz & Lowry
- Diospyros chloroxylon Roxb.
- Diospyros choboensis Lecomte
- Diospyros chrysocarpa F.White
- Diospyros chrysophyllos Poir.
- Diospyros chunii F.P.Metcalf & H.Y.Chen
- Diospyros cinnabarina (Gürke) F.White
- Diospyros cinnamomoides H.Perrier
- Diospyros clavigera C.B.Clarke
- Diospyros cleistantha O.Lachenaud & G.E.Schatz
- Diospyros clementium Bakh.
- Diospyros clusiifolia (Hiern) G.E.Schatz & Lowry
- Diospyros coaetanea H.R.Fletcher
- Diospyros coccolobifolia Mart. ex Miq.
- Diospyros collinsiae Craib
- Diospyros comorensis Hiern
- Diospyros compacta (R.Br.) Kosterm.
- Diospyros confertiflora (Hiern) Bakh.
- Diospyros conformis Bakh.
- Diospyros conocarpa Gürke
- Diospyros consanguinea Merr.
- Diospyros consolatae Chiov.
- Diospyros conzattii Standl.
- Diospyros cooperi (Hutch. & Dalziel) F.White
- Diospyros corallina Chun & H.Y.Chen
- Diospyros cordata (Hiern) Bakh.
- Diospyros cordato-oblonga Kosterm.
- Diospyros coriacea Hiern
- Diospyros courrierensis Linan, G.E.Schatz & Lowry
- Diospyros coursiana H.Perrier
- Diospyros crassiflora Hiern
- Diospyros crassifolia Linan, G.E.Schatz & Lowry
- Diospyros crassinervis (Krug & Urb.) Standl.
- Diospyros crassipedicellata G.E.Schatz & Lowry
- Diospyros crebripilis Kosterm.
- Diospyros crockerensis Ng
- Diospyros crumenata Thwaites
- Diospyros cupulifera H.Perrier
- Diospyros curranii Merr.

== D-F ==
- Diospyros daemona Bakh.
- Diospyros dalyom B.Walln.
- Diospyros danguyana H.Perrier
- Diospyros danxiaensis (R.H.Miao & W.Q.Liu) Y.H.Tong & N.H.Xia
- Diospyros darainensis G.E.Schatz & Lowry
- Diospyros dasyphylla Kurz
- Diospyros daweishanensis Z.X.Zhang, Gui L.Zhang & C.Y.Zou
- Diospyros decandra Lour.
- Diospyros decaryana H.Perrier
- Diospyros decaryoides G.E.Schatz & Lowry
- Diospyros defectrix H.R.Fletcher
- Diospyros dendo Welw. ex Hiern
- Diospyros densiflora Wall. ex G.Don
- Diospyros dichroa Sandwith
- Diospyros dichrophylla (Gand.) De Winter
- Diospyros dicorypheoides H.Perrier
- Diospyros dictyoneura Hiern
- Diospyros diepenhorstii Miq.
- Diospyros dinhensis T.H.Nguyên
- Diospyros discocalyx Merr.
- Diospyros diversifolia Hiern
- Diospyros diversilimba Merr. & Chun
- Diospyros dodecandra Lour.
- Diospyros dolmen B.Walln.
- Diospyros domarkind B.Walln.
- Diospyros domingensis (Urb.) Alain
- Diospyros dumetorum W.W.Sm.
- Diospyros dussaudii Lecomte
- Diospyros ebenifera (H.Perrier) G.E.Schatz & Lowry
- Diospyros ebenum J.Koenig
- Diospyros eburnea Bakh.
- Diospyros egbert-walkeri Kosterm.
- Diospyros egleri Pires & Cavalcante
- Diospyros egrettarum I.Richardson
- Diospyros ehretioides Wall. ex G.Don
- Diospyros ekodul B.Walln.
- Diospyros elegans C.B.Clarke
- Diospyros elephasii Lecomte
- Diospyros elliotii (Hiern) F.White
- Diospyros ellipsoidea King & Gamble
- Diospyros elliptifolia Merr.
- Diospyros eriantha Champ. ex Benth.
- Diospyros erinacea (H.Perrier) G.E.Schatz & Lowry
- Diospyros erythrosperma H.Perrier
- Diospyros esmereg B.Walln.
- Diospyros eucalyptifolia Bakh.
- Diospyros euphlehia Merr.
- Diospyros evena Bakh.
- Diospyros everettii Merr.
- Diospyros exculpta Buch.-Ham.
- Diospyros falyi G.E.Schatz & Lowry
- Diospyros fanjingshanica S.K.Lee
- Diospyros farankarainensis Linan, H.N.Rakouth & Lowry
- Diospyros fasciculosa (F.Muell.) F.Muell.
- Diospyros fasimainty G.E.Schatz & Lowry
- Diospyros feliciana Letouzey & F.White
- Diospyros fenal B.Walln.
- Diospyros fengchangensis S.Y.Lu
- Diospyros fengii C.Y.Wu
- Diospyros ferox Bakh.
- Diospyros ferrea (Willd.) Bakh.
- Diospyros ferruginescens Bakh.
- Diospyros filipendula Pierre ex Lecomte
- Diospyros filipes H.Perrier
- Diospyros fischeri Gürke
- Diospyros flavocarpa (Vieill. ex P.Parm.) F.White
- Diospyros fleuryana A.Chev. ex Lecomte
- Diospyros foliolosa Wall. ex A.DC.
- Diospyros foliosa (Rich. ex A.Gray) Bakh.
- Diospyros forbesii Bakh.
- Diospyros forrestii J.Anthony
- Diospyros foxworthyi Bakh.
- Diospyros fragrans Gürke
- Diospyros froesii Cavalcante
- Diospyros frutescens Blume
- Diospyros fulvopilosa H.R.Fletcher
- Diospyros fuscovelutina Baker
- Diospyros fusicarpa Bakh.
- Diospyros fusiformis Kosterm.

== G-H ==
- Diospyros gabunensis Gürke
- Diospyros gallo B.Walln.
- Diospyros galpinii (Hiern) De Winter
- Diospyros gambleana Bakh.
- Diospyros gaultheriifolia Mart. ex Miq.
- Diospyros geayana (H.Perrier) G.E.Schatz & Lowry
- Diospyros geminata (R.Br.) F.Muell.
- Diospyros ghatensis B.R.Ramesh & D.De Franceschi
- Diospyros gigantocarpa Kosterm.
- Diospyros gillespiei (Fosberg) Kosterm.
- Diospyros gilletii De Wild.
- Diospyros gillisonii Kosterm.
- Diospyros glabra (L.) De Winter
- Diospyros glabrata (Warb.) Kosterm.
- Diospyros glandulifera De Winter
- Diospyros glandulosa Lace
- Diospyros glans F.White
- Diospyros glaucophylla Bakh.
- Diospyros glomerata Spruce ex Hiern
- Diospyros goudotii Hiern
- Diospyros gracilescens Gürke
- Diospyros graciliflora Hiern
- Diospyros gracilipes Hiern
- Diospyros gracilis H.R.Fletcher
- Diospyros grandiflora G.E.Schatz & Lowry
- Diospyros granitica Jessup
- Diospyros greenwayi F.White
- Diospyros greshoffiana Koord. ex Bakh.
- Diospyros greveana H.Perrier
- Diospyros grex F.White
- Diospyros grisebachii (Hiern) Standl.
- Diospyros guatterioides A.C.Sm.
- Diospyros guianensis (Aubl.) Gürke
- Diospyros hackenbergii Diels
- Diospyros hainanensis Merr.
- Diospyros haivanensis T.H.Nguyên
- Diospyros halesioides Griseb.
- Diospyros hallieri Bakh.
- Diospyros haplostylis Boivin ex Hiern
- Diospyros hasseltii Zoll.
- Diospyros hassleri Hiern
- Diospyros havilandii Bakh.
- Diospyros hayatae Lecomte
- Diospyros hazomainty H.Perrier
- Diospyros hebecarpa A.Cunn. ex Benth.
- Diospyros heishi Govaerts
- Diospyros hemicycloides (F.Muell. ex Benth.) Jessup
- Diospyros hemiteles I.Richardson
- Diospyros hequetiae G.E.Schatz, Lowry & Fleurot
- Diospyros heterosepala H.Perrier
- Diospyros heterotricha (Welw. ex Hiern) F.White
- Diospyros heudelotii Hiern
- Diospyros hexamera C.Y.Wu
- Diospyros hillebrandii (Seem.) Fosberg
- Diospyros hirsuta L.f.
- Diospyros holeana B.L.Gupta & P.C.Kanjilal
- Diospyros holttumii Bakh.
- Diospyros hongwae G.E.Schatz, Lowry & Phillipson
- Diospyros howii Merr. & Chun
- Diospyros hoyleana F.White
- Diospyros humbertiana H.Perrier
- Diospyros humilis (R.Br.) F.Muell.

== I-L ==
- Diospyros impia B.Walln.
- Diospyros implexicalyx H.Perrier
- Diospyros impolita F.White
- Diospyros impressa Dunn & R.S.Williams
- Diospyros inconstans Jacq.
- Diospyros inflata Merr. & Chun
- Diospyros inhacaensis F.White
- Diospyros insidiosa Bakh.
- Diospyros insignis Thwaites
- Diospyros insularis Bakh.
- Diospyros intricata (A.Gray) Standl.
- Diospyros iturensis (Gürke) Letouzey & F.White
- Diospyros janowskyi Bakh.
- Diospyros japonica Siebold & Zucc.
- Diospyros javanica Bakh.
- Diospyros johnstoniana Standl. & Steyerm.
- Diospyros johorensis Ng
- Diospyros juruensis A.C.Sm.
- Diospyros kabuyeana F.White
- Diospyros kaki Thunb.
- Diospyros kamerunensis Gürke
- Diospyros kanizur B.Walln.
- Diospyros kanurii F.White
- Diospyros katendei Verdc.
- Diospyros kely G.E.Schatz & Lowry
- Diospyros keningauensis Ng
- Diospyros kerrii Craib
- Diospyros ketsensis H.Perrier
- Diospyros ketun B.Walln.
- Diospyros kika Debb. & Biswas
- Diospyros kingii Bakh.
- Diospyros kintungensis C.Y.Wu
- Diospyros kirkii Hiern
- Diospyros koeboeensis Bakh.
- Diospyros koenigii Kosterm.
- Diospyros kolom B.Walln.
- Diospyros kondor B.Walln.
- Diospyros korthalsiana Hiern
- Diospyros korupensis Gosline
- Diospyros kostermansii V.Singh
- Diospyros kotoensis T.Yamaz.
- Diospyros krukovii A.C.Sm.
- Diospyros kupensis Gosline
- Diospyros kurzii Hiern
- Diospyros labillardierei F.White
- Diospyros lanceifolia Roxb.
- Diospyros lanceolata Poir.
- Diospyros landii Cavalcante
- Diospyros laoensis Tagane & Soulad.
- Diospyros lasiocalyx (Mart.) B.Walln.
- Diospyros lateralis Hiern
- Diospyros latisepala Ridl.
- Diospyros latispathulata H.Perrier
- Diospyros laurina (R.Br.) Jessup
- Diospyros leei Yan Liu, Song Shi & Y.S.Huang
- Diospyros × leonis (Britton & P.Wilson) Standl.
- Diospyros leucocalyx Hiern
- Diospyros leucomelas Poir.
- Diospyros liberiensis A.Chev. ex Hutch. & Dalziel
- Diospyros linanii Rasingam & Karthig.
- Diospyros lissocarpoides Sandwith
- Diospyros littoralis Capuron ex G.E.Schatz & Lowry
- Diospyros littorea (R.Br.) Kosterm.
- Diospyros lobata Lour.
- Diospyros lokohensis (H.Perrier) G.E.Schatz & Lowry
- Diospyros lolin Bakh.
- Diospyros lolinopsis Kosterm.
- Diospyros longibracteata Lecomte
- Diospyros longiciliata Merr.
- Diospyros longiflora Letouzey & F.White
- Diospyros longipedicellata Lecomte
- Diospyros longipilosa Phengklai
- Diospyros longistyla A.C.Sm.
- Diospyros longshengensis S.K.Lee
- Diospyros lotus L.
- Diospyros loureiroana G.Don
- Diospyros louvelii H.Perrier
- Diospyros lowryi G.E.Schatz
- Diospyros lunduensis Ng
- Diospyros lycioides Desf.

== M ==
- Diospyros mabacea (F.Muell.) F.Muell.
- Diospyros maclurei Merr.
- Diospyros macrocarpa Hiern
- Diospyros maculata G.E.Schatz & Lowry
- Diospyros madagascariensis (A.DC.) E.Mestre & H.N.Rakouth
- Diospyros madecassa H.Perrier
- Diospyros mafiensis F.White
- Diospyros magogoana F.White
- Diospyros maingayi (Hiern) Bakh.
- Diospyros major (G.Forst.) Bakh.
- Diospyros malabarica (Desr.) Kostel.
- Diospyros malacothrix Kosterm.
- Diospyros malandy H.N.Rakouth, Randrianaivo, G.E.Schatz & Lowry
- Diospyros manampetsae H.Perrier
- Diospyros manausensis Cavalcante
- Diospyros mandenensis H.N.Rakouth, G.E.Schatz & Lowry
- Diospyros mangabensis Aug.DC.
- Diospyros mangorensis H.Perrier
- Diospyros mannii Hiern
- Diospyros manongarivensis Linan, G.E.Schatz & Lowry
- Diospyros manu B.Walln.
- Diospyros mapingo H.Perrier
- Diospyros margaretae F.White
- Diospyros maritima Blume
- Diospyros marmorata R.Parker
- Diospyros martabanica C.B.Clarke
- Diospyros martini Benoist
- Diospyros masoalensis H.Perrier
- Diospyros matheriana A.C.Sm.
- Diospyros mcphersonii G.E.Schatz & Lowry
- Diospyros meeusiana (H.Perrier) G.E.Schatz & Lowry
- Diospyros melanida Poir.
- Diospyros melanocarpa G.E.Schatz & Lowry
- Diospyros melanoxylon Roxb.
- Diospyros melocarpa F.White
- Diospyros mespiliformis Hochst. ex A.DC.
- Diospyros metcalfii Chun & H.Y.Chen
- Diospyros mexiae Standl.
- Diospyros miaoshanica S.K.Lee
- Diospyros micrantha Sandwith
- Diospyros microrhombus Hiern
- Diospyros miltonii Cavalcante
- Diospyros mimusops G.E.Schatz & Lowry
- Diospyros minahassae Bakh.
- Diospyros mindanaensis Merr.
- Diospyros minimifolia F.White
- Diospyros minutiflora Bakh.
- Diospyros minutiloba H.Perrier
- Diospyros minutisepala Kottaim.
- Diospyros miroma B.Walln.
- Diospyros moi Lecomte
- Diospyros mollis Griff.
- Diospyros mollissima Kosterm.
- Diospyros monbuttensis Gürke
- Diospyros montana Roxb.
- Diospyros montisgallicarum Linan, G.E.Schatz & Lowry
- Diospyros moonii Thwaites
- Diospyros morrisiana Hance ex Walp.
- Diospyros mucronata Lowry, G.E.Schatz, Linan & H.N.Rakouth
- Diospyros multibracteata (Merr.) Bakh.
- Diospyros multiflora Blanco
- Diospyros multimaculata C.Puglisi
- Diospyros mun A.Chev. ex Lecomte
- Diospyros muricata Bakh.
- Diospyros mweroensis F.White
- Diospyros myriophylla (H.Perrier) G.E.Schatz & Lowry
- Diospyros myrmecocarpa Mart. ex Miq.
- Diospyros myrtifolia H.Perrier
- Diospyros myrtilloides (H.Perrier) G.E.Schatz & Lowry

== N-O ==
- Diospyros nanay B.Walln.
- Diospyros natalensis (Harv.) Brenan
- Diospyros nebulorum Lecomte
- Diospyros neilgerrensis (Wight) Kosterm.
- Diospyros nemorosa Bakh.
- Diospyros neraudii A.DC.
- Diospyros neurosepala Bakh.
- Diospyros ngii I.M.Turner
- Diospyros nhatrangensis Lecomte
- Diospyros nidiformis G.E.Schatz & Lowry
- Diospyros nigra (J.F.Gmel.) Perr.
- Diospyros nigrocortex C.Y.Wu
- Diospyros nilagirica Bedd.
- Diospyros nitidifolia Linan, G.E.Schatz & Lowry
- Diospyros nodosa Poir.
- Diospyros normanbyensis Kosterm.
- Diospyros novoguineensis Bakh.
- Diospyros nummulariifolia Kosterm.
- Diospyros nur B.Walln.
- Diospyros nutans King & Gamble
- Diospyros oaxacana Standl.
- Diospyros obducta (H.Perrier) G.E.Schatz & Lowry
- Diospyros obliquifolia (Hiern ex Gürke) F.White
- Diospyros oblonga Wall. ex G.Don
- Diospyros obscurinerva Linan, G.E.Schatz & Lowry
- Diospyros occlusa H.Perrier
- Diospyros occulta F.White
- Diospyros okkesii Kosterm.
- Diospyros olacinoides (H.Perrier) G.E.Schatz & Lowry
- Diospyros oldhamii Maxim.
- Diospyros oleifera W.C.Cheng
- Diospyros oligantha Merr.
- Diospyros olivieri Linan, G.E.Schatz & Lowry
- Diospyros oliviformis R.H.Miao
- Diospyros onanae Gosline
- Diospyros oocarpa Thwaites
- Diospyros opaca C.B.Clarke
- Diospyros oppositifolia Thwaites
- Diospyros orbicularis G.E.Schatz & Lowry
- Diospyros orthioneura Diels
- Diospyros ottohuberi B.Walln.
- Diospyros oubatchensis Kosterm.
- Diospyros ovalifolia Wight
- Diospyros ovalis Hiern

== P ==
- Diospyros palauensis (Kaneh.) Hosok.
- Diospyros pallens (Thunb.) F.White
- Diospyros palmeri Eastw.
- Diospyros pancheri Kosterm.
- Diospyros panguana B.Walln.
- Diospyros paniculata Dalzell
- Diospyros papuana Valeton ex Bakh.
- Diospyros parabuxifolia Ng
- Diospyros paraensis Sothers
- Diospyros parifolia H.Perrier
- Diospyros parviflora (Schltr.) Bakh.
- Diospyros parvifolia Hiern
- Diospyros pascalii Linan, G.E.Schatz & Lowry
- Diospyros pauciflora King & Gamble
- Diospyros peekelii Lauterb.
- Diospyros pegophila I.M.Turner
- Diospyros pemadasae Jayas.
- Diospyros penangiana King & Gamble
- Diospyros pendula Hasselt ex Hassk.
- Diospyros penibukanensis Bakh.
- Diospyros peninsularis Jessup
- Diospyros pentamera (Woolls & F.Muell.) F.Muell.
- Diospyros peregrina (Gaertn.) Gürke
- Diospyros perfida Bakh.
- Diospyros perglauca H.Perrier
- Diospyros perplexa F.White
- Diospyros perreticulata H.Perrier
- Diospyros perrieri Jum.
- Diospyros pervilleana (Baill.) G.E.Schatz & Lowry
- Diospyros pervillei Hiern
- Diospyros phanrangensis Lecomte
- Diospyros phengklaii Duangjai, Sinbumr. & Suddee
- Diospyros philippinensis A.DC.
- Diospyros phillipsonii G.E.Schatz & Lowry
- Diospyros phlebodes (A.C.Sm.) A.C.Sm.
- Diospyros phuketensis Phengklai
- Diospyros phuwuaensis Duangjai, Rueangr. & Suddee
- Diospyros physocalycina Gürke
- Diospyros pierrei Lecomte
- Diospyros pilosiuscula G.Don
- Diospyros piresii Cavalcante
- Diospyros piscatoria Gürke
- Diospyros piscicapa Ridl.
- Diospyros platanoides Letouzey & F.White
- Diospyros platycalyx Hiern
- Diospyros plectosepala Hiern
- Diospyros plicaticalyx Linan, G.E.Schatz & Lowry
- Diospyros pluviatilis Jessup
- Diospyros poeppigiana A.DC.
- Diospyros polita Bakh.
- Diospyros polystemon Gürke
- Diospyros poncei Merr.
- Diospyros potamica Kosterm.
- Diospyros potingensis Merr. & Chun
- Diospyros preussii Gürke
- Diospyros pruinosa Hiern
- Diospyros pruriens Dalzell
- Diospyros pseudoharmandii T.H.Nguyên
- Diospyros pseudolanceolata G.E.Schatz & Lowry
- Diospyros pseudomespilus Mildbr.
- Diospyros pseudoxylopia Mildbr.
- Diospyros pterocalyx Bojer ex A.DC.
- Diospyros pubescens Pers.
- Diospyros pubiramulis Linan, G.E.Schatz & Lowry
- Diospyros pulchra Bakh.
- Diospyros puncticulosa Bakh.
- Diospyros punctilimba C.Y.Wu
- Diospyros pustulata F.White
- Diospyros pyrrhocarpa Miq.

== Q-R ==
- Diospyros quadrangularis G.E.Schatz & Lowry
- Diospyros quaesita Thwaites
- Diospyros quercina (Baill.) G.E.Schatz & Lowry
- Diospyros quiloensis (Hiern) F.White
- Diospyros rabehevitrae G.E.Schatz & Lowry
- Diospyros rabiensis Breteler
- Diospyros rakotovaoi G.E.Schatz & Lowry
- Diospyros ramiflora Roxb.
- Diospyros ramisonii G.E.Schatz & Lowry
- Diospyros ramulosa (E.Mey. ex A.DC.) De Winter
- Diospyros ranirisonii G.E.Schatz, Lowry & Phillipson
- Diospyros ranongensis Phengklai
- Diospyros ratovosonii H.N.Rakouth, G.E.Schatz & Lowry
- Diospyros reinae B.Walln.
- Diospyros rekoi Standl.
- Diospyros relit B.Walln.
- Diospyros reticulinervis C.Y.Wu
- Diospyros retusa H.N.Rakouth, G.E.Schatz & Lowry
- Diospyros revaughanii I.Richardson
- Diospyros revoluta Poir.
- Diospyros revolutissima F.White
- Diospyros rheophila Jessup
- Diospyros rheophytica Kosterm.
- Diospyros rhodocalyx Kurz
- Diospyros rhododendroides Kosterm.
- Diospyros rhombifolia Hemsl.
- Diospyros ridleyi Bakh.
- Diospyros ridsdalei Kosterm.
- Diospyros riedelii (Hiern) B.Walln.
- Diospyros rigida Hiern
- Diospyros robolot B.Walln.
- Diospyros ropourea B.Walln.
- Diospyros rosei Standl.
- Diospyros rostrata (Merr.) Bakh.
- Diospyros rotok B.Walln.
- Diospyros rotundifolia Hiern
- Diospyros rubicunda Gürke
- Diospyros rubripetiolata G.E.Schatz & Lowry
- Diospyros rufa King & Gamble
- Diospyros rufogemmata Lecomte
- Diospyros rufotomentosa G.E.Schatz & Lowry
- Diospyros rugosula R.Br.
- Diospyros rumphii Bakh.

== S ==
- Diospyros sahayadryensis P.Daniel & Vajr.
- Diospyros sakalavarum H.Perrier
- Diospyros saldanhae Kosterm.
- Diospyros salicifolia Humb. & Bonpl. ex Willd.
- Diospyros salletii Lecomte
- Diospyros sambiranensis Linan, H.N.Rakouth & Lowry
- Diospyros samoensis A.Gray
- Diospyros sandwicensis (A.DC.) Fosberg
- Diospyros sankurensis Gürke
- Diospyros santaremnensis Sandwith
- Diospyros sanza-minika A.Chev.
- Diospyros savannarum Kosterm.
- Diospyros saxatilis S.K.Lee
- Diospyros saxicola R.H.Miao
- Diospyros scabiosa Bakh.
- Diospyros scabra (Chiov.) Cufod.
- Diospyros scabrida (Harv. ex Hiern) De Winter
- Diospyros scalariformis H.R.Fletcher
- Diospyros schmidtii Craib
- Diospyros schmutzii Kosterm.
- Diospyros sclerophylla H.Perrier
- Diospyros scortechinii King & Gamble
- Diospyros scottmorii B.Walln.
- Diospyros selangorensis Bakh.
- Diospyros senensis Klotzsch
- Diospyros sennenii G.E.Schatz & Lowry
- Diospyros sericea A.DC.
- Diospyros shimbaensis F.White
- Diospyros siamang Bakh.
- Diospyros siderophylla H.L.Li
- Diospyros silicea G.E.Schatz, Lowry & Phillipson
- Diospyros simaloerensis Bakh.
- Diospyros simii (Kuntze) De Winter
- Diospyros singaporensis Bakh.
- Diospyros sintenisii (Krug & Urb.) Standl.
- Diospyros sleumeri Kosterm.
- Diospyros sogeriensis Bakh.
- Diospyros sonorae Standl.
- Diospyros soporifera Bakh.
- Diospyros sororia Bakh.
- Diospyros soubreana F.White
- Diospyros soyauxii Gürke & K.Schum.
- Diospyros sparsirama Hiern ex Greves
- Diospyros sphaerosepala Baker
- Diospyros sprucei Hiern
- Diospyros squamifolia Kosterm.
- Diospyros squamosa Bojer ex A.DC.
- Diospyros squarrosa Klotzsch
- Diospyros srilankana I.M.Turner
- Diospyros stenocarpa (H.Perrier) G.E.Schatz & Lowry
- Diospyros streptosepala Merr.
- Diospyros stricta Roxb.
- Diospyros strigosa Hemsl.
- Diospyros styraciformis King & Gamble
- Diospyros suarezensis G.E.Schatz, Lowry & Phillipson
- Diospyros suaveolens Gürke
- Diospyros subacuta Hiern
- Diospyros subargentea O.Lachenaud, Dauby & G.E.Schatz
- Diospyros subbullata G.E.Schatz & Lowry
- Diospyros subenervis (H.Perrier) G.E.Schatz & Lowry
- Diospyros subfalciformis H.Perrier
- Diospyros subrhomboidea King & Gamble
- Diospyros subrotata Hiern
- Diospyros subsessilifolia H.Perrier
- Diospyros subsessilis Kosterm.
- Diospyros subtrinervis H.Perrier
- Diospyros subtruncata Hochr.
- Diospyros sulcata Bourd.
- Diospyros sumatrana Miq.
- Diospyros sundaica Bakh.
- Diospyros sunyiensis Chun & H.Y.Chen
- Diospyros susarticulata Lecomte
- Diospyros sutchuensis Yen C.Yang
- Diospyros sylvatica Roxb.

== T ==
- Diospyros tahanensis Bakh.
- Diospyros taikintana G.E.Schatz & Lowry
- Diospyros tampinensis H.Perrier
- Diospyros tampolensis H.N.Rakouth, Lowry & G.E.Schatz
- Diospyros tarim B.Walln.
- Diospyros tehno C.Puglisi, Jimbo & Hagwood
- Diospyros tenuiflora A.C.Sm.
- Diospyros tenuipes Merr.
- Diospyros tepu B.Walln.
- Diospyros terminalis Kosterm.
- Diospyros tero B.Walln.
- Diospyros tessellaria Poir.
- Diospyros tessmannii Mildbr.
- Diospyros tetraceros H.Perrier
- Diospyros tetrandra Hiern
- Diospyros tetrapoda H.Perrier
- Diospyros tetrasperma Sw.
- Diospyros texana Scheele
- Diospyros thaiensis Phengklai
- Diospyros thomasii Hutch. & Dalziel
- Diospyros thorelii (Lecomte) T.H.Nguyên
- Diospyros thouarsii Hiern
- Diospyros thwaitesii (Hiern) Bedd.
- Diospyros tireliae F.White
- Diospyros tonkinensis A.Chev.
- Diospyros toposia Buch.-Ham.
- Diospyros toposioides King & Gamble
- Diospyros torquata H.Perrier
- Diospyros touranensis Lecomte
- Diospyros toxicaria Hiern
- Diospyros transita (Bakh.) Kosterm.
- Diospyros transitoria Bakh.
- Diospyros trianthos Phengkhlai
- Diospyros trichophylla Alston
- Diospyros tricolor (Schumach. & Thonn.) Hiern
- Diospyros tridentata F.White
- Diospyros tristis King & Gamble
- Diospyros trisulca F.White
- Diospyros trombetensis Sandwith
- Diospyros tropophylla (H.Perrier) G.E.Schatz & Lowry
- Diospyros troupinii F.White
- Diospyros truncata Zoll. & Moritzi
- Diospyros truncatifolia Caveney
- Diospyros tsangii Merr.
- Diospyros tuberculata Bakh.
- Diospyros turfosa Kosterm.
- Diospyros tutcheri Dunn

== U-Z ==
- Diospyros uaupensis Cavalcante
- Diospyros udaiyanii Udayan
- Diospyros ulo Merr.
- Diospyros ultima G.E.Schatz & Lowry
- Diospyros umbrosa F.White
- Diospyros undulata Wall. ex G.Don
- Diospyros undulaticalyx Linan, H.N.Rakouth & Lowry
- Diospyros unisemina C.Y.Wu
- Diospyros urep B.Walln.
- Diospyros urschii H.Perrier
- Diospyros uvida Jessup
- Diospyros uzungwaensis Frim.-Møll. & Ndang.
- Diospyros vaccinioides Lindl.
- Diospyros variegata Kurz
- Diospyros veillonii F.White
- Diospyros velutipes (H.Perrier) G.E.Schatz & Lowry
- Diospyros venablesii W.E.Cooper
- Diospyros venenosa Bakh.
- Diospyros venosa Wall. ex A.DC.
- Diospyros vermoesenii De Wild.
- Diospyros verrucosa Hiern
- Diospyros vescoi Hiern
- Diospyros vieillardii (Hiern) Kosterm.
- Diospyros vignei F.White
- Diospyros villosa (L.) De Winter
- Diospyros villosiuscula Kosterm.
- Diospyros virgata (Gürke) Brenan
- Diospyros virginiana L.
- Diospyros viridicans Hiern
- Diospyros vitiensis Gillespie
- Diospyros wagemansii F.White
- Diospyros wajirensis F.White
- Diospyros walkeri (Wight) Gürke
- Diospyros wallichii King & Gamble
- Diospyros whitei Dowsett-Lemaire & Pannell
- Diospyros whitfordii Merr.
- Diospyros whyteana (Hiern) F.White
- Diospyros winitii H.R.Fletcher
- Diospyros xavantina Sothers
- Diospyros xiangguiensis S.K.Lee
- Diospyros xishuangbannaensis C.Y.Wu & H.Chu
- Diospyros xylocarpa Y.M.Shui, W.H.Chen & Sima
- Diospyros yandina Jessup
- Diospyros yaouhensis (Schltr.) Kosterm.
- Diospyros yatesiana Standl.
- Diospyros yeobii Bakh.
- Diospyros yomomo B.Walln.
- Diospyros yucatanensis Lundell
- Diospyros yunnanensis Rehder & E.H.Wilson
- Diospyros zahamenensis Lowry, G.E.Schatz, Linan & H.N.Rakouth
- Diospyros zenkeri (Gürke) F.White
- Diospyros zhenfengensis S.K.Lee
- Diospyros zombensis (B.L.Burtt) F.White
