= Diospyros andamanica =

Scientific classification
- Kingdom: Plantae
- Clade: Tracheophytes
- Clade: Angiosperms
- Clade: Eudicots
- Clade: Asterids
- Order: Ericales
- Family: Ebenaceae
- Genus: Diospyros
- Species: D. andamanica

Binomial name
- Diospyros andamanica (Kurz) Bakh.

Synonyms
- List: Ebenus andamanica (Kurz) Kuntze; Maba andamanica (Kurz) Kurz; Macreightia andamanica Kurz; Diospyros carpinifolia (Ridl.) Bakh.; Diospyros carpinifolia f. puberula Bakh.; Diospyros longipedunculata Kosterm.; Diospyros malayana Bakh.; Diospyros malayana var. aequabilis Bakh.; Diospyros malayana var. ruminata Bakh.; Diospyros trimera H.R.Fletcher; Ebenus punctata (Hiern) Kuntze; Maba carpinifolia Ridl.; Maba punctata Hiern; Maba racemosa Ridl.; Maba sumatrana Miq.; Maba tahanensis Bakh.

Species of flowering plant

Diospyros andamanica is a tree in the family Ebenaceae.

== Description ==
Diospyros andamanica grows up to 20 m (70 ft) tall. The twigs are rusty brown or blackish. The inflorescences bear up to 30 or more flowers. The fruits are roundish to ellipsoid, up to 3 cm (1.2 in) in diameter.

== Taxonomy ==
Diospyros andamanica was first described in 1870 as Macreightia andamanica by German botanist Wilhelm Sulpiz Kurz in the Report on the Vegetation of the Andaman Islands. In 1937, the Dutch botanist Reinier van den Brink transferred the species to the genus Diospyros. The syntypes were collected in the Andaman Islands. The species is named after the Andaman Islands.

== Distribution and habitat ==
Diospyros andamanica is native to the Andaman Islands, Sumatra, Peninsular Malaysia, Borneo and Thailand. Its habitat is mixed dipterocarp forests from sea level to 700 m (2,300 ft) altitude.
