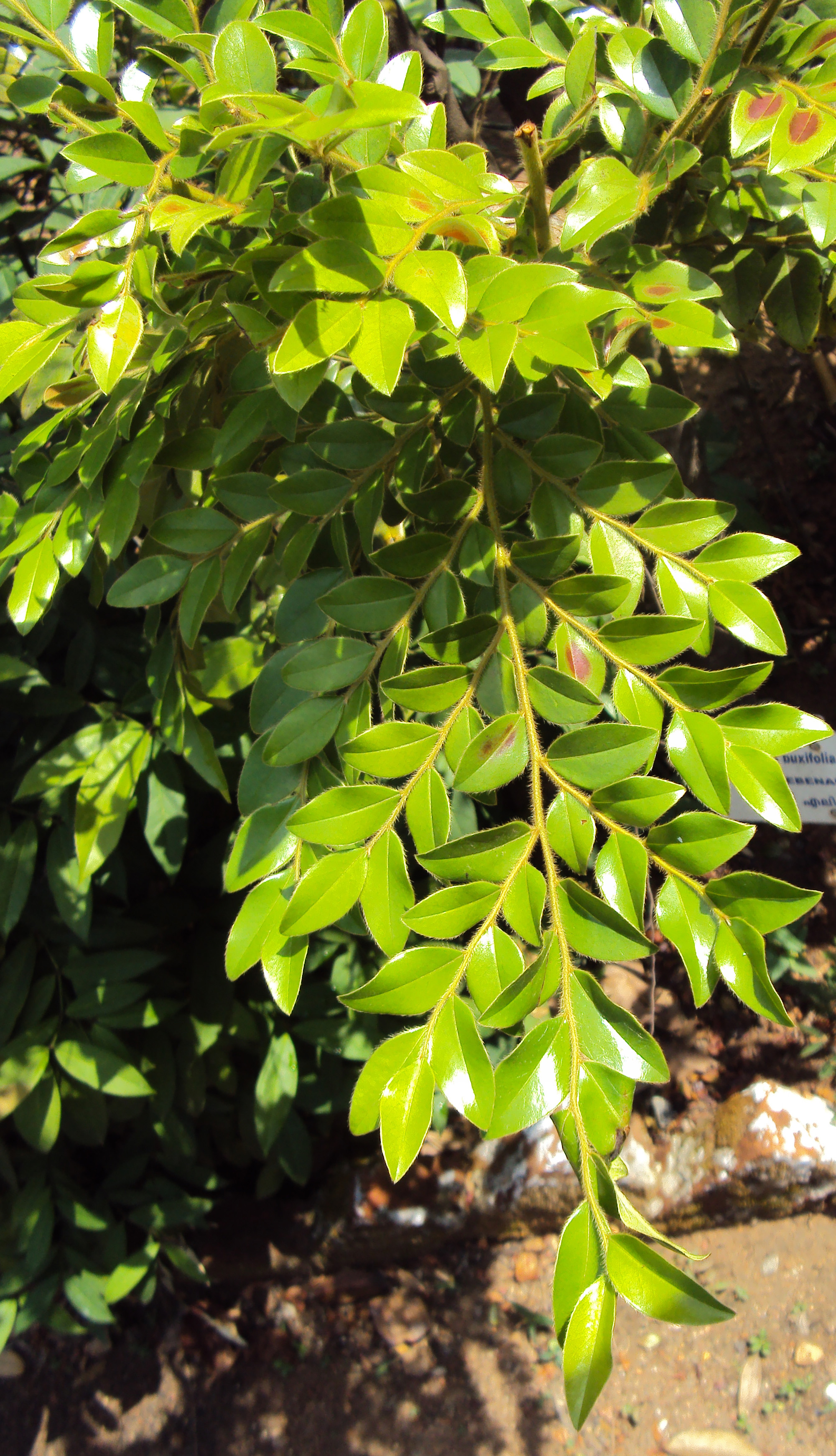

Conservation status
- Least Concern (IUCN 3.1)

Scientific classification
- Kingdom: Plantae
- Clade: Tracheophytes
- Clade: Angiosperms
- Clade: Eudicots
- Clade: Asterids
- Order: Ericales
- Family: Ebenaceae
- Genus: Diospyros
- Species: D. buxifolia

Binomial name
- Diospyros buxifolia (Blume) Hiern

Synonyms
- Diospyros elegantissima Bakh.; Diospyros microphylla Bedd.; Diospyros munda Hiern; Ebenus buxifolia (Blume) Kuntze; Leucoxylum buxifolium Blume; Maba elegans Ridl.

= Diospyros buxifolia =

Species of flowering plant

Diospyros buxifolia is a tree in the family Ebenaceae. It grows up to 30 metres (100 ft) tall. Inflorescences bear up to five flowers. The fruits are ellipsoid, up to 1.6 cm (1 in) long. The specific epithet buxifolia is from the Latin, referring to the leaves' resemblance to those of the genus Buxus. Habitat is forests from sea level to 1,000 metres (3,300 ft) altitude. D. buxifolia is found widely from India to Indochina and in Malesia as far as New Guinea.
