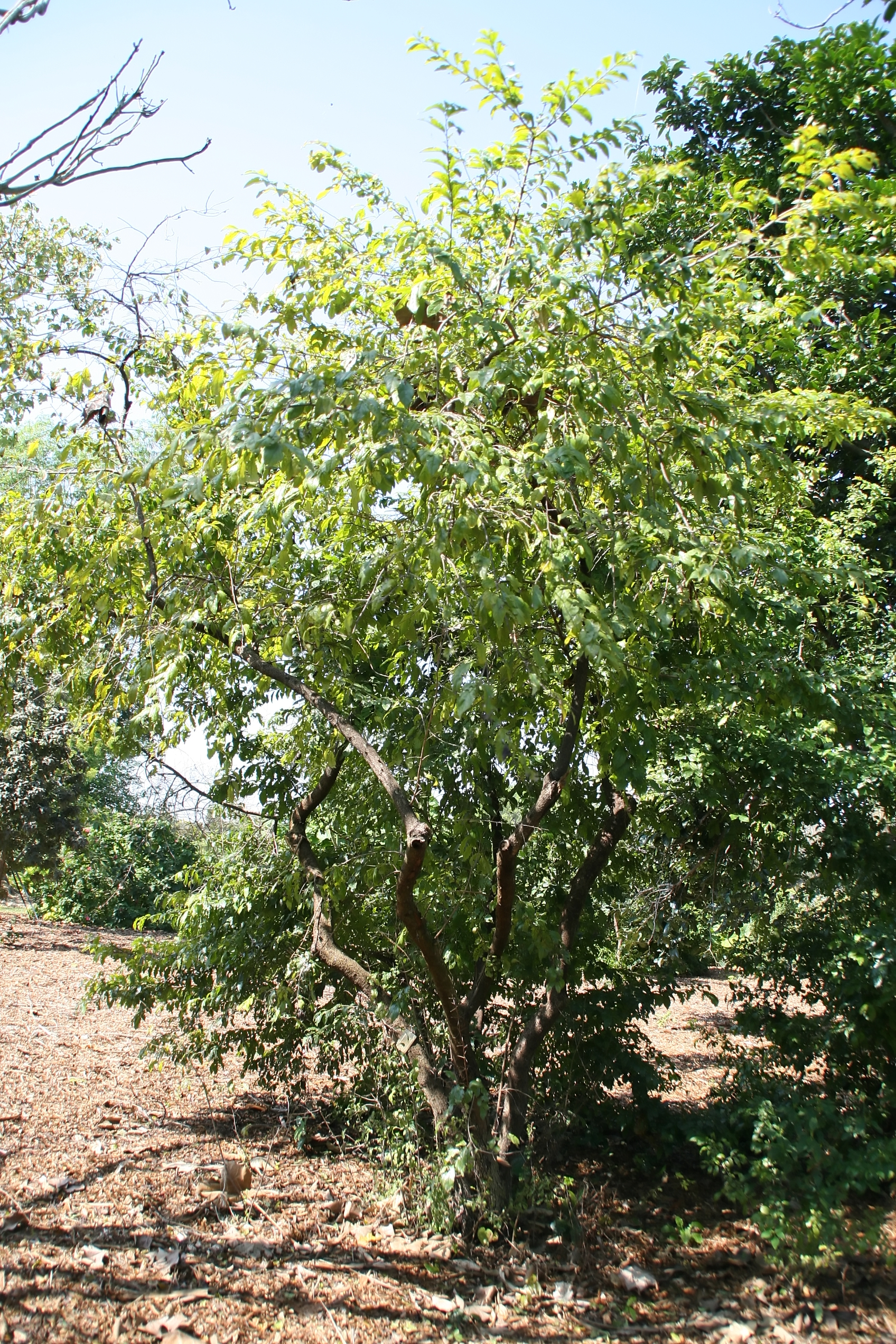
- At Fairchild Tropical Botanic Garden, Miami

Scientific classification
- Kingdom: Plantae
- Clade: Tracheophytes
- Clade: Angiosperms
- Clade: Eudicots
- Clade: Asterids
- Order: Ericales
- Family: Ebenaceae
- Genus: Diospyros
- Species: D. subrhomboidea

Binomial name
- Diospyros subrhomboidea King & Gamble

Synonyms
- Diospyros boerlagei Valeton; Diospyros confusa Bakh.; Diospyros jaheri Bakh.

= Diospyros subrhomboidea =

Species of tree

Diospyros subrhomboidea is a tree in the family Ebenaceae. It grows up to 20 metres (70 ft) tall. Inflorescences bear a solitary flower. The fruits are round, up to 1.5 cm (1 in) in diameter. The specific epithet subrhomboidea is from the Latin meaning 'somewhat rhombic', referring to the leaf shape. Habitat is mixed dipterocarp forests from sea-level to 700 metres (2,000 ft) altitude. D. subrhomboidea is found in Sumatra, Peninsular Malaysia, Singapore, Java and Borneo.
