= Diospyros bussei =

Conservation status
- Near Threatened (IUCN 3.1)

Scientific classification
- Kingdom: Plantae
- Clade: Embryophytes
- Clade: Tracheophytes
- Clade: Spermatophytes
- Clade: Angiosperms
- Clade: Eudicots
- Clade: Asterids
- Order: Ericales
- Family: Ebenaceae
- Genus: Diospyros
- Species: D. bussei

Binomial name
- Diospyros bussei Gürke

Species of plant

Diospyros bussei is a tree species found in Kenya and Tanzania, while its presence is uncertain in Somalia.

Its habitat is shrubland. It is threatened through hacking and fires to create grassland for grazing.
