= Diospyros agnitser =

Scientific classification
- Kingdom: Plantae
- Clade: Tracheophytes
- Clade: Angiosperms
- Clade: Eudicots
- Clade: Asterids
- Order: Ericales
- Family: Ebenaceae
- Genus: Diospyros
- Species: D. agnitser

Binomial name
- Diospyros agnitser B.Walln.

Species of tree

Diospyros agnitser is a tree of the genus Diospyros endemic to Northeast Brazil.
