= Diospyros sumatrana =

Conservation status
- Data Deficient (IUCN 3.1)

Scientific classification
- Kingdom: Plantae
- Clade: Tracheophytes
- Clade: Angiosperms
- Clade: Eudicots
- Clade: Asterids
- Order: Ericales
- Family: Ebenaceae
- Genus: Diospyros
- Species: D. sumatrana

Binomial name
- Diospyros sumatrana Miq.

Synonyms
- List: Diospyros beccarii Hiern; Diospyros decipiens C.B.Clarke; Diospyros dumosa King & Gamble; Diospyros flavicans Hiern; Diospyros glomerulata King & Gamble; Diospyros graciliflora Hiern; Diospyros hendersonii Ridl.; Diospyros koordersii Hiern ex Koord.; Diospyros monticola Kosterm.; Diospyros tubicalyx Ridl.; Diospyros velutinosa Bakh.; Ebenus beccarii (Hiern) Kuntze; Ebenus sumatrana (Miq.) Kuntze

Species of flowering plant

Diospyros sumatrana is a tree in the family Ebenaceae. The specific epithet refers to Sumatra.

== Description ==
Diospyros sumatrana grows up to 30 metres (100 ft) tall. The inflorescences bear up to three flowers. The fruits are ellipsoid or oblong, measuring up to 2.5 cm (1 in) long.

== Distribution and habitat ==
Diospyros sumatrana is native to an area from Indochina to Malesia. Its habitat is lowland mixed dipterocarp forests.
