= Diospyros alatella =

Conservation status
- Endangered (IUCN 3.1)

Scientific classification
- Kingdom: Plantae
- Clade: Tracheophytes
- Clade: Angiosperms
- Clade: Eudicots
- Clade: Asterids
- Order: Ericales
- Family: Ebenaceae
- Genus: Diospyros
- Species: D. alatella

Binomial name
- Diospyros alatella Kosterm.

Species of flowering plant

Diospyros alatella is a tree in the family Ebenaceae. It is native to Borneo.

== Description ==
Diospyros alatella grows up to 33 m (110 ft) tall. The leaves are oblong and measure up to 37 cm (15 in) long and to 13 cm (5 in) wide. The fruits are solitary, up to 4.5 cm (1.8 in) in diameter.

== Taxonomy ==
Diospyros alatella was described by Indonesian botanist André Kostermans in Blumea in 1977. The type specimen was collected in Bintulu District in Sarawak, Borneo. The specific epithet alatella means 'with small wing', referring to the fruit.

== Distribution and habitat ==
Diospyros alatella is endemic to Borneo, where it is confined to Sarawak. Its habitat is lowland mixed dipterocarp forests and lower montane rain forests from sea level to 1,200 m (4,000 ft) elevation.

== Conservation ==
Diospyros alatella has been assessed as endangered on the IUCN Red List. It is threatened by harvesting for its timber and by conversion of its habitat for commercial plantations. It is present in one protected area, Semenggoh Nature Reserve.

== Uses ==
The timber is classified as a medium hardwood. It is locally used in construction and in the making of furniture and musical instruments.
