= Diospyros gillespiei =

Scientific classification
- Kingdom: Plantae
- Clade: Tracheophytes
- Clade: Angiosperms
- Clade: Eudicots
- Clade: Asterids
- Order: Ericales
- Family: Ebenaceae
- Genus: Diospyros
- Species: D. gillespiei

Binomial name
- Diospyros gillespiei (Fosberg) Kosterm.

Species of tree

Diospyros gillespiei is a species of tree in the family Ebenaceae. It is endemic to Fiji.
