= Diospyros pendula =

Conservation status
- Least Concern (IUCN 3.1)

Scientific classification
- Kingdom: Plantae
- Clade: Tracheophytes
- Clade: Angiosperms
- Clade: Eudicots
- Clade: Asterids
- Order: Ericales
- Family: Ebenaceae
- Genus: Diospyros
- Species: D. pendula

Binomial name
- Diospyros pendula Hasselt ex Hassk.

Synonyms
- Diospyros fuliginea Hiern; Diospyros oleifolia Wall. ex Kurz; Diospyros penduliflora Zoll.; Diospyros schmidtii Craib

Species of tree

Diospyros pendula is a tree in the family Ebenaceae. It grows up to 20 metres (70 ft) tall. The fruits are round to ovoid, up to 3.5 cm (1 in) in diameter. The specific epithet pendula is from the Latin meaning 'hanging down', referring to the inflorescence. Habitat is lowland mixed dipterocarp forests. D. pendula is found from Indochina to west Malesia.
