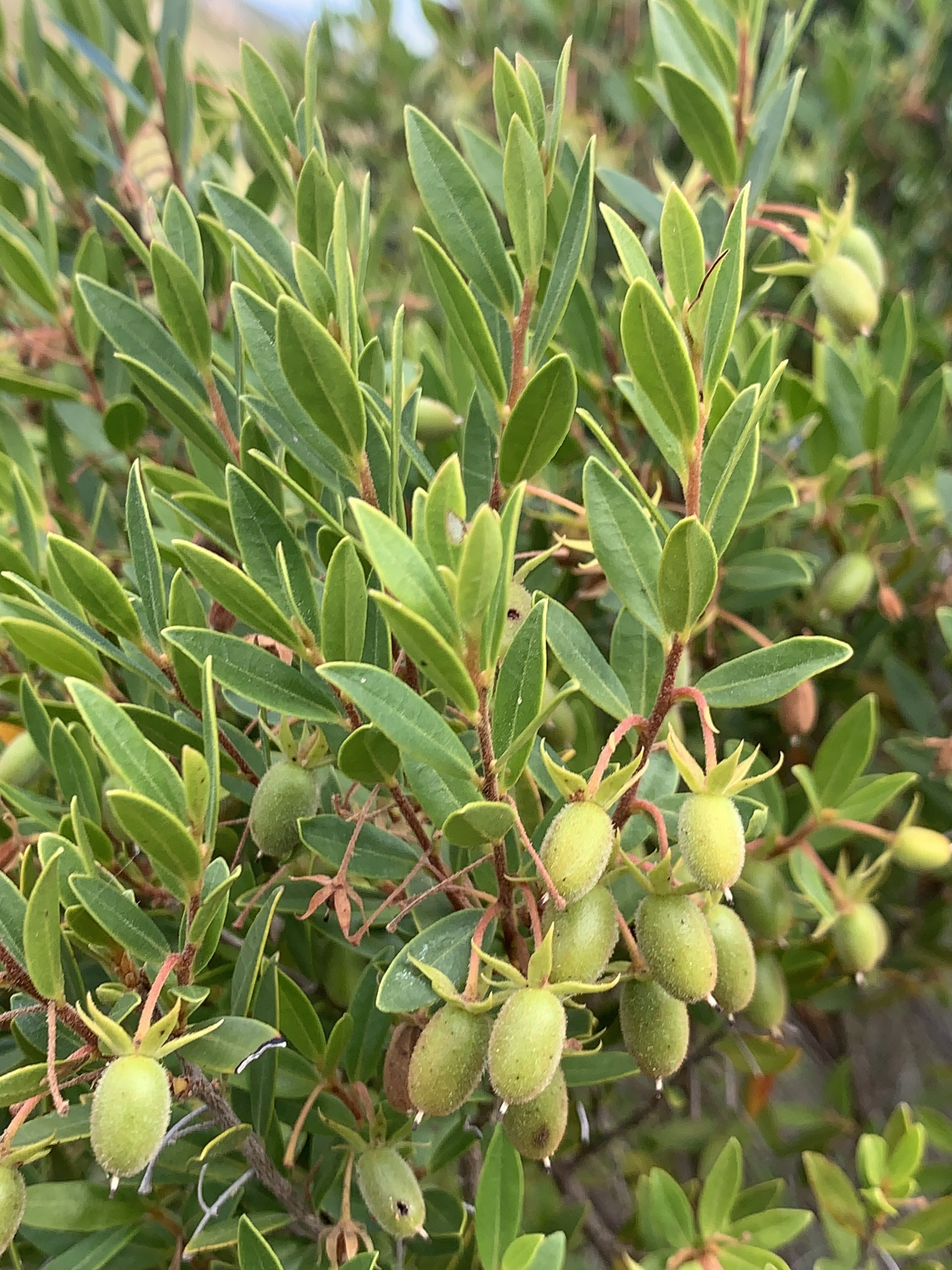
- In Fernkloof Nature Reserve

Conservation status
- Least Concern (IUCN 3.1)

Scientific classification
- Kingdom: Plantae
- Clade: Tracheophytes
- Clade: Angiosperms
- Clade: Eudicots
- Clade: Asterids
- Order: Ericales
- Family: Ebenaceae
- Genus: Diospyros
- Species: D. glabra

Binomial name
- Diospyros glabra (L.) De Winter

Synonyms
- Royena angustifolia Salisb.; Royena falcata E.Mey. ex A.DC.; Royena glabra L.; Royena myrtifolia Salisb.; Vaccinium pensylvanicum Mill.

= Diospyros glabra =

Species of plant

Diospyros glabra, the fynbos star-apple, is a species of flowering plant in the family Ebenaceae, native to the Cape Provinces of South Africa. It is an evergreen shrub or small tree reaching 5 m (16 ft), found in a variety of fynbos habitats.
