= Diospyros domarkind =

Scientific classification
- Kingdom: Plantae
- Clade: Tracheophytes
- Clade: Angiosperms
- Clade: Eudicots
- Clade: Asterids
- Order: Ericales
- Family: Ebenaceae
- Genus: Diospyros
- Species: D. domarkind

Binomial name
- Diospyros domarkind B.Walln.

Species of plant

Diospyros domarkind is a species of flowering plant in the ebony and persimmon family Ebenaceae, native to Colombia. Preferring to grow in wet tropical areas, it is a tree reaching 12 m (39 ft) with pinkish bark.
