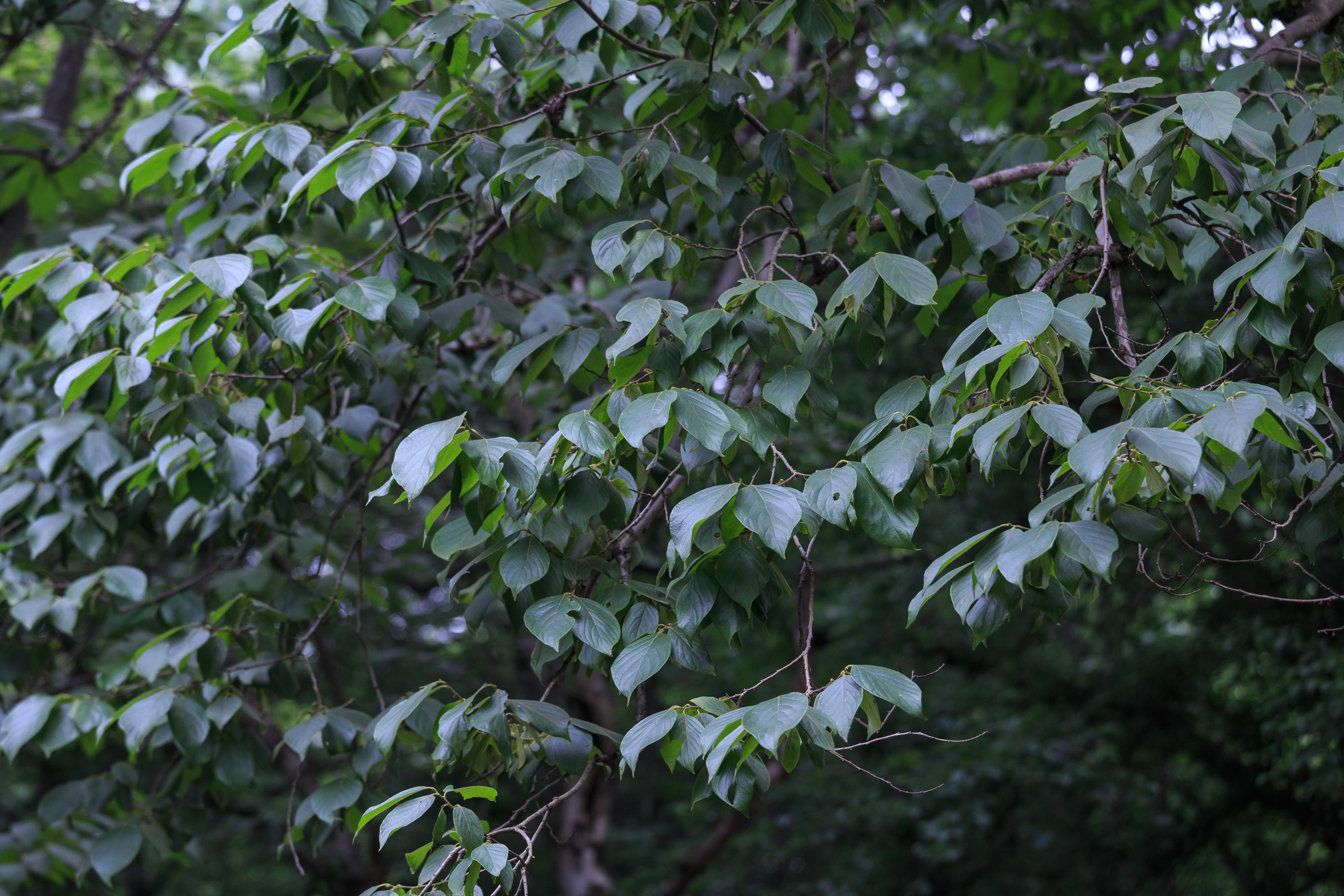
- Foliage
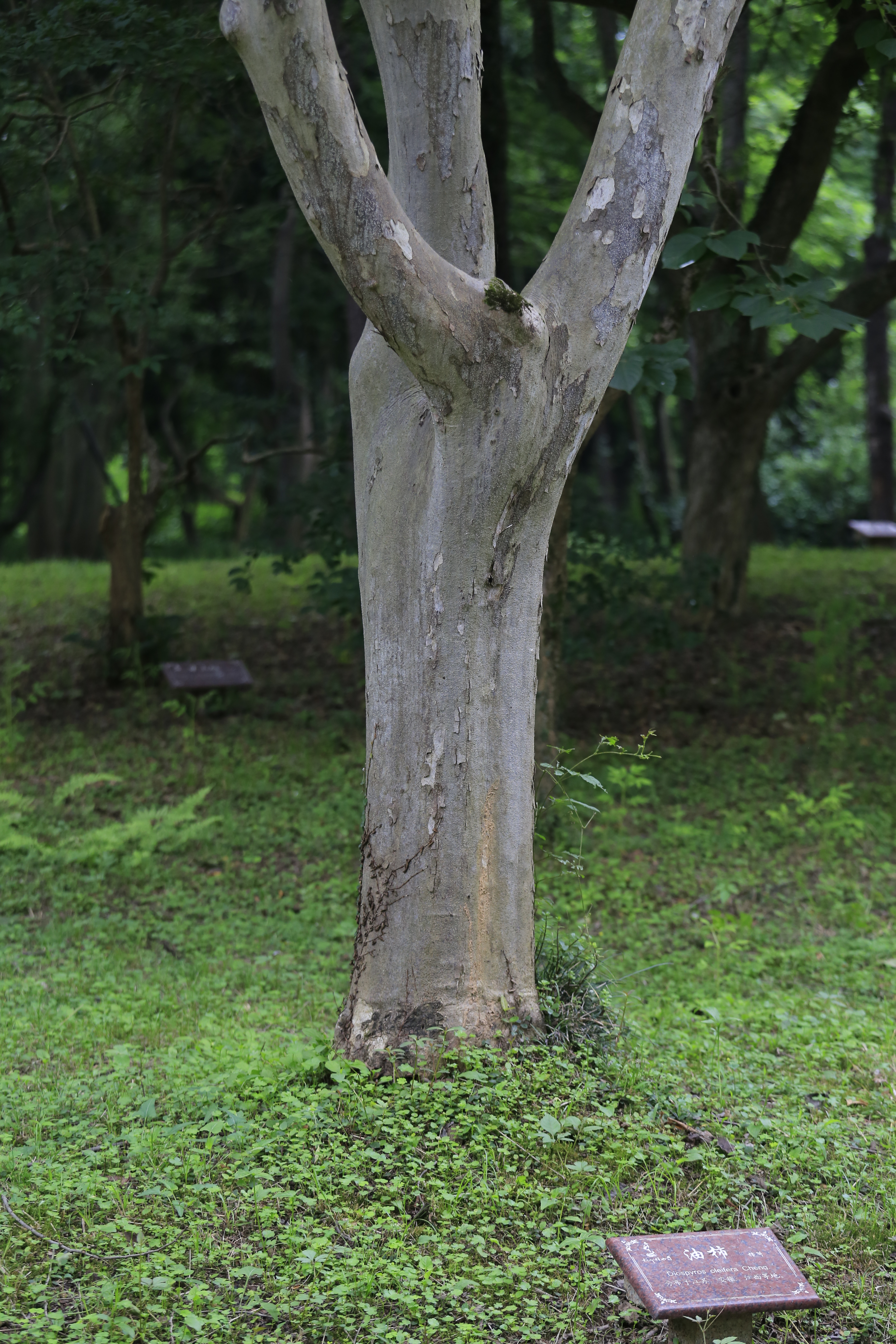
- Trunk

Conservation status
- Least Concern (IUCN 3.1)

Scientific classification
- Kingdom: Plantae
- Clade: Tracheophytes
- Clade: Angiosperms
- Clade: Eudicots
- Clade: Asterids
- Order: Ericales
- Family: Ebenaceae
- Genus: Diospyros
- Species: D. oleifera

Binomial name
- Diospyros oleifera W.C.Cheng

= Diospyros oleifera =

Species of plant

Diospyros oleifera is a species of flowering plant in the persimmon family Ebenaceae, native to southeastern China. A tree reaching 14 m (46 ft), its genome has been sequenced.
