= Diospyros ovalifolia =

Scientific classification
- Kingdom: Plantae
- Clade: Tracheophytes
- Clade: Angiosperms
- Clade: Eudicots
- Clade: Asterids
- Order: Ericales
- Family: Ebenaceae
- Genus: Diospyros
- Species: D. ovalifolia

Binomial name
- Diospyros ovalifolia Wight

Species of flowering plant

Diospyros ovalifolia, known as bastard ebony, is a tree in the family, Ebenaceae (Ebony family), endemic to the leeward side of South Sahyadri of Western Ghats of India and Sri Lanka.

== Description ==
Full grown trees usually stand 12m tall.

Young branches are sparse-adpressed hairy. Leaves are simple, alternate, and distichous. Petiole is 0.5-1.0 cm long, canaliculate and glabrous. Lamina is 5-13 x 1.5–5 cm, usually narrow obovate. The leaf is coriaceous and glabrous with entire margin. Secondary veins are in 6-9 pairs.

== Ecology ==
Trees are found in dry evergreen forests up to 800 m altitude. With mature crowns occupying the canopy layer of the forest, they are known as canopy trees.

== Vernacular names ==
The plant is known as:

- Malayalam: Karimaram, Vedukkanari, Karimpala
- Sinhala: KunuMaella
- Others: Karimbala, Vedi kandru, Karimaram

== Flowering ==
Flowering and fruiting is usually in between March–August.

== External resources ==
- "Diospyros ovalifolia Wight". IOR-ARC Medicinal Plants Network. IOR-ARC RCSTT Medicinal Plant Network. Archived from the original on July 10, 2013.
- "Type of Diospyros ovalifolia Wight [family EBENACEAE]". JSTOR Global Plants. JSTOR. June 18, 2012.
- "Diospyros ovalifolia Wight". The Plant List (2010). Version 1. The Plant List 2010.
- "Woody Species Diospyros ovalifolia". TAXA Wood Knowledge Base. www.prowebcanada.com. Archived from the original on March 4, 2016.
- "Icones Plantarum Indiae Orientalis". The International Plant Names Index. International Plant Names Index.
