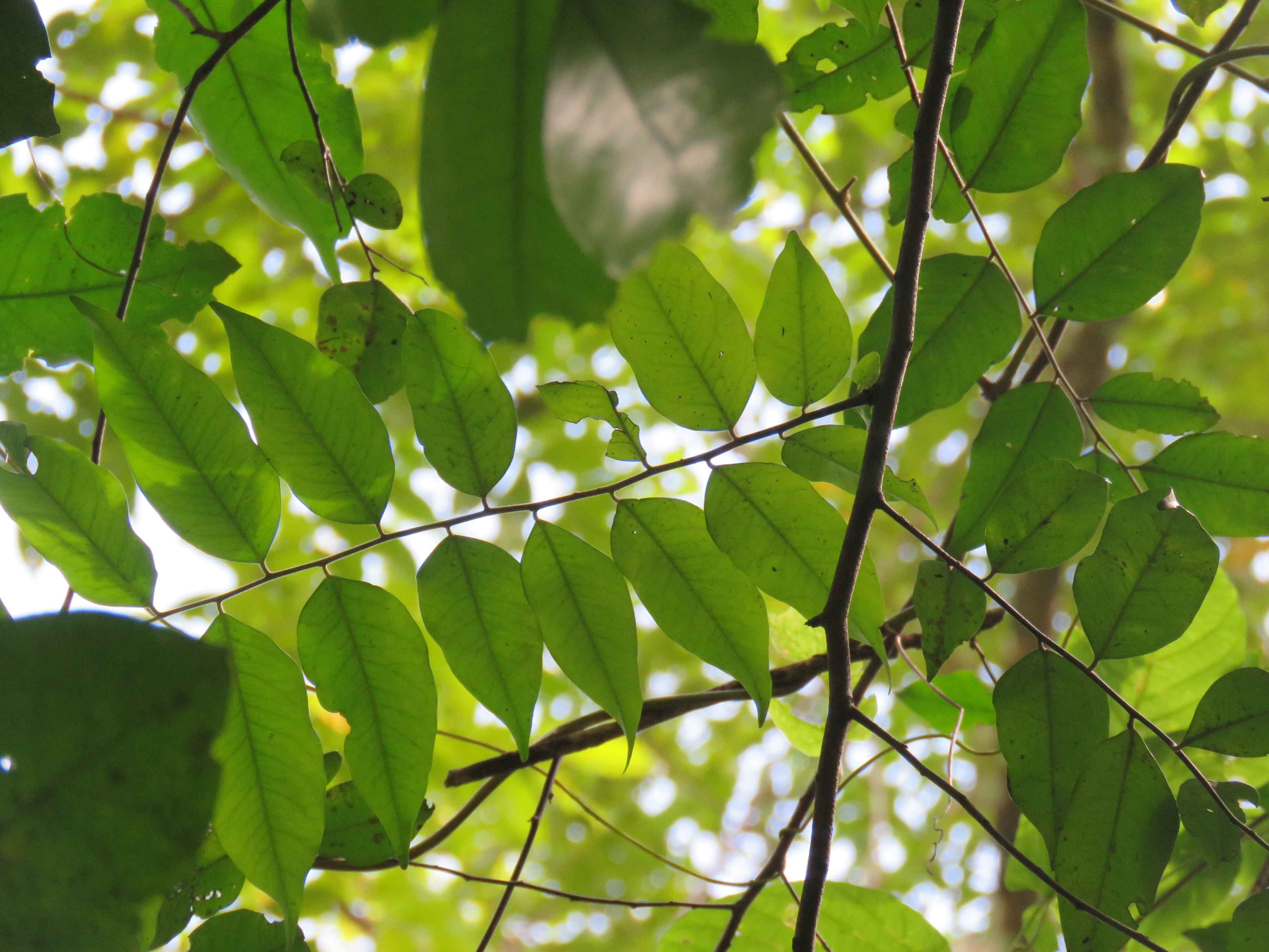
- Leaves of Diospyros kurzii

Conservation status
- Least Concern (IUCN 3.1)

Scientific classification
- Kingdom: Plantae
- Clade: Tracheophytes
- Clade: Angiosperms
- Clade: Eudicots
- Clade: Asterids
- Order: Ericales
- Family: Ebenaceae
- Genus: Diospyros
- Species: D. kurzii

Binomial name
- Diospyros kurzii Hiern

Synonyms
- Diospyros alata Elmer; Diospyros pubicarpa Ridl.; Diospyros wrayi King & Gamble

= Diospyros kurzii =

Species of tree

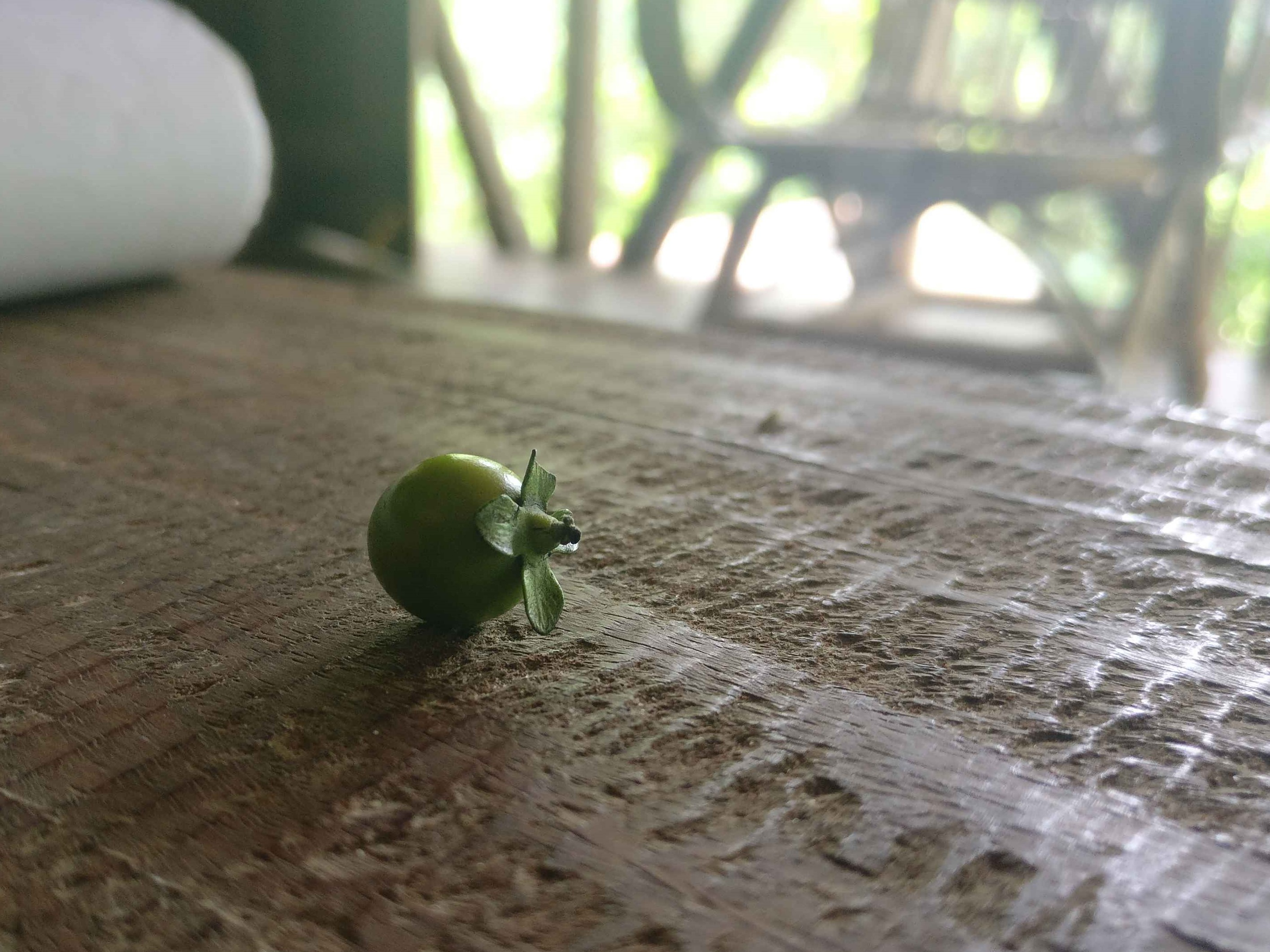
Fruit

Diospyros kurzii is a tree in the family Ebenaceae. It grows up to 30 metres (100 ft) tall. Twigs dry to black. The fruits are ellipsoid, up to 1.2 cm (0.5 in) long. The tree is named for the German botanist and curator W. S. Kurz. Habitat is lowland forests. D. kurzii is found in the Andaman and Nicobar Islands, Burma, Thailand, Peninsular Malaysia, Borneo, the Philippines and Maluku.
