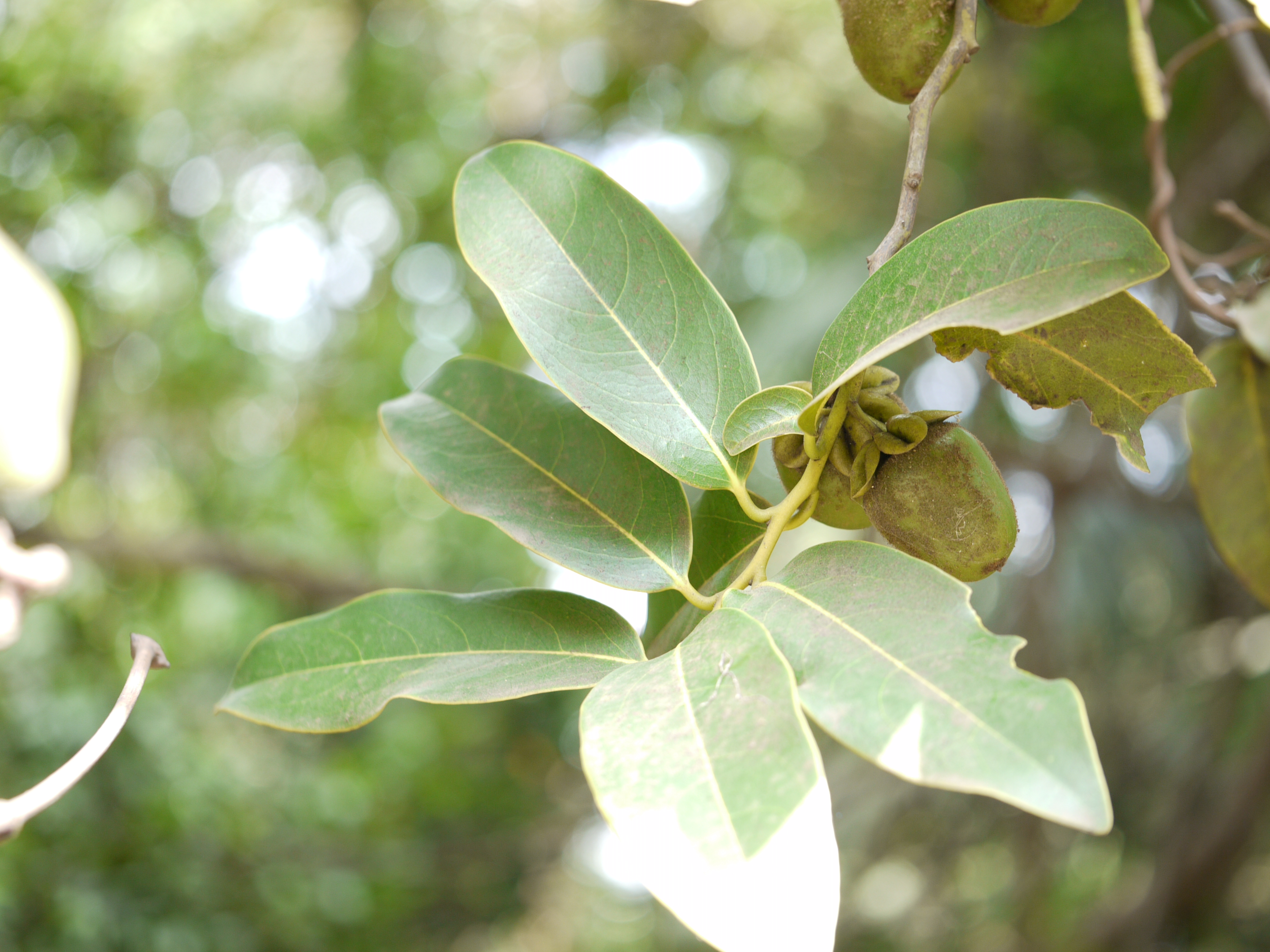

Conservation status
- Vulnerable (IUCN 3.1)

Scientific classification
- Kingdom: Plantae
- Clade: Embryophytes
- Clade: Tracheophytes
- Clade: Spermatophytes
- Clade: Angiosperms
- Clade: Eudicots
- Clade: Asterids
- Order: Ericales
- Family: Ebenaceae
- Genus: Diospyros
- Species: D. paniculata

Binomial name
- Diospyros paniculata Dalzell

= Diospyros paniculata =

Species of plant

Diospyros paniculata, or the panicle-flowered ebony, is a species of tree in the ebony family. Endemic to the Western Ghats area of India and parts of Bangladesh, the species is currently listed as Vulnerable in the IUCN Red List.

== Description ==
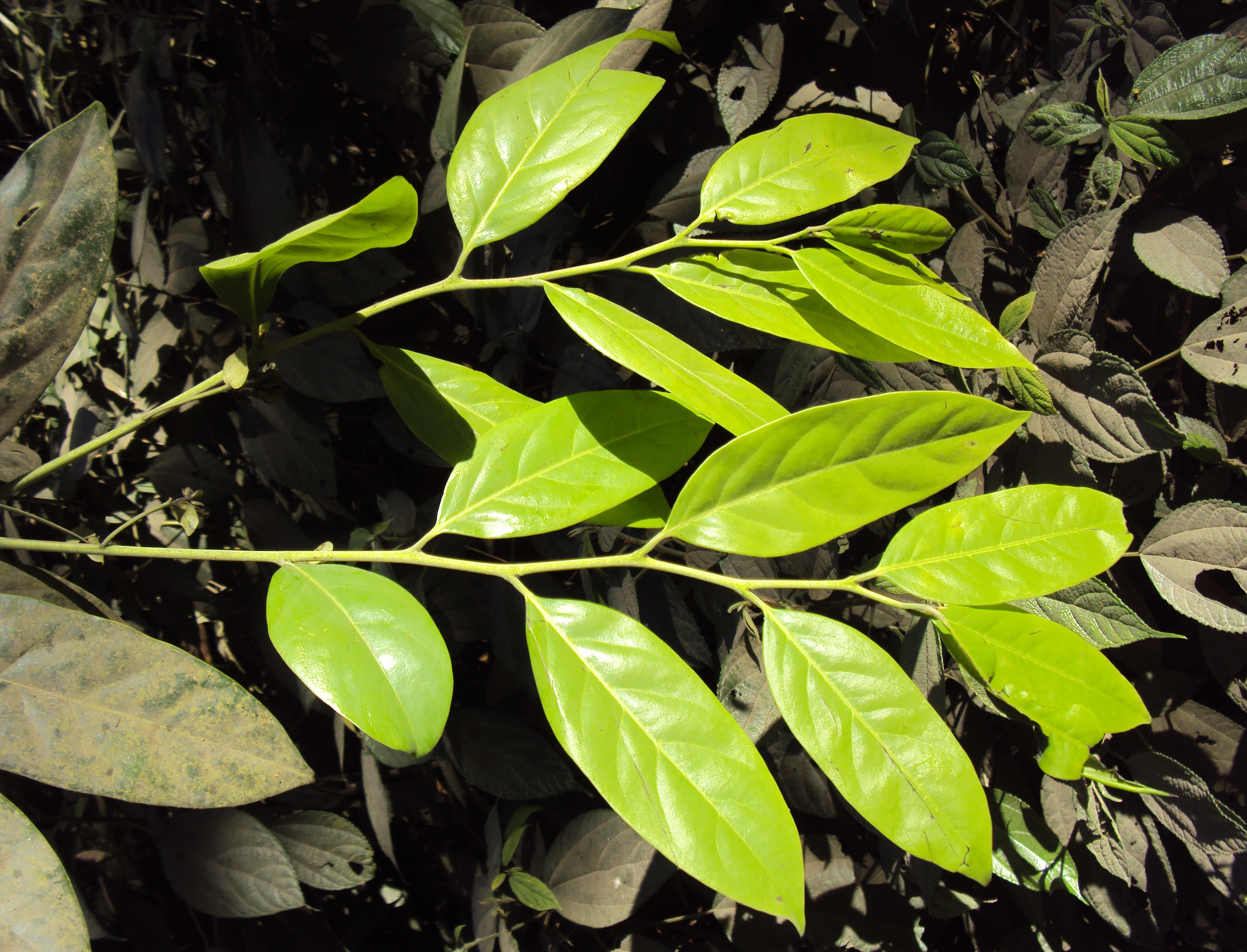
Branchlet with leaves

Evergreen trees up to 16 metres (52 ft) tall, with smooth, black bark. The blaze is a dull orange. The young branchlets are cylindrical, covered by black, sooty hairs. The tree's leaves are simple, alternate, distichous, with petioles about 0.5–1.1 centimetres (0.20–0.43 in) long, flat, glabrous. The leaf blade is about 9–27 centimetres (3.5–10.6 in) long by 3.5–8 centimetres (1.4–3.1 in) wide, and has an entire margin and a raised midrib. The leaf shape is usually narrow elliptic-oblong to lanceolate, with acute to acuminate apex ending in a blunt tip. The leaf base is acute to rounded. The leaf is thick (coriaceous) with minute pellucid dots beneath. The venation, with 6–9 pairs of secondary nerves, is strongly and closely reticulate on both surfaces.

The flowers are unisexual and greenish-yellow in colour. The male flowers appear in axillary paniculate cymes and have dull or creamy white corollas, with tube 12 millimetres (0.47 in) long. The female flowers are also axillary, but solitary or in cymes of 2 to 5 flowers. The calyx is covered with black sooty hairs. The fruit is a berry. The fruit is ovoid (egg-shaped) and about 3–4 centimetres (1.2–1.6 in) long by 2–3 centimetres (0.79–1.18 in) wide. It is yellowish brown in colour, with a coating of rusty and sooty hairs when young. As it matures, the fruit becomes glabrous (hairless). The calyx (1.5 by 3 cm) remains attached (accrescent) to the fruit. The fruit has four seeds, smooth in texture and 2 by 0.8 centimetres (0.79 by 0.31 in) in size.

== Range ==
The species is endemic to the Western Ghats, distributed along the central and southern tracts of the mountain range. It is distributed from the Konkan region of Maharashtra in the north, through western Karnataka (Uttara Kannada, Shimoga) in the central Western Ghats. In the southern Western Ghats it occurs in the states of Kerala (from Kannur in the north to Thiruvananthapuram in the south) and in Tamil Nadu (Anamalai hills of Coimbatore, Nilgiris, and Agashtyamalai hills of Tirunelveli District).

== Habitat ==
The species is found in low- and mid-elevation tropical wet evergreen forests, between 500 and 1,200 metres (1,600 and 3,900 ft) elevation.

== Ecology ==
The species is an understorey or sub-canopy tree. D. paniculata has an associated ascomycete fungal species Penicilliopsis clavariiformis, occurring on the fruits and seeds.

== Etymology ==
The generic name Diospyros is derived from the Ancient Greek: διόσπυρος: transl. grc – transl. dióspyros, from diós (Διός) and pyrós (πῡρός), which literally means "Zeus's wheat" but more generally intends "divine food" or "divine fruit". The specific epithet refers to the flower clusters (panicles). The plant is commonly known as panicle-flowered ebony in English. The following local names are known in Indian languages:

- Kannada: ಕರೆ ಮರ kare mara
- Malayalam: ഇല്ലെകട്ട illekatta, കാരി kari, കരിവെള്ള karivella
- Marathi: टेंबुरणी temburni
- Sanskrit: तिन्दुक tinduka
- Tamil: காரி kari, கருந்துவரை karu-n-tuvarai

== Taxonomy ==
The species has no synonyms reported.

== Uses ==
The species is known to have medicinal properties. Dried and powdered fruits are reportedly used for healing burns and a decoction prepared from the fruit is used for treating gonorrhoea and biliousness and for cleaning boils.

== Gallery ==
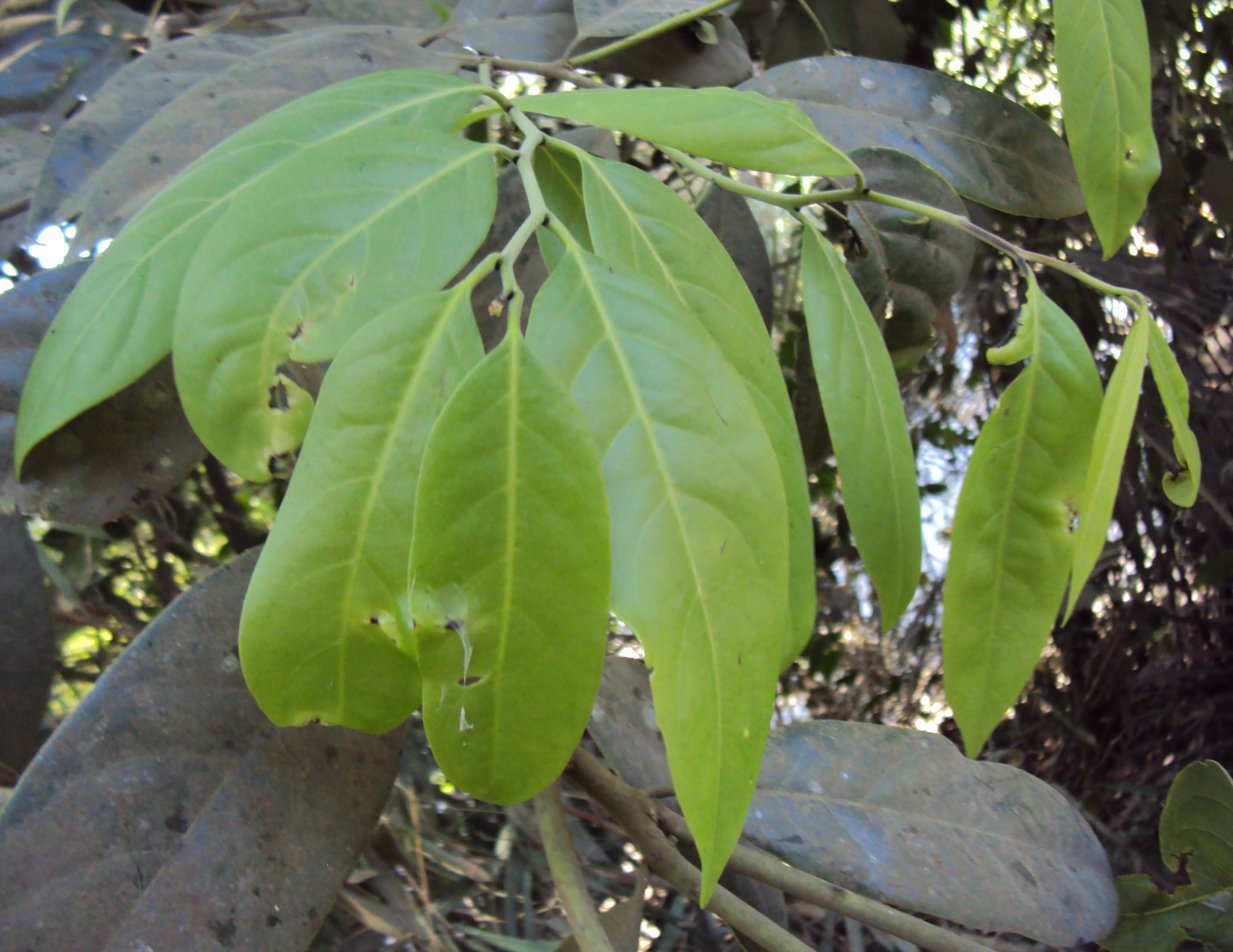
Leaves (upperside)

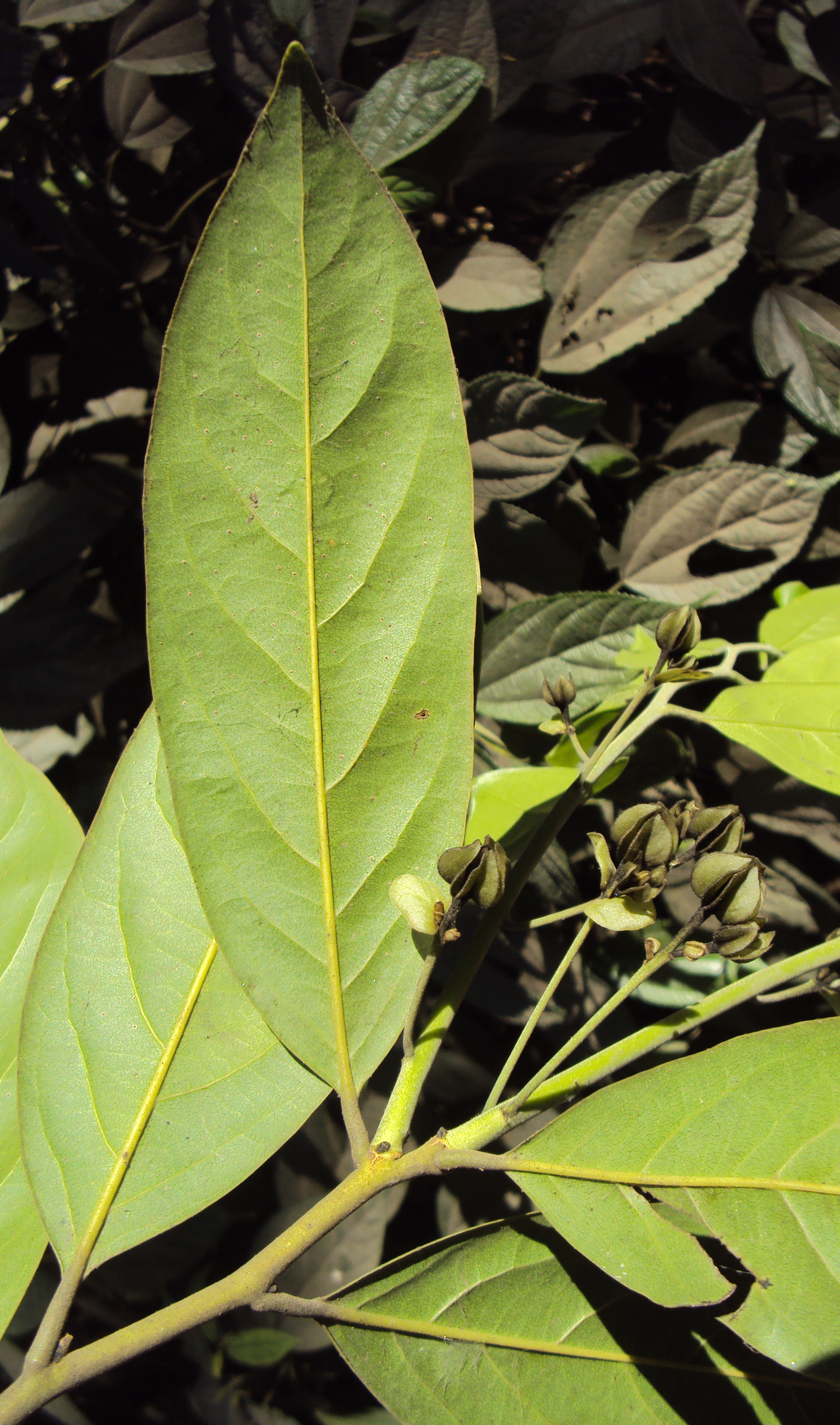
Underside of leaf

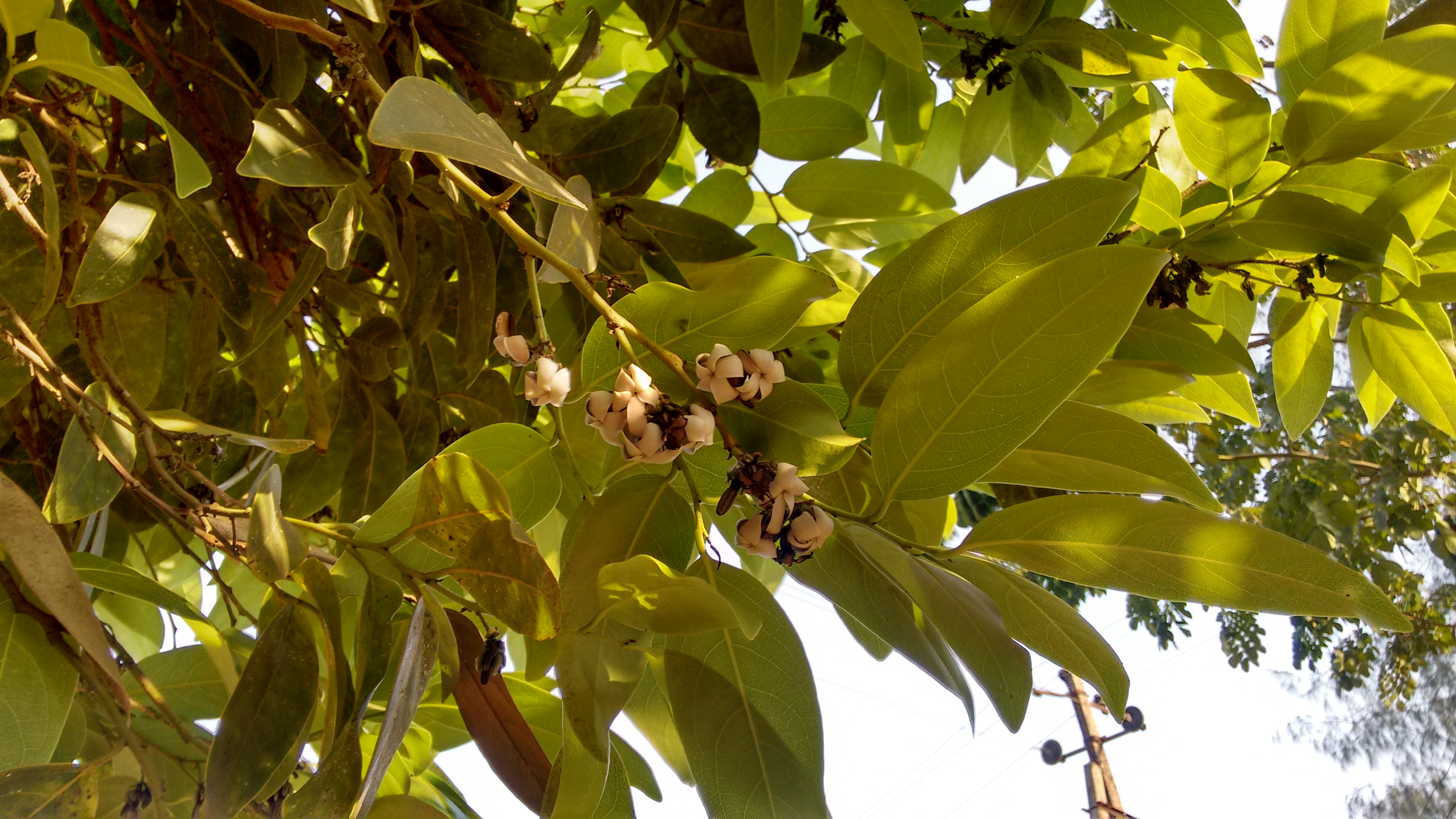
Branch with male flowers

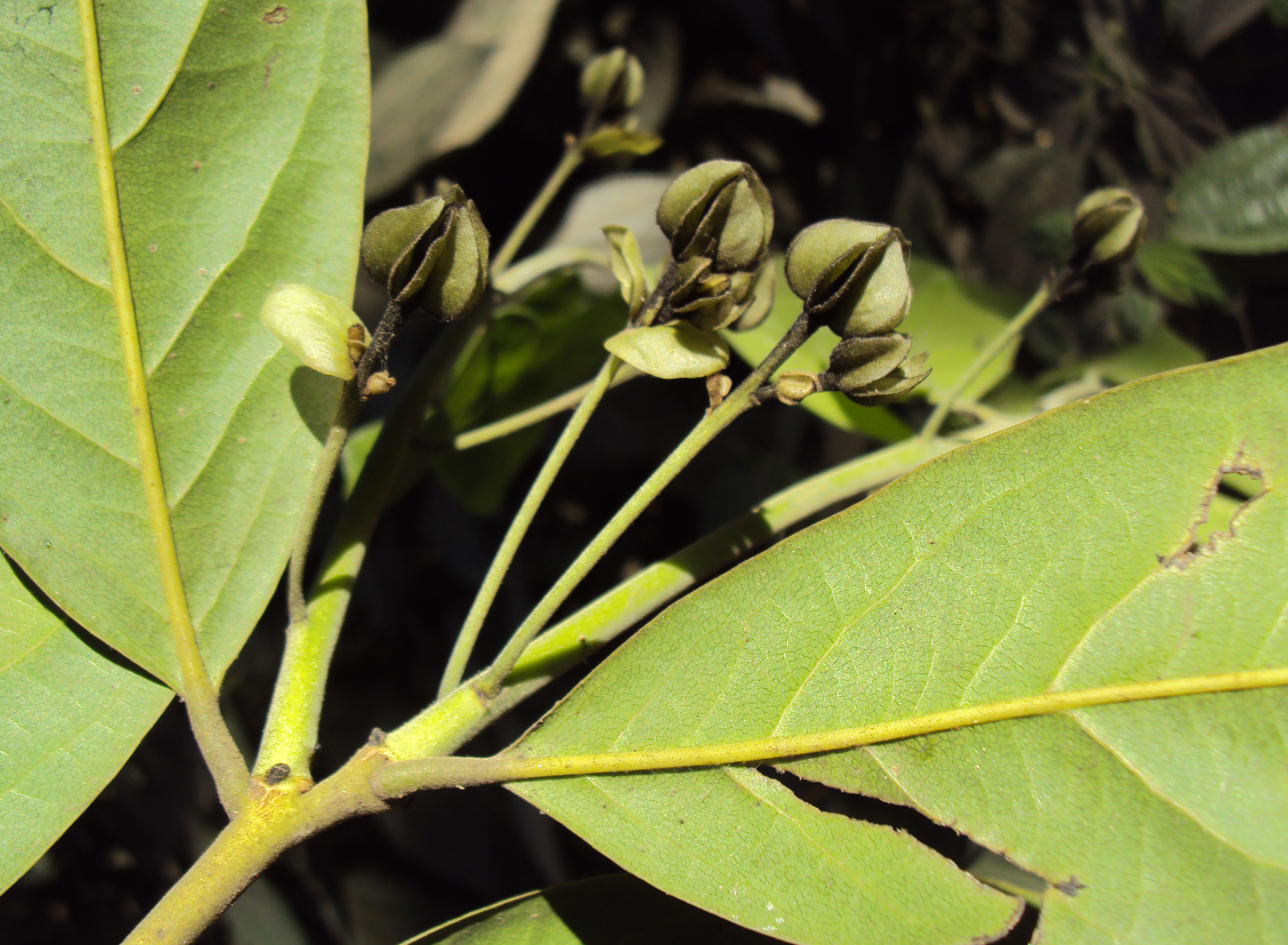
Female flowers

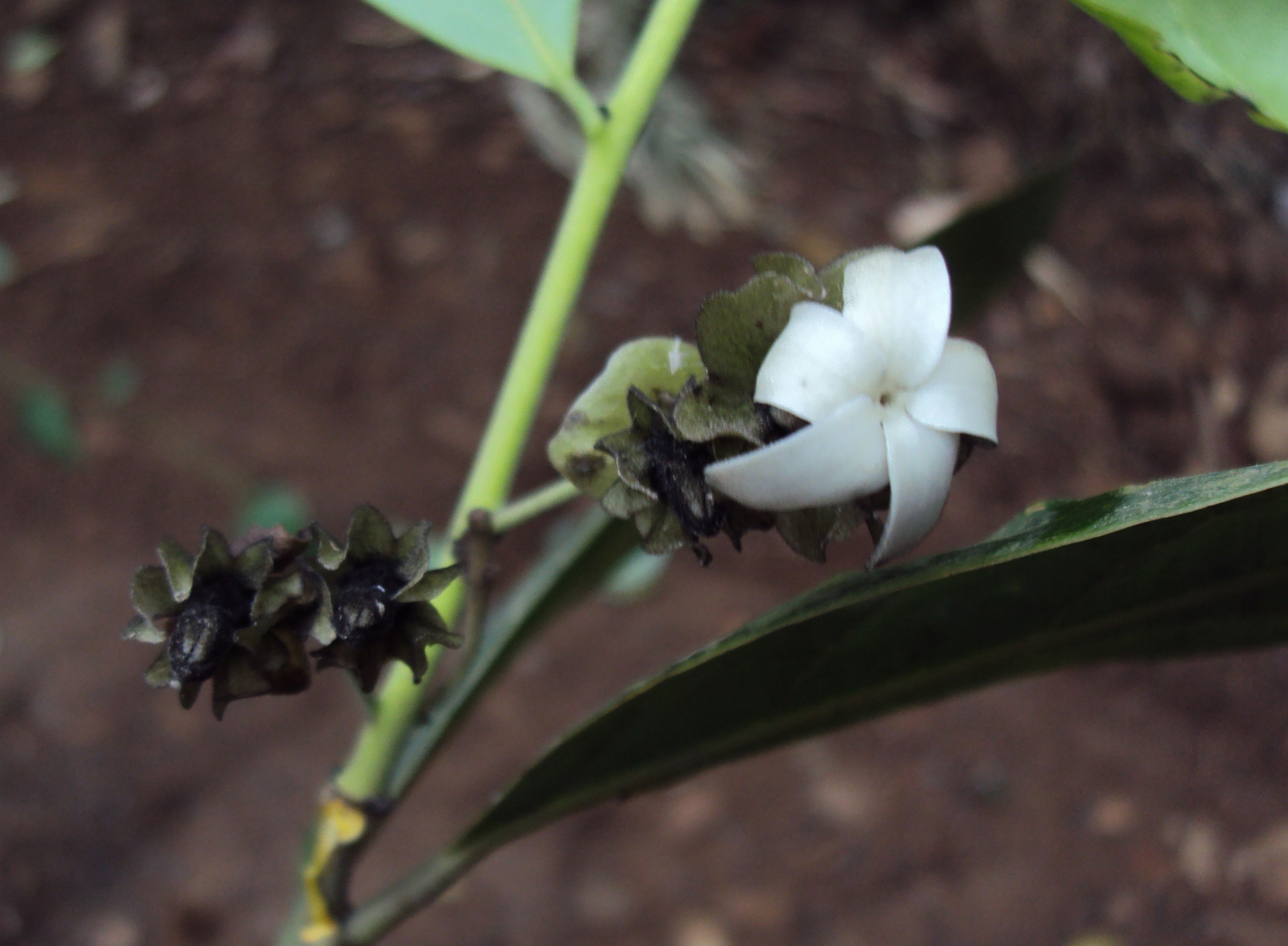
Male flower

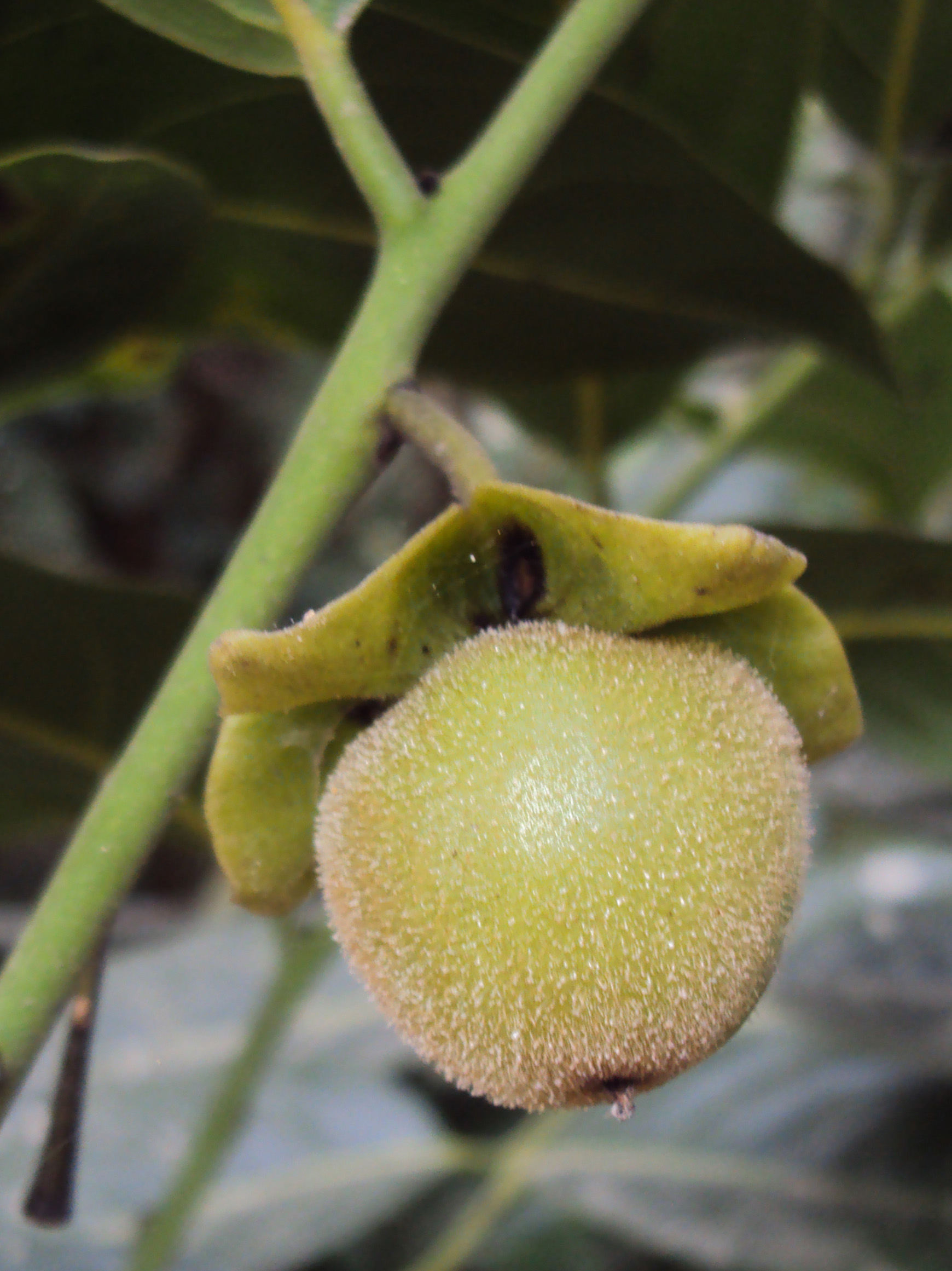
Unripe fruit
