= Diospyros dictyoneura =

Scientific classification
- Kingdom: Plantae
- Clade: Tracheophytes
- Clade: Angiosperms
- Clade: Eudicots
- Clade: Asterids
- Order: Ericales
- Family: Ebenaceae
- Genus: Diospyros
- Species: D. dictyoneura

Binomial name
- Diospyros dictyoneura Hiern

Synonyms
- Diospyros brachiata King & Gamble; Diospyros dictyonema

Species of tree

Diospyros dictyoneura is a tree in the family Ebenaceae. It grows up to 30 metres (100 ft) tall. The fruits are ellipsoid, up to 4.5 cm (2 in) long. The specific epithet dictyoneura is from the Greek meaning 'net of nerves', referring to the leaf veins. Habitat is lowland mixed dipterocarp forests. D. dictyoneura is found from Indochina to west Malesia. In order to grow, the diospyros dictyoneura requires access to the sun. Its leaves are deciduous, and it attracts bees and birds.

== Uses ==
Diospyros dictyoneura's fruits are edible to mammals and birds.
