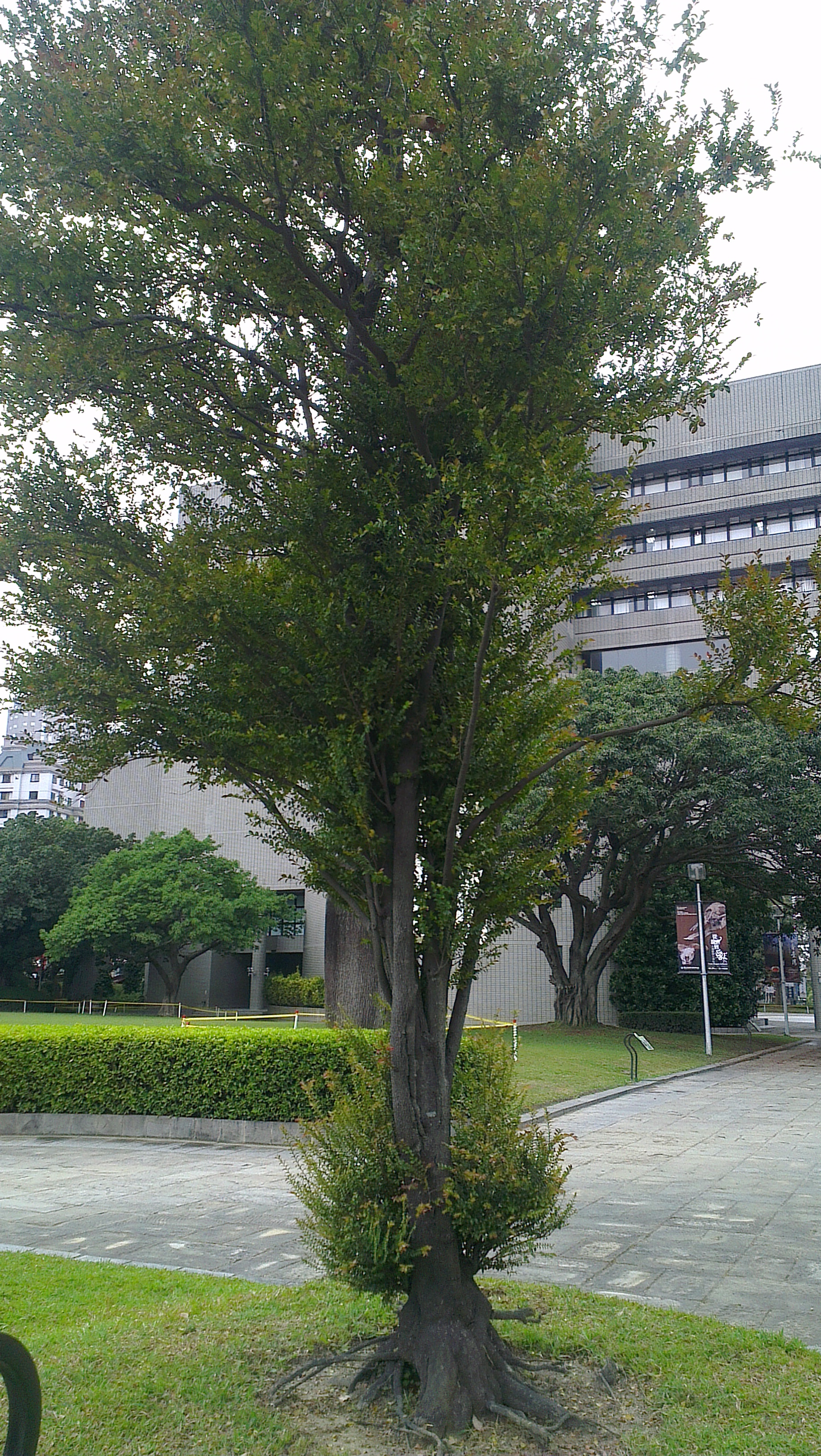

Conservation status
- Critically Endangered (IUCN 2.3)

Scientific classification
- Kingdom: Plantae
- Clade: Tracheophytes
- Clade: Angiosperms
- Clade: Eudicots
- Clade: Asterids
- Order: Ericales
- Family: Ebenaceae
- Genus: Diospyros
- Species: D. vaccinioides

Binomial name
- Diospyros vaccinioides Lindl.

Synonyms
- Rospidios vaccinioides (Lindl.) A.DC.; Vaccinium fragrans Wall. ex Voigt

= Diospyros vaccinioides =

Plant species

Diospyros vaccinioides, the small persimmon, is a herbaceous plant, a member of the family Ebenaceae. This plant is mainly found in China and it is known to thrive in subtropical biomes.

== Description ==
The fruit produced by this plant are classified as berries.

== Distribution ==
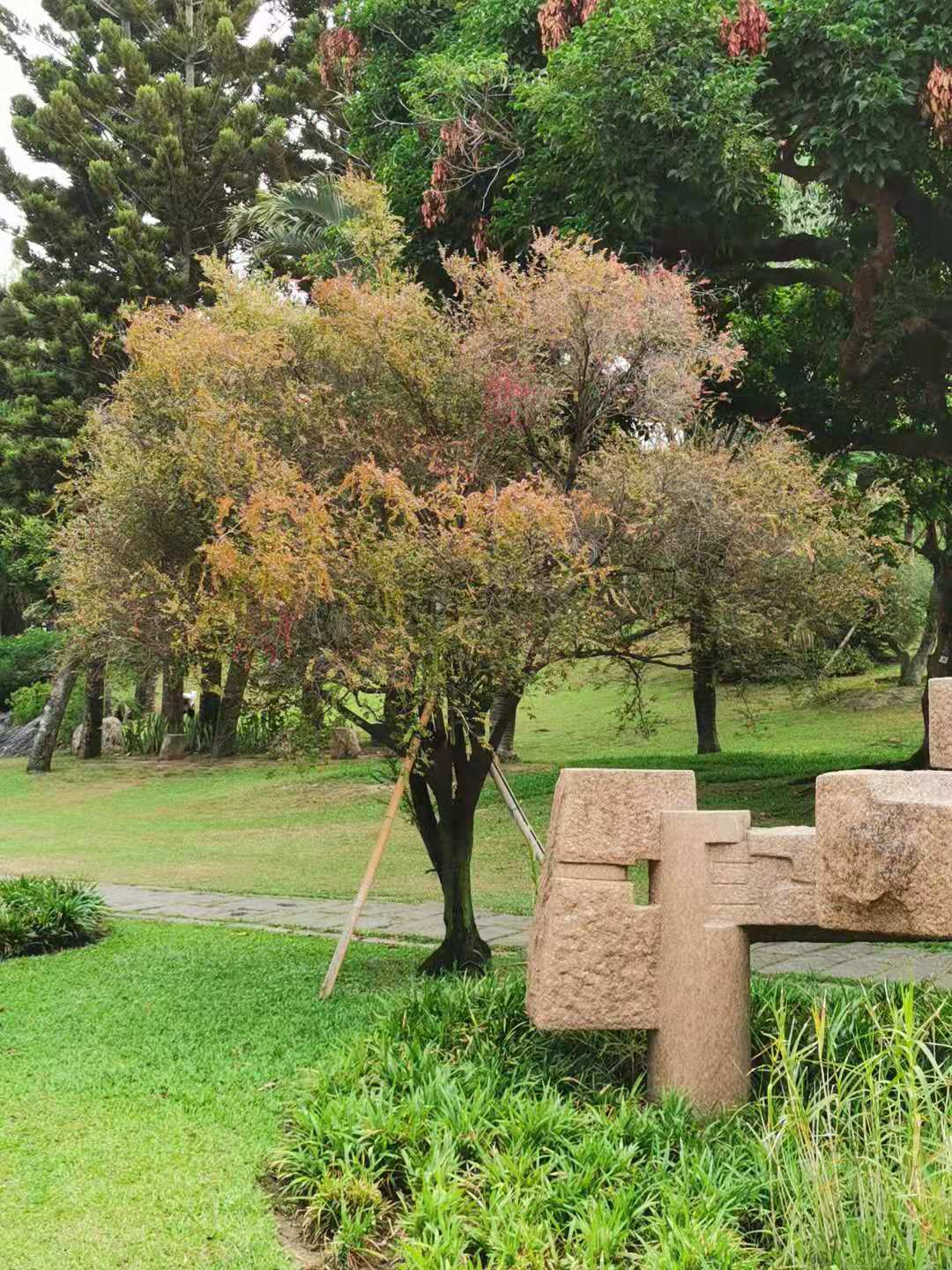
Growth size

It is native to Taiwan. It is also native to China, specifically the Guangdong province, Hongkong, and Hainan.

== Taxonomy ==
It was named by John Lindley, in Exot. Fl. 2: t. 139. in 1825.
