= Diospyros acris =

Conservation status
- Critically Endangered (IUCN 3.1)

Scientific classification
- Kingdom: Plantae
- Clade: Tracheophytes
- Clade: Angiosperms
- Clade: Eudicots
- Clade: Asterids
- Order: Ericales
- Family: Ebenaceae
- Genus: Diospyros
- Species: D. acris

Binomial name
- Diospyros acris Hemsl.

Species of tree

Diospyros acris is a species of tree in the family Ebenaceae. It is endemic to Torres Islands of Vanuatu.
