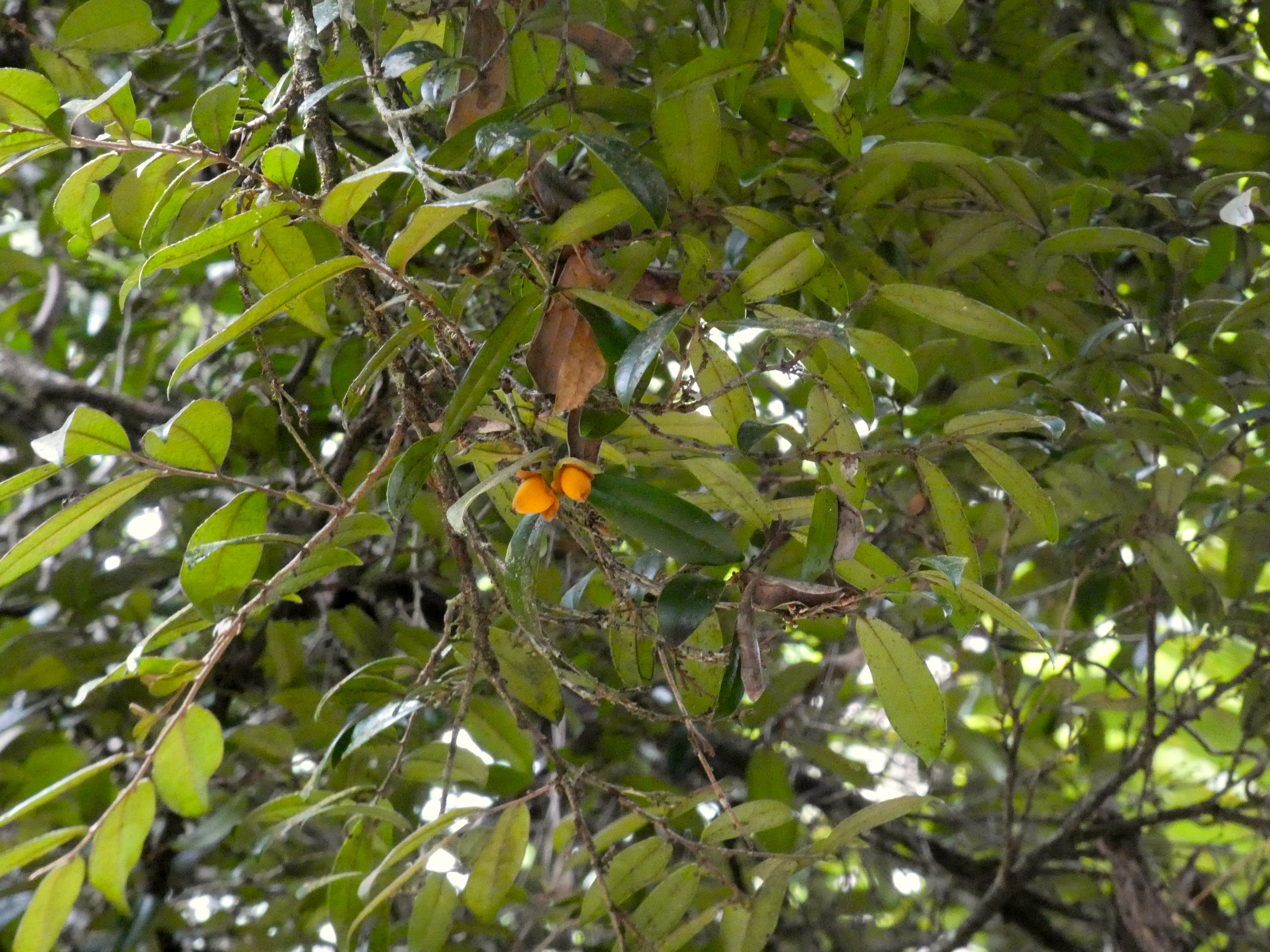
- Foliage and fruit

Conservation status
- Least Concern (IUCN 3.1)

Scientific classification
- Kingdom: Plantae
- Clade: Embryophytes
- Clade: Tracheophytes
- Clade: Spermatophytes
- Clade: Angiosperms
- Clade: Eudicots
- Clade: Asterids
- Order: Ericales
- Family: Ebenaceae
- Genus: Diospyros
- Species: D. laurina

Binomial name
- Diospyros laurina (R.Br.) Jessup

Synonyms
- 7 synonyms: Diospyros ferrea f. laurina (R.Br.) Bakh.; Ebenus laurina (R.Br.) Kuntze; Maba laurina R.Br.; Diospyros cupulosa (F.Muell.) F.Muell.; Diospyros sericocarpa (F.Muell.) F.Muell.; Maba cupulosa F.Muell.; Maba sericocarpa F.Muell.

= Diospyros laurina =

Species of flowering plant

Diospyros laurina, commonly known as brown ebony, is a species of plant in the persimmon family Ebenaceae native to New Guinea and the eastern tropical coast of Queensland, Australia. It is a shrub or small tree that grows in rainforest. It has the conservation status of Least Concern.

== Description ==
Diospyros laurina is a small tree growing up to 20 m (66 ft) tall. Leaves are simple and entire (without divisions, lobes or teeth), and are arranged alternately on the twigs. Flowers occur singly in the leaf axils. The fruit is a three-lobed hairy berry, yellow to reddish, with a large persistent calyx encasing the basal third of the fruit.

This species is dioecious, meaning that pistillate (functionally female) and staminate (functionally male) flowers are borne on separate plants.

== Distribution and habitat ==
It is an understory tree of rainforest and drier forest types, occurring in Papua New Guinea and Queensland. In Queensland its native range is from Shelburne southwards along the east coast to about Mackay. The altitudinal range is from sea level to about 800 m (2,600 ft).

== Conservation status ==
As of May 2026, this species has been assessed to be of least concern by the International Union for Conservation of Nature (IUCN) and by the Queensland Government under its Nature Conservation Act.

== Gallery ==
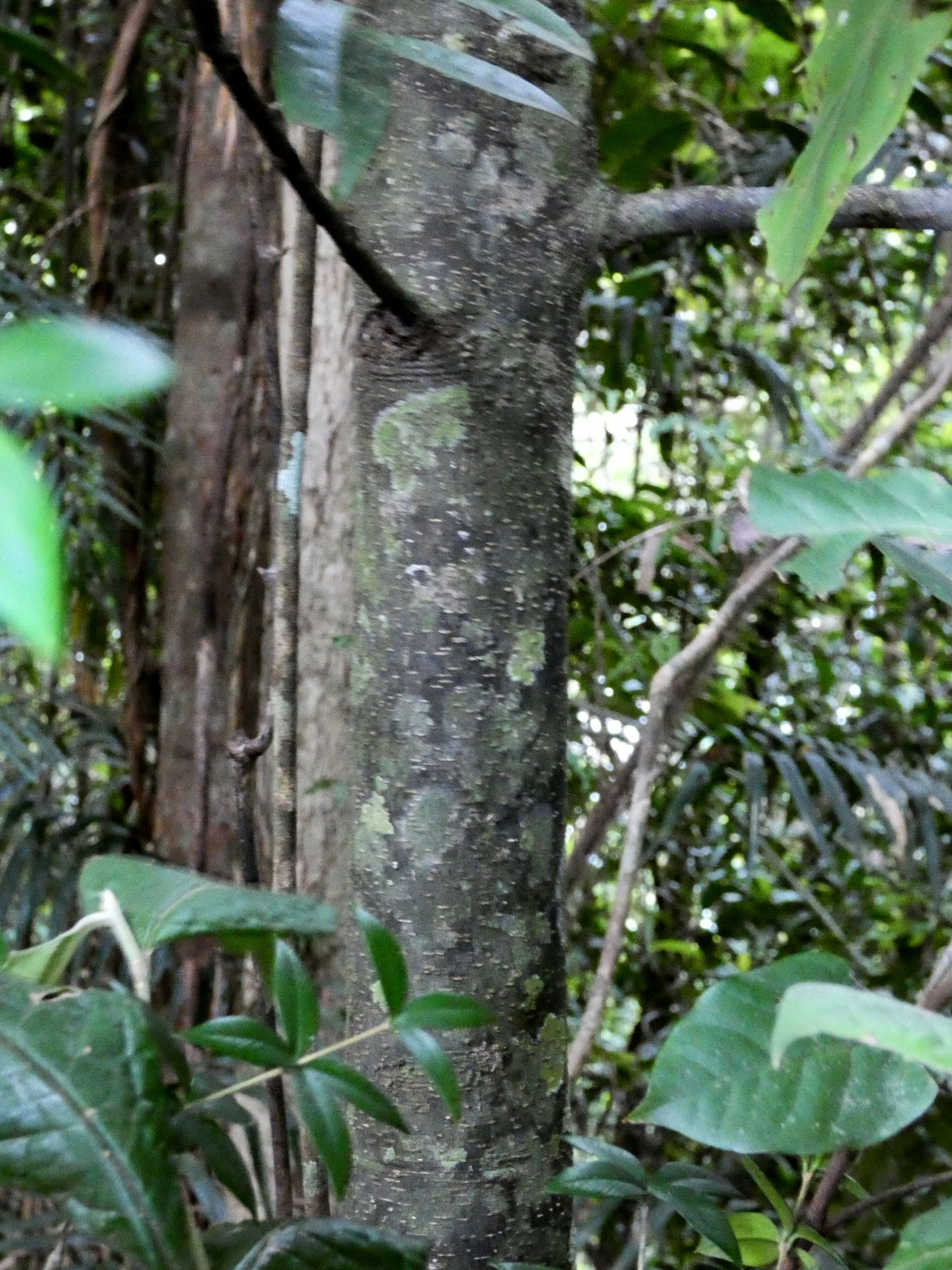
Trunk with dark coloured bark

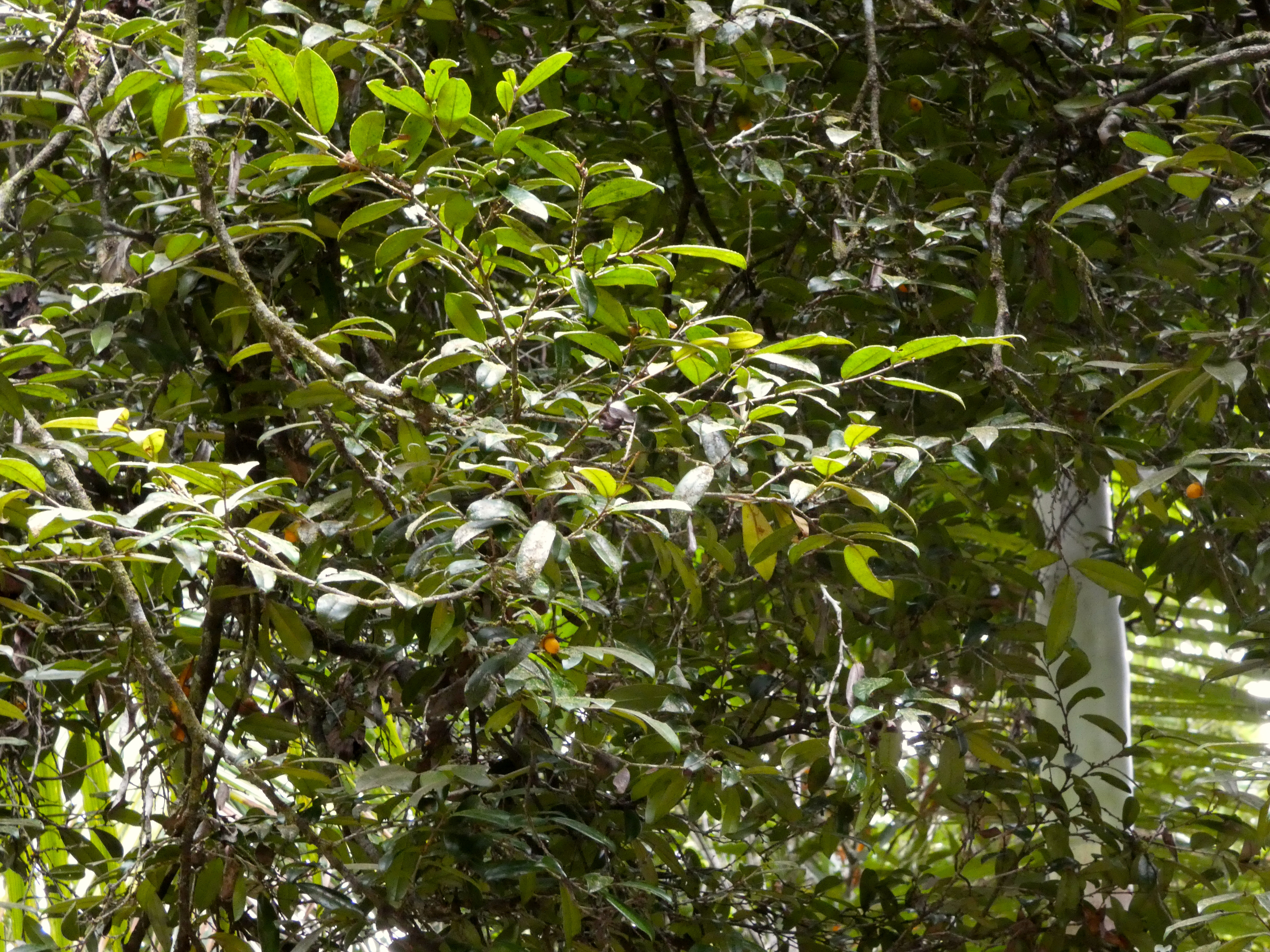
Foliage

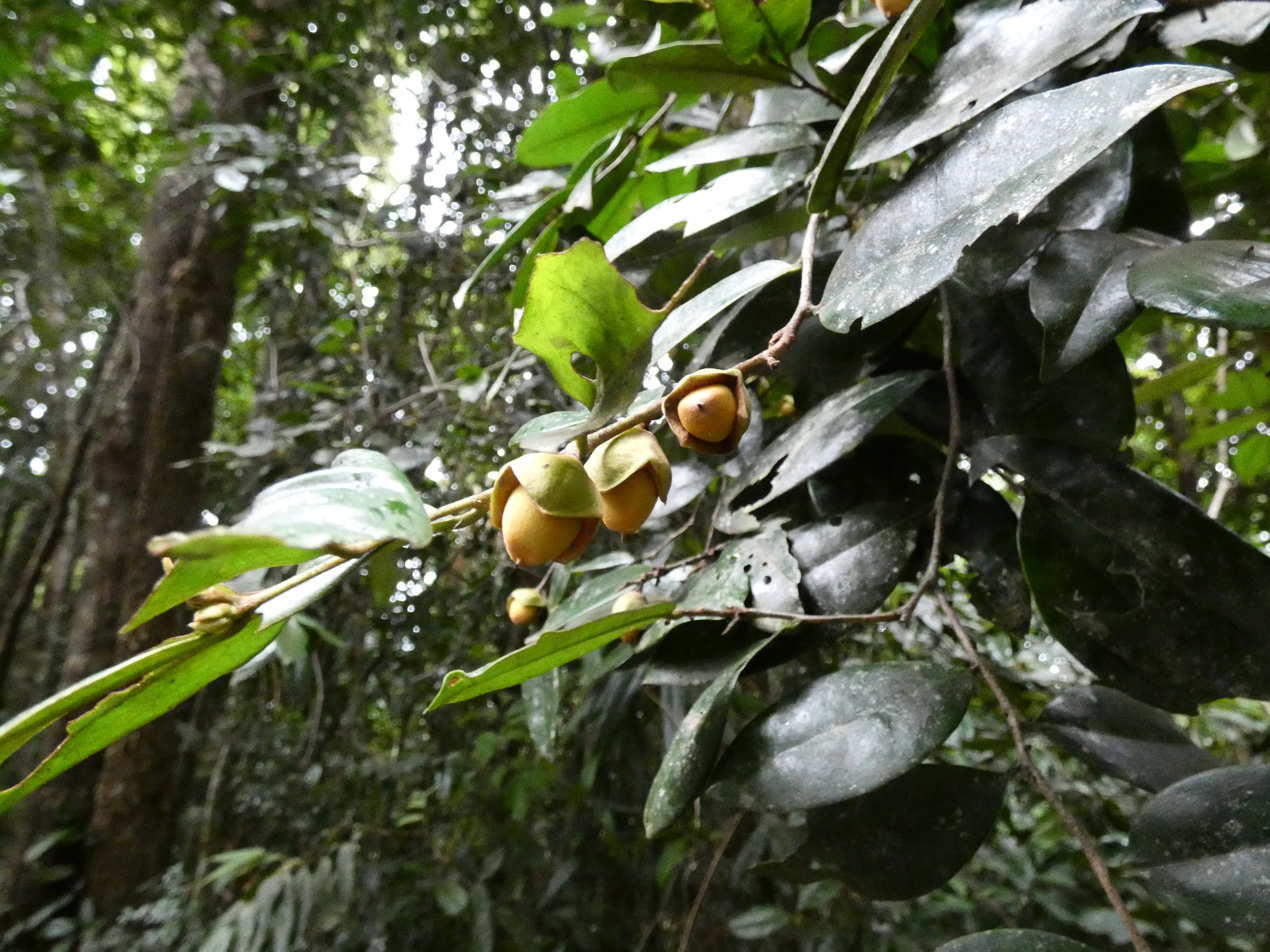
Fruit

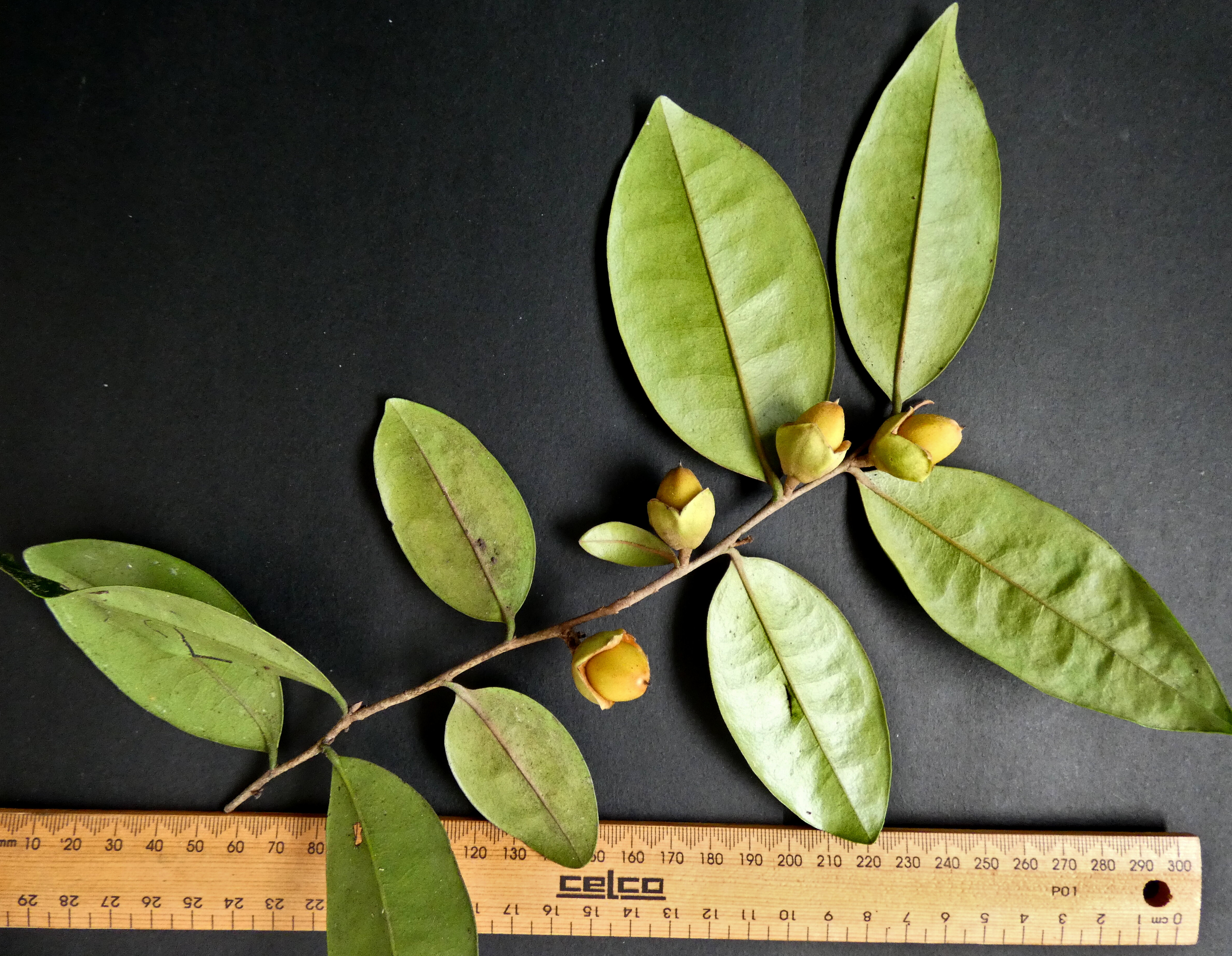
Detail
