= Diospyros toposia =

Conservation status
- Least Concern (IUCN 3.1)

Scientific classification
- Kingdom: Plantae
- Clade: Tracheophytes
- Clade: Angiosperms
- Clade: Eudicots
- Clade: Asterids
- Order: Ericales
- Family: Ebenaceae
- Genus: Diospyros
- Species: D. toposia

Binomial name
- Diospyros toposia Buch.-Ham.

Synonyms
- Diospyros foveoreticulata Merr.; Diospyros racemosa Roxb.; Diospyros toposioides King & Gamble; Embryopteris racemosa (Roxb.) G.Don

Species of flowering plant

Diospyros toposia is a tree in the family Ebenaceae. The specific epithet toposia is from a local name in India, toposí.

== Description ==
Diospyros toposia grows up to 13 metres (43 ft) tall. The leaves are oblong to elliptic and measure up to 34 cm (13 in) long. Male inflorescences may bear up to five flowers.

== Distribution and habitat ==
Diospyros toposia is native to a wide area of tropical Asia, from India to the Lesser Sunda Islands. Its habitat is in lowland tropical rainforests.
