= Diospyros arupaj =

Conservation status
- Data Deficient (IUCN 3.1)

Scientific classification
- Kingdom: Plantae
- Clade: Tracheophytes
- Clade: Angiosperms
- Clade: Eudicots
- Clade: Asterids
- Order: Ericales
- Family: Ebenaceae
- Genus: Diospyros
- Species: D. arupaj

Binomial name
- Diospyros arupaj B.Walln.

Species of plant

Diospyros arupaj is a species of flowering plant in the ebony family Ebenaceae, native to Amazonas, Brazil. A tree reaching 16 m (52 ft), it is found in igapó forests.
