= Diospyros acapulcensis =

Scientific classification
- Kingdom: Plantae
- Clade: Tracheophytes
- Clade: Angiosperms
- Clade: Eudicots
- Clade: Asterids
- Order: Ericales
- Family: Ebenaceae
- Genus: Diospyros
- Species: D. acapulcensis

Binomial name
- Diospyros acapulcensis Kunth

Synonyms
- Ebenus acapulcensis (Kunth) Kuntze; Maba acapulcensis (Kunth) Hiern; Macreightia acapulcensis (Kunth) A.DC.

Species of tree

Diospyros acapulcensis is a species of tree in the family Ebenaceae. It is native to Central America.

== Taxonomy ==
As of February 2024, there are 9 accepted infraspecies described with D. acapulcensis

- Diospyros acapulcensis subsp. acapulcensis: Native to Southern Mexico and Guatemala
- Diospyros acapulcensis subsp. chiquimulensis Provance, I.García & A.C.Sanders: Native to Guatemala
- Diospyros acapulcensis subsp. dwyeri Provance, I.García & A.C.Sanders: Native to Panama
- Diospyros acapulcensis subsp. guanacastensis Provance, I.García & A.C.Sanders: Native to Costa Rica
- Diospyros acapulcensis subsp. mejocotensis Provance, I.García & A.C.Sanders: Native to Honduras
- Diospyros acapulcensis subsp. nicaraguensis (Standl.) Provance, I.García & A.C.Sanders (syn. Diospyros nicaraguensis and Maba nicaraguensis): Native to El Salvador, Guatemala and Nicaragua
- Diospyros acapulcensis subsp. pedromorenoi Provance, I.García & A.C.Sanders: Native to Nicaragua
- Diospyros acapulcensis subsp. rivensis Provance, I.García & A.C.Sanders: Native to Costa Rica and Nicaragua
- Diospyros acapulcensis subsp. verae-crucis (Standl.) Provance, I.García & A.C.Sanders (syn. Diospyros verae-crucis and Maba verae-crucis as well as Maba purpusii): Native to El Salvador, Guatemala and Mexico
