= Diospyros aculeata =

Scientific classification
- Kingdom: Plantae
- Clade: Tracheophytes
- Clade: Angiosperms
- Clade: Eudicots
- Clade: Asterids
- Order: Ericales
- Family: Ebenaceae
- Genus: Diospyros
- Species: D. aculeata

Binomial name
- Diospyros aculeata H.Perrier

Synonyms
- Diospyros aculeata subsp. meridionalis H.Perrier

Species of tree

Diospyros aculeata is a species of tree in the family Ebenaceae. It is endemic to western Madagascar.
