= Diospyros phlebodes =

Scientific classification
- Kingdom: Plantae
- Clade: Tracheophytes
- Clade: Angiosperms
- Clade: Eudicots
- Clade: Asterids
- Order: Ericales
- Family: Ebenaceae
- Genus: Diospyros
- Species: D. phlebodes

Binomial name
- Diospyros phlebodes (A.C.Sm.) A.C.Sm.

Species of tree

Diospyros phlebodes is a species of tree in the family Ebenaceae. It is endemic to Fiji.
