= Diospyros rufa =

Conservation status
- Least Concern (IUCN 2.3)

Scientific classification
- Kingdom: Plantae
- Clade: Tracheophytes
- Clade: Angiosperms
- Clade: Eudicots
- Clade: Asterids
- Order: Ericales
- Family: Ebenaceae
- Genus: Diospyros
- Species: D. rufa

Binomial name
- Diospyros rufa King & Gamble

Synonyms
- Diospyros swingleri Kosterm.

Species of tree

Diospyros rufa is a tree in the family Ebenaceae. It grows up to 30 metres (100 ft) tall. Twigs are reddish when young. Inflorescences bear up to 10 flowers. The fruits are round to ellipsoid, up to 3.5 cm (1 in) in diameter. The specific epithet rufa is from the Latin meaning 'reddish', referring to the indumentum of the young twigs. Habitat is lowland mixed dipterocarp forests. D. rufa is found in Peninsular Malaysia and Borneo.
