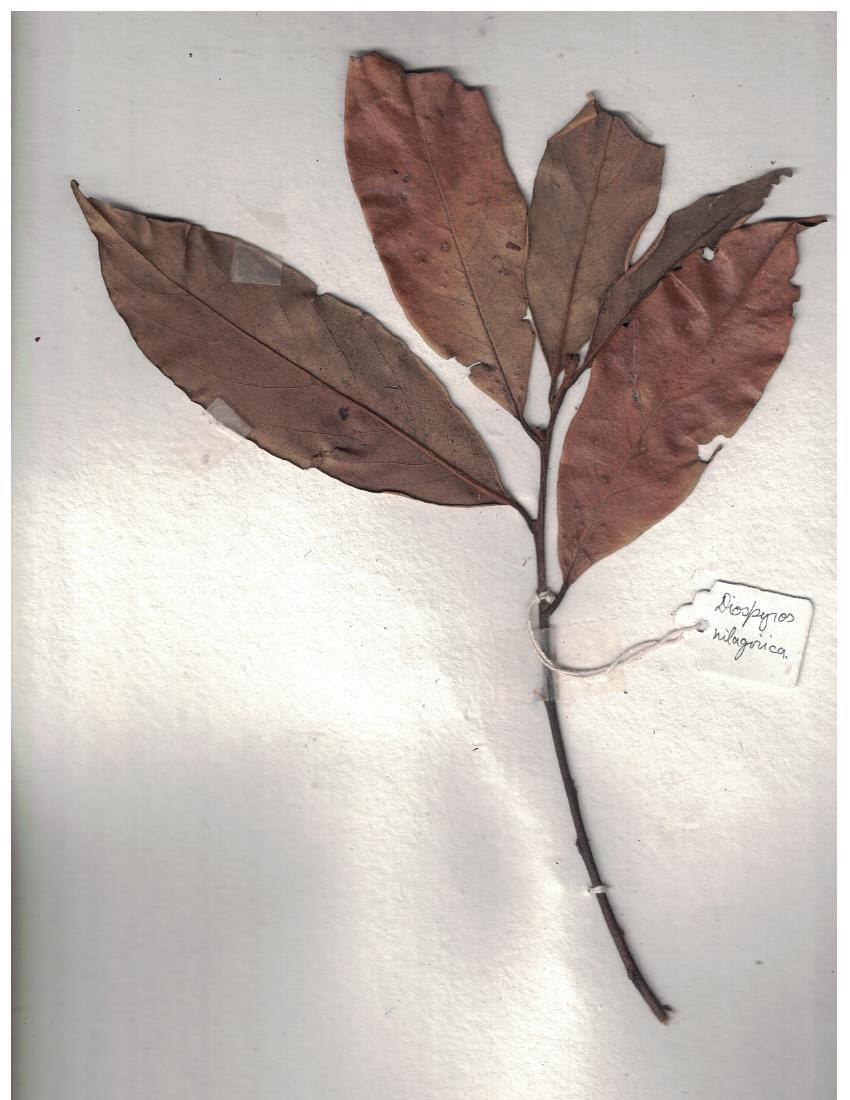
- Diospyros nilagirica herbarium specimen

Scientific classification
- Kingdom: Plantae
- Clade: Embryophytes
- Clade: Tracheophytes
- Clade: Spermatophytes
- Clade: Angiosperms
- Clade: Eudicots
- Clade: Asterids
- Order: Ericales
- Family: Ebenaceae
- Genus: Diospyros
- Species: D. nilagirica

Binomial name
- Diospyros nilagirica Bedd.

= Diospyros nilagirica =

Species of tree

Diospyros nilagirica is an endemic tree species belonging to the family Ebenaceae, found in the wet evergreen forests of the Western Ghats.

== Description ==
This is an evergreen, dioecious tree species that grow up to 18 meters in height. The bark is 10–12 mm thick, black, and smooth, with a yellow blaze. The branchlets, young leaves, and inflorescences are densely covered with rufous tomentose. Leaves are simple, alternate and without stipules. The petiole is 6–12 mm long and glabrous. The lamina is elliptic, oblong-lanceolate, or ovate in shape, with an attenuate base, an acuminate apex, and an entire margin. The leaves are densely rufous tomentose when young, and glabrous when mature.

The flowers are unisexual and yellowish-white, with male flowers arranged in axillary cymes and female flowers solitary and axillary. The berry is globose, up to 2.5 cm in diameter and contains eight smooth seeds.
