= Diospyros sonorae =

Scientific classification
- Kingdom: Plantae
- Clade: Tracheophytes
- Clade: Angiosperms
- Clade: Eudicots
- Clade: Asterids
- Order: Ericales
- Family: Ebenaceae
- Genus: Diospyros
- Species: D. sonorae

Binomial name
- Diospyros sonorae Standl.

Synonyms
- Diospyros sinaloensis S.F.Blake

Species of plant

Diospyros sonorae (syn. Diospyros sinaloensis), the Sonoran persimmon, is a species of flowering plant in the family Ebenaceae, native to Sinaloa and central Sonora, Mexico. A desert-adapted small tree, its fruit is edible and is consumed locally.
