= Reinier Cornelis Bakhuizen van den Brink (born 1881) =

Dutch botanist

Reinier Cornelis Bakhuizen van den Brink (30 January 1881, in Pasoeroean – 4 April 1945, in Tjimahi) was a Dutch botanist. He was the son of Henriëtte Maria Raedt van Oldenbarnevelt (1858–1929) and Charles René Bakhuizen van den Brink (1850–1923), and a grandson of the literary critic, historian and philosopher Reinier Cornelis Bakhuizen van den Brink (1810–1865). In 1917 he married Djahini from Tjimahi, whom he had met in 1910. Their son Reinier Cornelis (1911–1987) was also a botanist. Brink died in a Japanese internment camp during World War II.
