= Diospyros chaetocarpa =

Conservation status
- Vulnerable (IUCN 2.3)

Scientific classification
- Kingdom: Plantae
- Clade: Tracheophytes
- Clade: Angiosperms
- Clade: Eudicots
- Clade: Asterids
- Order: Ericales
- Family: Ebenaceae
- Genus: Diospyros
- Species: D. chaetocarpa

Binomial name
- Diospyros chaetocarpa (Kosterm.)

Species of flowering plant

Diospyros chaetocarpa, is a tree in the ebony family, native to south western parts of Sri Lanka, where it is known as "Kalu Madiriya" in the Sinhala language. The Sinhala name "Kalu Madiriya" is also known to be used for Diospyros oppositifolia.
