= Diospyros daemona =

Conservation status
- Vulnerable (IUCN 2.3)

Scientific classification
- Kingdom: Plantae
- Clade: Tracheophytes
- Clade: Angiosperms
- Clade: Eudicots
- Clade: Asterids
- Order: Ericales
- Family: Ebenaceae
- Genus: Diospyros
- Species: D. daemona

Binomial name
- Diospyros daemona Bakh.

Species of tree

Diospyros daemona is a tree in the family Ebenaceae. It grows up to 20 metres (70 ft) tall. The twigs dry greyish. Inflorescences bear up to 10 flowers. The fruits are roundish, drying black, up to 6 cm (2 in) in diameter. The specific epithet daemona is from the Latin meaning 'demon', referring to the poisonous fruit. D. daemona is found in Sumatra, Peninsular Malaysia and Borneo.
