= Diospyros keningauensis =

Conservation status
- Vulnerable (IUCN 3.1)

Scientific classification
- Kingdom: Plantae
- Clade: Tracheophytes
- Clade: Angiosperms
- Clade: Eudicots
- Clade: Asterids
- Order: Ericales
- Family: Ebenaceae
- Genus: Diospyros
- Species: D. keningauensis

Binomial name
- Diospyros keningauensis Ng

Species of flowering plant

Diospyros keningauensis is a tree in the family Ebenaceae, native to Borneo. It is named for Keningau District in Sabah, a part of its native distribution.

== Description ==
Diospyros keningauensis grows up to 40 metres (130 ft) tall. The papery leaves are ovate to elliptic and measure up to 13 cm (5 in) long. Its inflorescences bear up to five flowers. The fruits are round and measure up to 4.5 cm (2 in) in diameter.

== Distribution and habitat ==
Diospyros keningauensis is endemic to Borneo where it is confined to Sabah (specifically Keningau and Ranau districts). Its habitat is lower montane forest at elevations of 1,300–1,500 m (4,300–4,900 ft).

== Conservation ==
Diospyros keningauensis has been assessed as vulnerable on the IUCN Red List. It is threatened by forest fires and climate change. The species does occur in protected areas.
