= Diospyros discocalyx =

Scientific classification
- Kingdom: Plantae
- Clade: Tracheophytes
- Clade: Angiosperms
- Clade: Eudicots
- Clade: Asterids
- Order: Ericales
- Family: Ebenaceae
- Genus: Diospyros
- Species: D. discocalyx

Binomial name
- Diospyros discocalyx Merr.

Species of tree

Diospyros discocalyx is a large tree in the family Ebenaceae. It grows up to 50 metres (160 ft) tall, with a trunk diameter up to 1 metre (3 ft). The bark is black. Inflorescences bear three or more flowers. The fruits are round, up to 7.5 cm (3 in) in diameter. The specific epithet discocalyx is from the Latin meaning 'disc-shaped calyx'. Habitat is lowland mixed dipterocarp forests, but sometimes found up to 1,600 metres (5,200 ft) altitude. D. discocalyx is endemic to Borneo.
