= Diospyros euphlehia =

Scientific classification
- Kingdom: Plantae
- Clade: Tracheophytes
- Clade: Angiosperms
- Clade: Eudicots
- Clade: Asterids
- Order: Ericales
- Family: Ebenaceae
- Genus: Diospyros
- Species: D. euphlehia

Binomial name
- Diospyros euphlehia Merr.

Species of tree

Diospyros euphlehia is a tree in the family Ebenaceae. It grows up to 13 metres (40 ft) tall. Inflorescences bear up to 15 flowers. The fruits are ovoid, up to 3.5 cm (1 in) long. D. euphlehia is endemic to Borneo.
