= Diospyros ferruginescens =

Scientific classification
- Kingdom: Plantae
- Clade: Tracheophytes
- Clade: Angiosperms
- Clade: Eudicots
- Clade: Asterids
- Order: Ericales
- Family: Ebenaceae
- Genus: Diospyros
- Species: D. ferruginescens

Binomial name
- Diospyros ferruginescens Bakh.

Species of tree

Diospyros ferruginescens is a tree in the family Ebenaceae. It grows up to 36 metres (120 ft) tall. Twigs dry to black. Inflorescences bear up to nine flowers. The fruits are roundish, up to 2.5 cm (1 in) in diameter. The specific epithet ferruginescens is from the Latin meaning 'becoming rusty', referring to the indumentum. Habitat is forests from sea level to 1,500 metres (5,000 ft) altitude. D. ferruginescens is endemic to Borneo.
