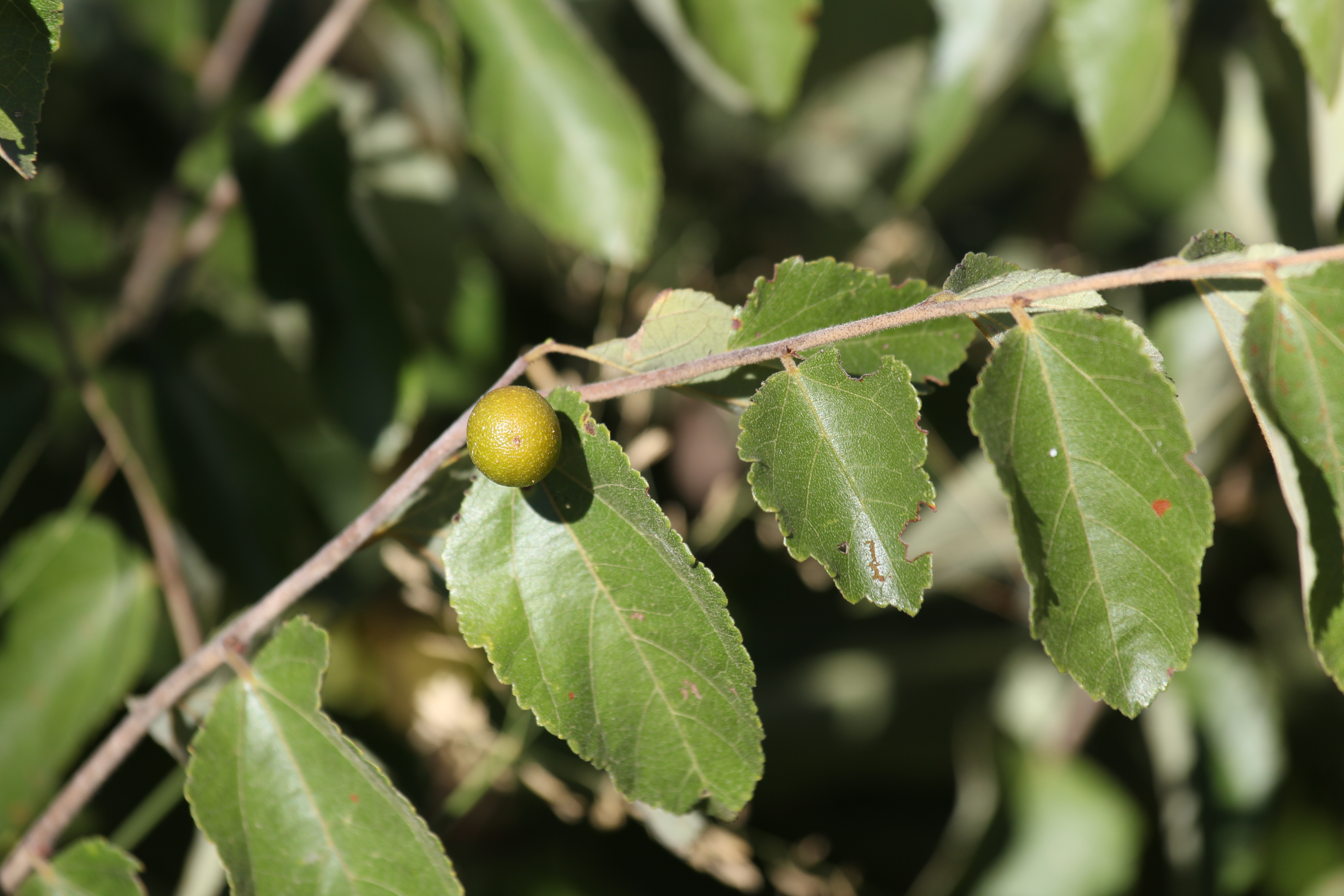

Scientific classification
- Kingdom: Plantae
- Clade: Embryophytes
- Clade: Tracheophytes
- Clade: Angiosperms
- Clade: Eudicots
- Clade: Asterids
- Order: Ericales
- Family: Ebenaceae
- Genus: Diospyros
- Species: D. chamaethamnus

Binomial name
- Diospyros chamaethamnus Mildbr.

= Diospyros chamaethamnus =

Species of fruit and plant

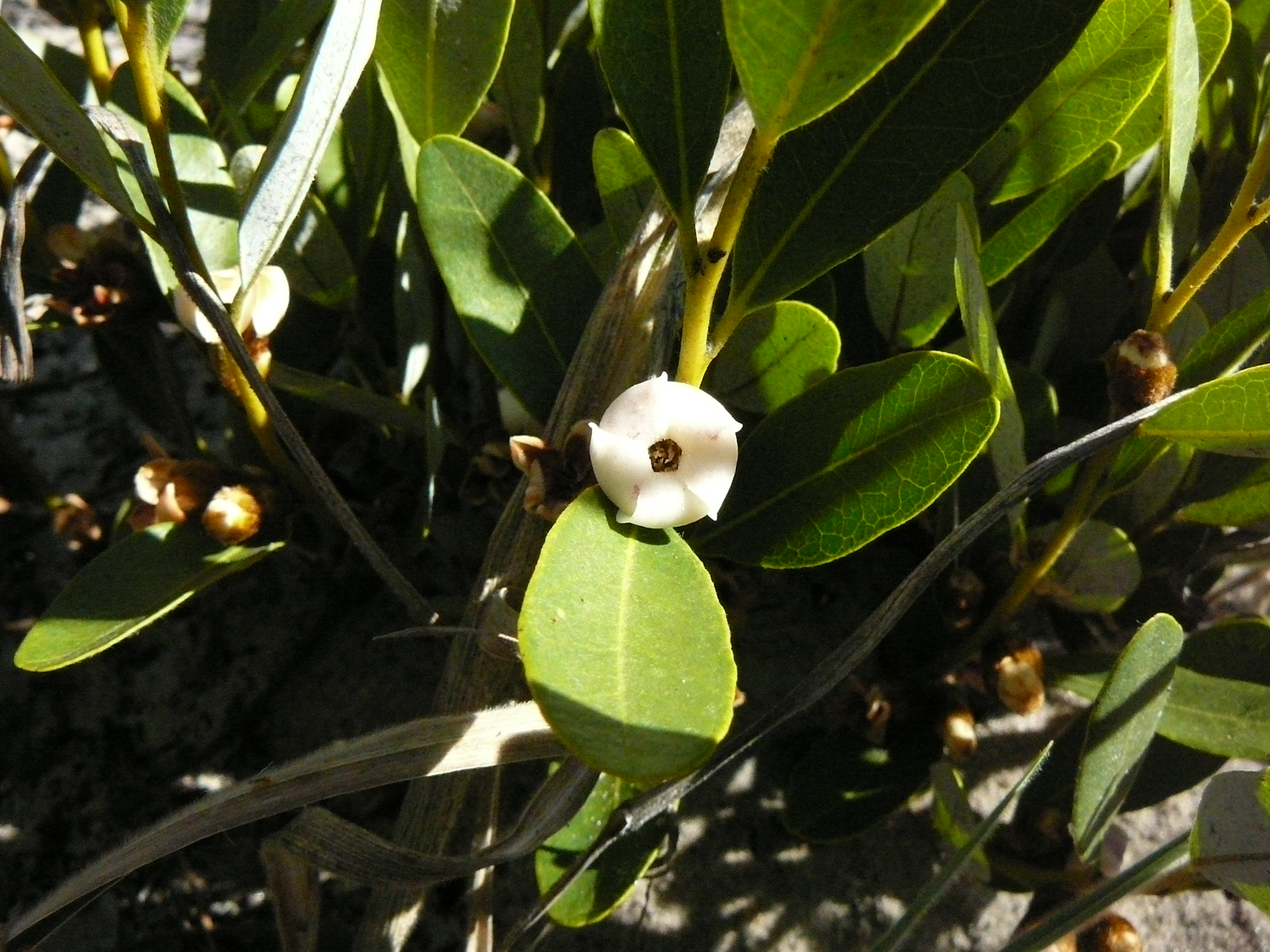
Diospyros chamaethamnus - MHNT

Diospyros chamaethamnus is a species of flowering plant in the family Ebenaceae. It is sometimes referred to by the common name sand apple in English, and is native to Angola, Botswana, the Caprivi Strip, Namibia, and Zambia. It is a relative of persimmons and ebony and like these provides useful wood and edible fruit. It may also have medical properties and some other uses in managing malaria.
