= Diospyros penibukanensis =

Scientific classification
- Kingdom: Plantae
- Clade: Tracheophytes
- Clade: Angiosperms
- Clade: Eudicots
- Clade: Asterids
- Order: Ericales
- Family: Ebenaceae
- Genus: Diospyros
- Species: D. penibukanensis

Binomial name
- Diospyros penibukanensis Bakh.

Species of tree

Diospyros penibukanensis is a tree in the family Ebenaceae. It grows up to 25 metres (80 ft) tall. The twigs are covered with dense hairs. Inflorescences bear up to 10 crowded flowers. The fruits are round, up to 2.5 cm (1 in) in diameter. The tree is named for Penibukan in Malaysia's Sabah state. Its habitat is mixed dipterocarp forests. D. penibukanensis is endemic to Borneo.
