= Diospyros britannoborneensis =

Conservation status
- Near Threatened (IUCN 3.1)

Scientific classification
- Kingdom: Plantae
- Clade: Tracheophytes
- Clade: Angiosperms
- Clade: Eudicots
- Clade: Asterids
- Order: Ericales
- Family: Ebenaceae
- Genus: Diospyros
- Species: D. britannoborneensis

Binomial name
- Diospyros britannoborneensis Bakh.

Species of flowering plant

Diospyros britannoborneensis is a tree in the family Ebenaceae. It is native to Borneo.

== Description ==
Diospyros britannoborneensis grows up to 30 m (100 ft) tall. The twigs dry greyish or blackish. The fruits are ovoid to round, and measure up to 5.5 cm (2.2 in) in diameter.

== Taxonomy ==
Diospyros britannoborneensis was described by Dutch botanist Reinier van den Brink in the Bulletin du Jardin botanique de Buitenzorg (Bulletin of Buitenzorg Botanical Garden) in 1938. The type specimen was collected in Sabah, Borneo. The species is named for the part of northern Borneo formerly known as British Borneo.

== Distribution and habitat ==
Diospyros britannoborneensis is endemic to Borneo, where it is confined to Sabah and Sarawak. Its habitat is in dipterocarp to montane forests from 630–2,000 metres (2,000–7,000 ft) altitude.

== Conservation ==
Diospyros britannoborneensis has been assessed as near threatened on the IUCN Red List. It is threatened by changes in land use, for tourism facilities and for agriculture. The majority of species subpopulations occur in six protected areas in both Sabah and Sarawak.
