= Diospyros beccarioides =

Scientific classification
- Kingdom: Plantae
- Clade: Tracheophytes
- Clade: Angiosperms
- Clade: Eudicots
- Clade: Asterids
- Order: Ericales
- Family: Ebenaceae
- Genus: Diospyros
- Species: D. beccarioides

Binomial name
- Diospyros beccarioides Ng

Species of tree

Diospyros beccarioides is a tree in the family Ebenaceae. It grows up to 20 metres (70 ft) tall. Twigs are reddish brown when young. Inflorescences bear three or more flowers. The fruits are roundish, up to 2.5 cm (1 in) in diameter. The tree is named for its resemblance to Diospyros beccarii, a synonym of Diospyros sumatrana. Habitat is lowland limestone hills from sea level to 200 metres (700 ft) altitude. D. beccarioides is found in Sumatra, Borneo and Sulawesi.
