= Diospyros piscicapa =

Scientific classification
- Kingdom: Plantae
- Clade: Tracheophytes
- Clade: Angiosperms
- Clade: Eudicots
- Clade: Asterids
- Order: Ericales
- Family: Ebenaceae
- Genus: Diospyros
- Species: D. piscicapa

Binomial name
- Diospyros piscicapa Ridl.

Species of tree

Diospyros piscicapa is a tree in the family Ebenaceae. It grows up to 27 metres (90 ft) tall. The twigs are stout and smooth. Male inflorescences feature one to three flowers with a tubular calyx. The fruits are ellipsoid to round, up to 5 cm (2 in) in diameter. The fruit is locally used to stun fish. Habitat is lowland mixed dipterocarp forests from sea level to 700 metres (2,300 ft) altitude. D. piscicapa is endemic to Borneo.
