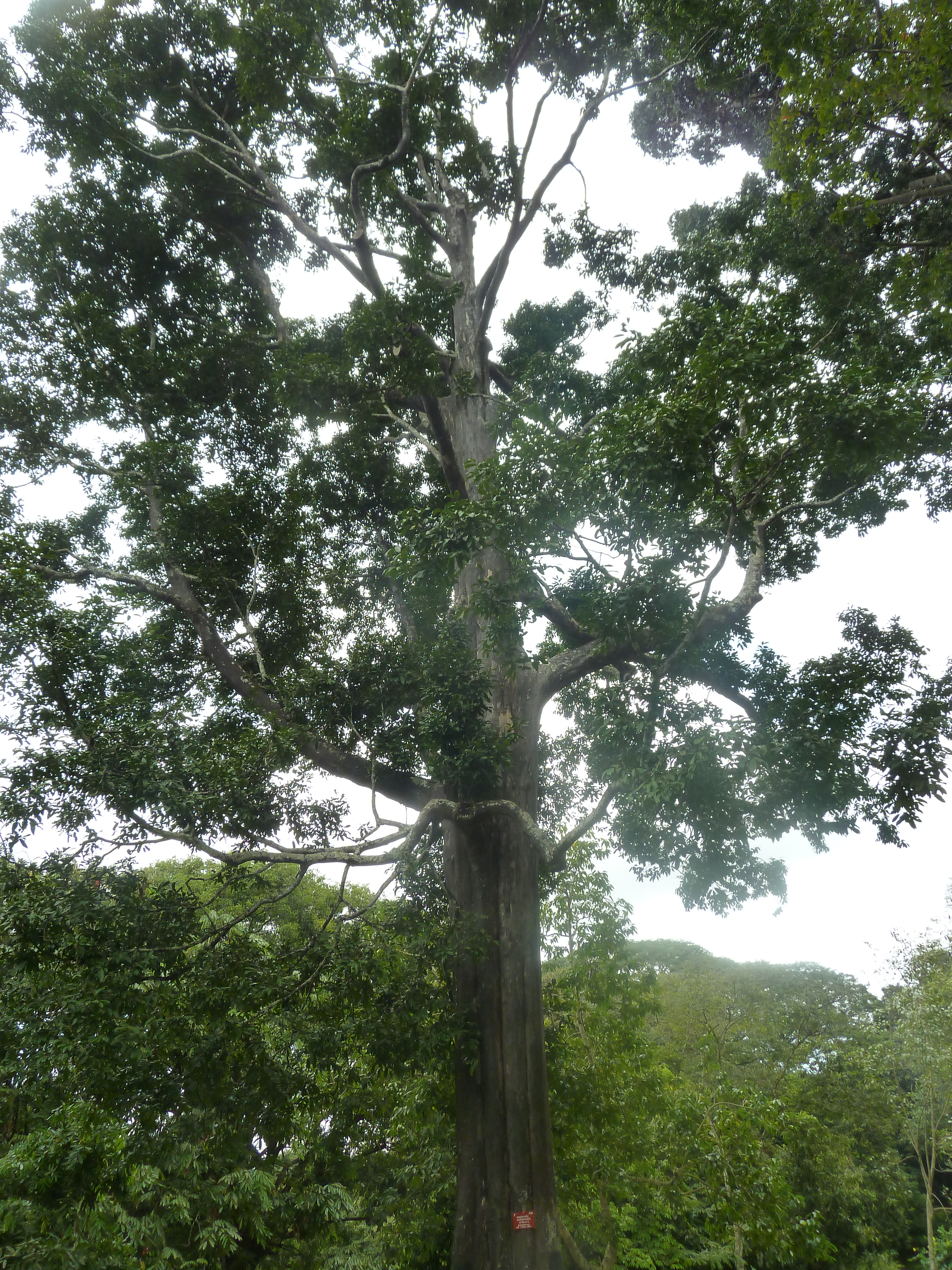

Conservation status
- Vulnerable (IUCN 2.3)

Scientific classification
- Kingdom: Plantae
- Clade: Tracheophytes
- Clade: Angiosperms
- Clade: Eudicots
- Clade: Asterids
- Order: Ericales
- Family: Ebenaceae
- Genus: Diospyros
- Species: D. atrata

Binomial name
- Diospyros atrata (Thw.), Alston

Synonyms
- Diospyros embryopteris Pers.; var. atrata Thw.

= Diospyros atrata =

Species of flowering plant

Diospyros atrata is a tree in the family Ebenaceae. It commonly grows to 25 metres tall. The plant can be seen in subcanopy trees in medium elevation wet evergreen forests between 1000 and 1400 m in Western Ghats- South Sahyadri, Kerala, and Tamil Nadu in India and from Kandy district in Sri Lanka

Common names include "Kalu Kenda" in Sinhala language, and "Gusvakendu" in Tamil.

== Description ==
The trunk of the plant is buttressed, and the bark is smooth, black, and flaky. Young branchlets are terete, yellowish, with apical and axillary buds are black, and hairy. Leaves of D. atrata are simple, alternate, distichous, and petiole is 1-1.5 cm long. Lamina is about 8.5-20 × 3–7 cm. Leaves are elliptic-oblong to elliptic-lanceolate in shape. Apex is acute to acuminate with blunt tip, base is acute to attenuate, coriaceous, glabrous; midrib of the leaf is canaliculate above, stout beneath; secondary nerves usually 5-9 pairs, where lower pairs closer than above ones; tertiary nerves are strongly reticulate on both surfaces.

Fruits of the plant are usually as berries, and are globose, up to 7 cm in diameter, usually rusty brown in color and fruit bear about 8 seeds.
