= Diospyros oligantha =

Scientific classification
- Kingdom: Plantae
- Clade: Tracheophytes
- Clade: Angiosperms
- Clade: Eudicots
- Clade: Asterids
- Order: Ericales
- Family: Ebenaceae
- Genus: Diospyros
- Species: D. oligantha

Binomial name
- Diospyros oligantha Merr.

Species of tree

Diospyros oligantha is a tree in the family Ebenaceae. It grows up to 30 metres (100 ft) tall. Inflorescences bear up to 10 flowers. The fruits are round, up to 1.9 cm (1 in) in diameter. The specific epithet oligantha is from the Greek meaning 'few-flowered', referring to the inflorescences. D. oligantha is endemic to Borneo.
