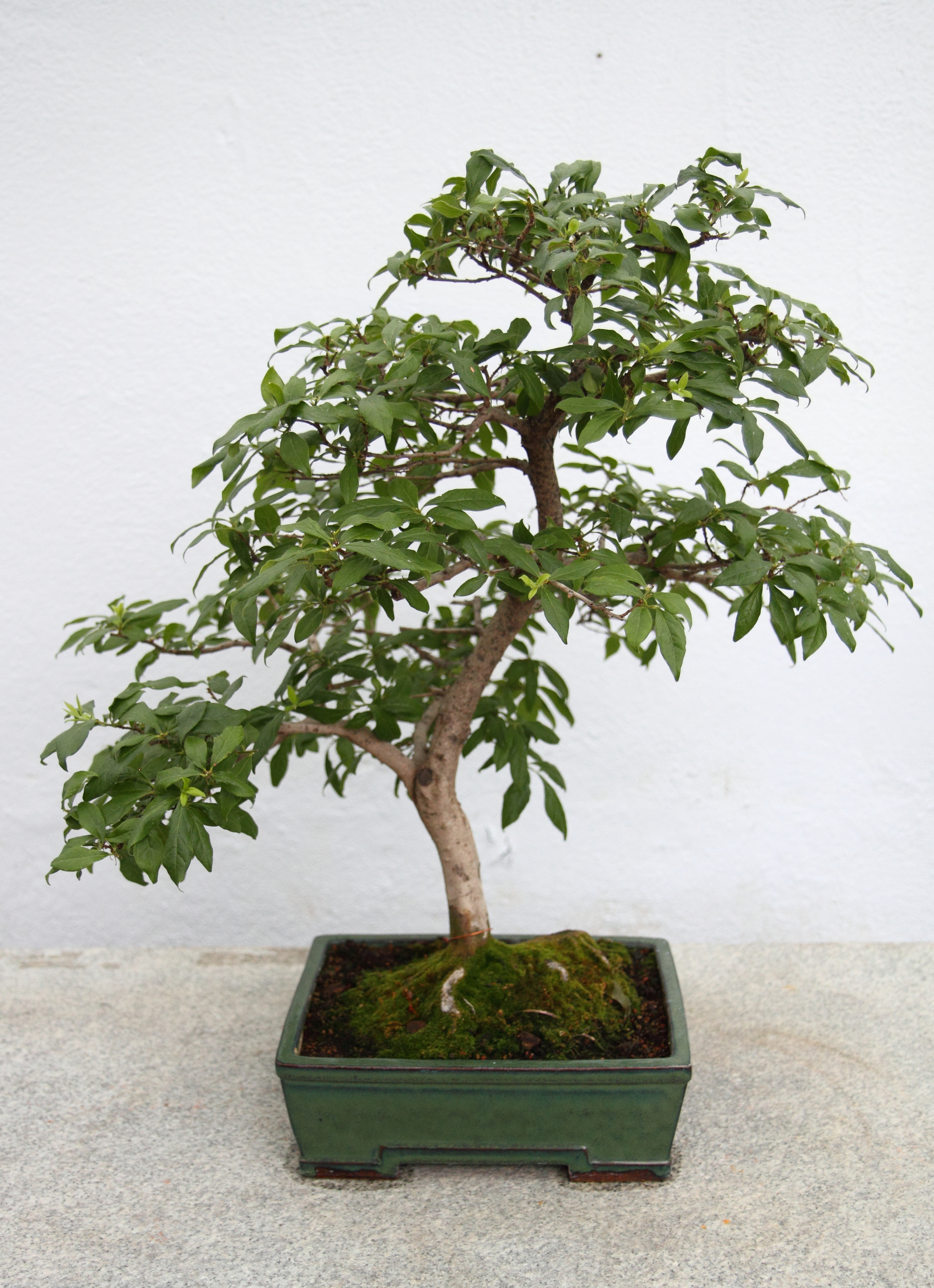
- Bonsai specimen
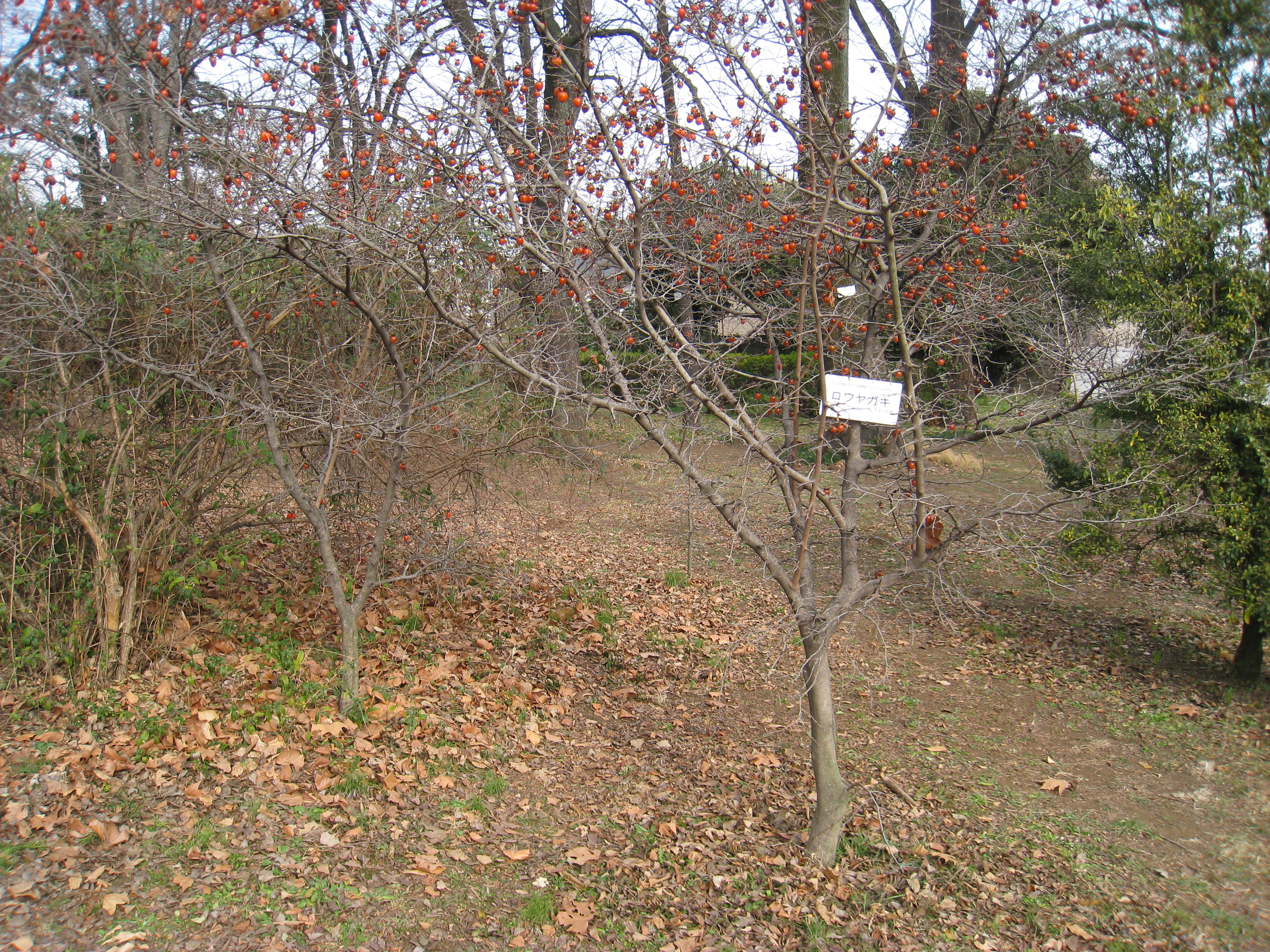
- At Koishikawa Botanical Garden

Conservation status
- Least Concern (IUCN 3.1)

Scientific classification
- Kingdom: Plantae
- Clade: Embryophytes
- Clade: Tracheophytes
- Clade: Spermatophytes
- Clade: Angiosperms
- Clade: Eudicots
- Clade: Asterids
- Order: Ericales
- Family: Ebenaceae
- Genus: Diospyros
- Species: D. rhombifolia

Binomial name
- Diospyros rhombifolia Hemsl.

= Diospyros rhombifolia =

Species of flowering plant

Diospyros rhombifolia, the diamond-leaf persimmon or princess persimmon, is a species of flowering plant in the family Ebenaceae. It is native to southeast China. A shrub or tree reaching 8 m (26 ft), and hardy to USDA zone 7b, it is widely cultivated as an ornamental for its small leaves and attractive orange fruit.
