= Diospyros attenuata =

Conservation status
- Endangered (IUCN 2.3)

Scientific classification
- Kingdom: Plantae
- Clade: Tracheophytes
- Clade: Angiosperms
- Clade: Eudicots
- Clade: Asterids
- Order: Ericales
- Family: Ebenaceae
- Genus: Diospyros
- Species: D. attenuata

Binomial name
- Diospyros attenuata (Thw.)

Species of tree

Diospyros attenuata is a species of tree in the ebony family, Ebenaceae. It is endemic to Sri Lanka. This tree has been found to occur in only three forest reserves during the extensive National Conservation Review forest surveys.
