= Diospyros puncticulosa =

Scientific classification
- Kingdom: Plantae
- Clade: Tracheophytes
- Clade: Angiosperms
- Clade: Eudicots
- Clade: Asterids
- Order: Ericales
- Family: Ebenaceae
- Genus: Diospyros
- Species: D. puncticulosa

Binomial name
- Diospyros puncticulosa Bakh.

Synonyms
- Maba beccarii Hiern

Species of tree

Diospyros puncticulosa is a tree in the family Ebenaceae. It grows up to 30 metres (100 ft) tall. The twigs dry to black. The fruits are ovoid, up to 6 cm (2 in) long. The specific epithet puncticulosa is from the Latin meaning 'minutely dotted', referring to the fruits. Habitat is lowland mixed dipterocarp forests from sea-level to 400 metres (1,000 ft) altitude. D. puncticulosa is endemic to Borneo.
