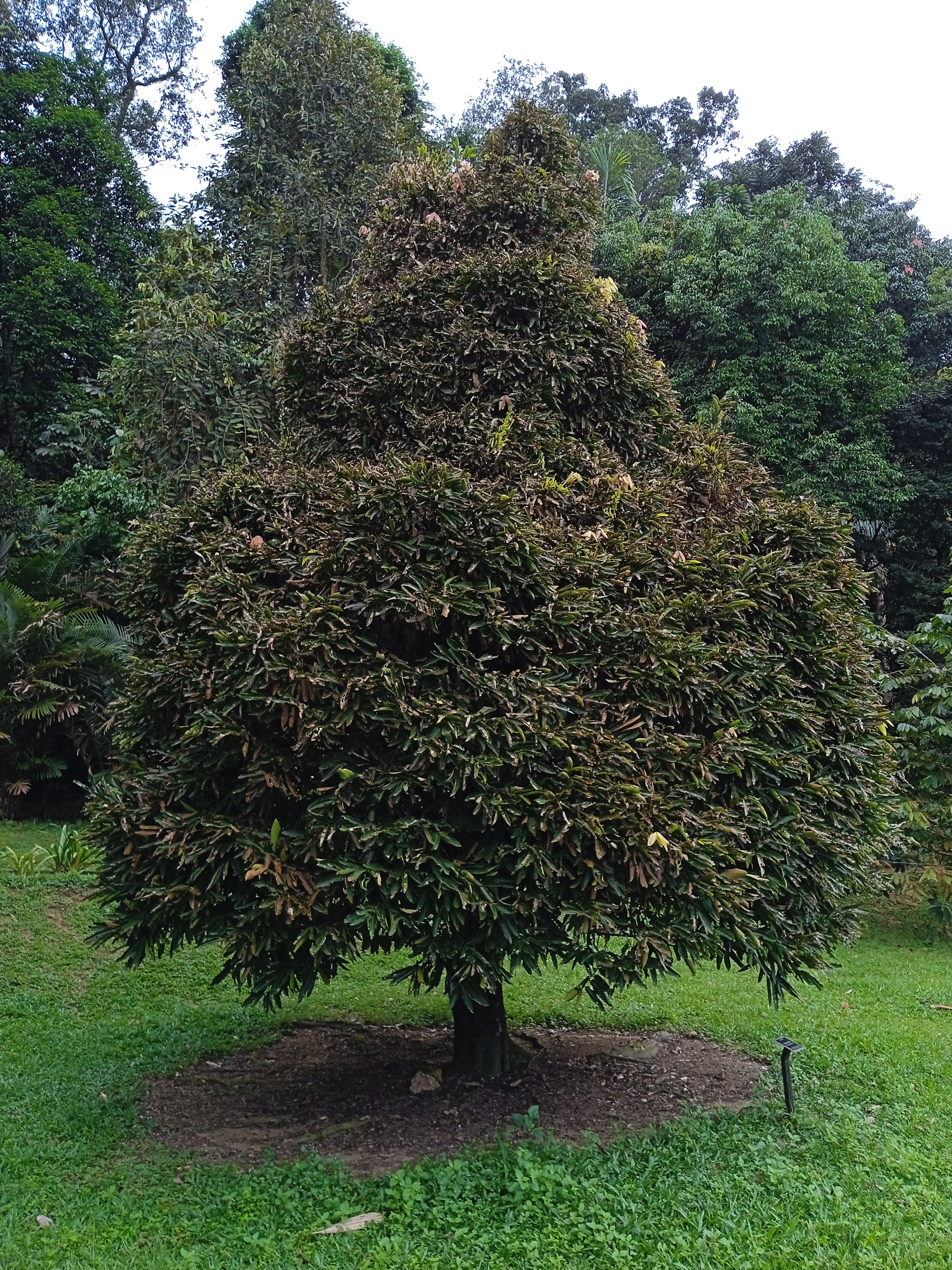
- At Kepong Botanical Garden, Kuala Lumpur

Conservation status
- Least Concern (IUCN 3.1)

Scientific classification
- Kingdom: Plantae
- Clade: Tracheophytes
- Clade: Angiosperms
- Clade: Eudicots
- Clade: Asterids
- Order: Ericales
- Family: Ebenaceae
- Genus: Diospyros
- Species: D. diepenhorstii

Binomial name
- Diospyros diepenhorstii Miq.

Synonyms
- Diospyros copelandii Merr.; Diospyros juppii Merr.; Diospyros pyrifera Ridl.

= Diospyros diepenhorstii =

Species of flowering plant

Diospyros diepenhorstii is a tree in the family Ebenaceae. It is native to Southeast Asia.

== Description ==
Diospyros diepenhorstii grows up to 30 m (100 ft) tall. The twigs are brownish to blackish. The leaves are oblong and measure up to 50 cm (20 in) long and 14 cm (5.5 in) wide. The fruits are obovoid to oblong-ellipsoid, measuring up to 10 cm (4 in) long. Bornean orangutans eat the leaves.

== Taxonomy ==
Diospyros diepenhorstii was described by Dutch botanist Friedrich Anton Wilhelm Miquel in Flora van Nederlandsch Indie (Flora of the Dutch East Indies) in 1861. The type specimen was collected in the area of Pariaman in Sumatra. The species is named after Dutch botanist H. Diepenhorst.

== Distribution and habitat ==
Diospyros diepenhorstii is found in Peninsular Thailand and Peninsular Malaysia and from Sumatra east to the Philippines. Its habitat is in lowland dipterocarp to montane forests from sea level to 1,800 m (6,000 ft) altitude.

== Conservation ==
Diospyros diepenhorstii has been assessed as least concern on the IUCN Red List. The population is considered stable.
