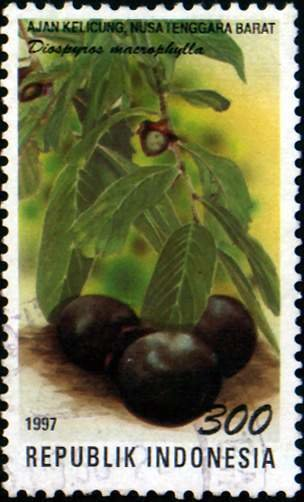
- 1997 stamp of Indonesia

Conservation status
- Least Concern (IUCN 3.1)

Scientific classification
- Kingdom: Plantae
- Clade: Tracheophytes
- Clade: Angiosperms
- Clade: Eudicots
- Clade: Asterids
- Order: Ericales
- Family: Ebenaceae
- Genus: Diospyros
- Species: D. macrophylla

Binomial name
- Diospyros macrophylla Blume

Synonyms
- Diospyros cystopus Miq.; Diospyros pachycalyx Merr.; Diospyros phyllomegas Steud.; Diospyros suluensis Merr.

= Diospyros macrophylla =

Species of tree

Diospyros macrophylla is a tree in the family Ebenaceae. The specific epithet macrophylla means 'large-leafed'.

== Description ==
Diospyros macrophylla grows up to 30 metres (100 ft) tall. The inflorescences bear up to 20 flowers. Its fruits are round to oblong, up to 6.5 cm (3 in) in diameter.

== Distribution and habitat ==
Diospyros macrophylla is native to Sumatra, Java, Borneo, Sulawesi and the Philippines. Its habitat is in mixed dipterocarp forests from sea level to 1,000 metres (3,300 ft) altitude.
