= Diospyros artanthifolia =

Conservation status
- Least Concern (IUCN 3.1)

Scientific classification
- Kingdom: Plantae
- Clade: Tracheophytes
- Clade: Angiosperms
- Clade: Eudicots
- Clade: Asterids
- Order: Ericales
- Family: Ebenaceae
- Genus: Diospyros
- Species: D. artanthifolia

Binomial name
- Diospyros artanthifolia Mart. ex Miq.

Species of flowering plant

Diospyros artanthifolia is a species of tree in the family Ebenaceae. It is native to Panama and tropical South America.
