= Diospyros crockerensis =

Conservation status
- Endangered (IUCN 3.1)

Scientific classification
- Kingdom: Plantae
- Clade: Tracheophytes
- Clade: Angiosperms
- Clade: Eudicots
- Clade: Asterids
- Order: Ericales
- Family: Ebenaceae
- Genus: Diospyros
- Species: D. crockerensis

Binomial name
- Diospyros crockerensis Ng

Species of flowering plant

Diospyros crockerensis is a tree in the family Ebenaceae. It is named for the Crocker Range in Malaysia's Sabah state.

== Description ==
Diospyros crockerensis grows up to 11 metres (40 ft) tall. The inflorescences bear up to nine flowers. The fruits are oblong to ovoid, up to 3.5 cm (1 in) long.

== Distribution and habitat ==
Diospyros crockerensis is endemic to Borneo. Its habitat is in hill mixed dipterocarp forests.

== Conservation ==
Diospyros crockerensis has been assessed as endangered on the IUCN Red List. It is threatened by logging and conversion of land for plantations. The species is in one protected area, Sungai Rayoh Forest Reserve in Sabah.
