= Diospyros thwaitesii =

Conservation status
- Vulnerable (IUCN 2.3)

Scientific classification
- Kingdom: Plantae
- Clade: Tracheophytes
- Clade: Angiosperms
- Clade: Eudicots
- Clade: Asterids
- Order: Ericales
- Family: Ebenaceae
- Genus: Diospyros
- Species: D. thwaitesii

Binomial name
- Diospyros thwaitesii (Hiern.) Bedd.

Synonyms
- Diospyros candolleana Thwaites; Diospyros hirsuta var. thwaitesii Hiern

Species of flowering plant

Diospyros thwaitesii is a tree in the family Ebenaceae. It is endemic to Sri Lanka.
