= Diospyros lunduensis =

Scientific classification
- Kingdom: Plantae
- Clade: Tracheophytes
- Clade: Angiosperms
- Clade: Eudicots
- Clade: Asterids
- Order: Ericales
- Family: Ebenaceae
- Genus: Diospyros
- Species: D. lunduensis

Binomial name
- Diospyros lunduensis Ng

Species of tree

Diospyros lunduensis is a tree in the family Ebenaceae. It grows up to 25 metres (80 ft) tall. The fruits are round, up to 2 cm (1 in) in diameter. The tree is named for Lundu in Malaysia's Sarawak state. D. lunduensis is endemic to Borneo.
