= Diospyros foxworthyi =

Conservation status
- Least Concern (IUCN 2.3)

Scientific classification
- Kingdom: Plantae
- Clade: Tracheophytes
- Clade: Angiosperms
- Clade: Eudicots
- Clade: Asterids
- Order: Ericales
- Family: Ebenaceae
- Genus: Diospyros
- Species: D. foxworthyi

Binomial name
- Diospyros foxworthyi Bakh.

Synonyms
- Diospyros cylindrocarpa Kosterm.; Diospyros laevigata Bakh.

Species of tree

Diospyros foxworthyi is a tree in the family Ebenaceae. It grows up to 20 metres (70 ft) tall. Inflorescences bear up to 15 flowers. The fruits are roundish to oblong, up to 5 cm (2 in) in diameter. The tree is named for the American botanist F. W. Foxworthy. Habitat is lowland mixed dipterocarp forests. D. foxworthyi is found in Peninsular Malaysia and Borneo.
