= Diospyros singaporensis =

Conservation status
- Least Concern (IUCN 2.3)

Scientific classification
- Kingdom: Plantae
- Clade: Tracheophytes
- Clade: Angiosperms
- Clade: Eudicots
- Clade: Asterids
- Order: Ericales
- Family: Ebenaceae
- Genus: Diospyros
- Species: D. singaporensis

Binomial name
- Diospyros singaporensis Bakh.

Species of tree

Diospyros singaporensis is a tree in the family Ebenaceae. It grows up to 28 metres (90 ft) tall. Inflorescences bear up to three flowers. The fruits are round, shiny black, up to 3.5 cm (1 in) long. The tree is named after Singapore. Habitat is lowland mixed dipterocarp forests. D. singaporensis is found in Peninsular Malaysia and Borneo.
