= Diospyros mindanaensis =

Scientific classification
- Kingdom: Plantae
- Clade: Tracheophytes
- Clade: Angiosperms
- Clade: Eudicots
- Clade: Asterids
- Order: Ericales
- Family: Ebenaceae
- Genus: Diospyros
- Species: D. mindanaensis

Binomial name
- Diospyros mindanaensis Merr.

Synonyms
- Diospyros endertii Bakh.; Diospyros rosenbluthii Elmer

Species of tree

Diospyros mindanaensis is a tree in the family Ebenaceae. It grows up to 27 metres (90 ft) tall. Inflorescences bear up to three flowers. The fruits are round to ovoid, up to 7.5 cm (3 in) in diameter. The tree is named for the Philippines island of Mindanao. D. mindanaensis is found in Borneo and the Philippines.
