= Diospyros rigida =

Scientific classification
- Kingdom: Plantae
- Clade: Tracheophytes
- Clade: Angiosperms
- Clade: Eudicots
- Clade: Asterids
- Order: Ericales
- Family: Ebenaceae
- Genus: Diospyros
- Species: D. rigida

Binomial name
- Diospyros rigida Hiern

Synonyms
- Diospyros subrigida Hochr.

Species of tree

Diospyros rigida is a tree in the family Ebenaceae. It grows up to 26 metres (90 ft) tall. The twigs are greyish black. The fruits are round, up to 4.5 cm (2 in) long. The specific epithet rigida is from the Latin meaning 'stiff or rigid', referring to the leaves. Habitat is lowland mixed dipterocarp forests. D. rigida is found in Sumatra, Peninsular Malaysia and Borneo.
