= Diospyros siamang =

Scientific classification
- Kingdom: Plantae
- Clade: Tracheophytes
- Clade: Angiosperms
- Clade: Eudicots
- Clade: Asterids
- Order: Ericales
- Family: Ebenaceae
- Genus: Diospyros
- Species: D. siamang

Binomial name
- Diospyros siamang Bakh.

Species of tree

Diospyros siamang is a small tree in the family Ebenaceae. Inflorescences are about 1 cm (0.4 in) long and bear several flowers. The fruits are urn-shaped, up to 3.8 cm (1 in) long. The tree is named after its Sumatran name. Habitat is peat swamp forests. D. siamang is found in Sumatra, Peninsular Malaysia and Borneo.
