= Diospyros subtruncata =

Scientific classification
- Kingdom: Plantae
- Clade: Tracheophytes
- Clade: Angiosperms
- Clade: Eudicots
- Clade: Asterids
- Order: Ericales
- Family: Ebenaceae
- Genus: Diospyros
- Species: D. subtruncata

Binomial name
- Diospyros subtruncata Hochr.

Species of tree

Diospyros subtruncata is a tree in the family Ebenaceae. It grows up to 22 metres (70 ft) tall. Inflorescences bear up to three flowers. The fruits are obovoid, up to 3 cm (1 in) long. The specific epithet subtruncata is from the Latin meaning 'somewhat truncated', referring to the calyx. Habitat is lowland mixed dipterocarp forests from sea level to 400 metres (1,300 ft) altitude. D. subtruncata is found in Sumatra and Borneo.
