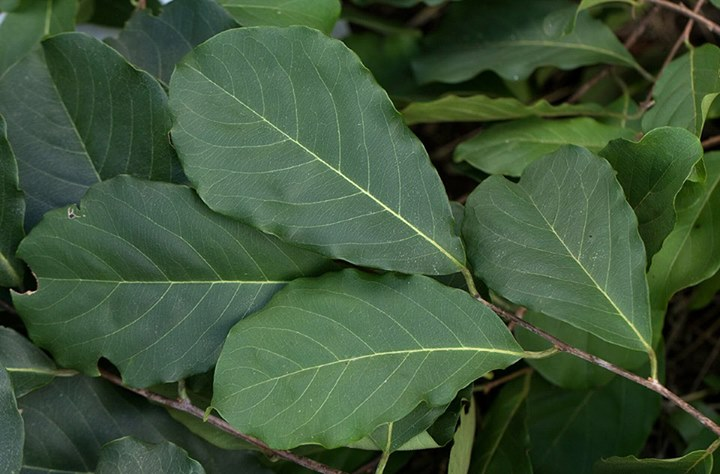

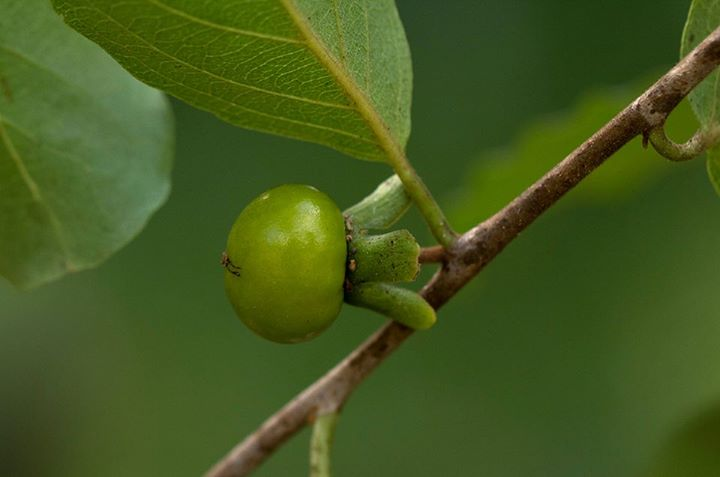
- Foliage and fruit

Scientific classification
- Kingdom: Plantae
- Clade: Tracheophytes
- Clade: Angiosperms
- Clade: Eudicots
- Clade: Asterids
- Order: Ericales
- Family: Ebenaceae
- Genus: Diospyros
- Species: D. squarrosa

Binomial name
- Diospyros squarrosa Klotzsch, 1861

= Diospyros squarrosa =

Rigid star-berry

Species of flowering plant

Diospyros squarrosa, the rigid star-berry, is a dioecious, deciduous shrub or small tree that is native to the tropical and subtropical Afrotropics. Its wood and edible, fleshy fruit are harvested locally.

== Description ==
The bark is grey to brown, and smooth with shallow longitudinal fissures. It grows from 2 to 10 metres tall, and may start flowering while still small. They produce flowers from early to midsummer, which are greenish to creamy-white and fragrant. The flowers are axillary, in lax cymes in males plants, and solitary in female plants. The near-spherical fruit (of female plants) are some 2 cm in diameter. They ripen to a dark yellow colour, and contain 8 to 10 seeds. The calyx lobes are conspicuous. The dull green leaves have clear net-veining on their undersides, and become glabrous when fully grown.

== Habitat ==
It grows on stream verges and in riparian forest, on rocky hillsides and at the bases of granite domes. In some areas they occur along the major river valleys and at higher altitudes are associated with termite mounds. It occurs from near sea level to about 1,200 meters.

== Range ==
It has been recorded in Kenya, Tanzania, Malawi, Zambia, Mozambique, Zimbabwe and the DRC.
