= Diospyros muricata =

Scientific classification
- Kingdom: Plantae
- Clade: Tracheophytes
- Clade: Angiosperms
- Clade: Eudicots
- Clade: Asterids
- Order: Ericales
- Family: Ebenaceae
- Genus: Diospyros
- Species: D. muricata

Binomial name
- Diospyros muricata Bakh.

Species of tree

Diospyros muricata is a tree in the family Ebenaceae. It grows up to 11 metres (40 ft) tall. The twigs are covered with short hairs. Inflorescences bear up to seven flowers. The fruits are ovoid, up to 2 cm (1 in) in diameter. The specific epithet muricata is from the Latin meaning 'rough with short, hard points', referring to the fruits. Habitat is lowland mixed dipterocarp forests from sea level to 1,500 metres (5,000 ft) altitude. D. muricata is endemic to Borneo.
