= Diospyros squamifolia =

Conservation status
- Least Concern (IUCN 3.1)

Scientific classification
- Kingdom: Plantae
- Clade: Tracheophytes
- Clade: Angiosperms
- Clade: Eudicots
- Clade: Asterids
- Order: Ericales
- Family: Ebenaceae
- Genus: Diospyros
- Species: D. squamifolia

Binomial name
- Diospyros squamifolia Kosterm.

Species of flowering plant

Diospyros squamifolia is a small tree in the family Ebenaceae. The specific epithet squamifolia refers to the fish scale shape of the leaves.

== Description ==
Diospyros squamifolia grows up to 5 metres (16 ft) tall. Its fruits are round, measuring up to 1.5 cm (0.6 in) in diameter.

== Distribution and habitat ==
Diospyros squamifolia is endemic to Borneo, where it is known only from Sabah. Its habitat is lowland mixed dipterocarp forests.

== Conservation ==
Diospyros squamifolia has been assessed as least concern on the IUCN Red List. Although endemic to Sabah, the species is widespread and stable there. It is present in many of the state's protected areas.
