= Diospyros hirsuta =

Conservation status
- Vulnerable (IUCN 2.3)

Scientific classification
- Kingdom: Plantae
- Clade: Tracheophytes
- Clade: Angiosperms
- Clade: Eudicots
- Clade: Asterids
- Order: Ericales
- Family: Ebenaceae
- Genus: Diospyros
- Species: D. hirsuta

Binomial name
- Diospyros hirsuta L.f

Species of flowering plant

Diospyros hirsuta is a tree in the ebony family endemic to Sri Lanka.

== Trunk ==
Bark - finely fissured, black; Immature Bark - reddish.
