= Diospyros eucalyptifolia =

Scientific classification
- Kingdom: Plantae
- Clade: Tracheophytes
- Clade: Angiosperms
- Clade: Eudicots
- Clade: Asterids
- Order: Ericales
- Family: Ebenaceae
- Genus: Diospyros
- Species: D. eucalyptifolia

Binomial name
- Diospyros eucalyptifolia Bakh.

Species of tree

Diospyros eucalyptifolia is a small tree in the family Ebenaceae. It grows up to 5 metres (20 ft) tall. The fruits are ovoid to round, up to 2 cm (1 in) in diameter. The specific epithet eucalyptifolia is from the Latin, referring to the leaves' resemblance to those of the genus Eucalyptus. Habitat is mixed dipterocarp forests from sea level to 900 metres (3,000 ft) altitude. D. eucalyptifolia is endemic to Borneo.
