= Diospyros sulcata =

Scientific classification
- Kingdom: Plantae
- Clade: Tracheophytes
- Clade: Angiosperms
- Clade: Eudicots
- Clade: Asterids
- Order: Ericales
- Family: Ebenaceae
- Genus: Diospyros
- Species: D. sulcata

Binomial name
- Diospyros sulcata Bourd.

Species of tree

Diospyros sulcata is a tree in the family Ebenaceae. It grows up to 27 metres (90 ft) tall. Inflorescences bear up to three flowers. The fruits are ovoid or roundish, up to 4 cm (2 in) in diameter. The specific epithet sulcata is from the Latin meaning 'grooved', referring to the leaf midrib. Habitat is hill and montane forests from 850 metres (3,000 ft) to 2,100 metres (7,000 ft) altitude. D. sulcata is found in southwest India and Borneo.
