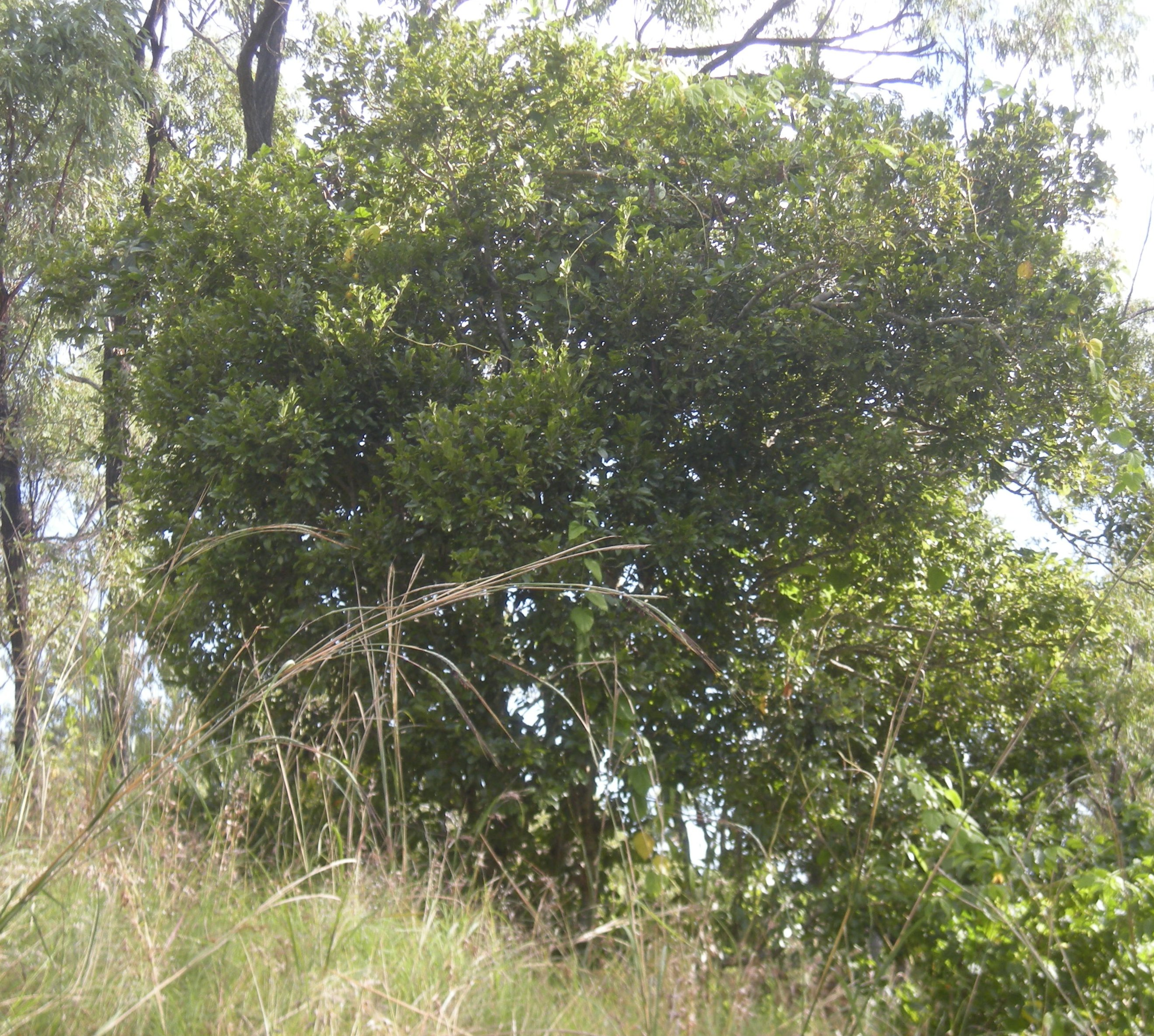
- Diospyros geminata

Scientific classification
- Kingdom: Plantae
- Clade: Tracheophytes
- Clade: Angiosperms
- Clade: Eudicots
- Clade: Asterids
- Order: Ericales
- Family: Ebenaceae
- Genus: Diospyros
- Species: D. geminata

Binomial name
- Diospyros geminata (R.Br.) F.Muell.

= Diospyros geminata =

Species of flowering plant

Diospyros geminata is a small tree or shrub of dry rainforest, gallery forest and sub tropical rainforest of Australia and New Guinea.

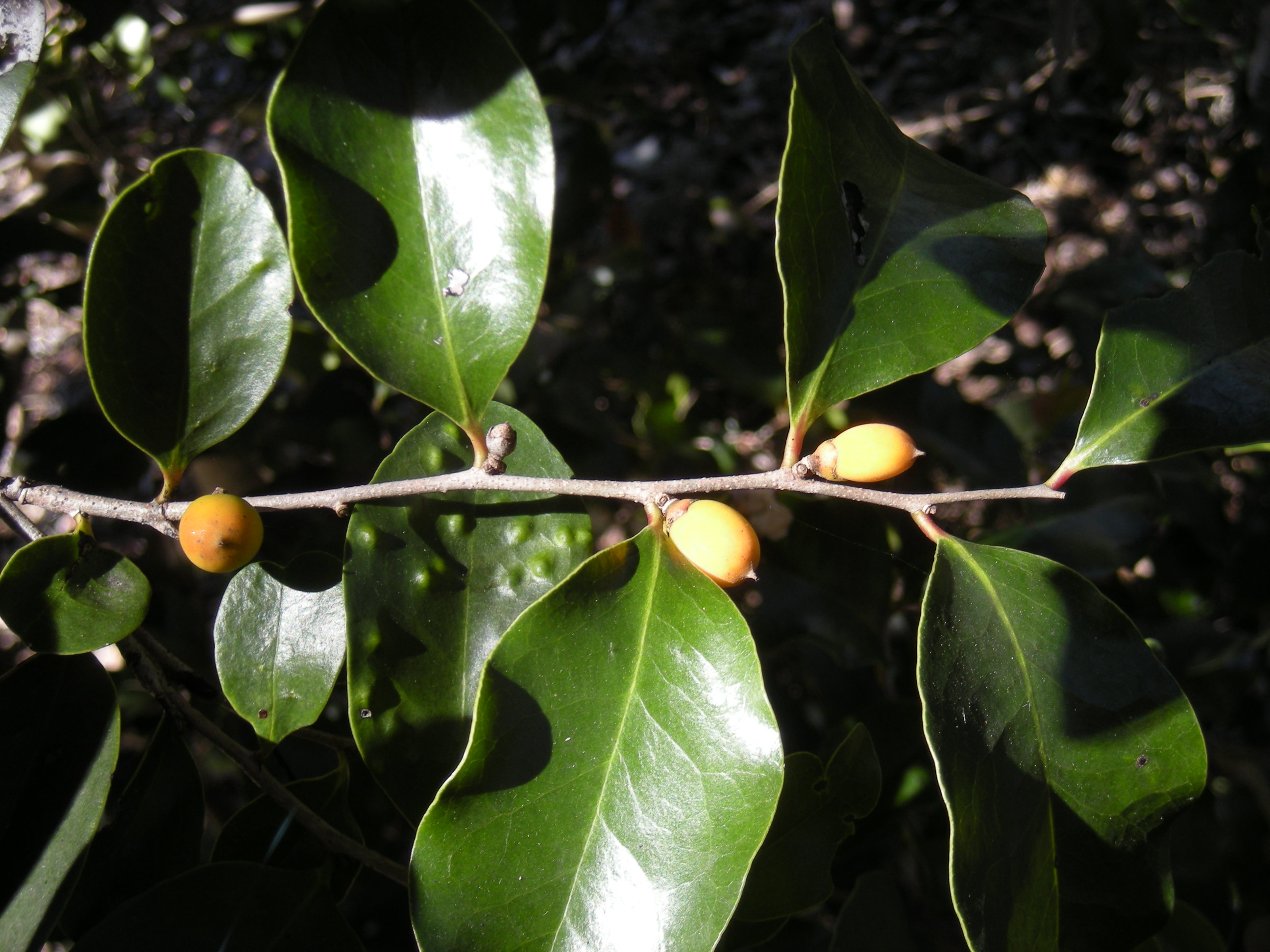
D. geminata fruit
