= Diospyros ferox =

Scientific classification
- Kingdom: Plantae
- Clade: Tracheophytes
- Clade: Angiosperms
- Clade: Eudicots
- Clade: Asterids
- Order: Ericales
- Family: Ebenaceae
- Genus: Diospyros
- Species: D. ferox

Binomial name
- Diospyros ferox Bakh.

Species of tree

Diospyros ferox is a tree in the family Ebenaceae. It grows up to 20 metres (70 ft) tall. Inflorescences bear up to three flowers. The fruits are oblong-ovoid to round, up to 3 cm (1 in) in diameter. The specific epithet ferox is from the Latin meaning 'fierce', referring to the rusty bristles on twigs, leaves, flowers and fruits. Habitat is swamps and mixed dipterocarp forests from sea-level to 900 metres (3,000 ft) altitude. D. ferox is endemic to Borneo.
