= Diospyros borneensis =

Conservation status
- Least Concern (IUCN 3.1)

Scientific classification
- Kingdom: Plantae
- Clade: Tracheophytes
- Clade: Angiosperms
- Clade: Eudicots
- Clade: Asterids
- Order: Ericales
- Family: Ebenaceae
- Genus: Diospyros
- Species: D. borneensis

Binomial name
- Diospyros borneensis Hiern

Synonyms
- Diospyros fecunda Fletcher; Diospyros tawaensis Merr.

Species of tree

Diospyros borneensis is a tree in the family Ebenaceae. It grows up to 20 metres (70 ft) tall. Twigs are reddish brown when young, drying black. Inflorescences bear up to 20 flowers. The fruits are round, drying black, up to 4.2 cm (2 in) in diameter. The tree is named for Borneo. Habitat is forests from sea-level to 1,000 metres (3,300 ft) altitude. D. borneensis is found in Peninsular Thailand, Sumatra, Peninsular Malaysia and Borneo.
