= Diospyros walkeri =

Conservation status
- Vulnerable (IUCN 2.3)

Scientific classification
- Kingdom: Plantae
- Clade: Embryophytes
- Clade: Tracheophytes
- Clade: Spermatophytes
- Clade: Angiosperms
- Clade: Eudicots
- Clade: Asterids
- Order: Ericales
- Family: Ebenaceae
- Genus: Diospyros
- Species: D. walkeri

Binomial name
- Diospyros walkeri (Wight.) Gürke.

Species of flowering plant

Diospyros walkeri is a tree in the Ebony family, endemic to Sri Lanka.
