= Diospyros curranii =

Conservation status
- Least Concern (IUCN 3.1)

Scientific classification
- Kingdom: Plantae
- Clade: Tracheophytes
- Clade: Angiosperms
- Clade: Eudicots
- Clade: Asterids
- Order: Ericales
- Family: Ebenaceae
- Genus: Diospyros
- Species: D. curranii

Binomial name
- Diospyros curranii Merr.

Synonyms
- Diospyros curraniopsis Bakh.; Diospyros sibuyanensis Elmer; Diospyros subviridis Fletcher; Diospyros viridifolia Elmer

Species of tree

Diospyros curranii is a tree in the family Ebenaceae. It grows up to 30 metres (100 ft) tall. The fruits are roundish, up to 2.5 cm (1 in) in diameter. Habitat is mixed dipterocarp forests from sea-level to 900 metres (3,000 ft) altitude. D. curranii is found in Indochina and from west Malesia to the Philippines.
