= Diospyros hallieri =

Scientific classification
- Kingdom: Plantae
- Clade: Tracheophytes
- Clade: Angiosperms
- Clade: Eudicots
- Clade: Asterids
- Order: Ericales
- Family: Ebenaceae
- Genus: Diospyros
- Species: D. hallieri

Binomial name
- Diospyros hallieri Bakh.

Species of tree

Diospyros hallieri is a tree in the family Ebenaceae. It grows up to 30 metres (100 ft) tall. Twigs are reddish brown when young. Inflorescences bear up to 10 flowers. The fruits are ovoid to round, up to 5 cm (2 in) in diameter. The tree is named for the German botanist J. G. Hallier. Habitat is lowland mixed dipterocarp forests. D. hallieri is endemic to Borneo.
