= Diospyros tuberculata =

Scientific classification
- Kingdom: Plantae
- Clade: Tracheophytes
- Clade: Angiosperms
- Clade: Eudicots
- Clade: Asterids
- Order: Ericales
- Family: Ebenaceae
- Genus: Diospyros
- Species: D. tuberculata

Binomial name
- Diospyros tuberculata Bakh.

Species of tree

Diospyros tuberculata is a tree in the family Ebenaceae. It grows up to 15 metres (50 ft) tall. Inflorescences bear up to five or more flowers. The fruits are ovoid to round, up to 2 cm (1 in) in diameter. The specific epithet tuberculata is from the Latin meaning 'wart-covered', possibly referring to the fruit. Its habitat is lowland mixed dipterocarp forests. D. tuberculata is endemic to Borneo.
