= Diospyros lateralis =

Scientific classification
- Kingdom: Plantae
- Clade: Tracheophytes
- Clade: Angiosperms
- Clade: Eudicots
- Clade: Asterids
- Order: Ericales
- Family: Ebenaceae
- Genus: Diospyros
- Species: D. lateralis

Binomial name
- Diospyros lateralis Hiern

Synonyms
- Diospyros crassipes Bakh.

Species of tree

Diospyros lateralis is a tree in the family Ebenaceae. It grows up to 17 metres (60 ft) tall. Inflorescences bear up to three flowers. The fruits are round to ovoid, up to 2.6 cm (1 in) in diameter. The specific epithet lateralis is from the Latin meaning 'lateral', referring to the position of the inflorescences on the stem. Habitat is lowland mixed dipterocarp forests. D. lateralis is found in Thailand, Sumatra and Borneo.
