= Diospyros styraciformis =

Scientific classification
- Kingdom: Plantae
- Clade: Tracheophytes
- Clade: Angiosperms
- Clade: Eudicots
- Clade: Asterids
- Order: Ericales
- Family: Ebenaceae
- Genus: Diospyros
- Species: D. styraciformis

Binomial name
- Diospyros styraciformis King & Gamble

Synonyms
- Diospyros clavipes Bakh.; Diospyros sarawakana Bakh.

Species of tree

Diospyros styraciformis is a tree in the family Ebenaceae. It grows up to 20 metres (70 ft) tall. Inflorescences bear several flowers. The fruits are roundish, up to 3.5 cm (1 in) in diameter. The specific epithet styraciformis refers to the resemblance of the fruits to those of the genus Styrax. The fruits are locally used to stun fish. Habitat is forests from sea-level to 950 metres (3,000 ft) altitude. D. styraciformis is found in Sumatra, Peninsular Malaysia and Borneo.
