= Diospyros korthalsiana =

Scientific classification
- Kingdom: Plantae
- Clade: Tracheophytes
- Clade: Angiosperms
- Clade: Eudicots
- Clade: Asterids
- Order: Ericales
- Family: Ebenaceae
- Genus: Diospyros
- Species: D. korthalsiana

Binomial name
- Diospyros korthalsiana Hiern

Synonyms
- Diospyros bangueyensis Merr.; Diospyros inclusa Merr.; Diospyros korthalsiana var. kinabaluensis Bakh.; Diospyros korthalsiana var. macrocarpa Bakh.; Diospyros korthalsiana var. mirandae (Merr.) Bakh.; Diospyros macrocarpa Korth. ex Hiern; Diospyros mirandae Merr.; Diospyros myrmecocalyx (Hiern) Bakh.; Diospyros triflora Merr.; Ebenus myrmecocalyx (Hiern) Kuntze; Maba myrmecocalyx Hiern

Species of tree

Diospyros korthalsiana is a tree in the family Ebenaceae. It grows up to 20 metres (70 ft) tall. Twigs dry to whitish. Inflorescences bear up to seven flowers. The fruits are oblong or ovoid, drying black, up to 4 cm (2 in) long. The tree is named for the Dutch botanist P. W. Korthals. Habitat is mixed dipterocarp forests from sea-level to 1,000 metres (3,300 ft) altitude. D. korthalsiana is found in Borneo, Sulawesi and the Philippines.
