= Diospyros longibracteata =

Conservation status
- Least Concern (IUCN 3.1)

Scientific classification
- Kingdom: Plantae
- Clade: Tracheophytes
- Clade: Angiosperms
- Clade: Eudicots
- Clade: Asterids
- Order: Ericales
- Family: Ebenaceae
- Genus: Diospyros
- Species: D. longibracteata

Binomial name
- Diospyros longibracteata Lecomte

Species of flowering plant

Diospyros longibracteata is a species of flowering plant in the family Ebenaceae. It is native to Southern China (including Hainan and Guangxi), Laos, and Vietnam.

It was first described by French botanist, Paul Henri Lecomte in 1928.
