= Diospyros acuminata =

Conservation status
- Vulnerable (IUCN 2.3)

Scientific classification
- Kingdom: Plantae
- Clade: Tracheophytes
- Clade: Angiosperms
- Clade: Eudicots
- Clade: Asterids
- Order: Ericales
- Family: Ebenaceae
- Genus: Diospyros
- Species: D. acuminata

Binomial name
- Diospyros acuminata (Thw.) Kosterm.

Synonyms.
- Diospyros imbricata Bakh.; Ebenus acuminata (Thwaites) Kuntze; Maba acuminata (Thwaites) Hiern; Macreightia acuminata Thwaites

Species of flowering plant

Diospyros acuminata is a tree in the Ebony family which is endemic to Sri Lanka.
