= Diospyros fusiformis =

Scientific classification
- Kingdom: Plantae
- Clade: Tracheophytes
- Clade: Angiosperms
- Clade: Eudicots
- Clade: Asterids
- Order: Ericales
- Family: Ebenaceae
- Genus: Diospyros
- Species: D. fusiformis

Binomial name
- Diospyros fusiformis Kosterm.

Species of tree

Diospyros fusiformis is a tree in the family Ebenaceae. It grows up to 15 metres (50 ft) tall. Inflorescences bear up to 10 flowers. The fruits are ovoid to spindle-shaped, up to 4 cm (1.6 in) in diameter. The specific epithet fusiformis is from the Latin meaning 'spindle-shaped', referring to the fruits. Habitat is mixed dipterocarp forests from sea level to 600 metres (2,000 ft) altitude. D. fusiformis is endemic to Borneo.
