= Diospyros elliptifolia =

Scientific classification
- Kingdom: Plantae
- Clade: Tracheophytes
- Clade: Angiosperms
- Clade: Eudicots
- Clade: Asterids
- Order: Ericales
- Family: Ebenaceae
- Genus: Diospyros
- Species: D. elliptifolia

Binomial name
- Diospyros elliptifolia Merr.

Synonyms
- Diospyros kinabaluensis (Bakh.) Kosterm.

Species of tree

Diospyros elliptifolia is a tree in the family Ebenaceae. It grows up to 18 metres (60 ft) tall. Inflorescences bear up to three flowers. The fruits are roundish, drying black, up to 3 cm (1 in) in diameter. The specific epithet elliptifolia is from the Latin meaning 'elliptic leaves'. Habitat is mixed dipterocarp forests from sea-level to 800 metres (2,600 ft) altitude. D. elliptifolia is found in Sumatra, Borneo and the Philippines.
