= Diospyros simaloerensis =

Scientific classification
- Kingdom: Plantae
- Clade: Tracheophytes
- Clade: Angiosperms
- Clade: Eudicots
- Clade: Asterids
- Order: Ericales
- Family: Ebenaceae
- Genus: Diospyros
- Species: D. simaloerensis

Binomial name
- Diospyros simaloerensis Bakh.

Synonyms
- Diospyros paraoesi Bakh.

Species of tree

Charcoal Wood (Diospyros simaloerensis) is a tree in the family Ebenaceae and the genus Diospyros, a genus of deciduous and evergreen trees and shrubs. The tree is named for Simeulue Island in Sumatra.

== Description ==
D. simaloerensis grows up to 30m (100 ft) tall. It has grey colored bark. Inflorescences bear up to five flowers. The fruits are round, up to 1.5 cm (0.6 in) in diameter.

== Habitat ==
Its habitat is lowland tropics (mixed-dipterocarp forests), ranging from sea level to 600 metres (2,000 ft) in altitude. D. simaloerensis is native to Sumatra and Borneo.
