= Diospyros major =

Scientific classification
- Kingdom: Plantae
- Clade: Tracheophytes
- Clade: Angiosperms
- Clade: Eudicots
- Clade: Asterids
- Order: Ericales
- Family: Ebenaceae
- Genus: Diospyros
- Species: D. major

Binomial name
- Diospyros major (G.Forst.) Bakh.

Species of tree

Diospyros major, or the Fiji persimmon, is a tree in the family Ebenaceae that is native to Fiji, Tonga, Uvea, and Futuna. It is called 'mapa in the Tongan language.
