= Diospyros cordata =

Conservation status
- Data Deficient (IUCN 3.1)

Scientific classification
- Kingdom: Plantae
- Clade: Tracheophytes
- Clade: Angiosperms
- Clade: Eudicots
- Clade: Asterids
- Order: Ericales
- Family: Ebenaceae
- Genus: Diospyros
- Species: D. cordata

Binomial name
- Diospyros cordata (Hiern) Bakh.

Synonyms
- Ebenus cordata (Hiern) Kuntze; Maba cordata Hiern

Species of flowering plant

Diospyros cordata is a small tree in the family Ebenaceae. It grows up to 1.5 metres (5 ft) tall. The specific epithet cordata is from the Latin meaning 'heart-shaped', referring to the leaf base. D. cordata is endemic to Borneo and known only from Sarawak.
