= Diospyros evena =

Scientific classification
- Kingdom: Plantae
- Clade: Tracheophytes
- Clade: Angiosperms
- Clade: Eudicots
- Clade: Asterids
- Order: Ericales
- Family: Ebenaceae
- Genus: Diospyros
- Species: D. evena

Binomial name
- Diospyros evena Bakh.

Synonyms
- Ebenus motleyi (Hiern) Kuntze; Maba motleyi Hiern

Species of tree

Diospyros evena is a tree in the family Ebenaceae. It grows up to 25 metres (80 ft) tall. Twigs dry to black. Inflorescences bear a solitary flower. The fruits are oblong, up to 2.3 cm (1 in) long. The specific epithet evena is from the Latin meaning 'without veins', referring to the leaf's invisible veins. Habitat is freshwater swamp forests. D. evena is found in Sumatra and Borneo.
