= Diospyros neurosepala =

Scientific classification
- Kingdom: Plantae
- Clade: Tracheophytes
- Clade: Angiosperms
- Clade: Eudicots
- Clade: Asterids
- Order: Ericales
- Family: Ebenaceae
- Genus: Diospyros
- Species: D. neurosepala

Binomial name
- Diospyros neurosepala Bakh.

Species of tree

Diospyros neurosepala is a tree in the family Ebenaceae. It grows up to 13 metres (40 ft) tall. Inflorescences bear up to six flowers. The fruits are round, up to 4.5 cm (2 in) in diameter. The specific epithet neurosepala is from the Greek meaning 'sinewy sepal', referring to the veined fruit calyx. D. neurosepala is endemic to Borneo.
