= Diospyros everettii =

Scientific classification
- Kingdom: Plantae
- Clade: Tracheophytes
- Clade: Angiosperms
- Clade: Eudicots
- Clade: Asterids
- Order: Ericales
- Family: Ebenaceae
- Genus: Diospyros
- Species: D. everettii

Binomial name
- Diospyros everettii Merr.

Species of tree

Diospyros everettii is a tree in the family Ebenaceae. It grows up to 15 metres (50 ft) tall. Inflorescences bear up to six flowers. The fruits are roundish, up to 1 cm (0.4 in) in diameter. D. everettii is found in Borneo and the Philippines.
