= Diospyros ridleyi =

Conservation status
- Least Concern (IUCN 2.3)

Scientific classification
- Kingdom: Plantae
- Clade: Tracheophytes
- Clade: Angiosperms
- Clade: Eudicots
- Clade: Asterids
- Order: Ericales
- Family: Ebenaceae
- Genus: Diospyros
- Species: D. ridleyi

Binomial name
- Diospyros ridleyi Bakh.

Synonyms
- Diospyros dajakensis Bakh.; Diospyros pyrrhocarpoides B.R.Ramesh & De Franceschi

Species of tree

Diospyros ridleyi is a tree in the family Ebenaceae. It grows up to 30 metres (100 ft) tall. Twigs are reddish brown when young. Inflorescences bear up to three flowers. The fruits are round to ovoid, up to 5 cm (2 in) in diameter. The tree is named for the English botanist Henry Nicholas Ridley. Habitat is mainly lowland mixed dipterocarp forests. D. ridleyi is found in India, Peninsular Malaysia and Borneo.
