= Diospyros insignis =

Scientific classification
- Kingdom: Plantae
- Clade: Tracheophytes
- Clade: Angiosperms
- Clade: Eudicots
- Clade: Asterids
- Order: Ericales
- Family: Ebenaceae
- Genus: Diospyros
- Species: D. insignis

Binomial name
- Diospyros insignis Thwaites

Synonyms
- Diospyros insignis var. parvifolia Kosterm.

Species of flowering plant

Diospyros insignis, is an evergreen tree in the ebony family, distributed in Western Ghats of India and Sri Lanka.
