= Diospyros coriacea =

Conservation status
- Vulnerable (IUCN 3.1)

Scientific classification
- Kingdom: Plantae
- Clade: Tracheophytes
- Clade: Angiosperms
- Clade: Eudicots
- Clade: Asterids
- Order: Ericales
- Family: Ebenaceae
- Genus: Diospyros
- Species: D. coriacea

Binomial name
- Diospyros coriacea Hiern

Species of flowering plant

Diospyros coriacea is a tree in the family Ebenaceae. The specific epithet coriacea means 'leathery', referring to the leaves. The species is native to Peninsular Malaysia, Singapore and Borneo.

== Description ==
Diospyros coriacea grows up to 15 metres (50 ft) tall. The twigs dry blackish. The inflorescences bear up to seven flowers. The fruits are roundish, up to 3.5 cm (1 in) in diameter.

== Conservation ==
Diospyros coriacea has been assessed as vulnerable on the IUCN Red List. Its small population and habitat in lowland swamp forests leave it threatened by land conversion for agriculture and urban development. The species is present in only one protected area, in Sarawak.
