= Diospyros confertiflora =

Scientific classification
- Kingdom: Plantae
- Clade: Tracheophytes
- Clade: Angiosperms
- Clade: Eudicots
- Clade: Asterids
- Order: Ericales
- Family: Ebenaceae
- Genus: Diospyros
- Species: D. confertiflora

Binomial name
- Diospyros confertiflora (Hiern) Bakh.

Synonyms
- Ebenus confertiflora (Hiern) Kuntze; Maba confertiflora Hiern; Maba perakensis King & Gamble

Species of tree

Diospyros confertiflora is a tree in the family Ebenaceae. It grows up to 20 metres (70 ft) tall. The twigs dry to black. Inflorescences bear up to 12 flowers. The fruits are ovoid, up to 2.2 cm (1 in) in diameter. The specific epithet confertiflora is from the Latin meaning 'crowded flowers'. Habitat is lowland forests. D. confertiflora is found in Peninsular Thailand, Sumatra, Peninsular Malaysia and Borneo.
