= Diospyros plectosepala =

Conservation status
- Vulnerable (IUCN 3.1)

Scientific classification
- Kingdom: Plantae
- Clade: Tracheophytes
- Clade: Angiosperms
- Clade: Eudicots
- Clade: Asterids
- Order: Ericales
- Family: Ebenaceae
- Genus: Diospyros
- Species: D. plectosepala

Binomial name
- Diospyros plectosepala Hiern

Synonyms
- Diospyros poiensis Bakh.; Diospyros setosa Bakh.

Species of tree

Diospyros plectosepala is a tree in the family Ebenaceae. The specific epithet plectosepala means 'twisted sepal'.

== Description ==
Diospyros plectosepala grows up to 8 metres (30 ft) tall. The fruits are oblong to ellipsoid, up to 3 cm (1 in) long.

== Distribution and habitat ==
Diospyros plectosepala is endemic to Borneo, where it is known only from Sarawak. Its habitat is forests to 1,500 metres (5,000 ft) elevation.
