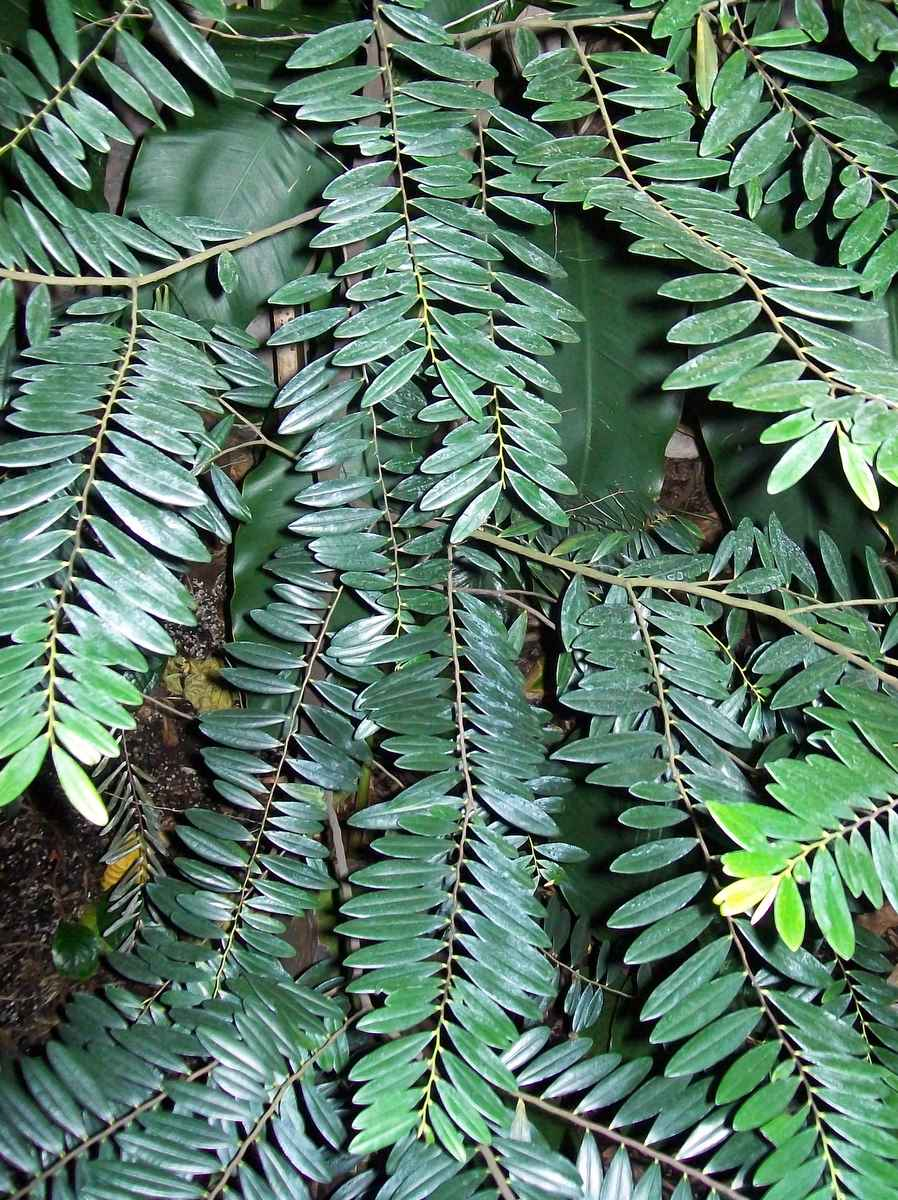

Conservation status
- Vulnerable (IUCN 2.3)

Scientific classification
- Kingdom: Plantae
- Clade: Tracheophytes
- Clade: Angiosperms
- Clade: Eudicots
- Clade: Asterids
- Order: Ericales
- Family: Ebenaceae
- Genus: Diospyros
- Species: D. seychellarum

Binomial name
- Diospyros seychellarum Hiern

Synonyms
- Ebenus seychellarum (Hiern) Kuntze; Maba seychellarum Hiern; Diospyros boivinana; (Baill.) G.E.Schatz & Lowry

= Diospyros seychellarum =

Species of tree

Diospyros seychellarum, locally known as bwa sagay, is a rare endemic plant from the Seychelles. It occurs on the islands of Mahé, Praslin, Silhouette and Felicite. It is locally known as bwa sagay.

== Description and Habitat ==
The habitat for this small forest tree or shrub is in well-drained situations or in more open rocky areas, often on granite based soils. Diospyros seychellarum is particularly associated with native palm and pandan scrub habitats. It can grow up to 10 meters tall. In most of its habitats it has a stable population, but in some populations, it can be threatened.

== Conservation ==
Diospyros seychellarum faces threats from invasive weeds such as cinnamon and jackfruit. As well as disturbance from logging and land clearing for agriculture. Certain populations are conserved in Seychelles National Parks. It is an IUCN Red List vulnerable species.

== Uses ==
A study on the cytotoxicity of Diospyros seychellarum found that the extract of D. seychellarum can induce apoptosis. It made a point that this should be studied further. It has been used by healers in the Seychelles as a tonic. The plant is harvested in the wild and used as medicine and fuel. The leaves have been used to correct blood pressure and making baths. The wood has been harvested and used in cinnamon oil distilleries.
