= Diospyros inconstans =

Scientific classification
- Kingdom: Plantae
- Clade: Tracheophytes
- Clade: Angiosperms
- Clade: Eudicots
- Clade: Asterids
- Order: Ericales
- Family: Ebenaceae
- Genus: Diospyros
- Species: D. inconstans

Binomial name
- Diospyros inconstans Jacq.

Synonyms
- Ebenus inconstans (Jacq.) Kuntze; Maba inconstans (Jacq.) Griseb.; Macreightia inconstans (Jacq.) A.DC.

Species of tree

Diospyros inconstans is a species of tree in the family Ebenaceae. It is native to Panama and South America.

== Taxonomy ==
As of 2023, there are 5 accepted infraspecies described with D. inconstans

- Diospyros inconstans subsp. darienk B.Walln.: Native to Colombia and Panama
- Diospyros inconstans subsp. delgadoi (Standl.) B.Walln. (syn. Diospyros delgadoi): Native to Venezuela and the Venezuelan Antilles
- Diospyros inconstans subsp. inconstans
- Diospyros inconstans subsp. obovata (Mart. ex Miq.) B.Walln. (syn. Maba inconstans var. obovata and Macreightia obovata): Native to Brazil, Uruguay, Paraguay and Argentina
- Diospyros inconstans subsp. psidioides (Kunth) B.Walln. (syn. Diospyros psidioides and Macreightia psidioides): Native to northern South America. This subspecies contains several other names previously considered independent Diospyros species such as Diospyros acreana, Diospyros boliviana, Diospyros conduplicata (syn. Macreightia conduplicata), Diospyros pavonii (syn. Ebenus pavonii, Maba pavonii and Macreightia pavonii) and Diospyros velutina.
