= Diospyros mun =

Conservation status
- Endangered (IUCN 3.1)

Scientific classification
- Kingdom: Plantae
- Clade: Tracheophytes
- Clade: Angiosperms
- Clade: Eudicots
- Clade: Asterids
- Order: Ericales
- Family: Ebenaceae
- Genus: Diospyros
- Species: D. mun

Binomial name
- Diospyros mun A.Chev.

Species of plant

Diospyros mun is a species of flowering plant in the family Ebenaceae. It is the source of a precious wood traded under the names of mun ebony or Vietnamese ebony.
