= Diospyros perfida =

Scientific classification
- Kingdom: Plantae
- Clade: Tracheophytes
- Clade: Angiosperms
- Clade: Eudicots
- Clade: Asterids
- Order: Ericales
- Family: Ebenaceae
- Genus: Diospyros
- Species: D. perfida

Binomial name
- Diospyros perfida Bakh.

Species of tree

Diospyros perfida is a tree in the family Ebenaceae. It grows up to 25 metres (80 ft) tall. Inflorescences bear up to three flowers. The fruits are roundish, up to 5 cm (2 in) in diameter. The specific epithet perfida is from the Latin meaning 'unsafe', referring to the allegedly poisonous fruits. Habitat is lowland mixed dipterocarp forests. D. perfida is endemic to Borneo.
