= Diospyros lanceifolia =

Scientific classification
- Kingdom: Plantae
- Clade: Tracheophytes
- Clade: Angiosperms
- Clade: Eudicots
- Clade: Asterids
- Order: Ericales
- Family: Ebenaceae
- Genus: Diospyros
- Species: D. lanceifolia

Binomial name
- Diospyros lanceifolia Roxb.

Species of flowering plant

Diospyros lanceifolia is a tree in the family Ebenaceae. The specific epithet lanceifolia means 'lance-shaped leaves'.

== Description ==
Diospyros lanceifolia grows up to 27 metres (90 ft) tall. Its twigs are reddish brown when young, aging blackish or dark brown. Inflorescences bear up to 10 flowers. The fruits are round, up to 2.5 cm (1 in) in diameter.

== Distribution and habitat ==
Diospyros lanceifolia is native to Nepal, India, Thailand, Sumatra, Peninsular Malaysia, Borneo and the Philippines. Its habitat is lowland forests.
