= Diospyros ulo =

Scientific classification
- Kingdom: Plantae
- Clade: Tracheophytes
- Clade: Angiosperms
- Clade: Eudicots
- Clade: Asterids
- Order: Ericales
- Family: Ebenaceae
- Genus: Diospyros
- Species: D. ulo

Binomial name
- Diospyros ulo Merr.

Species of tree

Diospyros ulo is a tree in the family Ebenaceae. It grows up to 22 metres (70 ft) tall. Inflorescences bear up to three or more flowers. The fruits are obovoid to round, up to 5 cm (2 in) in diameter. The tree is named for the Philippine local name ulo. Habitat is lowland mixed dipterocarp forests. D. ulo is found in Borneo and the Philippines.
