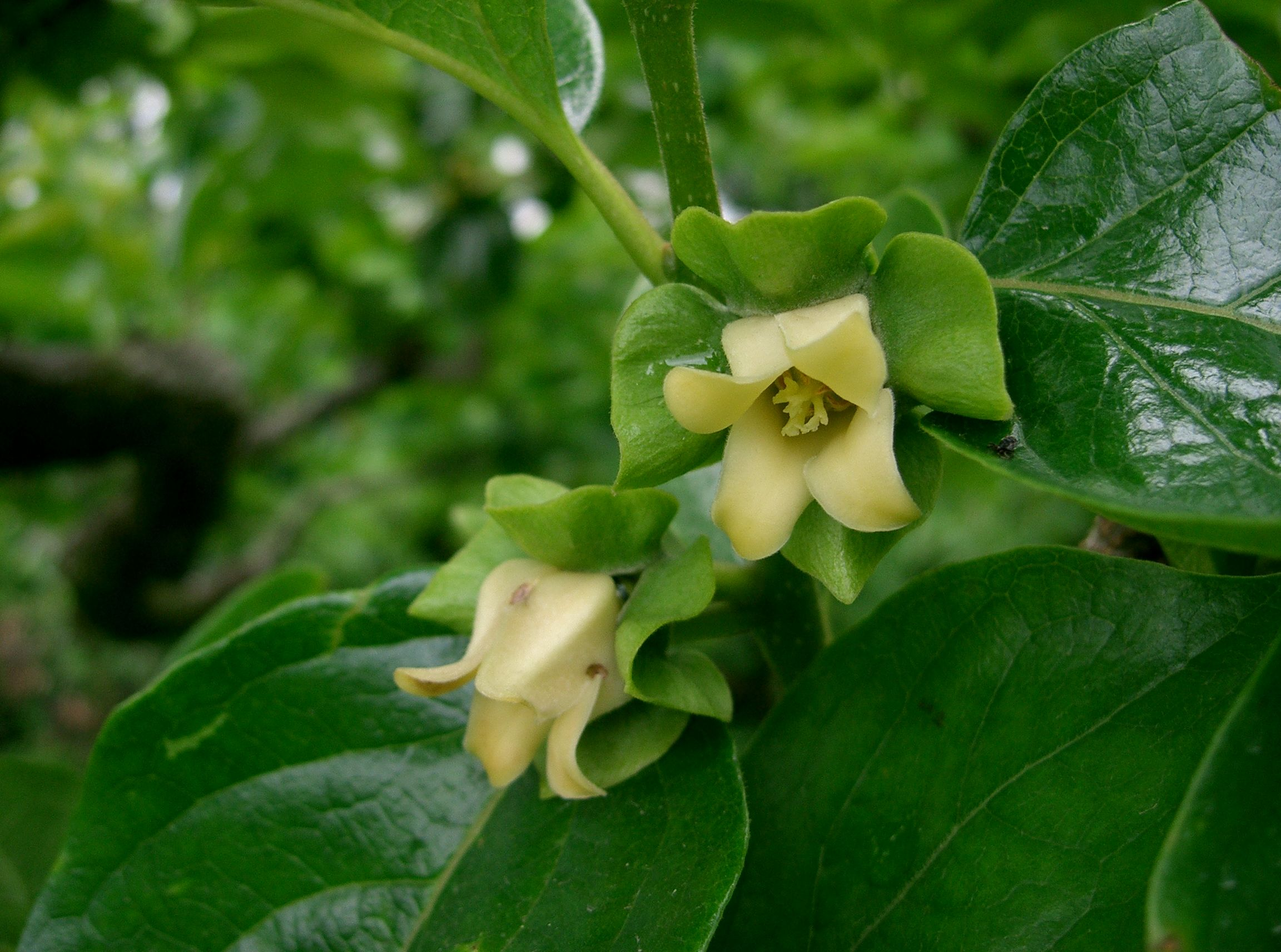
- Flowers of Diospyros kaki

Scientific classification
- Kingdom: Plantae
- Clade: Tracheophytes
- Clade: Angiosperms
- Clade: Eudicots
- Clade: Asterids
- Order: Ericales
- Family: Ebenaceae
- Genus: Diospyros; L.

Type species
- Diospyros lotus L.

Diversity
- About 750 species

Synonyms
- List: Cargillia R.Br.; Cavanillea Desr.; Ebenus Kuntze (nom. illeg.); Embryopteris Gaertn.; Guaiacana Duhamel (nom. illeg.); Idesia Scop.; Maba J.R.Forst. & G.Forst.; Mabola Raf.; Macreightia A.DC.; Noltia Thonn.; Paralea Aubl.; Pimia Seem.; Rhaphidanthe Hiern ex Gürke; Ropourea Aubl.; Royena L.; Tetraclis Hiern

= Diospyros =

Diospyros Temporal range: Eocene–Recent

Genus of trees and shrubs

Diospyros is a genus of over 700 species of deciduous and evergreen trees and shrubs, which are typically dioecious. The majority are native to the tropics and many are of local ecological importance.

Species valued for their hard, heavy, dark timber are commonly known as ebony trees, while those valued for their fruit are known as persimmon trees.

== Description ==
The genus consists of deciduous and evergreen trees and shrubs. Its species are generally dioecious, with male and female flowers on separate plants.

== Taxonomy ==
The genus is a large one and the number of species has been estimated variously, depending on the date of the source. The Royal Botanic Gardens, Kew, list has over 1,000 entries, including synonyms and items of low confidence. Over 700 species are marked as being assigned with high confidence.

The oldest fossils of the genus date to the Eocene, which indicate by that time Diospyros was widely distributed over the Northern Hemisphere.

=== Selected species ===
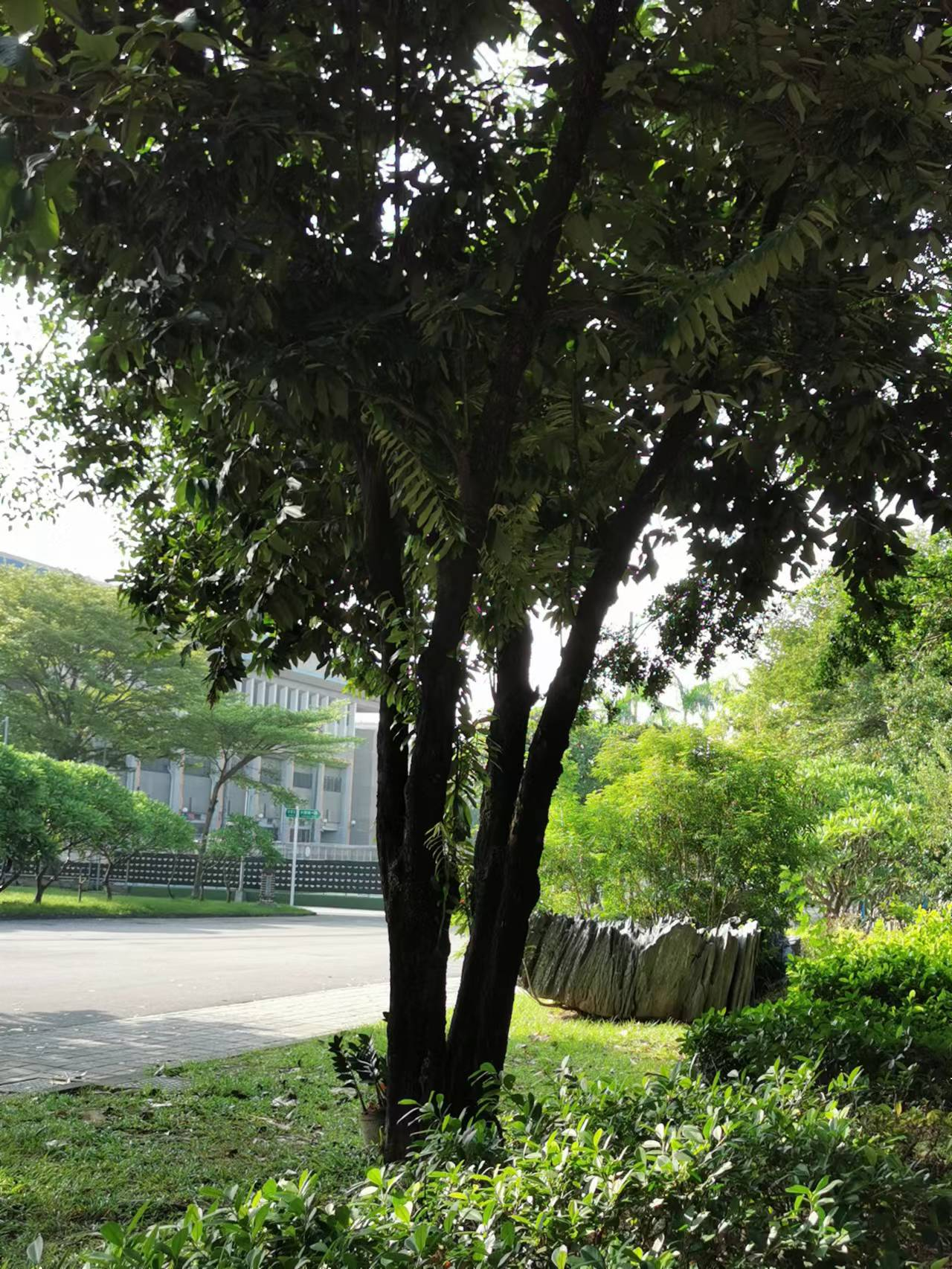
Diospyros blancoi, known also as "Taiwan ebony", slow growth

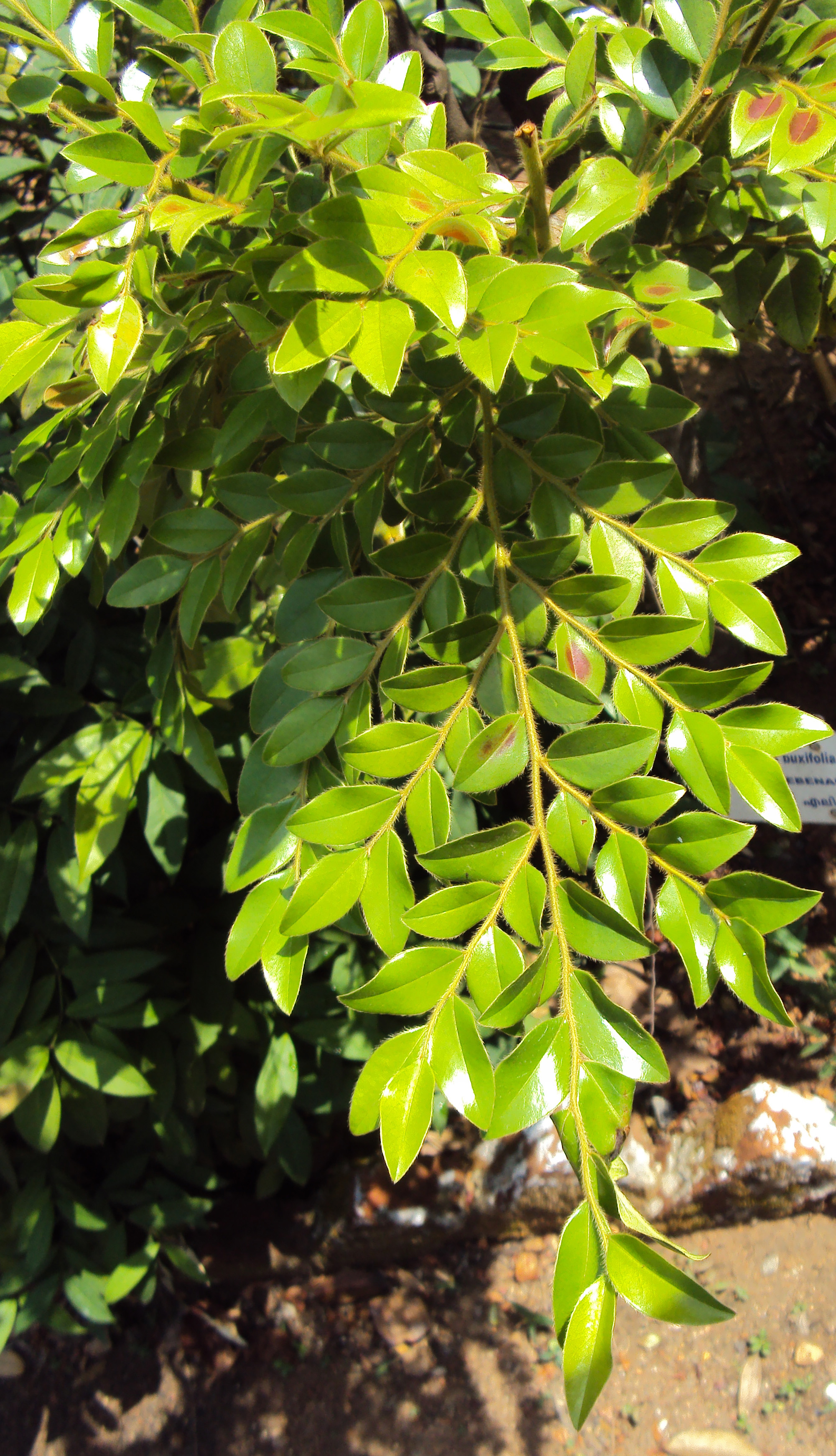
Diospyros buxifolia leaves

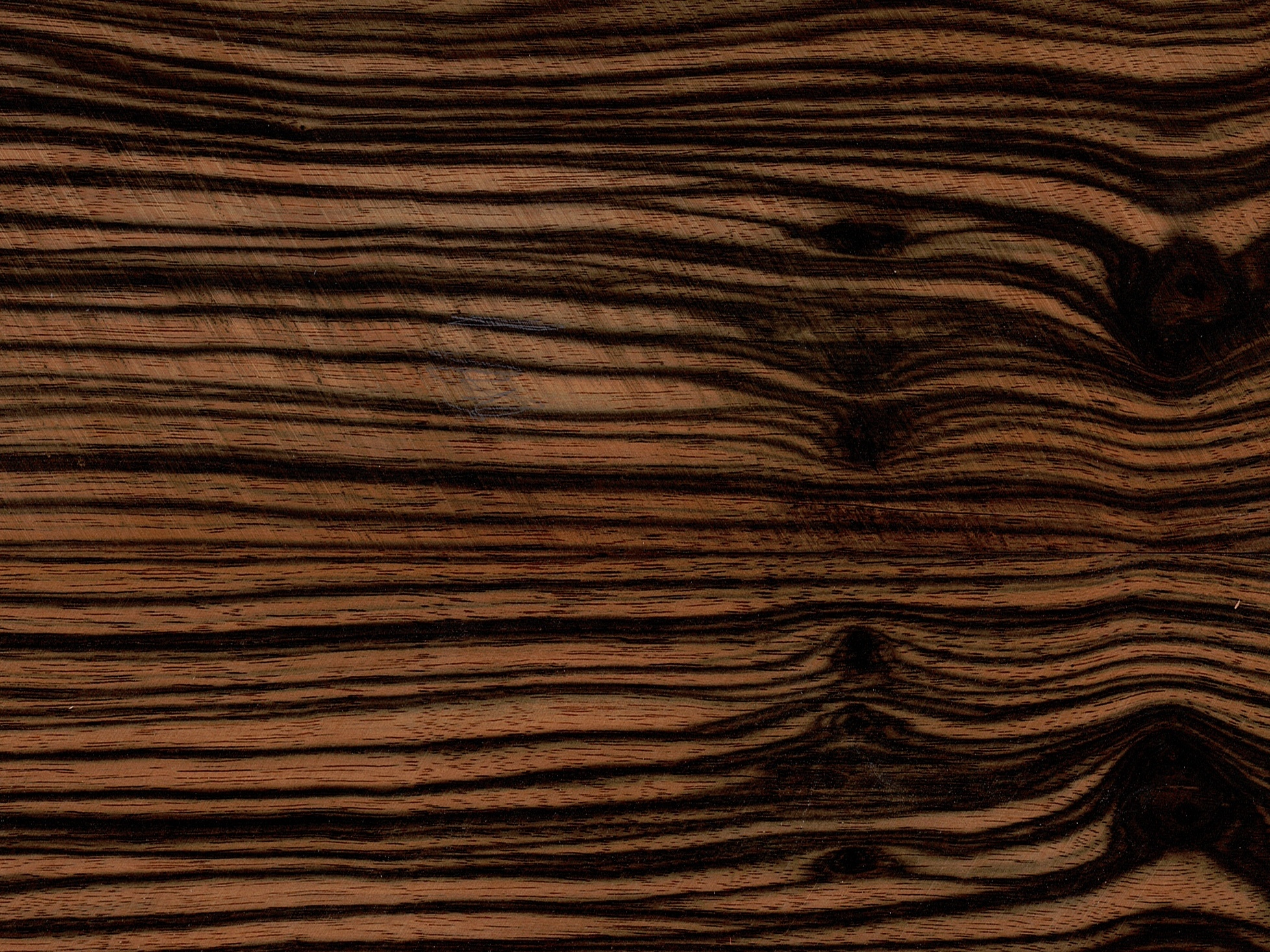
Diospyros celebica wood

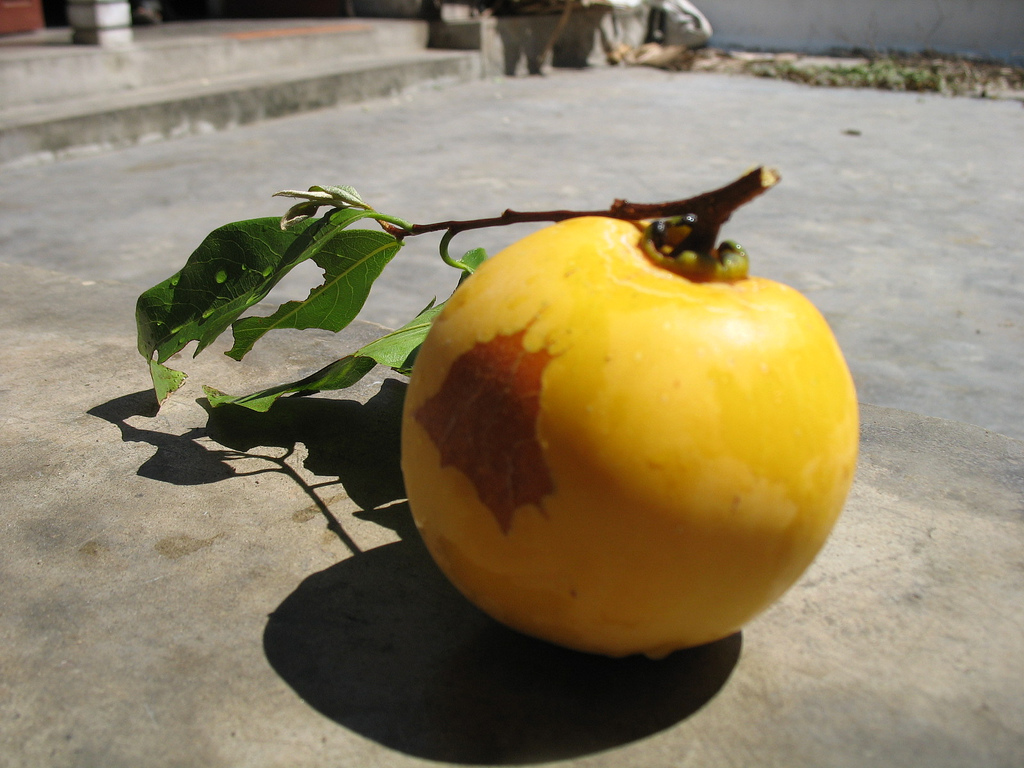
Gold apple (D. decandra) fruit

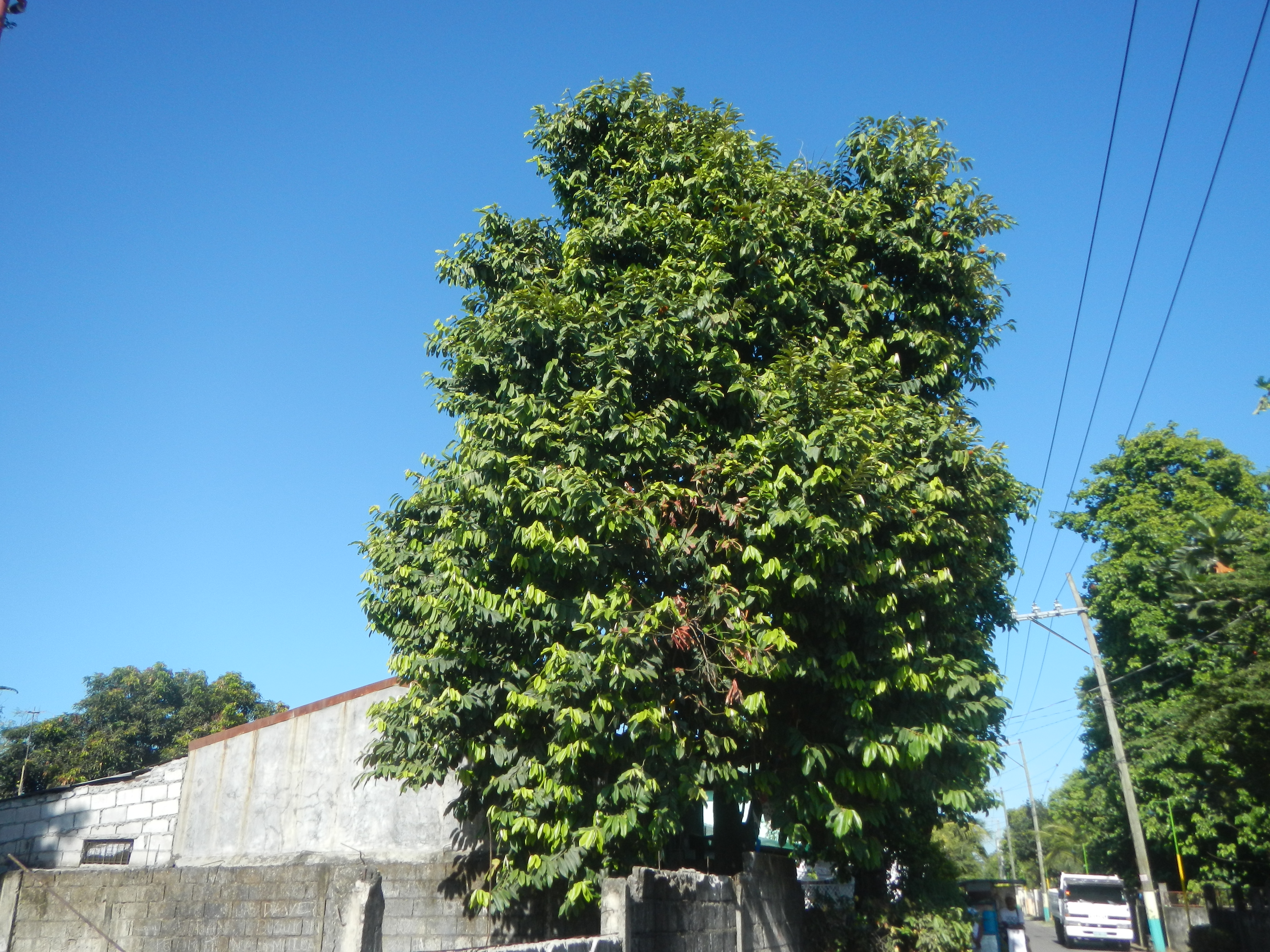
Diospyros discolor in Central Luzon, Philippines

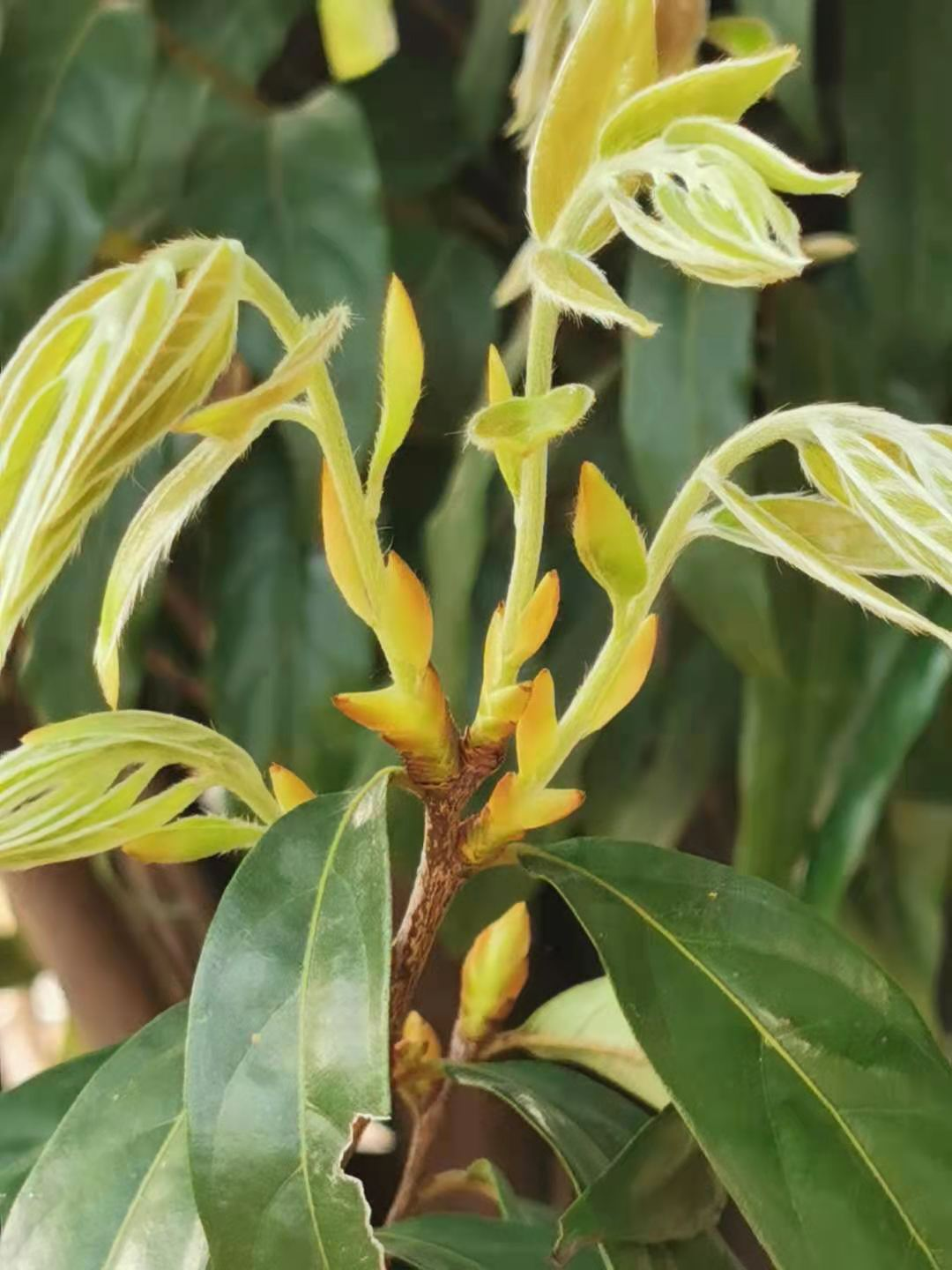
Diospyros eriantha foliage

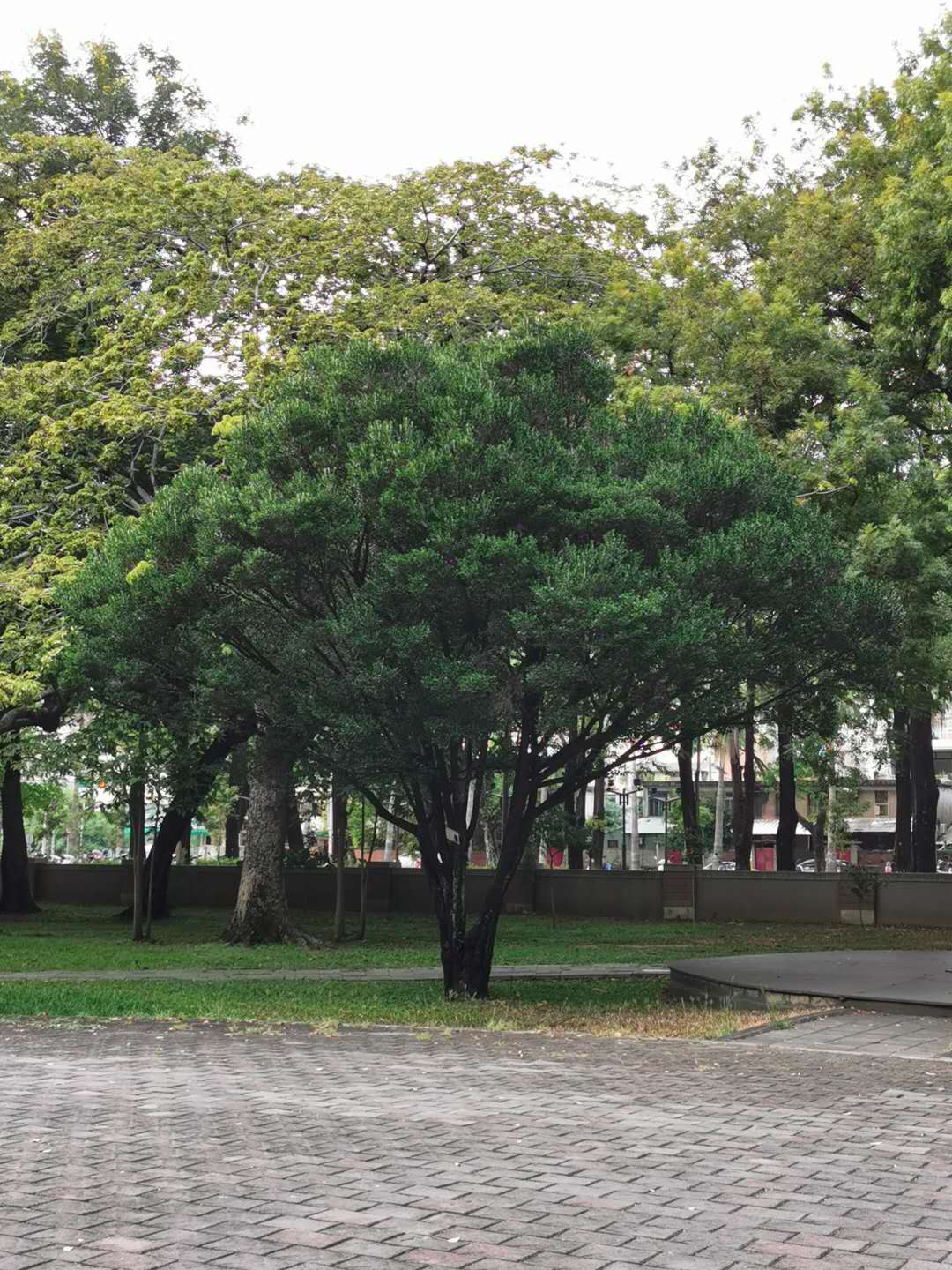
Diospyros ferrea, slow growth

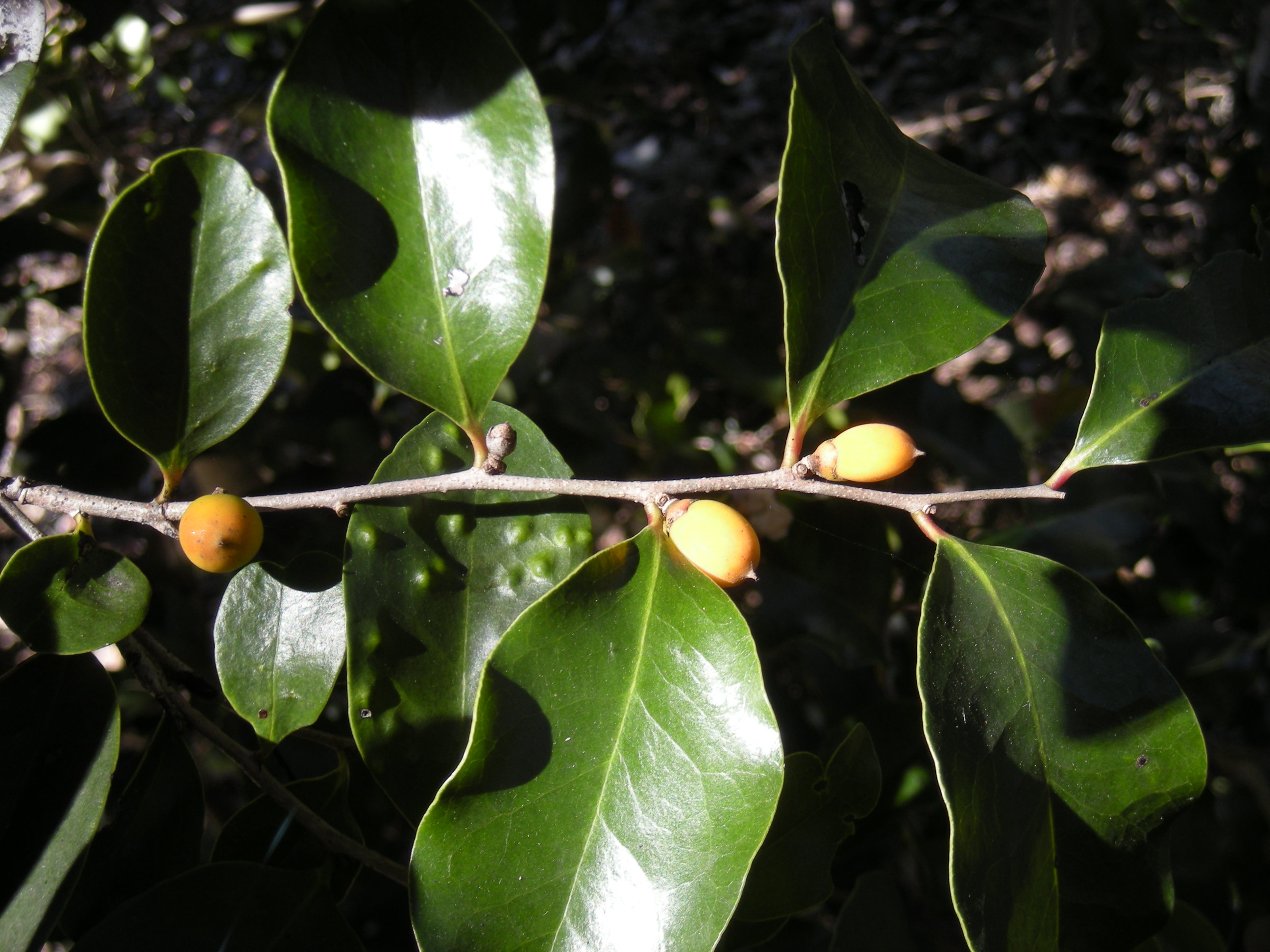
Diospyros geminata foliage and young fruit

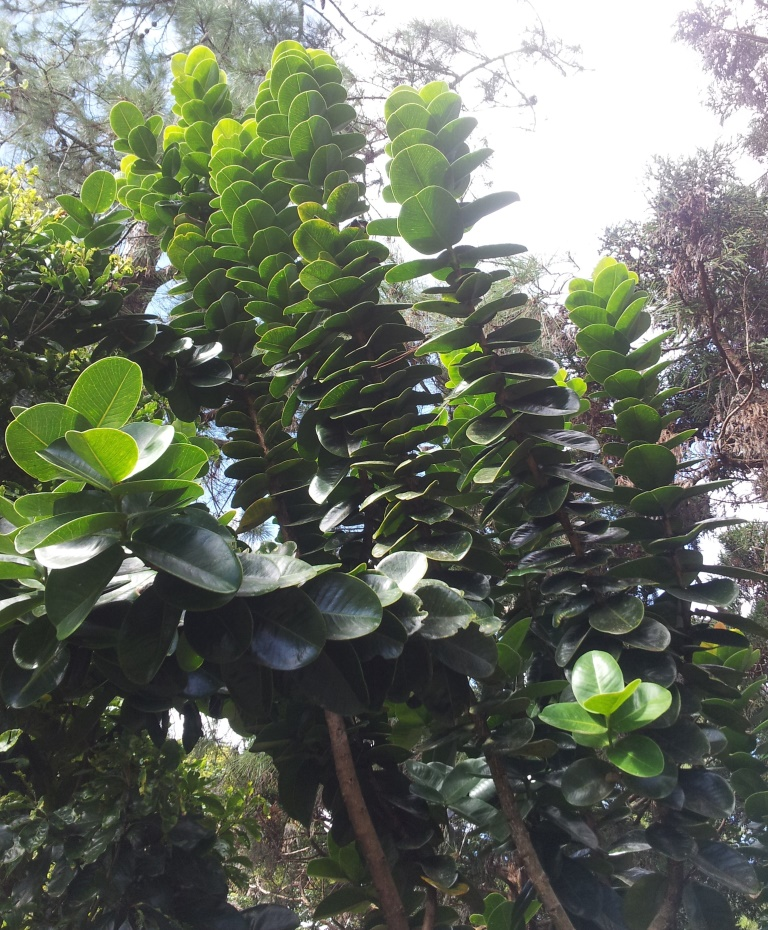
Diospyros revaughanii in Mauritius

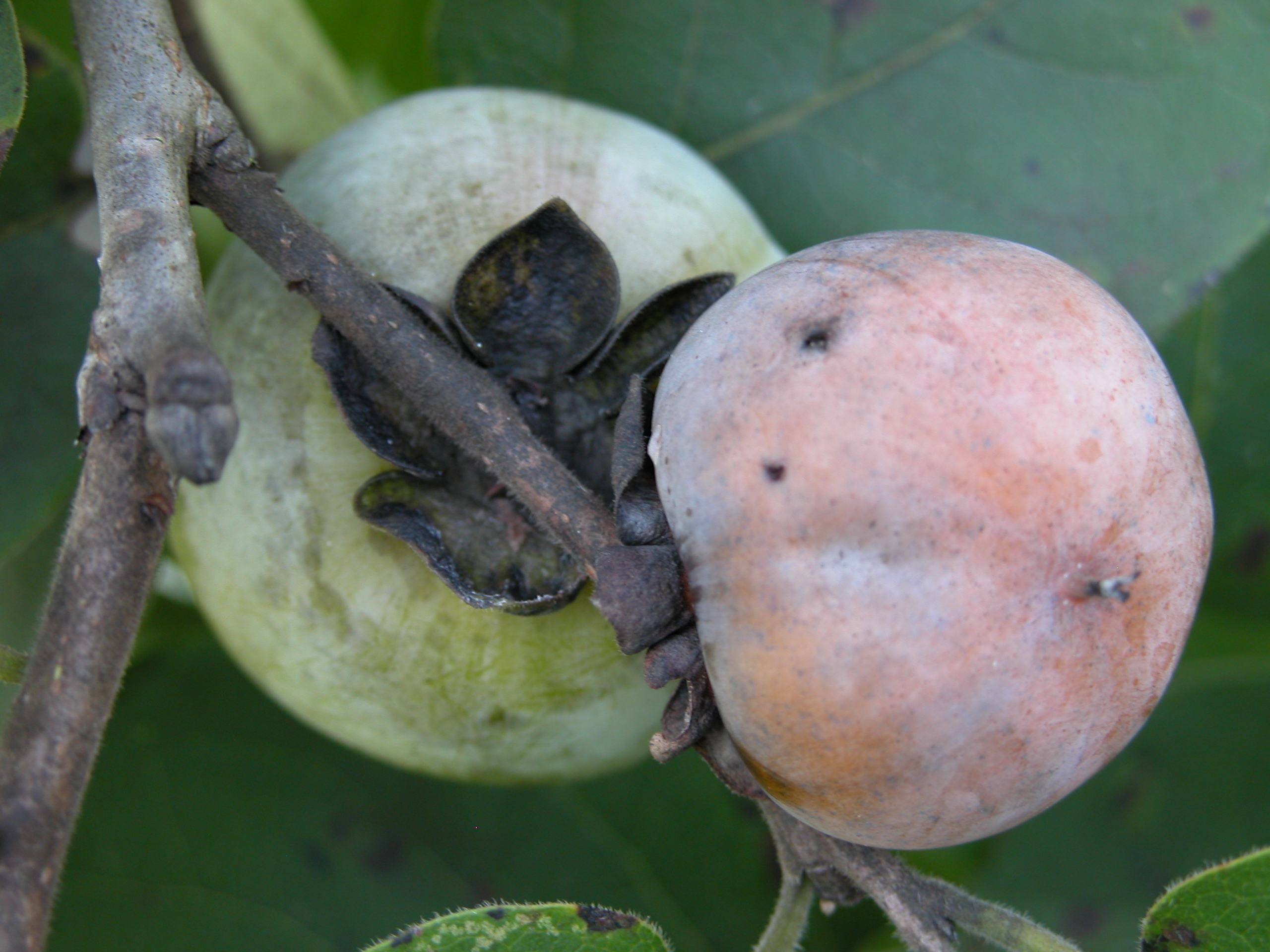
Diospyros virginiana in Tampa, Florida

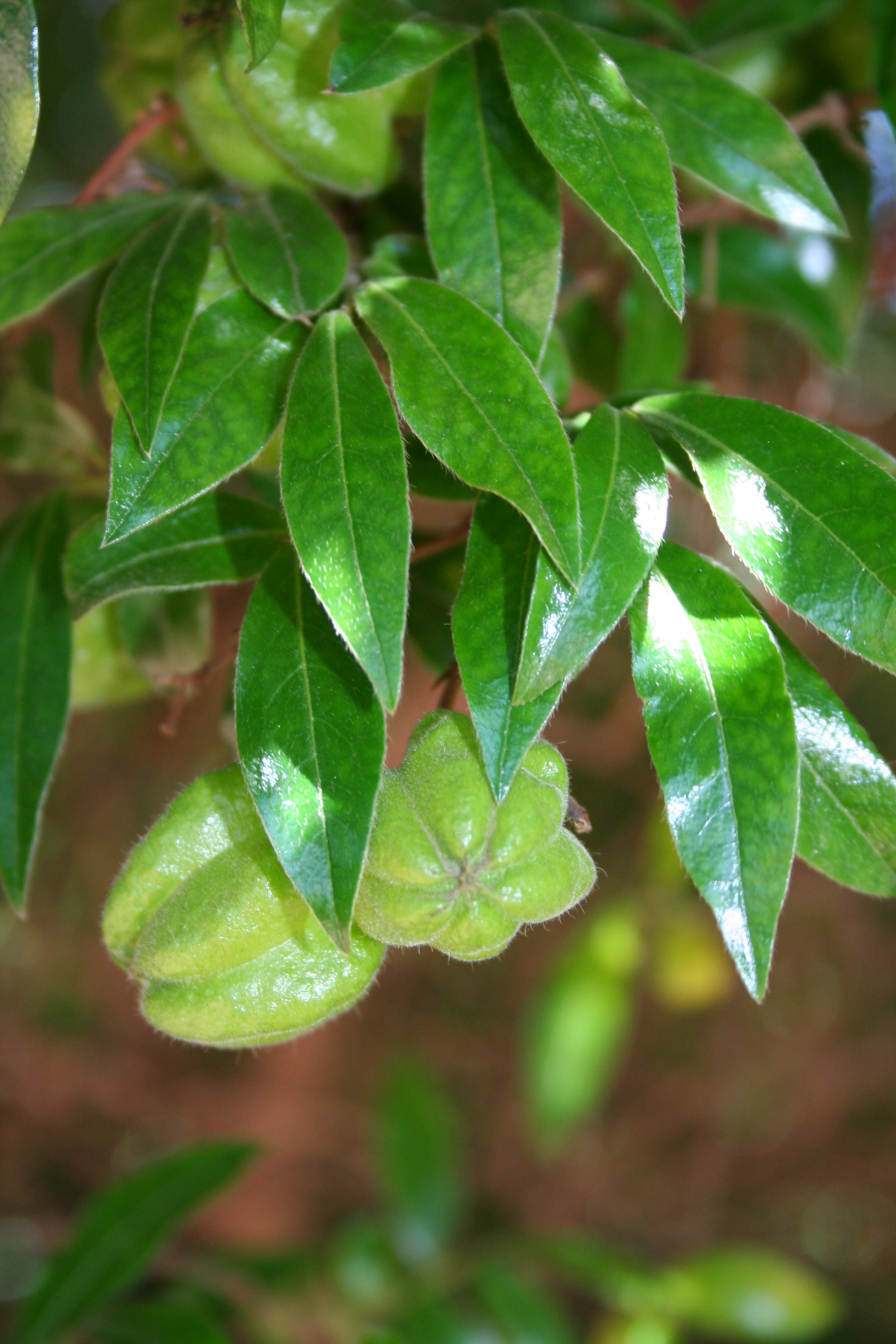
Diospyros whyteana twig with young fruit

- Diospyros abyssinica (Hiern) F.White
- Diospyros acuminata (Thwaites) Kosterm.
- Diospyros alatella Kosterm.
- Diospyros andamanica (Kurz) Bakh.
- Diospyros apiculata (R.Br.) Hiern
- Diospyros areolata King & Gamble
- Diospyros artanthifolia Mart. ex Miq.
- Diospyros atrata (Thwaites) Alston
- Diospyros attenuata Thwaites
- Diospyros australis (R.Br.) Hiern – yellow persimmon, black plum, "grey plum"
- Diospyros beccarioides Ng
- Diospyros blancoi A.DC. – kamagong, mabolo, butter fruit, velvet-apple
- Diospyros borneensis Hiern
- Diospyros britannoborneensis Bakh.
- Diospyros buxifolia (Blume) Hiern
- Diospyros cambodiana Lecomte
- Diospyros candolleana Wight
- Diospyros celebica Bakh. – Makassar ebony
- Diospyros chaetocarpa Kosterm.
- Diospyros chamaethamnus Mildbr. – sand apple
- Diospyros chloroxylon Roxb.
- Diospyros clementium Bakh.
- Diospyros confertiflora (Hiern) Bakh.
- Diospyros cordata (Hiern) Bakh.
- Diospyros coriacea Hiern
- Diospyros crassiflora Hiern – Gaboon ebony, Gabon ebony, African ebony, West African ebony, Benin ebony
- Diospyros crockerensis Ng
- Diospyros curranii Merr.
- Diospyros daemona Bakh.
- Diospyros decandra Lour. – gold apple
- Diospyros dichrophylla (Gand.) De Winter
- Diospyros dictyoneura Hiern
- Diospyros diepenhorstii Miq.
- Diospyros discocalyx Merr.
- Diospyros duclouxii
- Diospyros ebenum J.Koenig ex Retz. – Ceylon ebony, India ebony, "ebony"
- Diospyros elliptifolia Merr.
- Diospyros eriantha Champ. ex Benth.
- Diospyros eucalyptifolia Bakh.
- Diospyros euphlehia Merr.
- Diospyros evena Bakh.
- Diospyros everettii Merr.
- Diospyros fasciculosa (F.Muell.) F.Muell.
- Diospyros ferox Bakh.
- Diospyros ferrea (Willd.) Bakh.
- Diospyros ferruginescens Bakh.
- Diospyros foxworthyi Bakh.
- Diospyros frutescens Blume
- Diospyros fusiformis Kosterm.
- Diospyros geminata (R.Br.) F.Muell.
- Diospyros hallieri Bakh.
- Diospyros havilandii Bakh.
- Diospyros hebecarpa A.Cunn. ex Benth.
- Diospyros hillebrandii (Seem.) Fosberg
- Diospyros hirsuta L.f.
- Diospyros humilis (R.Br.) F.Muell. – Queensland ebony
- Diospyros inconstans Jacq.
- Diospyros insignis Thw.
- Diospyros insularis Bakh. – Papua ebony
- Diospyros kaki L.f. – Chinese persimmon, Japanese persimmon, kaki persimmon
- Diospyros keningauensis Ng
- Diospyros korthalsiana Hiern
- Diospyros kurzii Hiern – Andaman marblewood
- Diospyros lanceifolia Roxb.
- Diospyros lateralis Hiern
- Diospyros leucomelas Poir.
- Diospyros longibracteata Lecomte
- Diospyros lotus L. – date-plum, Caucasian persimmon, lilac persimmon
- Diospyros lunduensis Ng
- Diospyros lycioides Desf. – bushveld bluebush
  - subsp. guerkei (Kuntze) De Winter
  - subsp. nitens (Harv. ex Hiern) De Winter
  - subsp. sericea (Bernh.) De Winter
- Diospyros mabacea (F.Muell.) F.Muell. – red-fruited ebony
- Diospyros macrophylla Blume
- Diospyros maingayi (Hiern) Bakh.
- Diospyros major (G.Forst.) Bakh.
- Diospyros malabarica (Desr.) Kostel. – black-and-white ebony, pale moon ebony, Malabar ebony, gaub tree
- Diospyros maritima Blume
- Diospyros marmorata R.Parker
- Diospyros melanoxylon Roxb. – Coromandel ebony, East Indian ebony
  - var. tupru (Buch.-Ham.) V.Singh
- Diospyros mespiliformis Hochst. ex A.DC. – jackalberry, "African ebony"
- Diospyros mindanaensis Merr.
- Diospyros montana Roxb.
- Diospyros mun A.Chev. ex Lecomte – mun ebony
- Diospyros muricata Bakh.
- Diospyros neurosepala Bakh.
- Diospyros nigra (J.F.Gmel.) Perrier – black sapote, chocolate pudding fruit, "black persimmon"
- Diospyros oligantha Merr.
- Diospyros oocarpa Thwaites
- Diospyros oppositifolia Thwaites
- Diospyros ovalifolia Wight
- Diospyros parabuxifolia Ng
- Diospyros pendula Hasselt ex Hassk.
- Diospyros penibukanensis Bakh.
- Diospyros pentamera (F.Muell.) Woods & F.Muell. – myrtle ebony, grey persimmon, black myrtle, grey plum
- Diospyros perfida Bakh.
- Diospyros pilosanthera Blanco
- Diospyros piscicapa Ridl.
- Diospyros plectosepala Hiern
- Diospyros puncticulosa Bakh.
- Diospyros pyrrhocarpa Miq.
- Diospyros quaesita Thwaites
- Diospyros revaughanii Rich.
- Diospyros rhombifolia Hemsl.
- Diospyros ridleyi Bakh.
- Diospyros rigida Hiern
- Diospyros rufa King & Gamble
- Diospyros sandwicensis (A.DC.) Fosberg
- Diospyros seychellarum (Hiern) Kosterm.
- Diospyros siamang Bakh.
- Diospyros simaloerensis Bakh.
- Diospyros singaporensis Bakh.
- Diospyros squamifolia Kosterm.
- Diospyros squarrosa Klotzsch – rigid star-berry
- Diospyros styraciformis King & Gamble
- Diospyros subrhomboidea King & Gamble
- Diospyros subtruncata Hochr.
- Diospyros sulcata Bourd.
- Diospyros sumatrana Miq.
- Diospyros tessellaria Poir. – Mauritius ebony
- Diospyros texana Scheele – Texas persimmon, Mexican persimmon, "black persimmon"
- Diospyros thwaitesii (Hiern) Bedd.
- Diospyros toposia Buch.-Ham.
- Diospyros tuberculata Bakh.
- Diospyros ulo Merr.
- Diospyros venosa Wall. ex A.DC.
  - var. olivacea (King & Gamble) Ng
- Diospyros virginiana L. – American persimmon, eastern persimmon, common persimmon, possumwood, "simmon", "sugar-plum"
- Diospyros walkeri (Wight) Gürke
- Diospyros wallichii King & Gamble
- Diospyros whyteana (Hiern) P.White – Cape ebony

=== Etymology ===
The generic name Diospyros comes from a Latin name for the Caucasian persimmon (D. lotus), derived from the Greek διόσπυρος : dióspyros, from diós (Διός) and pyrós (πῡρός). The Greek name literally means 'Zeus's wheat' but more generally intends 'divine food' or 'divine fruit'.

== Distribution and habitat ==
Most species are native to the tropics, with only a few extending into temperate regions.

== Ecology ==
Diospyros species are important and conspicuous trees in many of their native ecosystems, such as lowland dry forests of the former Maui Nui in Hawaii, Caspian Hyrcanian mixed forests, Khathiar–Gir dry deciduous forests, Louisiade Archipelago rain forests, Madagascar lowland forests, Narmada Valley dry deciduous forests, New Caledonian sclerophytic vegetation, New Guinea mangroves or South Western Ghats montane rain forests.

The green fruits are avoided by most herbivores, perhaps because they are rich in tannins. When ripe, they are eagerly eaten by many animals however, such as (in East Africa) the rare Aders' duiker (Cephalophus adersi). The foliage is used as food by the larvae of numerous Lepidoptera species:

Arctiidae:

- Eupseudosoma aberrans
- Eupseudosoma involutum (snowy eupseudosoma)
- Hypercompe indecisa

Geometridae:

- Gymnoscelis rufifasciata (double-striped pug) – recorded on persimmons

Limacodidae:

- Monema flavescens

Lycaenidae:

- Neopithecops zalmora (Quaker)

Nymphalidae:

- Charaxes khasianus (Kihansi charaxes) – recorded on D. natalensis
- Dophla evelina (redspot duke) – recorded on D. candolleana

Saturniidae:

- Actias luna (Luna moth) – recorded on persimmons
- Callosamia promethea (promethea silkmoth) – recorded on persimmons
- Citheronia regalis (regal moth) – recorded on American persimmon (D. virginiana)

Tortricidae:

- "Cnephasia" jactatana (black-lyre leafroller moth)

An economically significant plant pathogen infecting many Diospyros species – D. hispida, kaki persimmon (D. kaki), date-plum (D. lotus), Texas persimmon (D. texana), Coromandel ebony (D. melanoxylon) and probably others – is the sac fungus Pseudocercospora kaki, which causes a leaf spot disease.

== Uses ==
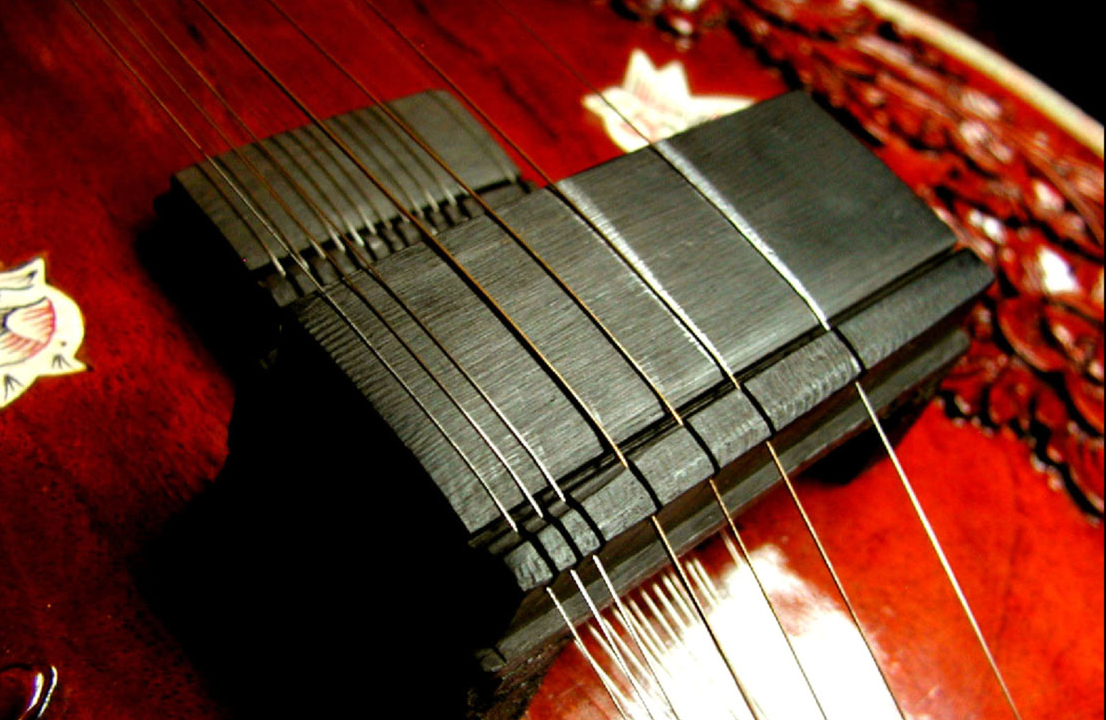
Ebony jivari of a sitar

The genus includes several plants of commercial importance, either for their edible fruit (persimmons) or for their timber (ebony). The latter are divided into two groups in trade: the pure black ebony (notably from D. ebenum, but also several other species), and the striped ebony or calamander wood (from D. celebica, D. mun and others). Most species in the genus produce little to none of this black ebony-type wood; their hard timber (e.g. of American persimmon, D. virginiana) may still be used on a more limited basis.

The leaves of Diospyros blancoi have been shown to contain isoarborinol methyl ether (also called cylindrin) and fatty esters of α- and β-amyrin. Both isoarborinol methyl ether and the amyrin mixture demonstrated antimicrobial activity against Escherichia coli, Pseudomonas aeruginosa, Candida albicans, Staphylococcus aureus, and Trichophyton interdigitale. Anti-inflammatory and analgesic properties have also been shown for the isolated amyrin mixture.

Leaves of the Coromandel ebony (D. melanoxylon) are used to roll South Asian beedi cigarettes. Several species are used in herbalism, and D. leucomelas yields the versatile medical compound betulinic acid. Extracts from Diospyros plants have also been proposed as novel anti-viral treatment. Though bees do not play a key role as pollinators, in plantations Diospyros may be of some use as honey plants. D. mollis, locally known as mặc nưa, is used in Vietnam to dye the famous black lãnh Mỹ A silk of Tân Châu district.

== In culture ==
The reverence for these trees in their native range is reflected by their use as floral emblems. In Indonesia, D. celebica (Makassar ebony, known locally as eboni) is the provincial tree of Central Sulawesi, while ajan kelicung (D. macrophylla) is that of West Nusa Tenggara. The emblem of the Japanese island of Ishigaki is the Yaeyama kokutan (D. ferrea). The Gold apple (D. decandra), called "Trái thị" in Vietnamese, is a tree in the Tấm Cám fable. It is also the provincial tree of Chanthaburi as well as Nakhon Pathom Provinces in Thailand, while the black-and-white ebony (D. malabarica) is that of Ang Thong Province. The name of the Thai district Amphoe Tha Tako, literally means "District of the Diospyros pier", the latter being a popular local gathering spot.

== See also ==
- Adriaan van Royen
- Ebonol
- Tonewood
