= Diospyros parabuxifolia =

Conservation status
- Endangered (IUCN 3.1)

Scientific classification
- Kingdom: Plantae
- Clade: Tracheophytes
- Clade: Angiosperms
- Clade: Eudicots
- Clade: Asterids
- Order: Ericales
- Family: Ebenaceae
- Genus: Diospyros
- Species: D. parabuxifolia

Binomial name
- Diospyros parabuxifolia Ng

Species of tree

Diospyros parabuxifolia is a tree in the family Ebenaceae. It grows up to 15 metres (50 ft) tall. The fruits are ellipsoid, up to 2 cm (1 in) in diameter. The specific epithet parabuxifolia is from the Greek meaning 'similar to Diospyros buxifolia'. Its habitat is lower montane forests from 1,000 metres (3,300 ft) to 1,500 metres (5,000 ft) altitude. Diospyros parabuxifolia is endemic to Borneo and confined to Sarawak.
