= Diospyros oppositifolia =

Conservation status
- Endangered (IUCN 2.3)

Scientific classification
- Kingdom: Plantae
- Clade: Tracheophytes
- Clade: Angiosperms
- Clade: Eudicots
- Clade: Asterids
- Order: Ericales
- Family: Ebenaceae
- Genus: Diospyros
- Species: D. oppositifolia

Binomial name
- Diospyros oppositifolia (Thw.)

Synonyms
- Euclea oppositifolia (Thwaites) P.E.Parm.

Species of tree

Diospyros oppositifolia is a species of tree in the ebony family, Ebenaceae. It is endemic to Sri Lanka.

== Distribution ==
The tree is limited to southwestern Sri Lanka. It has been noted in local forest reserves, such as Sinharaja Biosphere Reserve.

== Habitat and ecology ==
The tree grows in lowland rainforest habitat.

== Threats ==
This is an endangered species threatened by slash-and-burn and logging practices.

== External resources ==
- Herbarium specimen
