= Diospyros venosa =

Conservation status
- Least Concern (IUCN 3.1)

Scientific classification
- Kingdom: Plantae
- Clade: Tracheophytes
- Clade: Angiosperms
- Clade: Eudicots
- Clade: Asterids
- Order: Ericales
- Family: Ebenaceae
- Genus: Diospyros
- Species: D. venosa

Binomial name
- Diospyros venosa Wall. ex A.DC.

Synonyms
- Maba venosa (Wall. ex A.DC.) King & Gamble

Species of flowering plant

Diospyros venosa is a tree in the family Ebenaceae. It is native to Southeast Asia, from the Maluku Islands to Myanmar. It provides raw material for handicrafts, traditional medicine and fuel.

== Description ==
Diospyros venosa grows as a tree, sometimes a shrub, from 5–20 metres (20–70 ft) tall. Inflorescences bear up to 25 flowers. The fruits are ellipsoid to roundish, up to 2.5 cm (1 in) in diameter.

== Taxonomy ==
The specific epithet venosa is from the Latin meaning 'veined', referring to the leaf.

D. venosa has an accepted infraspecific variety, D. venosa var. olivacea.

Within the genus Diospyros, there is the geographically heterogenous clade XI, with sister species from India, Sri Lanka, Southeast Asia and New Caledonia. D. venosa is a member along with D. ebenum, D. ehretioides, D. fasciculosa, D. maritima, D. pubicalyx, D. styraciformis, and D. wallichii.

== Distribution ==
Diospyros venosa var. venosa is native to the Maluku Islands, Borneo, Java, Sumatra, Peninsular Malaysia, Thailand, Cambodia and Myanmar.

The var. olivacea is endemic to Peninsular Malaysia.

== Habitat ==
Its habitat is lowland mixed dipterocarp forests, though it occurs up to 1300m elevation. In the Guning Aias Forest Reserve, Pahang, Malaysia, the Lowland dipterocarp forest has a 30-40m tall canopy of trees in the Anacardiaceae, Dipterocarpaceae, Euphorbiaceae, Fabaceae, Sapotaceae, and Sterculiaceae families. Amongst the understorey plants is D. venosa var. venosa. Within the Ayer Hitam Forest Reserve, Selangor, D. venosa grows as a tree to 10m height, throughout the reserves from the Lowland dipterocarp forest to the lower montane forest at 1300m. The tree/shrub was one of the characteristic plants in the upper elevations (375-450m) ridge and slope community within the Seraya-ridge forest of the Semangkok Forest Reserve, Selangor, Malaysia. The seraya-ridge forest is a subtype of Hill dipterocarp forest, characterised by the dipterocarp Shorea curtisii and the palm Eugeissona tristis, the most common type of hill forest in Peninsular Malaysia.

== Vernacular names ==
In Malaysia it is known as kayu arang (a general name for Diospyros species). In the Khmer language, angɔt kmao and ângkât' khmau slëk thôm refer to the plant.

== Uses ==
Twigs from the plant are used as firewood. The ebony-like wood is used to make luxury knick-knacks. The roots are used in a traditional medicine decoction as a sedative, as well as a component of a tonic. Villagers living on the plateau of Phnom Kulen National Park, in Svay Leu District, Siem Reap Province, northwestern Cambodia, use the root and wood chips of the shrub in their traditional medicinal practices to improve post-partum care and circulation, to treat malaria, and to treat sexually transmitted diseases in women.
