= Wallichii =

Wallichii, a specific epithet honouring Danish botanist Nathaniel Wallich, may refer to:

== Plants ==
- Allium wallichii, commonly known as Jimbur or Himalaya onion
- Apostasia wallichii, a species of orchid
- Bulbophyllum wallichii, a species of orchid
- Castanopsis wallichii, a species of plant in the family Fagaceae
- Dioscorea wallichii, a climber in the family Dioscoreaceae
- Diospyros wallichii, a tree in the family Ebenaceae
- Dombeya wallichii, commonly known as pinkball, pink ball tree, or tropical hydrangea
- Horsfieldia wallichii, a species of plant in the family Myristicaceae
- Ligusticum wallichii, a flowering plant in the carrot family known for its use in traditional Chinese medicine
- Memecylon wallichii, a species of plant in the family Melastomataceae
- Rhododendron wallichii, a rhododendron species
- Schima wallichii, an Asian species of evergreen trees belonging to the tea family, Theaceae
- Sorbus wallichii, a species of plant in the family Rosaceae
- Strobilanthes wallichii, commonly known as Kashmir acanthus, hardy Persian shield, wild petunia, or kandali
- Valeriana wallichii, an herb of the family Valerianaceae, also called Indian valerian or tagar-ganthoda
- Widdringtonia wallichii, commonly known as Clanwilliam cedar or Clanwilliam cypress (correct name Widdringtonia cedarbergensis)

== Animals ==
- Brahmaea wallichii, a moth in the family Brahmaeidae
- Catreus wallichii, commonly known as the cheer pheasant or Wallich's pheasant
- Thysia wallichii, a beetle in the family Cerambycidae
