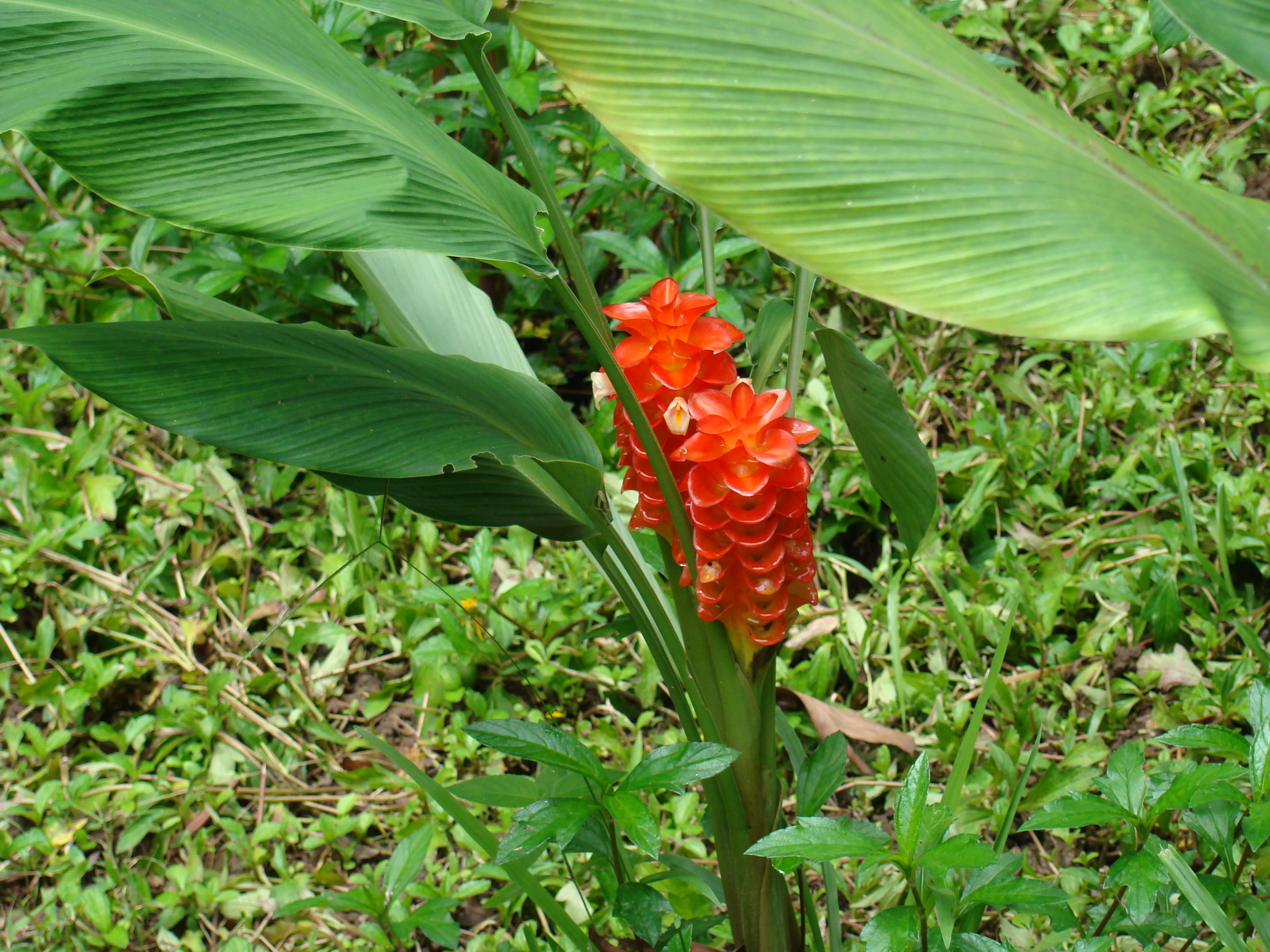

Scientific classification
- Kingdom: Plantae
- Clade: Tracheophytes
- Clade: Angiosperms
- Clade: Monocots
- Clade: Commelinids
- Order: Zingiberales
- Family: Zingiberaceae
- Genus: Curcuma
- Species: C. roscoeana

Binomial name
- Curcuma roscoeana Wall.

= Curcuma roscoeana =

Species of flowering plant

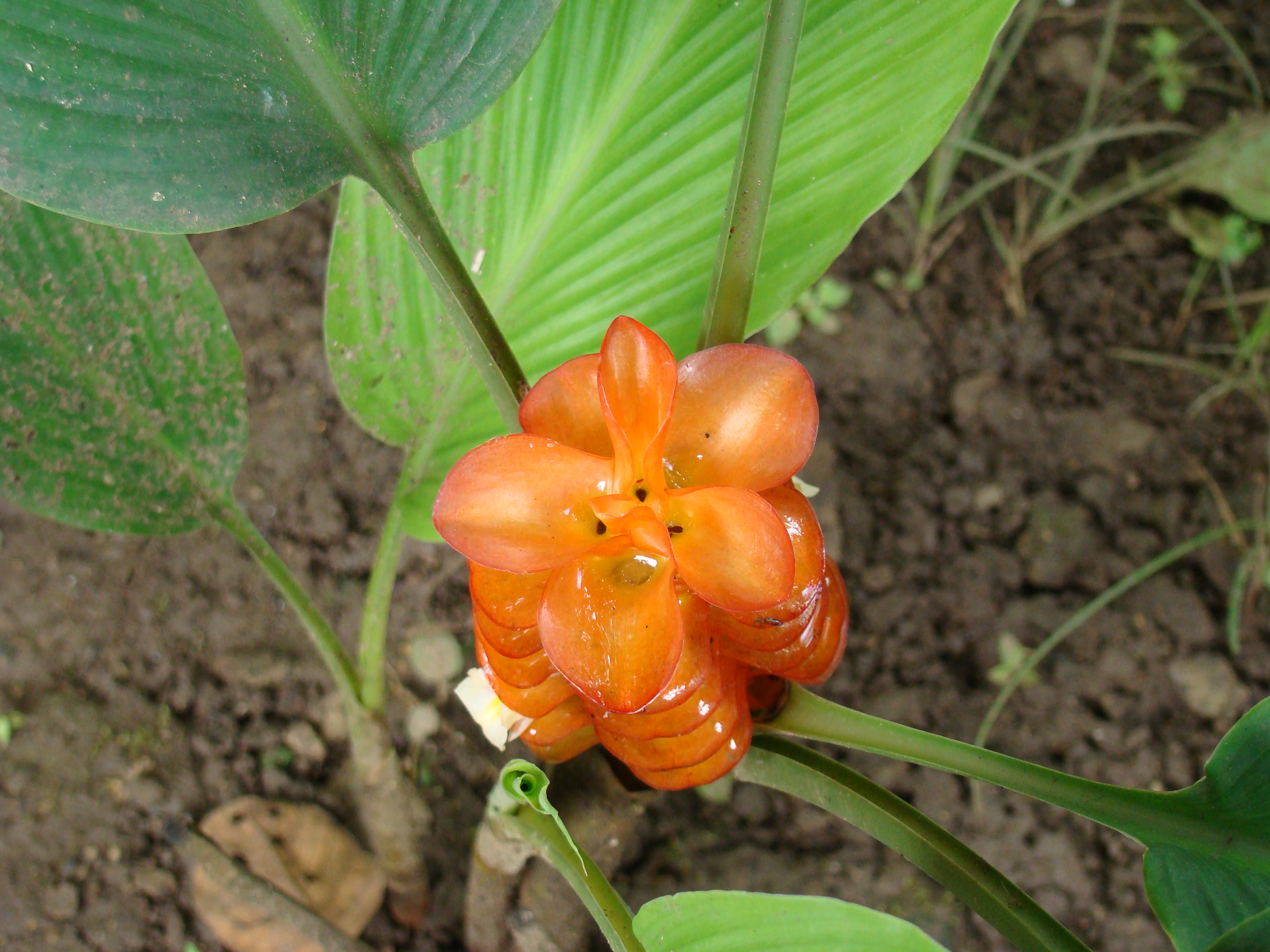

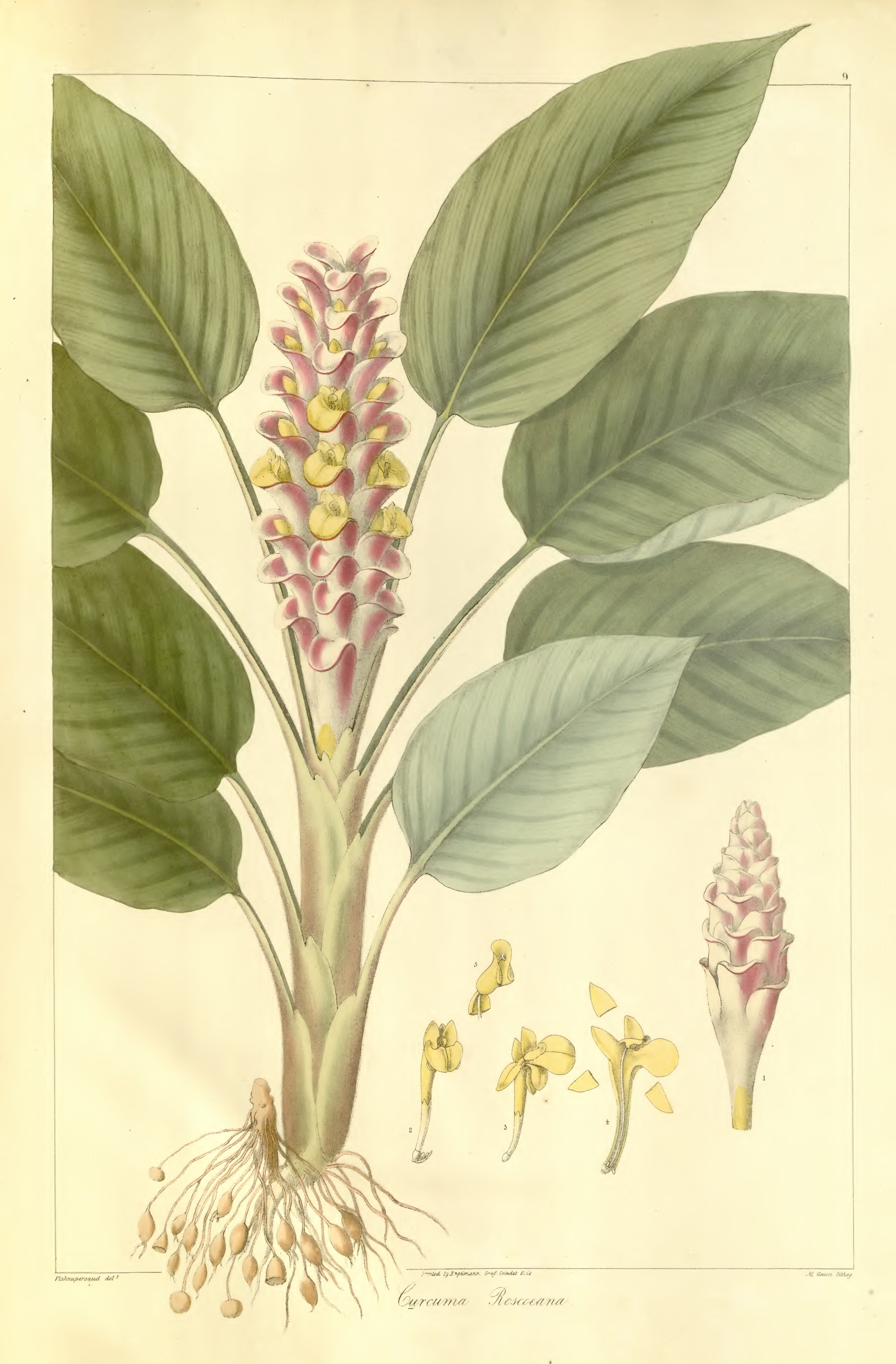
Illustration from Plantae Asiaticae Rariores, including detailed roots, petals, etc.

Curcuma roscoeana (also known as jewel of Burma, orange ginger, orange hidden ginger, pride of Burma or Burmese hidden lily) is a plant of the Zingiberaceae or ginger family.

It is native to Burma, India, Southeast Asia and Malaysia; its wild habitat is threatened.

Average height 2–3 feet. Flowers cone-shaped, bright orange or yellow, 4-5 inches. Blooms summer, fall. Bracts peach-orange to dark read-orange. Leaves broadly ovate to elliptic, light green, with darker veins, up to 12 inches long.

It is widely cultivated as an ornamental plant for its beautiful flowers. It is one of the most popular curcumas.

Synonyms include: Curcuma kurzii King ex Baker; Curcuma coccinea Wall. ex Baker, nom. nud.; Hitchenia roscoeana Wall.; Hitcheniopsis roscoeana Wall.
