= Bulbophyllum dickasonii =

Scientific classification
- Kingdom: Plantae
- Clade: Tracheophytes
- Clade: Angiosperms
- Clade: Monocots
- Order: Asparagales
- Family: Orchidaceae
- Subfamily: Epidendroideae
- Genus: Bulbophyllum
- Section: Bulbophyllum sect. Tripudianthes
- Species: B. dickasonii

Binomial name
- Bulbophyllum dickasonii Seidenf.

Synonyms
- Tripudianthes dickasonii (Seidenf.) Szlach. & Kras 2007

Species of orchid

Bulbophyllum dickasonii is a species of orchid in the genus Bulbophyllum.

== Distribution ==
Plants are found growing in China (Yunnan), India (Manipur), and Myanmar (Ranpetlet) at elevations of 1100 to 1434 meters. Plants are found growing in subtropical forest growing epiphytically along with Dendrobium fimbriatum, Dendrobium chrysotoxum, and Pholidota articulata.
