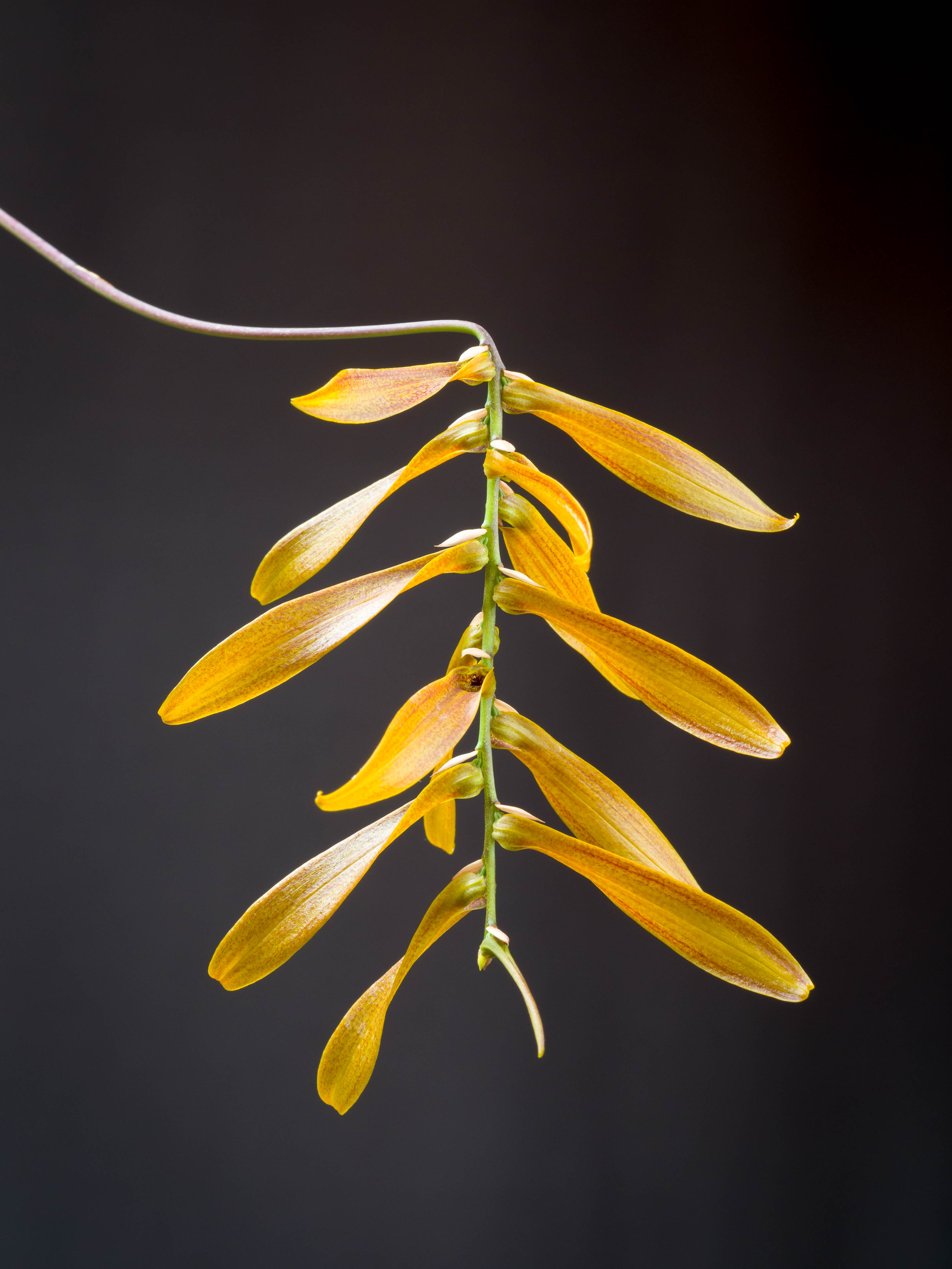

Scientific classification
- Kingdom: Plantae
- Clade: Tracheophytes
- Clade: Angiosperms
- Clade: Monocots
- Order: Asparagales
- Family: Orchidaceae
- Subfamily: Epidendroideae
- Genus: Bulbophyllum
- Section: Bulbophyllum sect. Tripudianthes
- Species: B. tripudians

Binomial name
- Bulbophyllum tripudians C. S. P. Parish & Rchb. f.

Synonyms
- Bulbophyllum tripudianthe J.M.H.Shaw 2016; Tripudianthes tripudians (C.S.P.Parish & Rchb.f.) Szlach. & Kras 2007

= Bulbophyllum tripudians =

Species of orchid

Bulbophyllum tripudians is a species of orchid in the genus Bulbophyllum.
