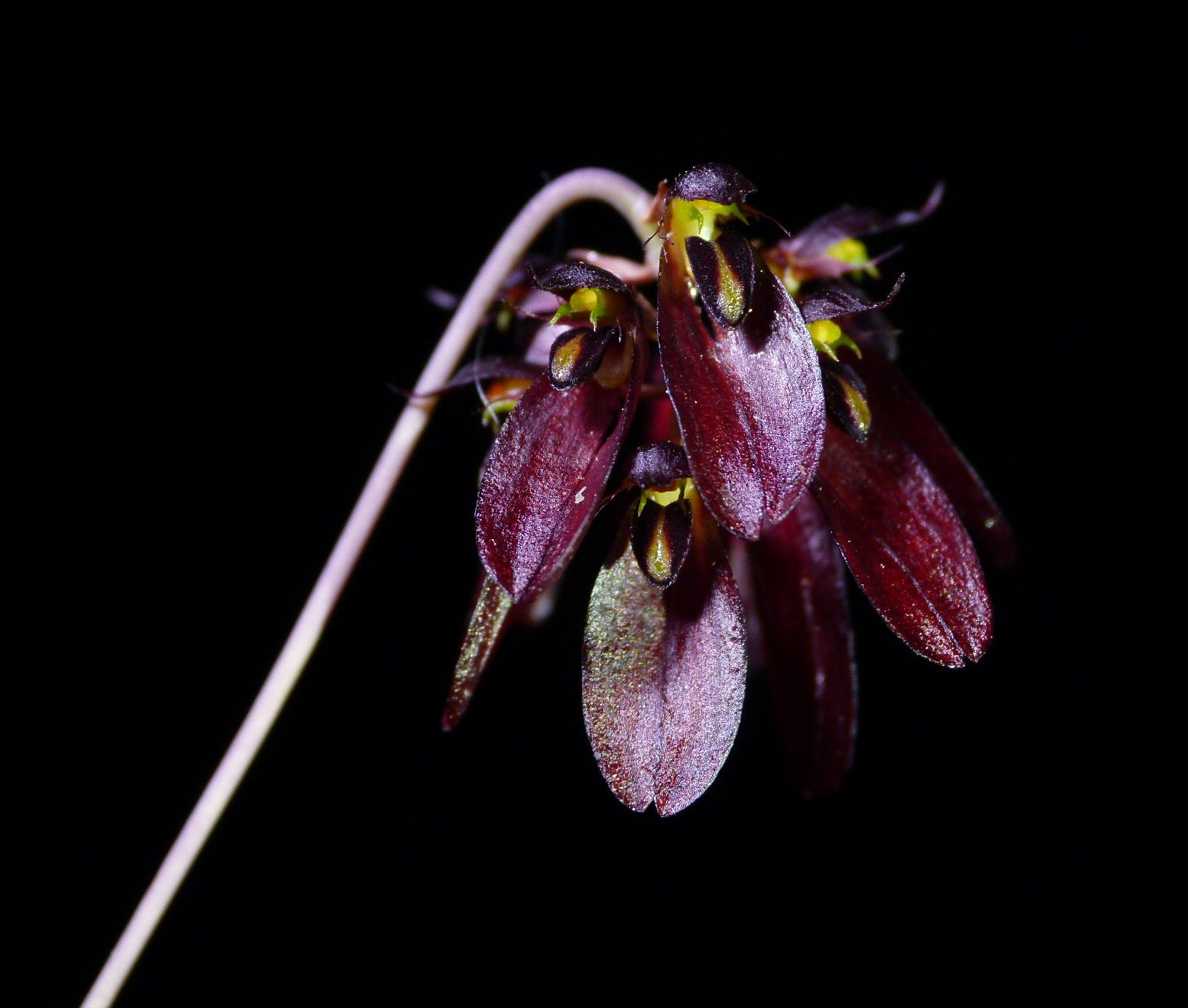

Scientific classification
- Kingdom: Plantae
- Clade: Tracheophytes
- Clade: Angiosperms
- Clade: Monocots
- Order: Asparagales
- Family: Orchidaceae
- Subfamily: Epidendroideae
- Genus: Bulbophyllum
- Section: Bulbophyllum sect. Tripudianthes
- Species: B. proudlockii

Binomial name
- Bulbophyllum proudlockii (King & Pantl.) J.J.Sm.

Synonyms
- Cirrhopetalum proudlockii King & Pantl.; Tripudianthes proudlockii (King & Pantl.) Szlach. & Kras

= Bulbophyllum proudlockii =

Species of orchid

Bulbophyllum proudlockii is a species of orchid in the family Orchidaceae.
