= Bulbophyllum kanburiense =

Scientific classification
- Kingdom: Plantae
- Clade: Tracheophytes
- Clade: Angiosperms
- Clade: Monocots
- Order: Asparagales
- Family: Orchidaceae
- Subfamily: Epidendroideae
- Genus: Bulbophyllum
- Section: Bulbophyllum sect. Tripudianthes
- Species: B. kanburiense

Binomial name
- Bulbophyllum kanburiense Seidenf.

Synonyms
- Tripudianthes kanburiensis (Seidenf.) Szlach. & Kras 2007

Species of orchid

Bulbophyllum kanburiense is a species of orchid in the genus Bulbophyllum.
