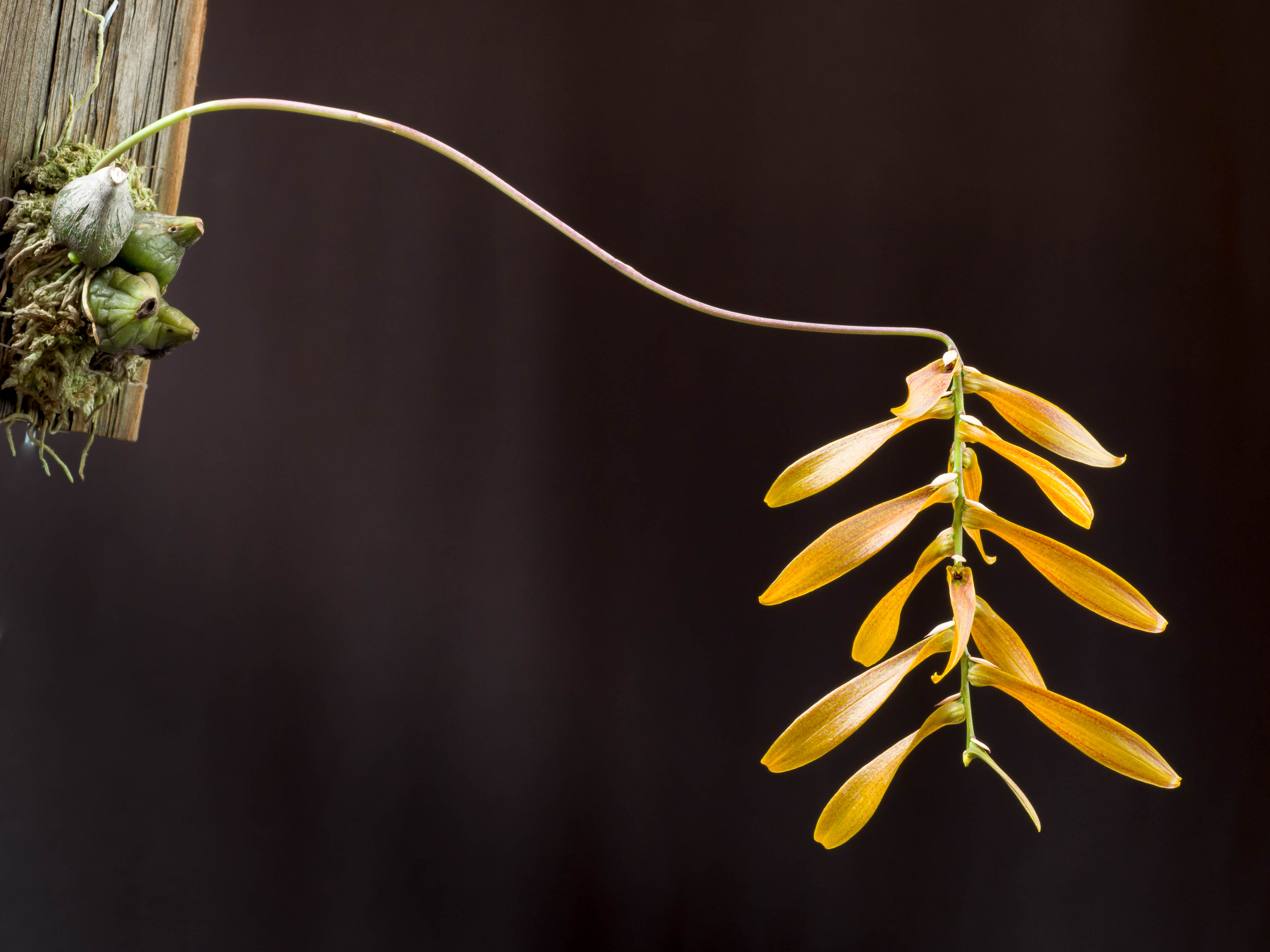
- Bulbophyllum tripudians

Scientific classification
- Kingdom: Plantae
- Clade: Tracheophytes
- Clade: Angiosperms
- Clade: Monocots
- Order: Asparagales
- Family: Orchidaceae
- Subfamily: Epidendroideae
- Genus: Bulbophyllum
- Section: Bulbophyllum sect. Tripudianthes; Seidenfaden 1979

Type species
- Bulbophyllum tripudians

Species
- See text

Synonyms
- Tripudianthes (Seidenfaden) Szlachetko & Kras. 2007

= Bulbophyllum sect. Tripudianthes =

Section of flowering plants

Bulbophyllum sect. Tripudianthes is a section of the genus Bulbophyllum.

== Description ==
Species in this section are bifoliate, deciduous, and flower in the winter or spring.

== Distribution ==
Plants from this section are found in Southeast Asia.

== Species ==
Bulbophyllum section Tripudianthes comprises the following species:

Image	Name	Distribution	Elevation (m)
	Bulbophyllum dickasonii Seidenf. 1979	China (Yunnan), Myanmar, India (Manipur)	1,100–1,200 metres (3,600–3,900 ft)
	Bulbophyllum dresslerianum Z. D. Han & H. Wang 2023	China (Yunnan)	1,400 metres (4,600 ft)
	Bulbophyllum guttifilum Seidenf. 1996	Thailand	
	Bulbophyllum kanburiense Seidenf. 1970	Thailand, Myanmar and Vietnam	700–2,000 metres (2,300–6,600 ft)
	Bulbophyllum khaoyaiense Seidenf. 1970	Thailand, and China (Yunnan)	1,200–1,400 metres (3,900–4,600 ft)
	Bulbophyllum notabilipetalum Seidenf. 1995	Thailand	
	Bulbophyllum proudlockii (King & Pantl.) J.J.Sm. 1912	India	1,200–1,300 metres (3,900–4,300 ft)
	Bulbophyllum refractum [Zoll.]Rchb. f. 1861	India, Myanmar, Thailand, Vietnam, Java and Sumatra	0–1,420 metres (0–4,659 ft)
	Bulbophyllum rugosisepalum Seidenf 1979	Thailand	1,300 metres (4,300 ft)
	Bulbophyllum sanitii Seidenf. 1970	Thailand and Vietnam	1,350–1,700 metres (4,430–5,580 ft)
	Bulbophyllum tripudians Par. & Rchb.f. 1874	Laos, Myanmar, Thailand and Vietnam	1,000–1,420 metres (3,280–4,660 ft)
	Bulbophyllum viridiflorum (Hook.f.) Schltr. 1910	India (Assam), Nepal	2,000–2,300 metres (6,600–7,500 ft)
	Bulbophyllum wallichii Rchb.f. 1861	India( Assam), Bhutan, Sikkim, Nepal, Myanmar, Thailand and Vietnam	1,000–2,500 metres (3,300–8,200 ft)
