= Bulbophyllum refractum =

Scientific classification
- Kingdom: Plantae
- Clade: Tracheophytes
- Clade: Angiosperms
- Clade: Monocots
- Order: Asparagales
- Family: Orchidaceae
- Subfamily: Epidendroideae
- Genus: Bulbophyllum
- Section: Bulbophyllum sect. Tripudianthes
- Species: B. refractum

Binomial name
- Bulbophyllum refractum (Zoll.) Rchb.f.

Synonyms
- Cirrhopetalum refractum Zoll. 1847; Phyllorkis refracta (Zoll.) Kuntze 1891; Tripudianthes refracta (Zoll.) Szlach. & Kras 2007

Species of orchid

Bulbophyllum refractum is a species of orchid in the genus Bulbophyllum.

== Description ==
Pseudobulbs are 1.1–1.3 by 1.6–2.1 centimetres (0.43 in–0.51 in × 0.63 in–0.83 in), conical with two leaves. Leaves are narrowly laceolate, narrowly acute at the apex, deciduous, and 6.4–7.7 by 1–1.1 centimetres (2.52 in–3.03 in × 0.39 in–0.43 in). Inflorescence form from the base of the pseudobulb and is 13–23 centimetres (5.1–9.1 in) long with 4-12 flowers. Flowers are 3.75–6.75 centimetres (1.48–2.66 in) long with recurved triangular bracts that are acute and concave 0.475 by 0.27 centimetres (0.187 in × 0.106 in). The dorsal sepal is obtuse with five nerves and 1.1 by 0.5 centimetres (0.43 in × 0.20 in). Sepals are yellow orange triangular 5 by 6.75 centimetres (1.97 in × 2.66 in) The lip is purple and white, 0.34 by 0.17 centimetres (0.134 in × 0.067 in) is papillose.The column is short and has 4 unequal oval pollina. The flowers have a faint scent of hay.

Buds on Inflorescence

Flowers

Plant

== Distribution ==
This species is found in India (Sikkim), Myanmar, Thailand, Vietnam, Java and Sumatra at elevations of 0–1,420 metres (0–4,659 ft). The plants flower in habitat from October to November.
