= Bulbophyllum viridiflorum =

Scientific classification
- Kingdom: Plantae
- Clade: Tracheophytes
- Clade: Angiosperms
- Clade: Monocots
- Order: Asparagales
- Family: Orchidaceae
- Subfamily: Epidendroideae
- Genus: Bulbophyllum
- Section: Bulbophyllum sect. Tripudianthes
- Species: B. viridiflorum

Binomial name
- Bulbophyllum viridiflorum (Hook.f.) Schltr.

Synonyms
- Cirrhopetalum viridiflorum Hook.f. 1890; Phyllorkis viridiflora (Hook.f.) Kuntze 1891; Tripudianthes viridiflora (Hook.f.) Szlach. & Kras 2007

Species of orchid

Bulbophyllum viridiflorum is a species of orchid in the genus Bulbophyllum.
