= Bulbophyllum khaoyaiense =

Scientific classification
- Kingdom: Plantae
- Clade: Tracheophytes
- Clade: Angiosperms
- Clade: Monocots
- Order: Asparagales
- Family: Orchidaceae
- Subfamily: Epidendroideae
- Genus: Bulbophyllum
- Section: Bulbophyllum sect. Tripudianthes
- Species: B. khaoyaiense

Binomial name
- Bulbophyllum khaoyaiense Seidenf.

Synonyms
- Bulbophyllum tripudians var. pumilum Seidenf. & Smitinand 1965; Tripudianthes khaoyaiensis (Seidenf.) Szlach. & Kras 2007

Species of orchid

Bulbophyllum khaoyaiense is a species of orchid in the genus Bulbophyllum.
