= Nathaniel Wallich =

Danish surgeon and botanist (1786–1854)

Nathaniel Wulff Wallich
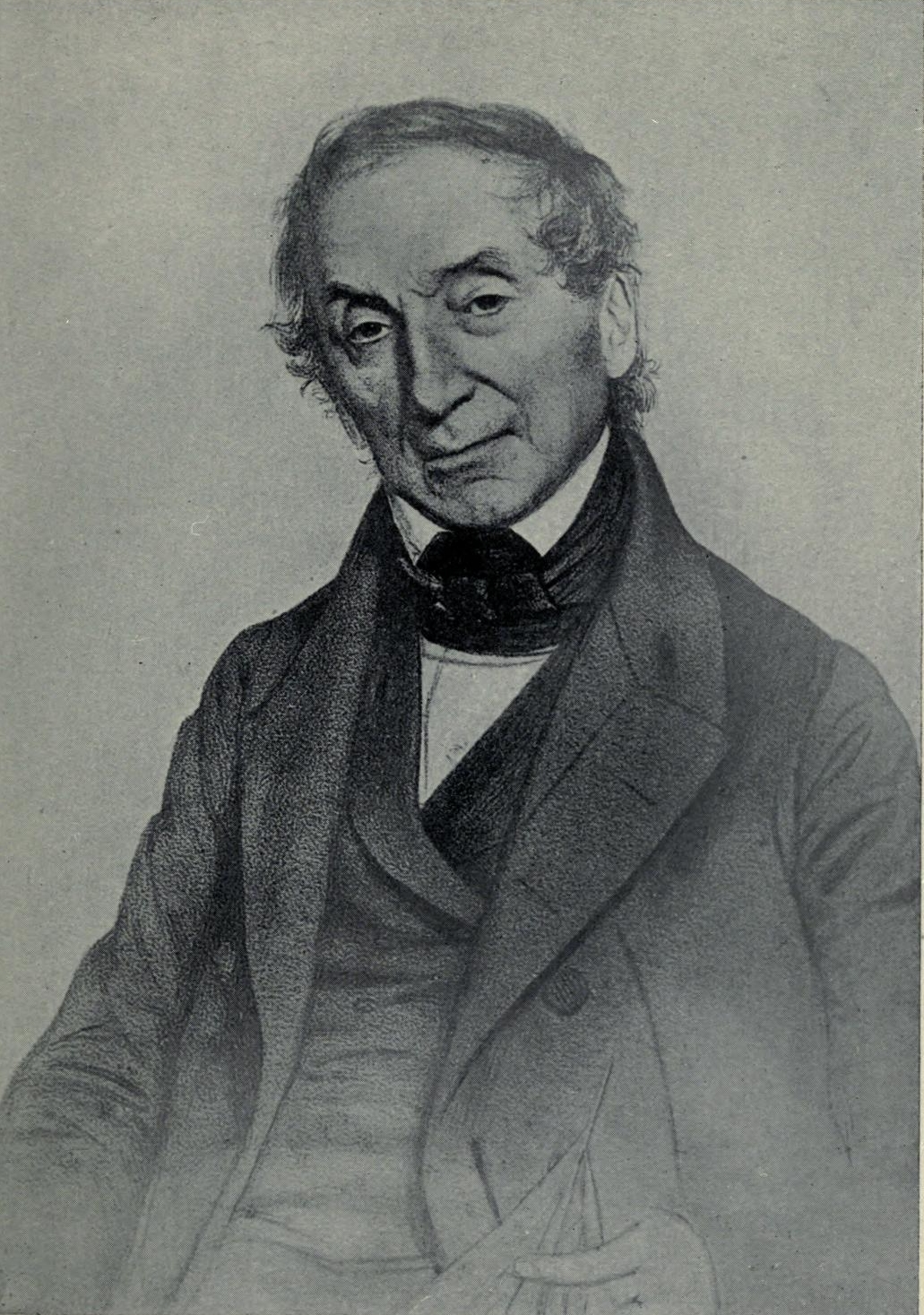
- Wallich, from an old lithograph by T. H. Maguire
- Born: Nathan ben Wulff; 28 January 1786; Copenhagen, Denmark
- Died: 28 April 1854 (aged 68); London, England
- Education: Royal Academy of Surgeons
- Known for: Tentamen Florae Nepalensis Illustratae; Plantae Asiaticae Rariores
- Scientific career
- Fields: Surgeon; Botanist
- Workplaces: Royal Academy of Surgeons; East India Company; Oriental Museum of the Asiatic Society
- Author abbrev. (botany): Wall.

Nathaniel Wolff Wallich FRS FRSE (28 January 1786 – 28 April 1854) was a surgeon and botanist of Danish origin who worked in India, initially in the Danish settlement near Calcutta and later for the Danish East India Company and the British East India Company. He was involved in the early development of the Calcutta Botanical Garden, describing many new plant species and developing a large herbarium collection which was distributed to collections in Europe. Several of the plants that he collected were named after him.

== Early life and education ==
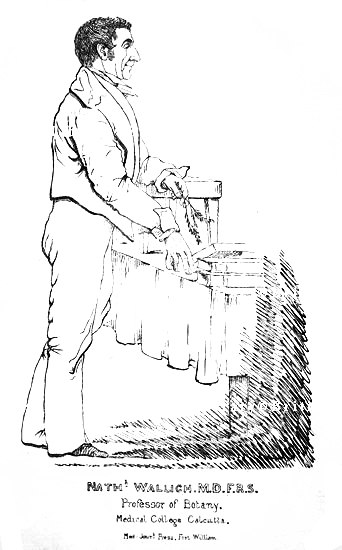
Portrait by Colesworthy Grant

Nathaniel Wallich was born in Copenhagen in 1786 as Nathan Wulff Wallich. His father Wulff Lazarus Wallich (1756–1843) was a Sephardic Jewish merchant originally from the Holsatian town Altona near Hamburg, who settled in Copenhagen late in the 18th century. His mother was Hanne née Jacobson (1757–1839).

Wallich attended the Royal Academy of Surgeons (Note: In the old Danish spelling "Chirurgiske Akademie", and "Kirurgiske Akademi".) in Copenhagen, where his professors trained in the botanical science included Erik Viborg, Martin Vahl, Heinrich Christian Friedrich Schumacher and Jens Wilken Hornemann. He obtained the diploma from the Academy in 1806, and at the end of the year was appointed as surgeon in the Danish settlement at Serampore, then known as Frederiksnagore in Bengal.

== Career ==
Wallich sailed for India in April 1807 via the African cape and arrived at Serampore the following November. However, the Danish alliance with Napoleonic France resulted in many Danish colonies being seized by the British, including the outpost at Frederiksnagore. When the British East India Company took over Frederiksnagore, (Note: Spelt "Frederichsnagor" in older literature; "Frederiksnagore" is the modernized spelling. "Frederischnagor" seems to be a typographical error.) Wallich was imprisoned, but released on parole in 1809 on the merit of his scholarship.

=== Service in East India Company ===
From August 1814, Wallich became an assistant surgeon in the East India Company's service and resigned as superintendent of the Indian Museum in December 1814.

=== First curator of Indian Museum ===
Wallich proposed the forming of a museum in a letter dated 2 February 1814 to the Council of the Asiatic Society. Wallich offered his services to the society and some items from his own collections for the museum. The society heartily supported the proposal and resolved to set up a museum and to appoint Wallich to be the honorary curator and then superintendent of the Oriental Museum of the Asiatic Society. Dr. Nathaniel Wallich took charge of the museum on 1 June 1814. The museum thus inaugurated, grew rapidly under the guidance of its founder Wallich and private collectors. Most of these private contributors were Europeans except for one Indian, Babu Ramkamal Sen, initially a collector and later the first Indian secretary to the Asiatic Society. Wallich was not only the enthusiastic founder and the first curator the Indian Museum, he was one of the largest donors to the museum at its inception. Out of one hundred seventy four items donated to the museum till 1816, Wallich donated forty-two botanical specimens.

=== Royal Botanical Garden, Calcutta ===
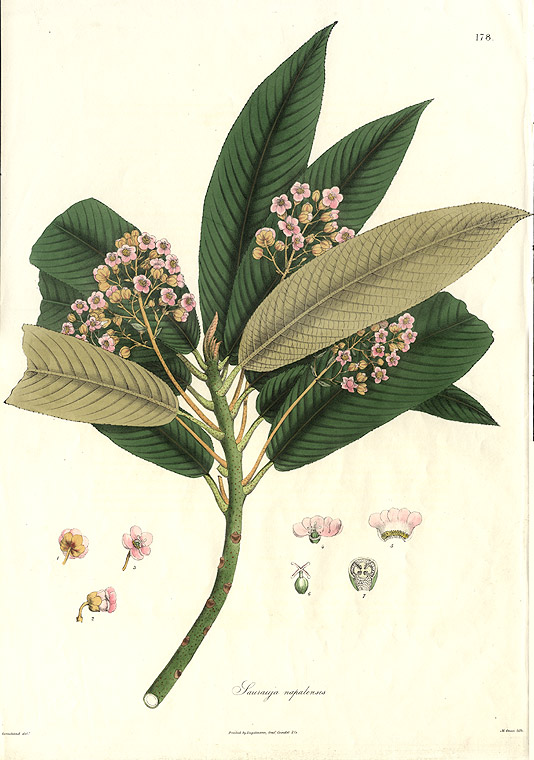
Saurauia nepalensis from Plantae Asiaticae Rariores

Wallich was also temporarily appointed superintendent of the Royal Botanic Garden, Calcutta, and later permanently joined the garden in 1817, and served there until 1846, when he retired from the service. Ill health forced Wallich to spend the years 1811–1813 in the more temperate climate of Mauritius, whence he continued his studies. In 1822, at the behest of his friend Sir Stamford Raffles he travelled to Singapore to design the botanical garden. While travelling to Singapore, Wallich fell ill and stayed at Botany Hall to recuperate. During his recuperation, Raffles persuaded him to write a report to the government to start a botanic and experimental garden in Singapore. In November, Wallich submitted a proposal for a botanical garden in Singapore. Wallich would returned to Calcutta the following year.

Wallich prepared a catalogue of more than 20,000 specimens, known informally as the "Wallich Catalogue". The specimens in the catalogue were either collected by Wallich himself or from other collectors around the same period, including Roxburgh, Gomez, Griffith and Wight. The collector of each specimen is clearly cited in the catalogue itself. Today, Wallich's personal collection is housed at the Kew Herbarium as the Wallich Collection. In addition to the specimens there, Wallich also distributed duplicates of his specimens to herbaria, including some to Sir Joseph Banks, which are in the Kew general collection.

He published two books, Tentamen Florae Nepalensis Illustratae and Plantae Asiaticae Rariores, and went on numerous expeditions. One of Wallich's greatest contributions to the field of plant exploration was the assistance he regularly offered to the many plant hunters who stopped in Calcutta on their way to the Himalayas.

The three volumes of Plantae Asiaticae Rariores made use of artists employed by the Calcutta Botanic Garden: 146 drawings by Gorachand, 109 by Vishnupersaud and one work by Rungiah (the artist employed by Robert Wight); the rest of the plates were by John Clark and three by William Griffith. Two hundred and fifty copies of the work were printed, of which 40 were purchased by the East India Company.

=== Scholarly distinctions ===
Wallich received an M.D. from Aberdeen in 1819. Wallich was later appointed assistant to William Roxburgh, the East India Company's botanist in Calcutta. By 1813 he had become interested in the flora of India, and undertook expeditions to Nepal (where he collected plant specimens in collaboration with William Moorcroft), West Hindustan, and lower Burma. During 1837 and 1838, Nathaniel Wallich served as professor of botany at Calcutta Medical College. Two years later in 1821, he was conferred the degree of honorary doctor at the University of Copenhagen and in 1826, elected member of the Royal Danish Academy of Sciences and Letters. Wallich became a freemason early in his Calcutta life.

He was elected a Fellow of the Royal Society of Edinburgh in 1822, his proposer being John Yule. This was followed in 1828 by his being elected a Fellow of the Royal Society of London.

=== Retirement, death, and legacy ===
Wallich had suffered deteriorating health for many years, at one time contracting cholera, and he was finally obliged to resign his post in 1846 and retire to London, where he became vice-president of the Linnean Society, of which he had been a fellow since 1818.

Wallich remained in London until his death seven years later. He died at Gower Street in Bloomsbury on 28 April 1854 aged 68. He was buried in Kensal Green Cemetery.

Part of Wallich's herbarium collections held at Kew, and known as the Wallich Herbarium, is the largest separate herbarium. Another part of the collection is the Central National Herbarium of the Botanical Survey of India in Calcutta, making in all about 20,500 specimens. Wallich is also credited with the authorship of 35 papers, mostly botanical.

When Wallich stayed at Botany Hall, a residence in Singapore, on top of a hill to recuperate from his illness, the hill was then named Mount Wallich after him.

== Personal life ==
Wallich's was the maternal uncle of the Danish zoologist Theodore Cantor. Wallich married Juliane Marie Hals (born 1797), later known as Mary Ann, on 30 May 1812, but she died only two months later. In 1815, Wallich married Sophia Collings (1797–1876). Together, they had seven children, two of whom died in infancy. Their eldest son George Charles became a distinguished oceanographer.

Some images of plates from Plantae Asiaticae Rariores

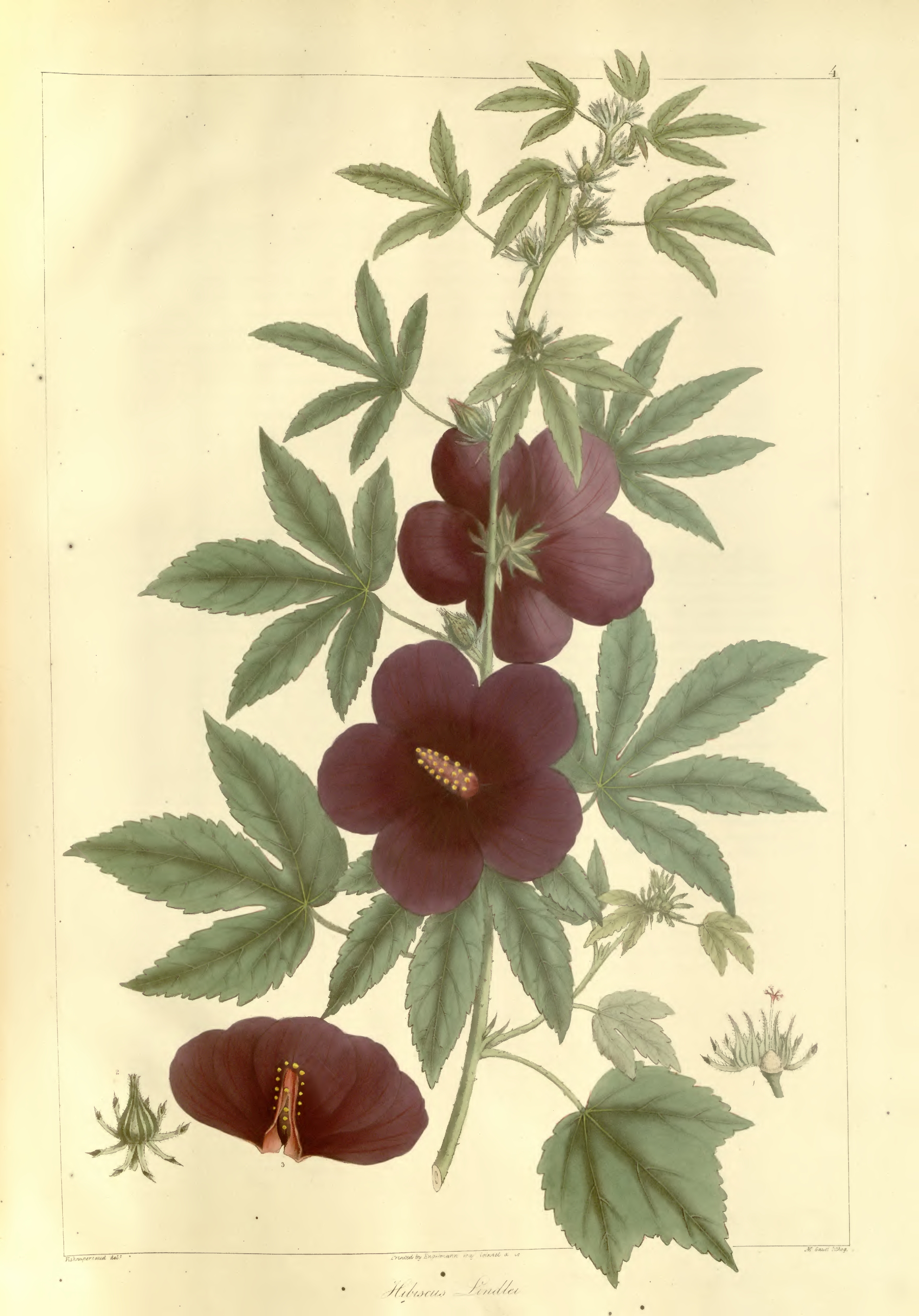
Hibiscus radiatus

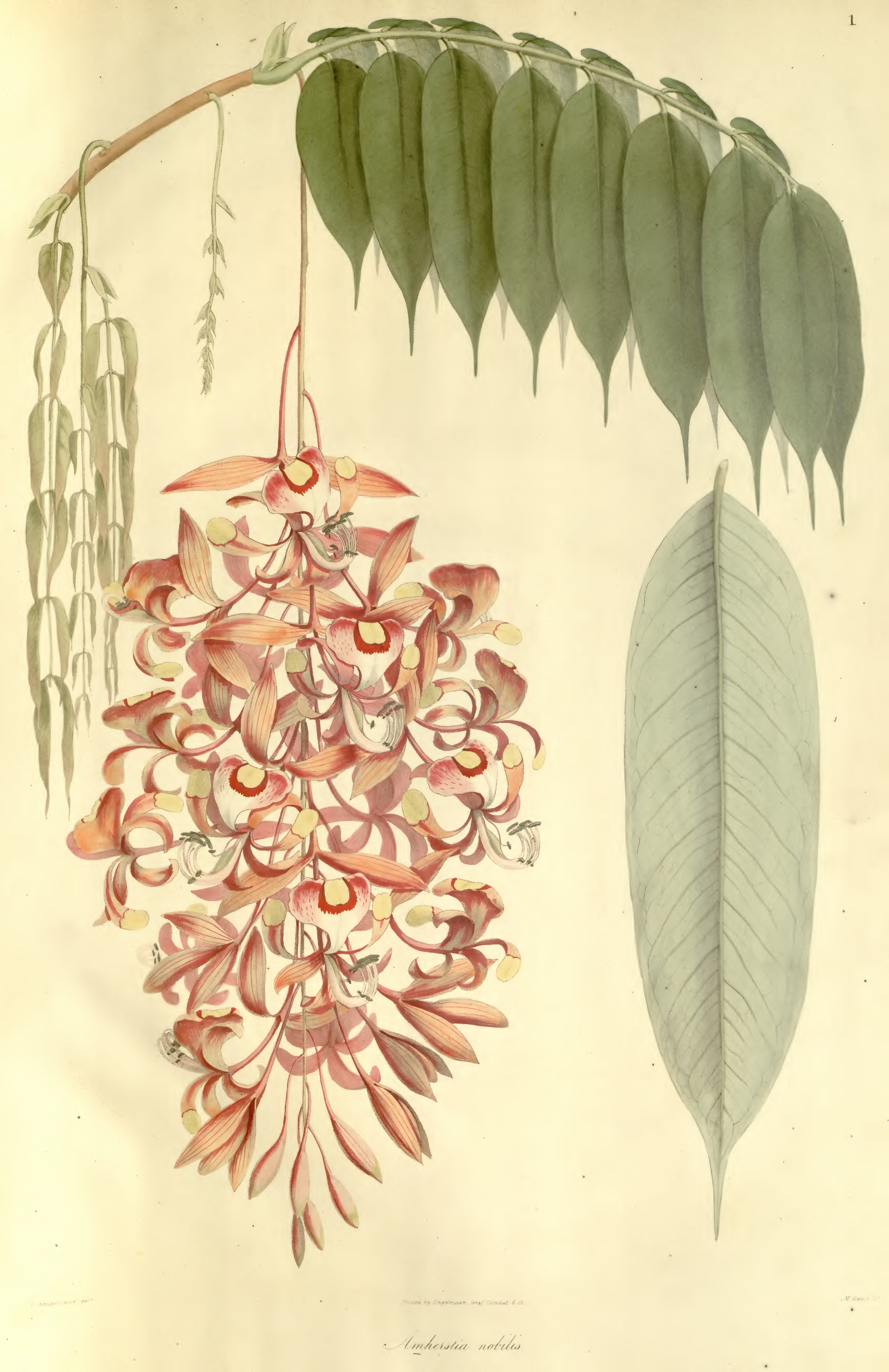
Amherstia nonilis

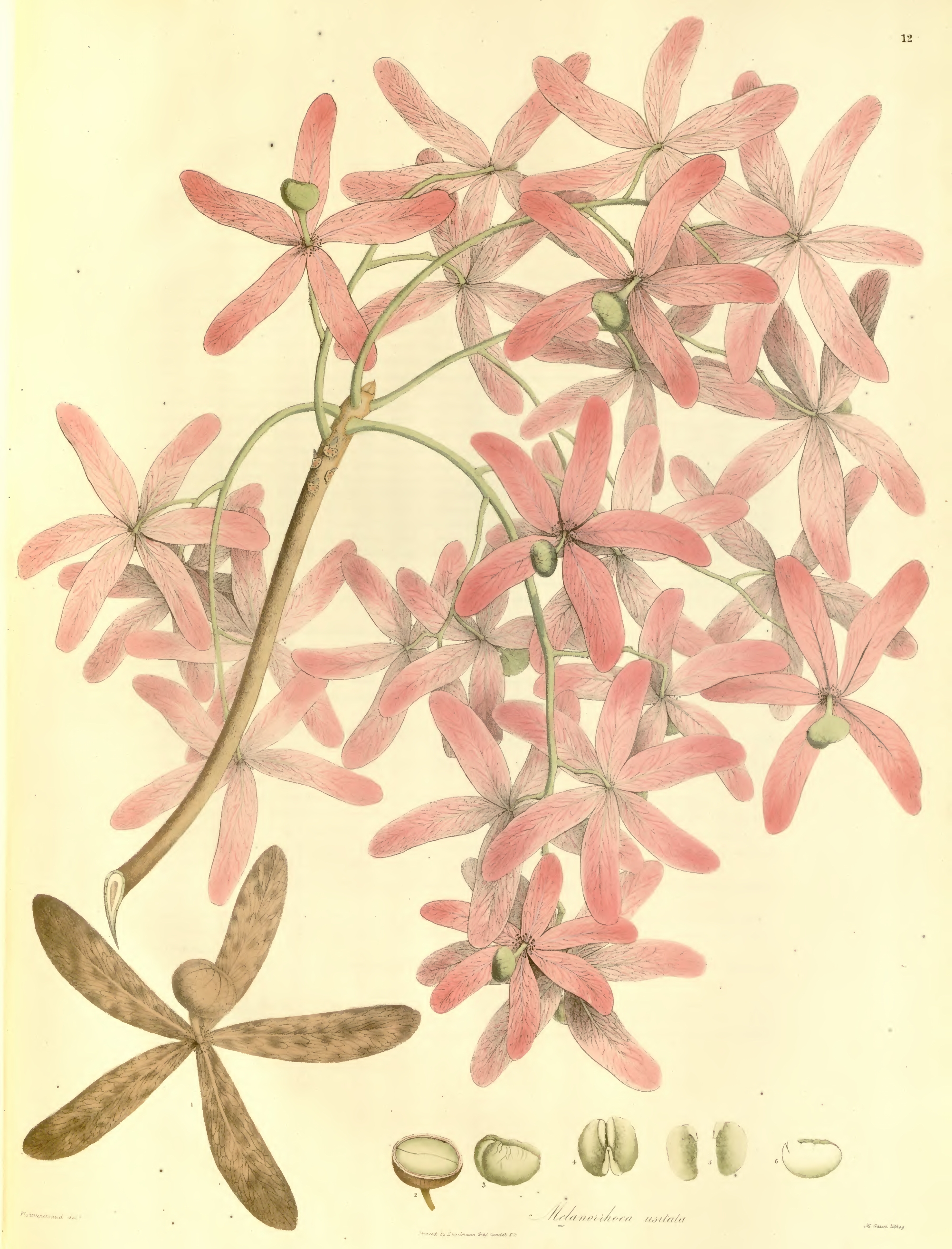
Gluta usitata

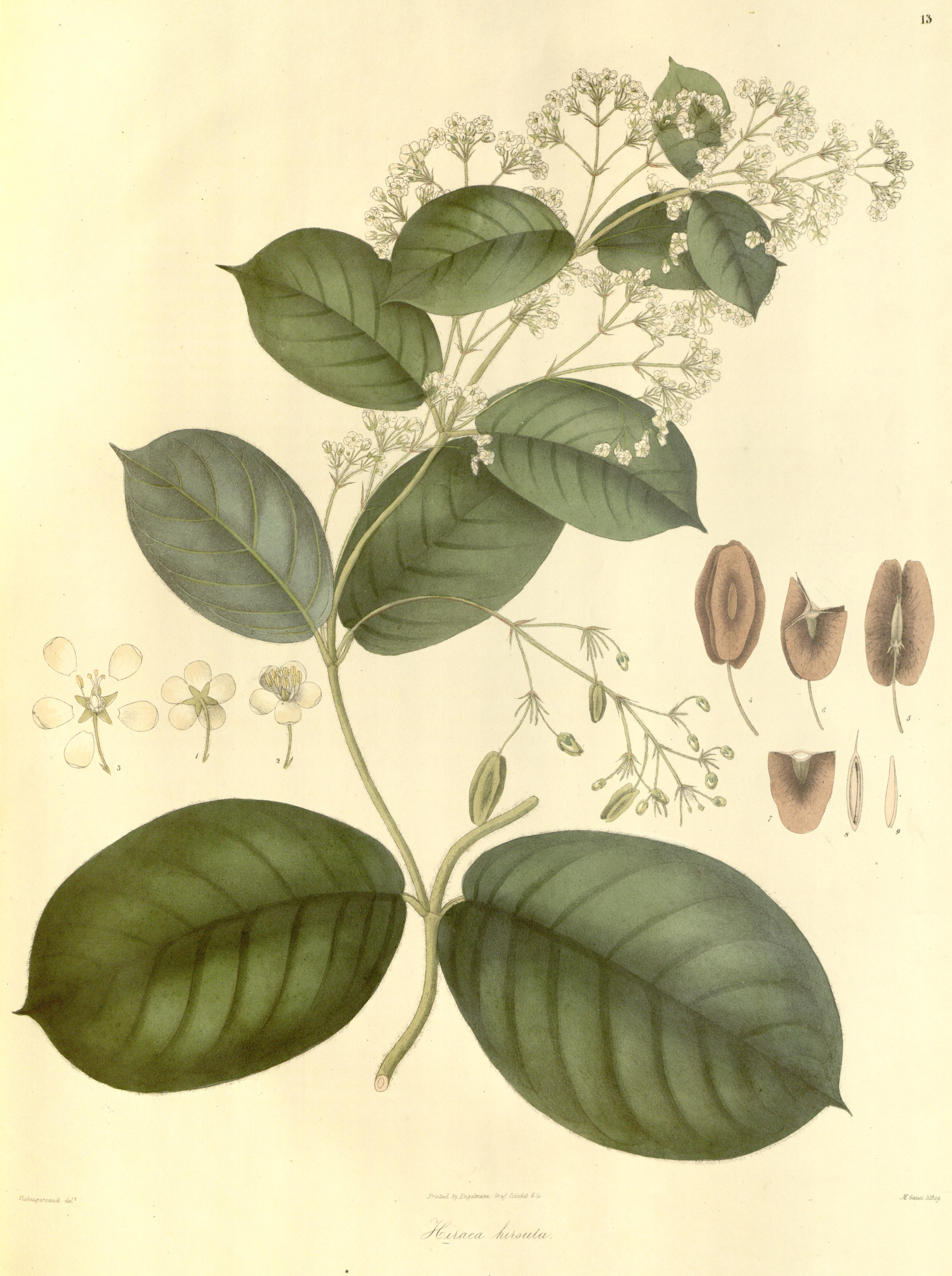
Aspidopterys hirsuta

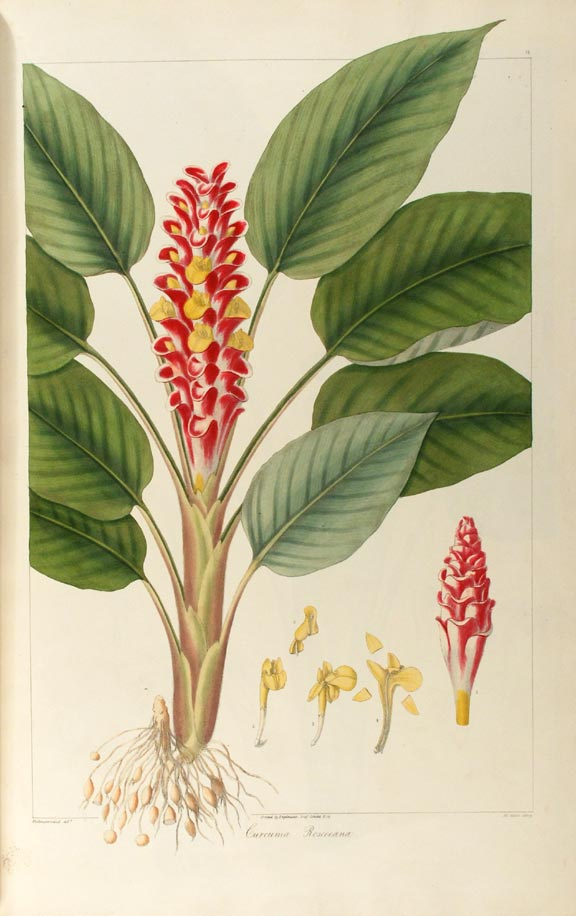
Curcuma roscoeana

== Species named after Wallich ==
- Allium wallichii (jimbur or Himalaya onion)
- Apostasia wallichii
- Brahmaea wallichii
- Bulbophyllum wallichii
- Burmannia wallichii
- Castanopsis wallichii
- Catreus wallichii (cheer pheasant or Wallich's pheasant)
- Clerodendrum wallichii
- Convolvulus wallichianus
- Debregeasia wallichiana
- Dioscorea wallichii
- Diospyros wallichii
- Dombeya wallichii
- Dryopteris wallichiana
- Eriophyton wallichii
- Euphorbia wallichii
- Geranium wallichianum
- Heptapleurum wallichianum
- Horsfieldia wallichii
- Hoya wallichii
- Ilex wallichii
- Koilodepas wallichianum
- Ligusticum wallichii (Szechuan lovage)
- Lilium wallichianum
- Meconopsis wallichii
- Memecylon wallichii
- Nageia wallichiana
- Pinus wallichiana (blue pine or Bhutan pine)
- Pteris wallichiana
- Rhododendron wallichii
- Rotala wallichii
- Rubus wallichii
- Salacca wallichiana
- Sarcococca wallichii
- Schima wallichii
- Sorbus wallichii
- Strobilanthes wallichii (Kashmir acanthus, hardy Persian shield, wild petunia or kandali)
- Taxus wallichiana (Himalayan yew)
- Ternstroemia wallichiana
- Tylecodon wallichii
- Thysia wallichii
- Ulmus wallichiana (Himalayan elm or Kashmir elm)
- Valeriana wallichii (Indian valerian or Tagar-ganthoda)
- Wallichia (a genus of palms)
- Widdringtonia wallichii (Clanwilliam cedar or Clanwilliam cypress)

== See also ==
- Plantae Asiaticae Rariores
- Zoological Survey of India

== Film ==
- Morten Skriver (director): "Nathanial Wallich & Botanikkens Imperium", Zentropa Real (2003) (in Danish)
