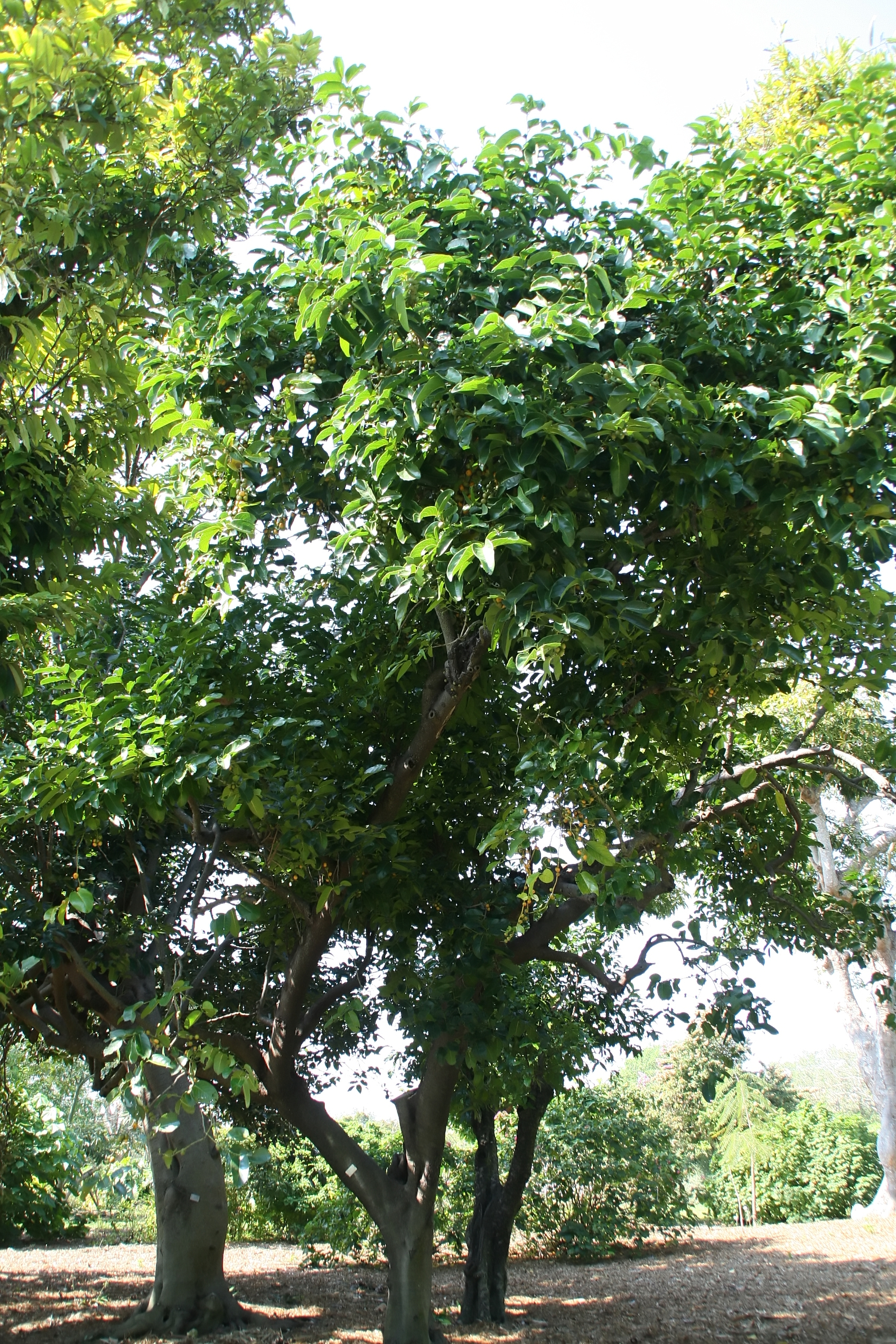
- At Fairchild Tropical Botanic Garden, Miami

Conservation status
- Least Concern (IUCN 3.1)

Scientific classification
- Kingdom: Plantae
- Clade: Tracheophytes
- Clade: Angiosperms
- Clade: Eudicots
- Clade: Asterids
- Order: Ericales
- Family: Ebenaceae
- Genus: Diospyros
- Species: D. maritima

Binomial name
- Diospyros maritima Blume

Synonyms
- Cargillia laxa R.Br.; Cargillia maritima Hassk.; Cargillia megalocarpa F.Muell.; Diospyros camarinensis Merr.; Diospyros kusanoi Hayata; Diospyros liukiuensis Makino; Diospyros nitens W.Fitzg.; Maba megalocarpa F.Muell.

= Diospyros maritima =

Species of tree

Diospyros maritima (commonly known as the Malaysian persimmon, broadleaf ebony and sea ebony) is a tree in the family Ebenaceae. The specific epithet maritima means 'by the sea', referring to the tree's habitat.

== Description ==
Diospyros maritima grows up to 15 metres (50 ft) tall. The inflorescences bear up to 10 flowers. The fruits are round, up to 1.7 cm (1 in) in diameter.

== Distribution and habitat ==
Diospyros maritima is native to an area from Japan and Taiwan to Malesia and northern Australia. Its habitat is coastal forests.
