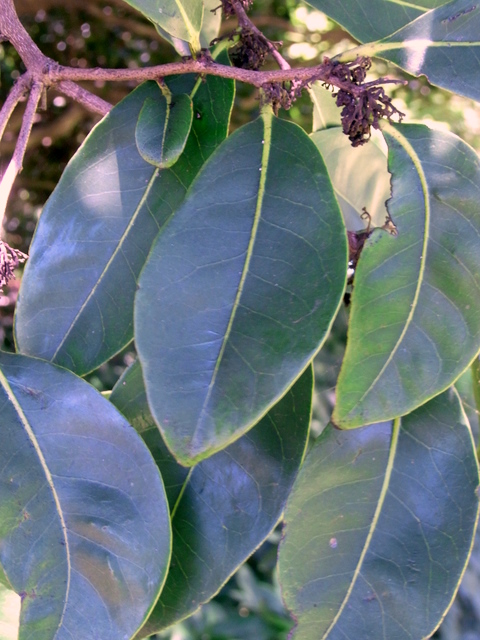

Conservation status
- Least Concern (IUCN 3.1)

Scientific classification
- Kingdom: Plantae
- Clade: Tracheophytes
- Clade: Angiosperms
- Clade: Eudicots
- Clade: Asterids
- Order: Ericales
- Family: Ebenaceae
- Genus: Diospyros
- Species: D. fasciculosa

Binomial name
- Diospyros fasciculosa (F.Muell.) F.Muell.

Synonyms
- Maba fasciculosa F.Muell.

= Diospyros fasciculosa =

Species of tree

Diospyros fasciculosa, is a rainforest tree in the ebony family. Australian common names include grey ebony, clustered persimmon, ebony and Long Tom.

The specific epithet fasciculus refers to a “little bundle”, as the flowers and fruits are in clusters.

== Distribution ==
The tree is native to Australia, Fiji, and Southeast Asia. In Australia it is found from the Clarence River, New South Wales to Bamaga on the Cape York Peninsula.

== Description ==
Diospyros fasciculosa is usually seen as a medium-sized tree, but it may grow up to 30 metres (98 ft) tall.

The clustered fruits are a type of persimmon.
