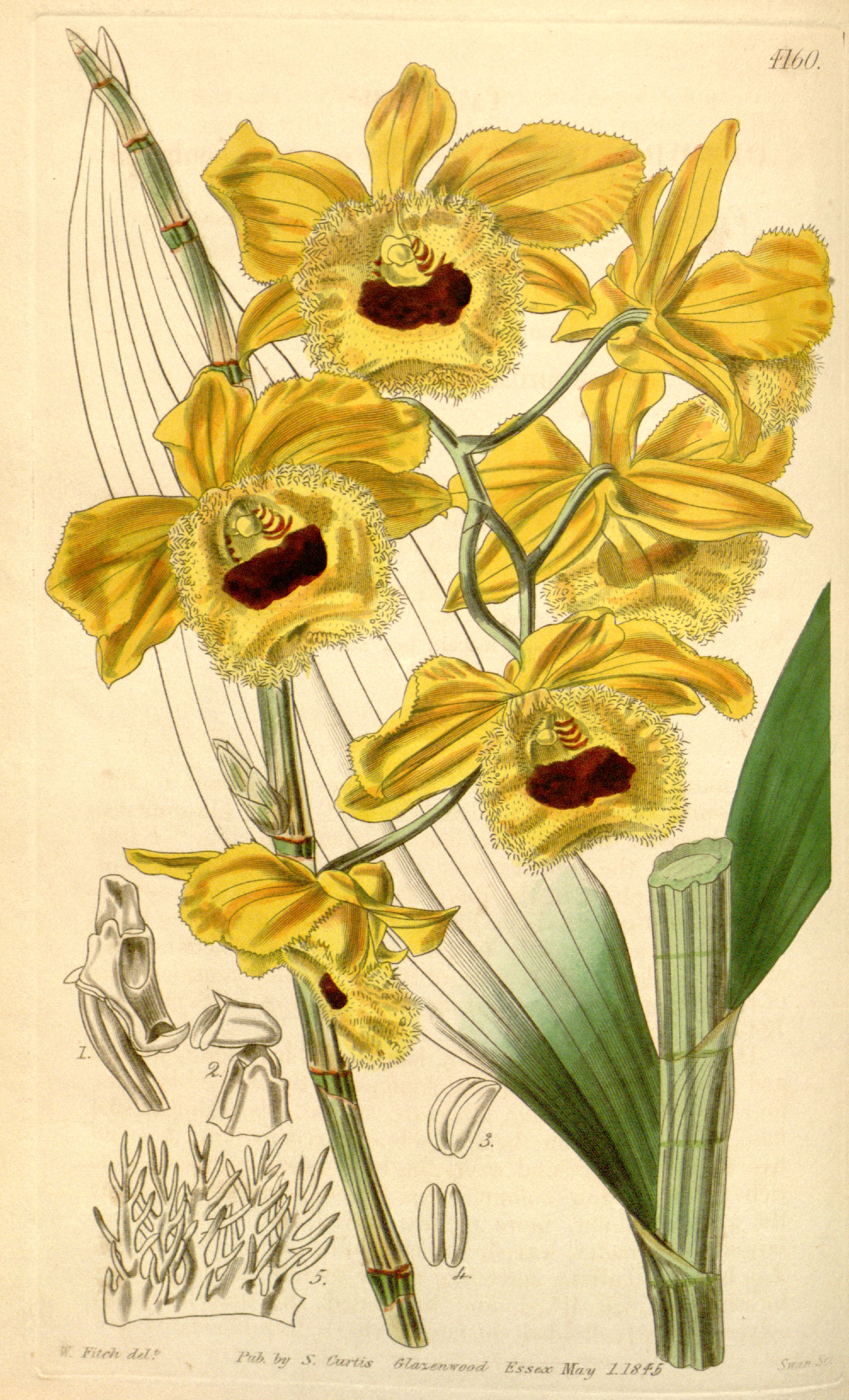
- Illustration from Curtis's Botanical Magazine

Scientific classification
- Kingdom: Plantae
- Clade: Tracheophytes
- Clade: Angiosperms
- Clade: Monocots
- Order: Asparagales
- Family: Orchidaceae
- Subfamily: Epidendroideae
- Genus: Dendrobium
- Species: D. fimbriatum

Binomial name
- Dendrobium fimbriatum Hook. (1823)

Synonyms
- Callista fimbriata (Hook.) Kuntze (1891); Dendrobium paxtonii Paxton (1839), illegitimate; Dendrobium normale Falc. (1839); Dendrobium fimbriatum var. oculatum Hook. (1845); Callista normalis (Falc.) Kuntze (1891); Callista oculata (Hook.) Kuntze (1891)

= Dendrobium fimbriatum =

Species of orchid

Dendrobium fimbriatum is a species of orchid. It is native to China (Guangxi, Guizhou, Yunnan), the Himalayas (northern and eastern India, Nepal, Bhutan, Bangladesh, Assam, Arunachal Pradesh) and Indochina (Myanmar, Thailand, Laos, Vietnam, Peninsular Malaysia). It grows on tree trunks in dense forests or on damp rocks in mountain valleys. It is known in Chinese as 流苏石斛 (liu su shi hu).

== Images ==
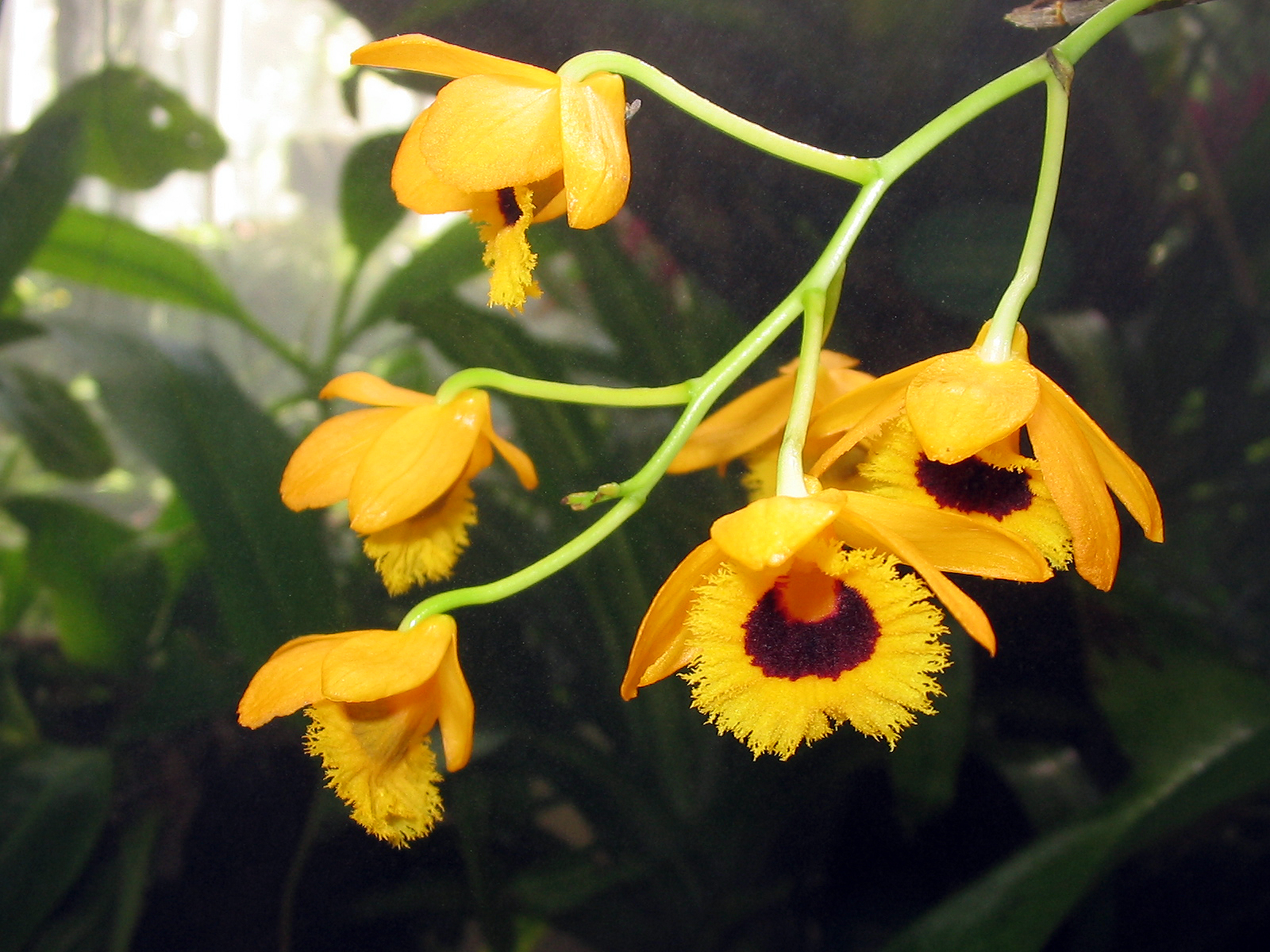

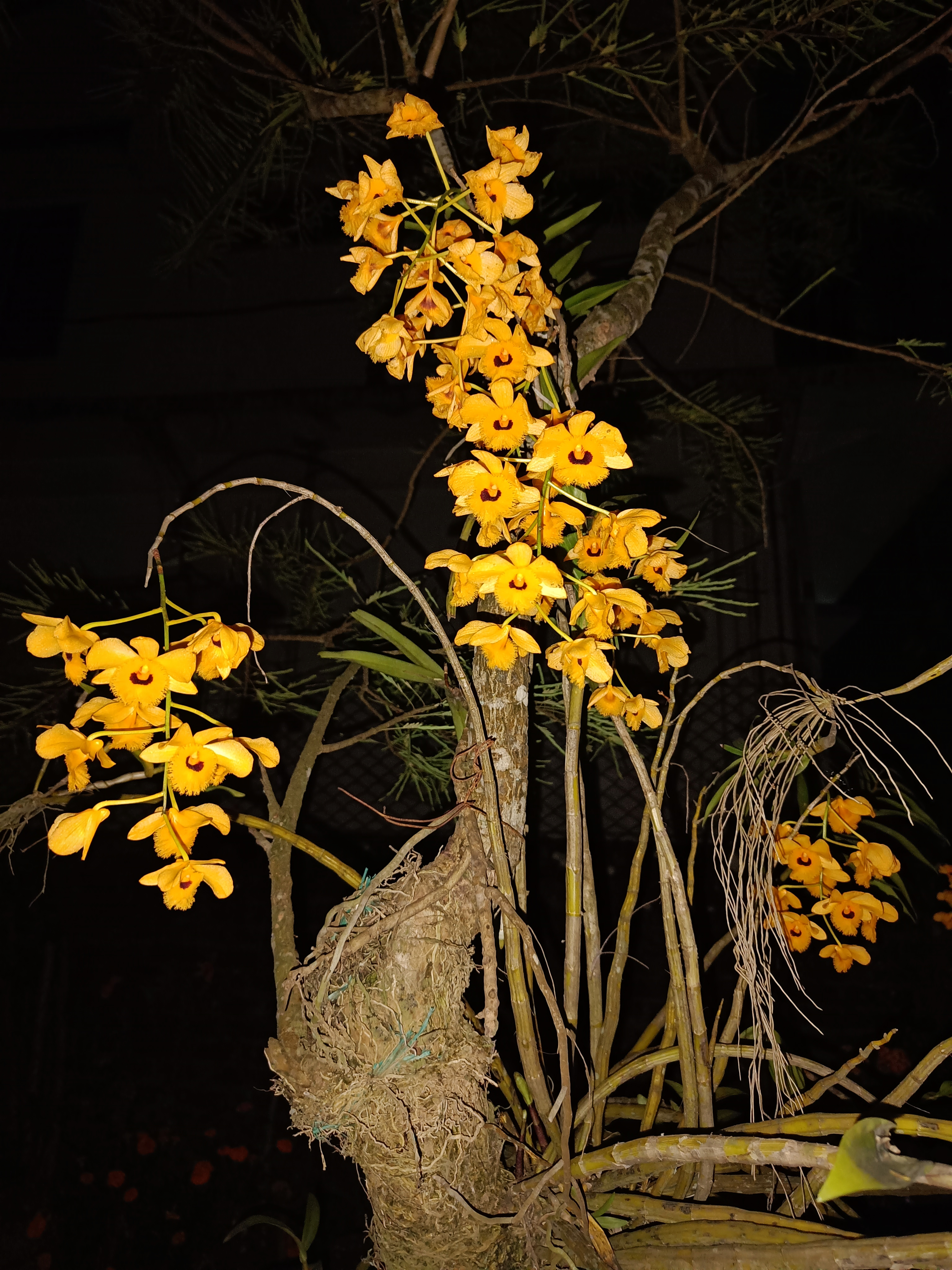
