= Plantae Asiaticae Rariores =

Botanical book on Indian plants by Nathaniel Wallich

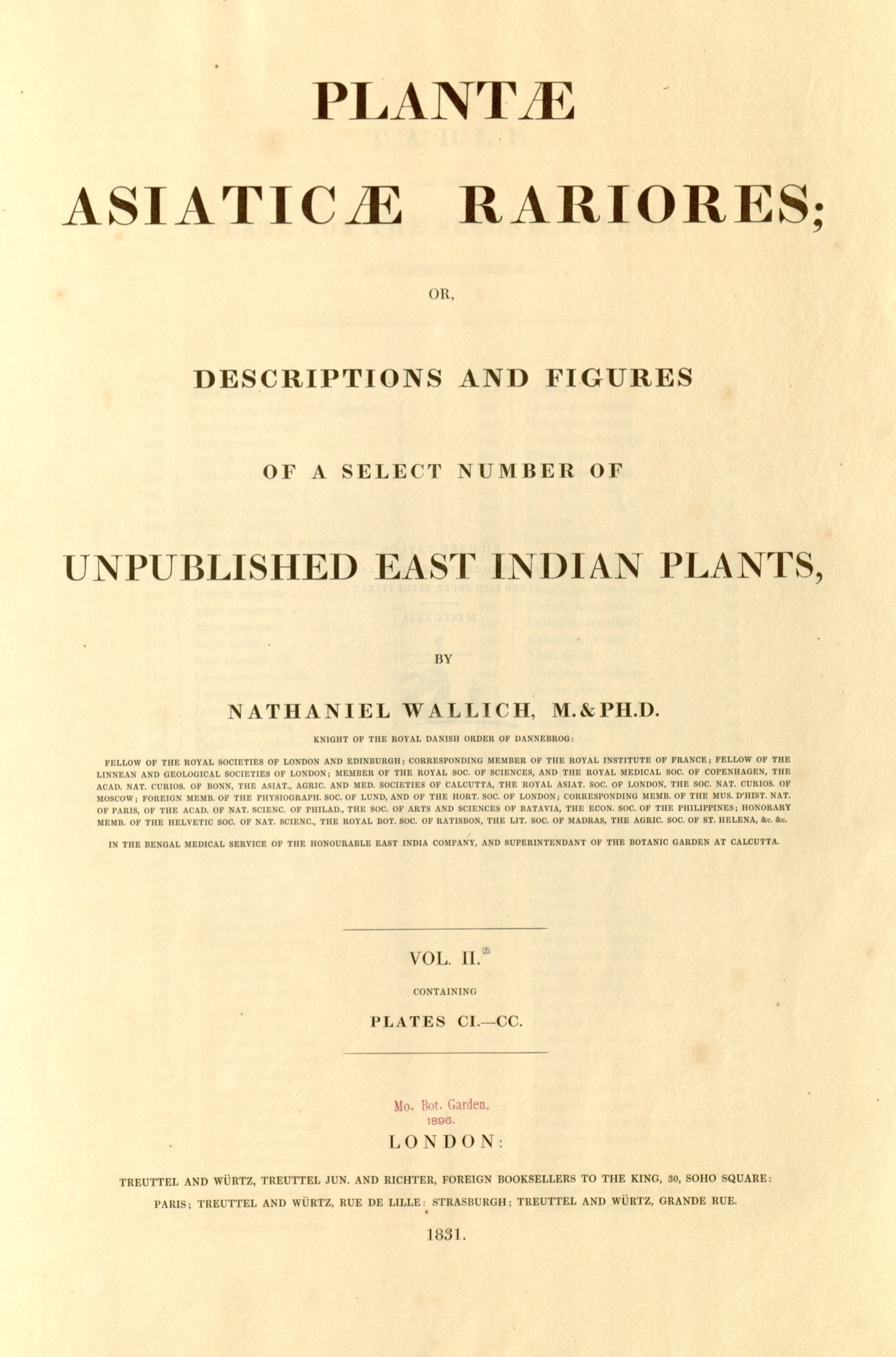
- The title page of the 1830 edition of Plantae Asiaticae Rariores
- Author: Nathaniel Wallich
- Language: English
- Subject: Botany
- Genre: Science; Biology
- Publisher: Richard Taylor for Treuttel and Würtz
- Publication date: 1830–1832
- Publication place: United Kingdom
- Media type: Print (Hardback)

Plantae Asiaticae Rariores is a horticultural work (alternative title Descriptions and figures of a select number of unpublished East Indian plants) published in 1830–1832 by the Danish botanist Nathaniel Wallich.

Plantae Asiaticae Rariores was published in London, Paris and Strassburg between 1829 and 1832 and consisted of 3 volumes bound from the 12 original parts in folio size (21½ × 14½ inches) with 294 hand-coloured plates lithographed by Maxim Gauci. Wallich went on extended leave in 1828 to supervise the printing and hand-colouring of the illustrations in England. Foremost of the watercolour artists who executed the original paintings were two Indian artists, Vishnupersaud, responsible for 114 plates and Gorachand for 87. Vishnupersaud (occasionally referred to as Vishnu Prasad) was an Indian artist frequently employed by naturalists working in India, such as John Forbes Royle and Francis Buchanan-Hamilton. Vishnupersaud's skill was legendary and Wilfrid Blunt included one of his watercolours in his book The Art of Botanical Illustration as displaying great craftsmanship. The remaining plates were done by Charles M. Curtis (7), William Griffith (3), Sarah Drake, and various others. A double-page engraved map of India created by John Arrowsmith, showed the routes followed by various botanists. A noteworthy point is that plate number 6 is an engraving by H. Weddell, and not a lithograph.

Plantae Asiaticae was seen to follow naturally on William Roxburgh's Plants of the coast of Coromandel (London: 1795–1820) and was sponsored by the East India Company who subscribed to 40 copies. The 12 parts were sold at £2 10s each, between September 1829 and August 1832.

Wallich writes in the introduction, "The present Work consists of a selection of plants made chiefly from a series of 1200 drawings, executed under my direction by Native Artists." He goes on to praise the work of the lithographer Maxim Gauci and the colourist John Clark: "For both of these worthy men and admirable artists I beg to express my sincere respect."

== Gallery of plates ==
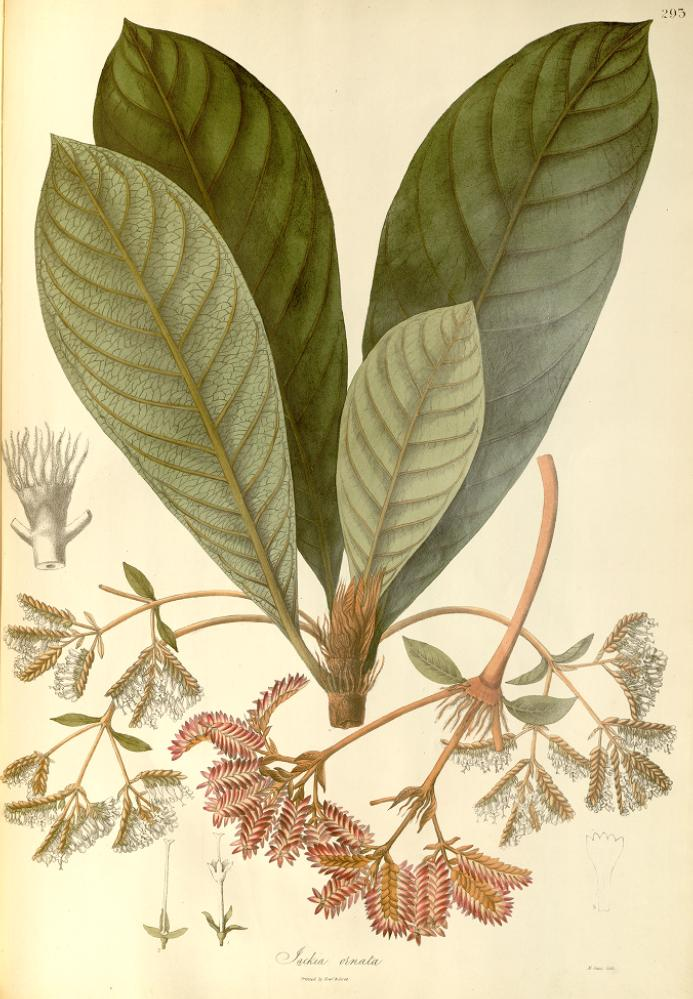
Jackiopsis ornata

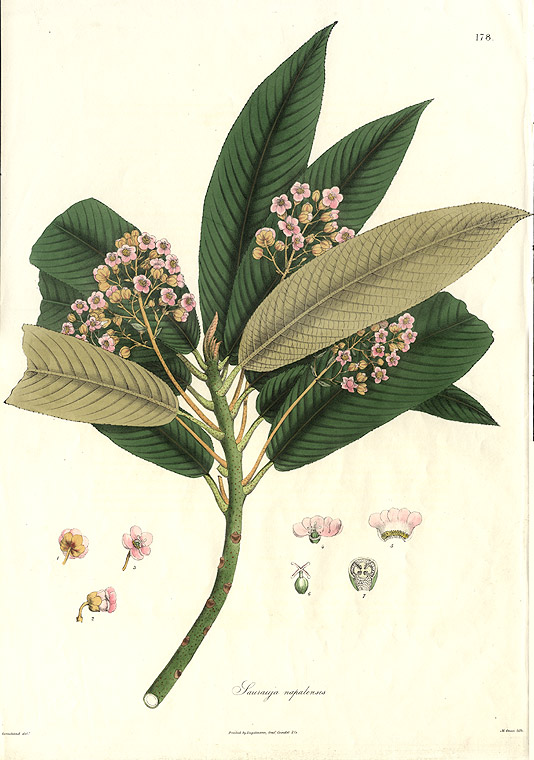
Saurauia nepalensis

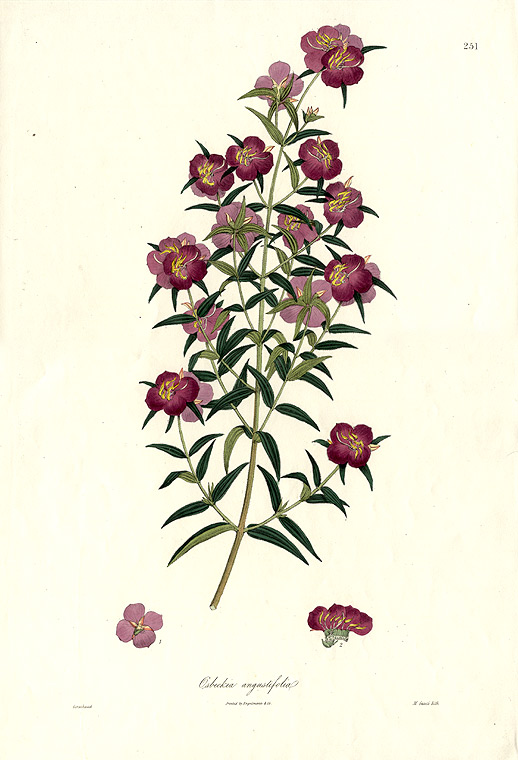
Osbeckia angustifolia

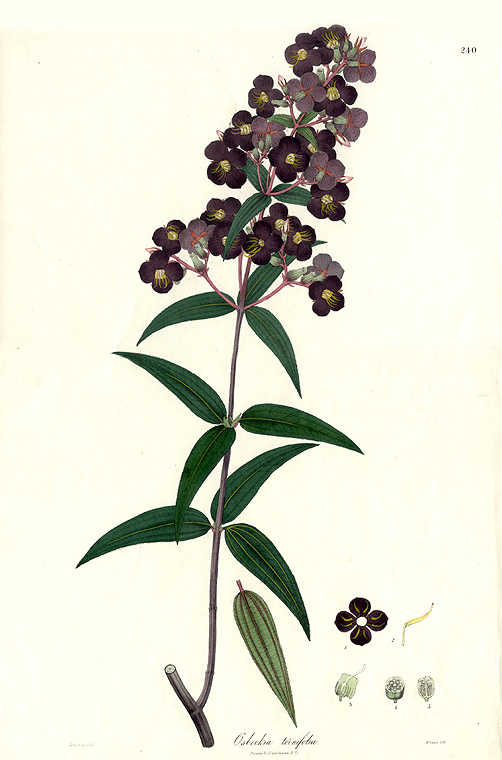
Osbeckia ternifolia

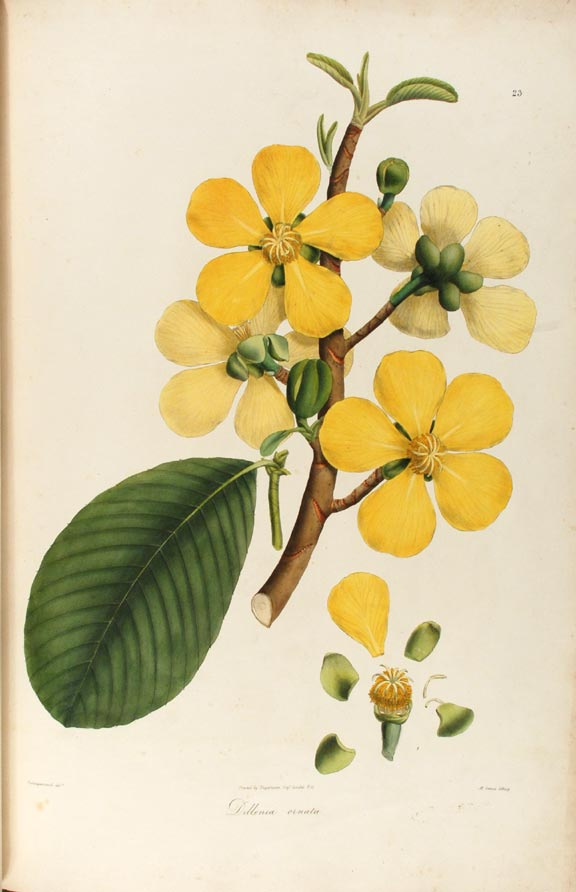
Dillenia aurea

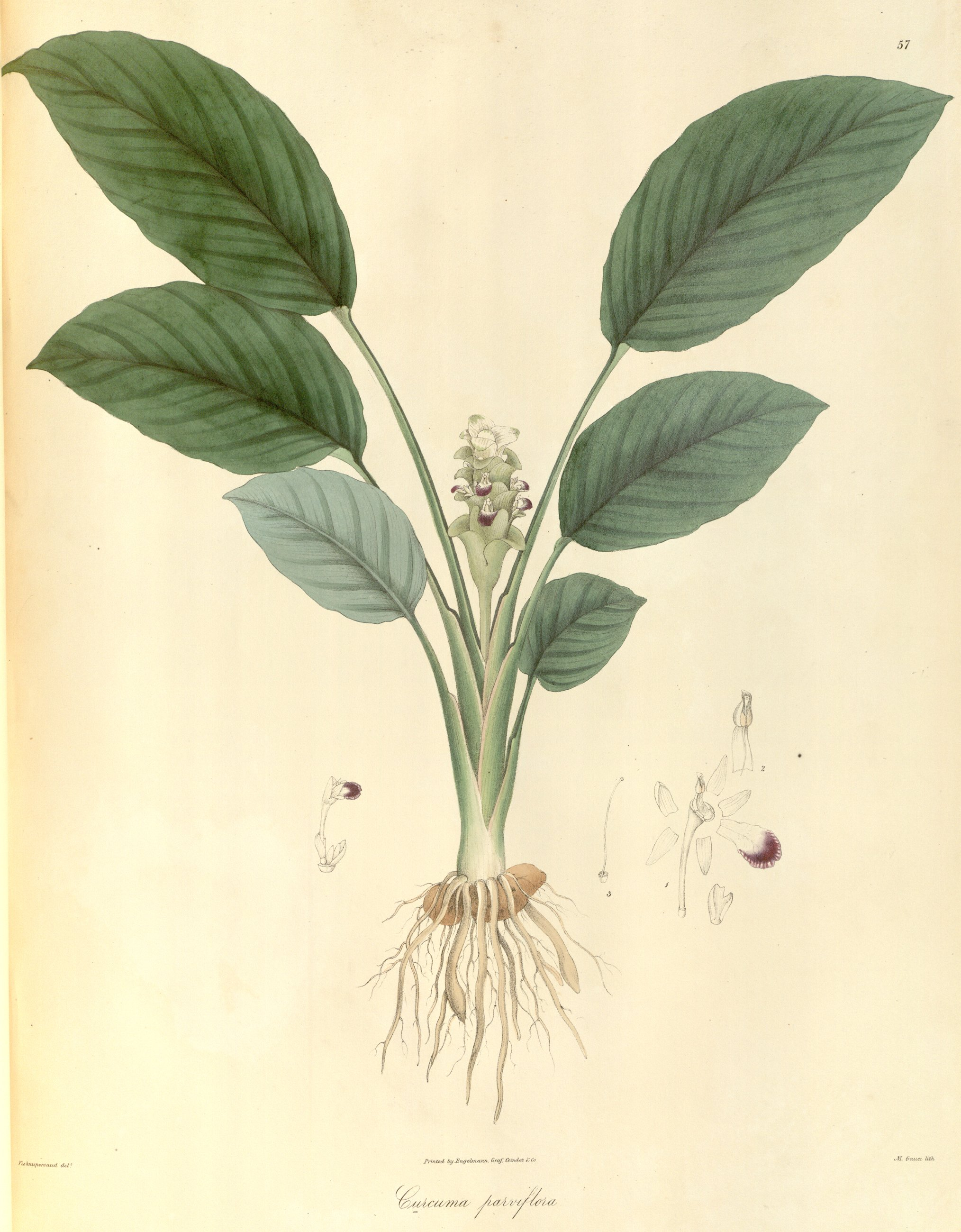
Curcuma parviflora

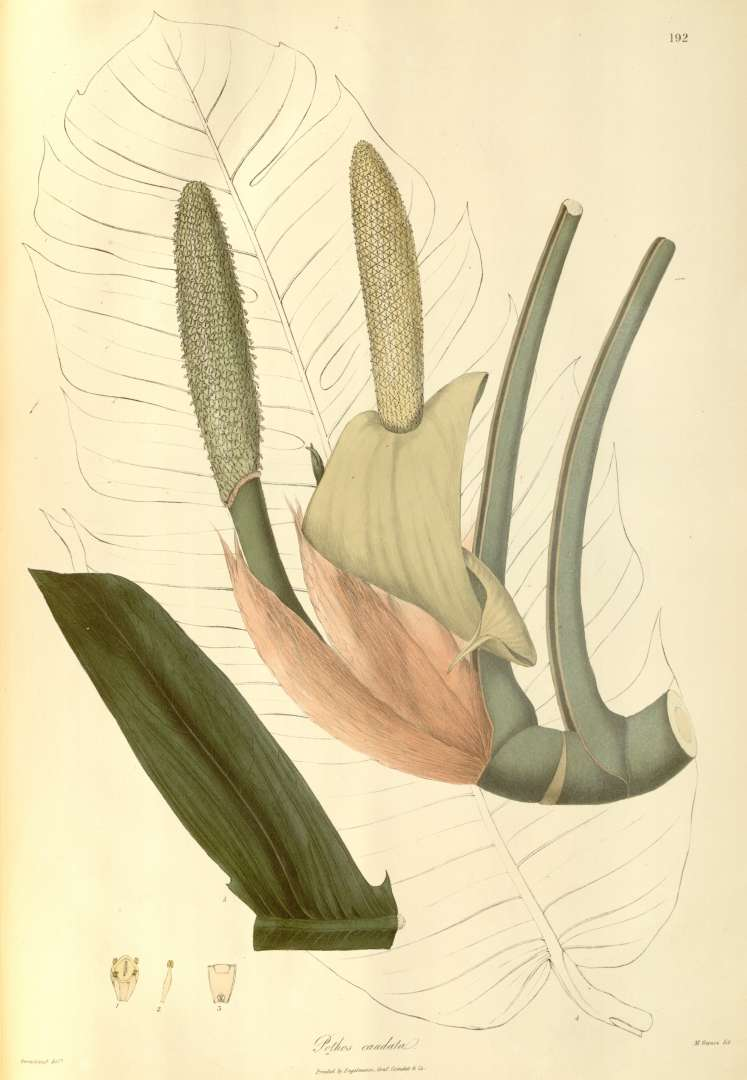
Epipremnum pinnatum

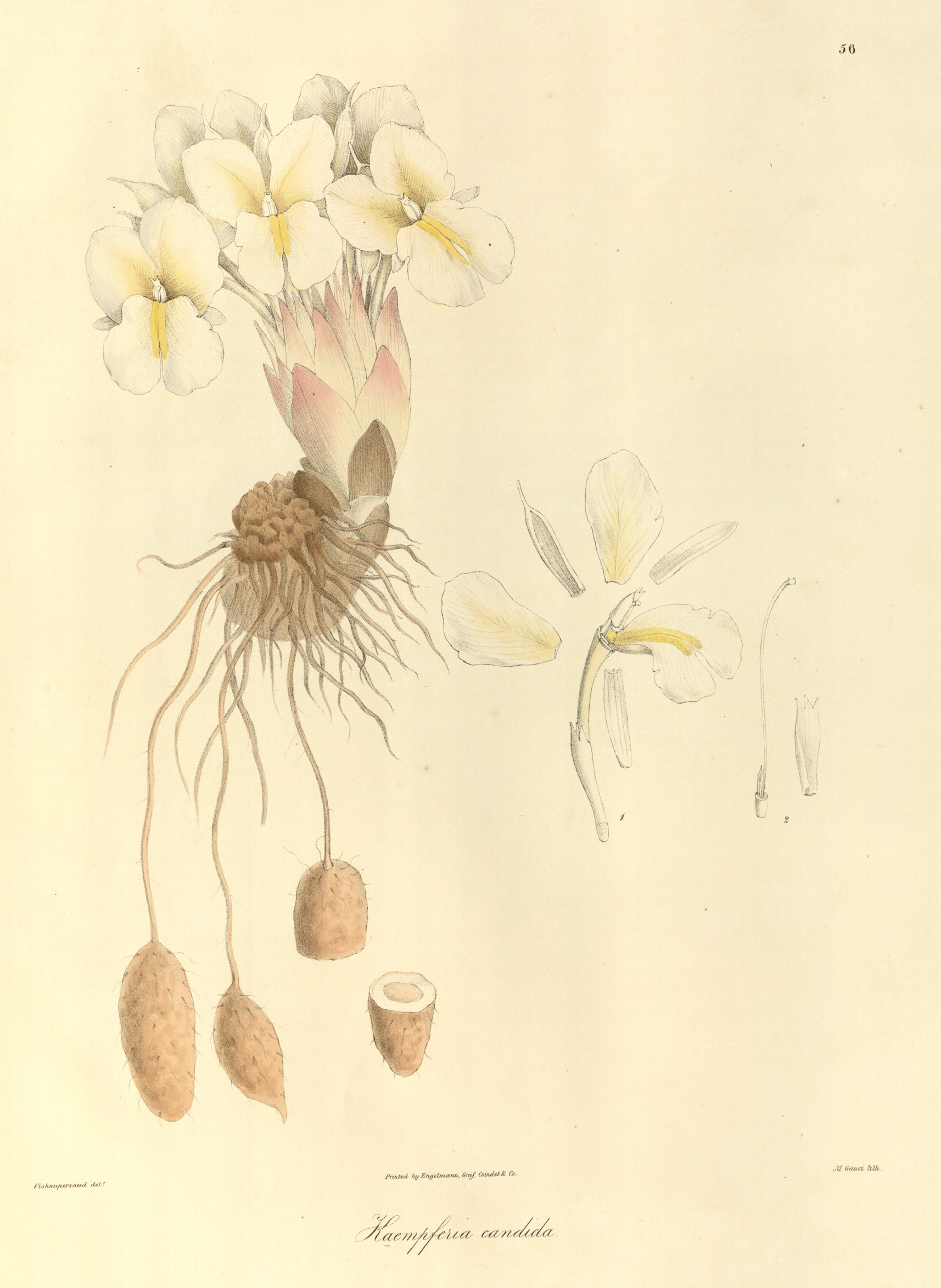
Kaempferia candida

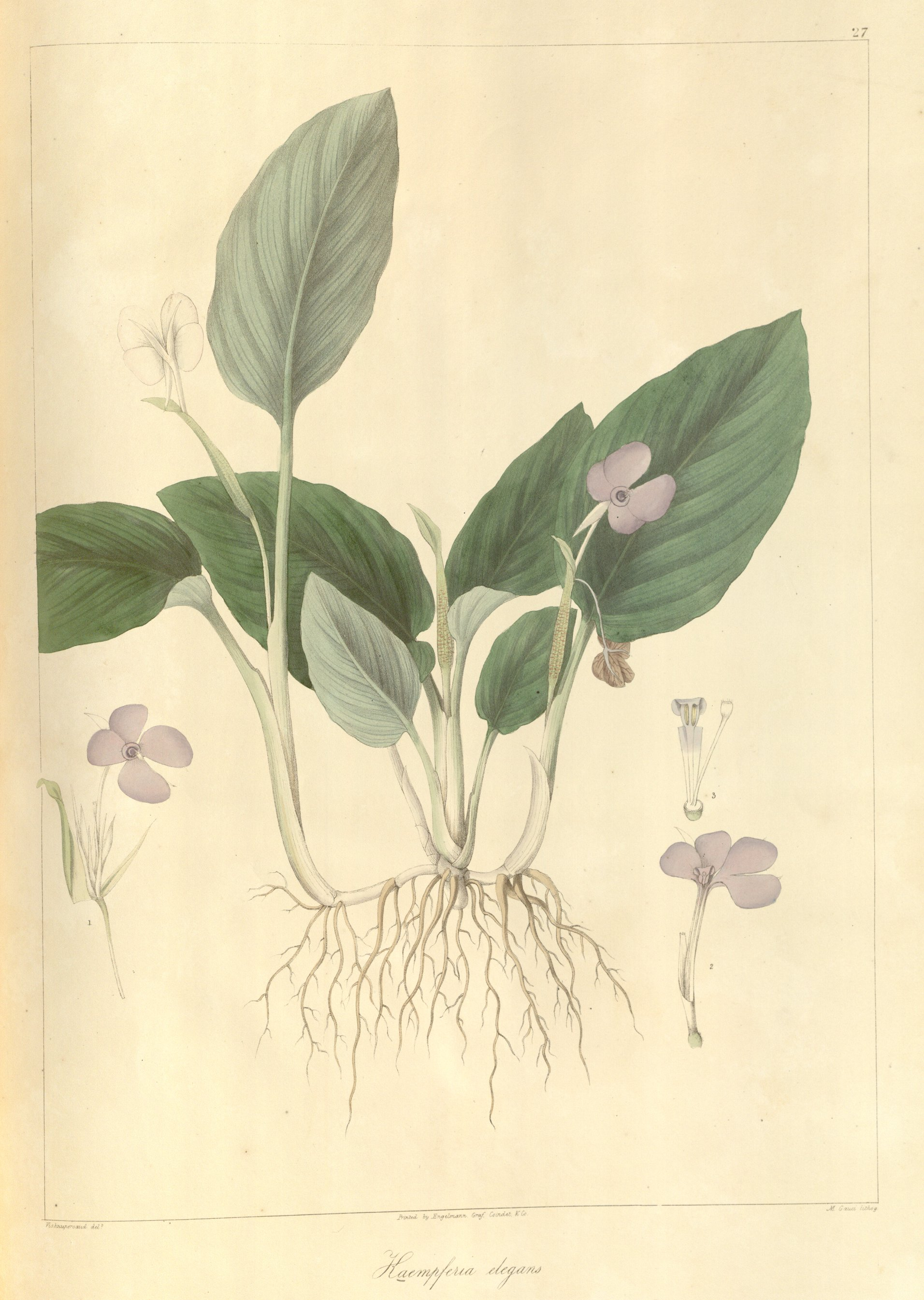
Kaempferia elegans

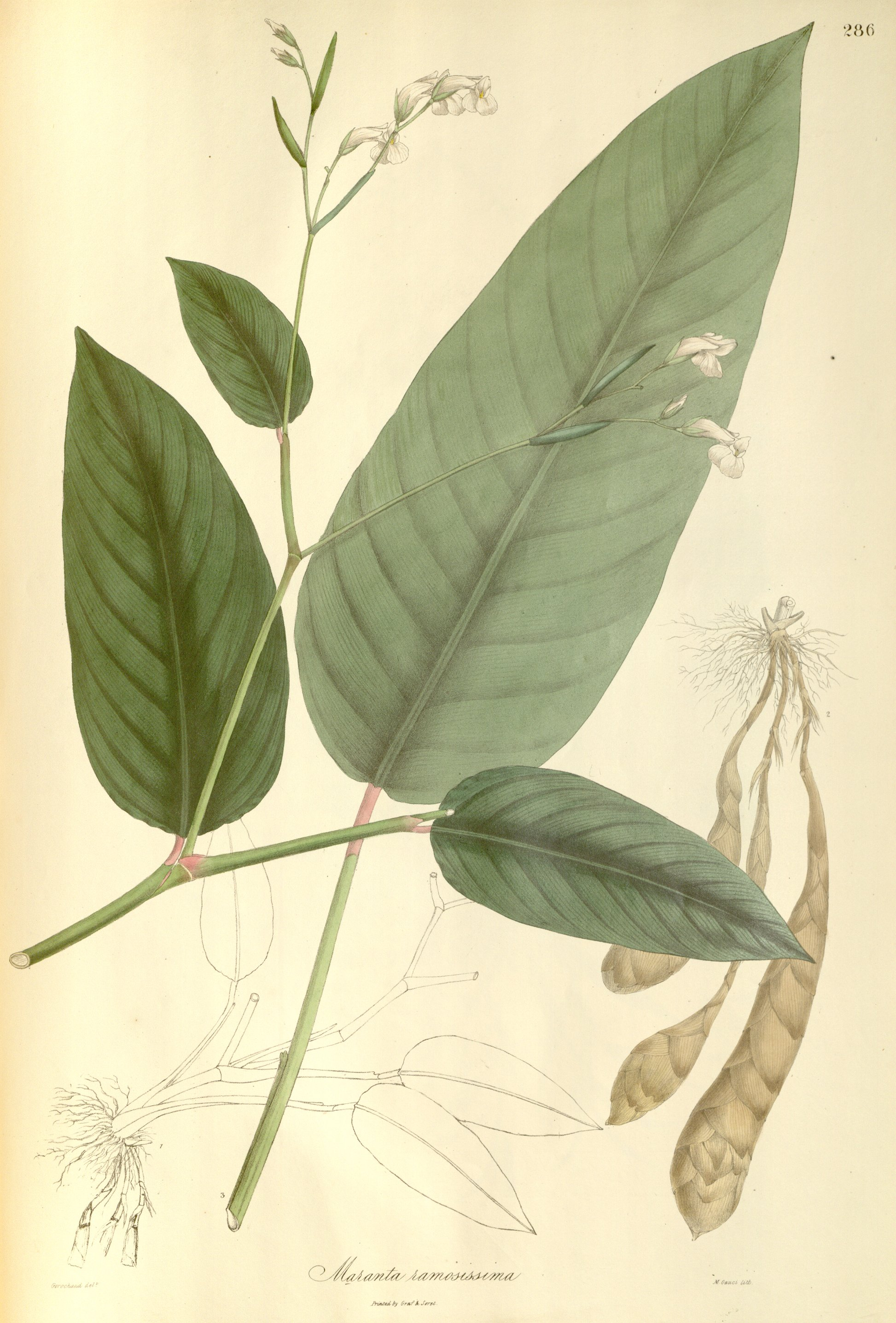
Maranta ramosissima

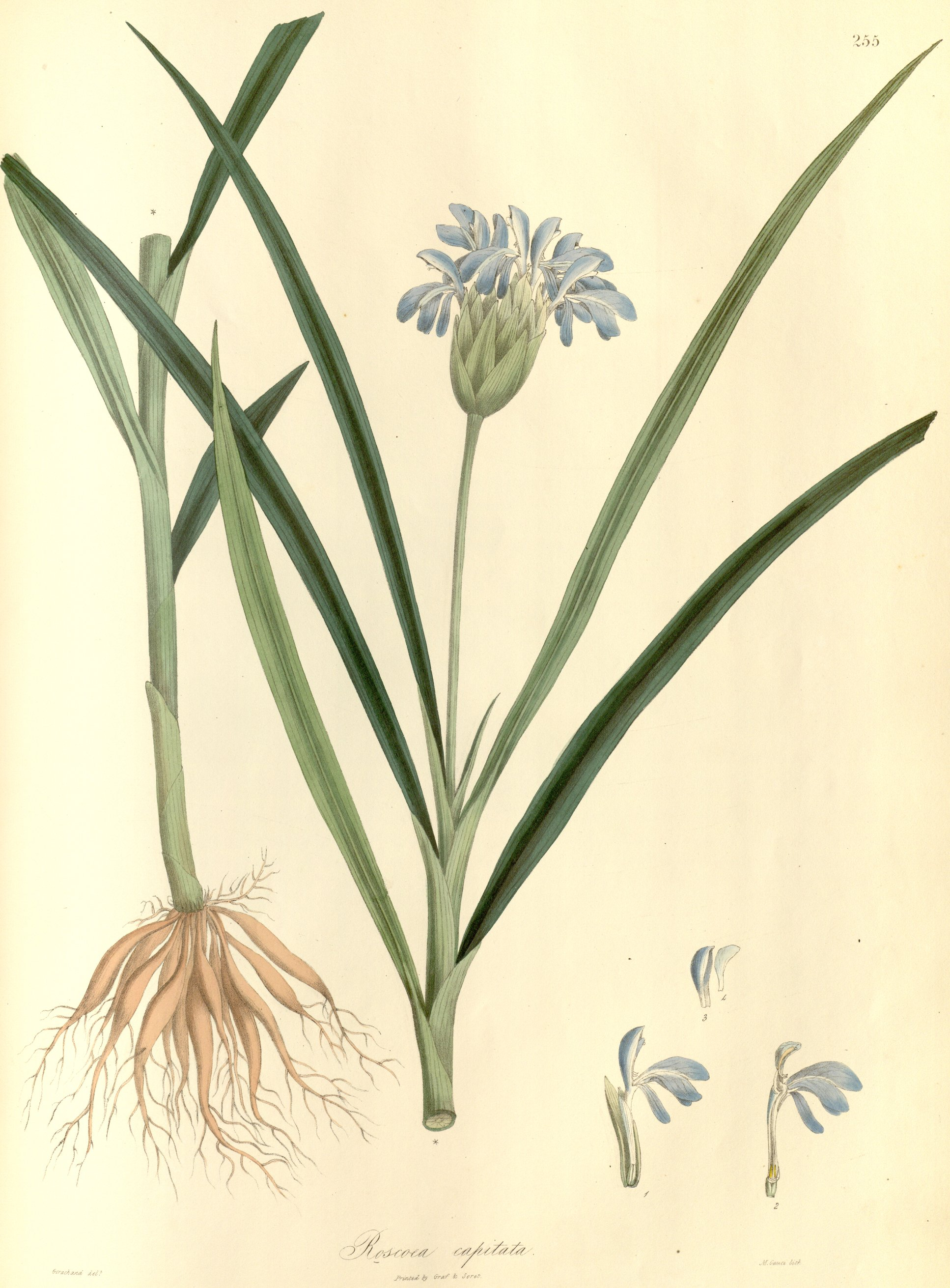
Roscoea_capitata

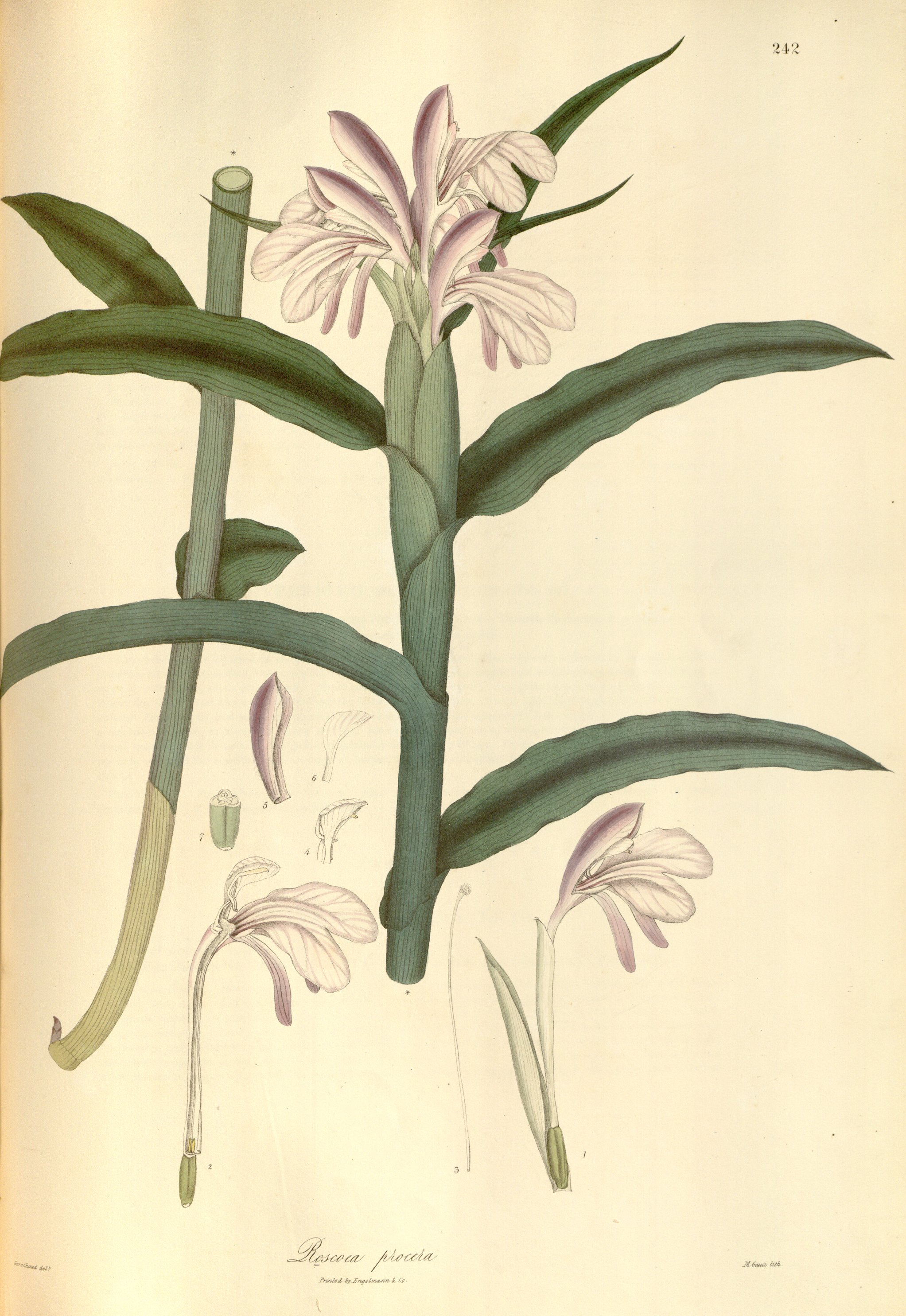
Roscoea purpurata purpurata

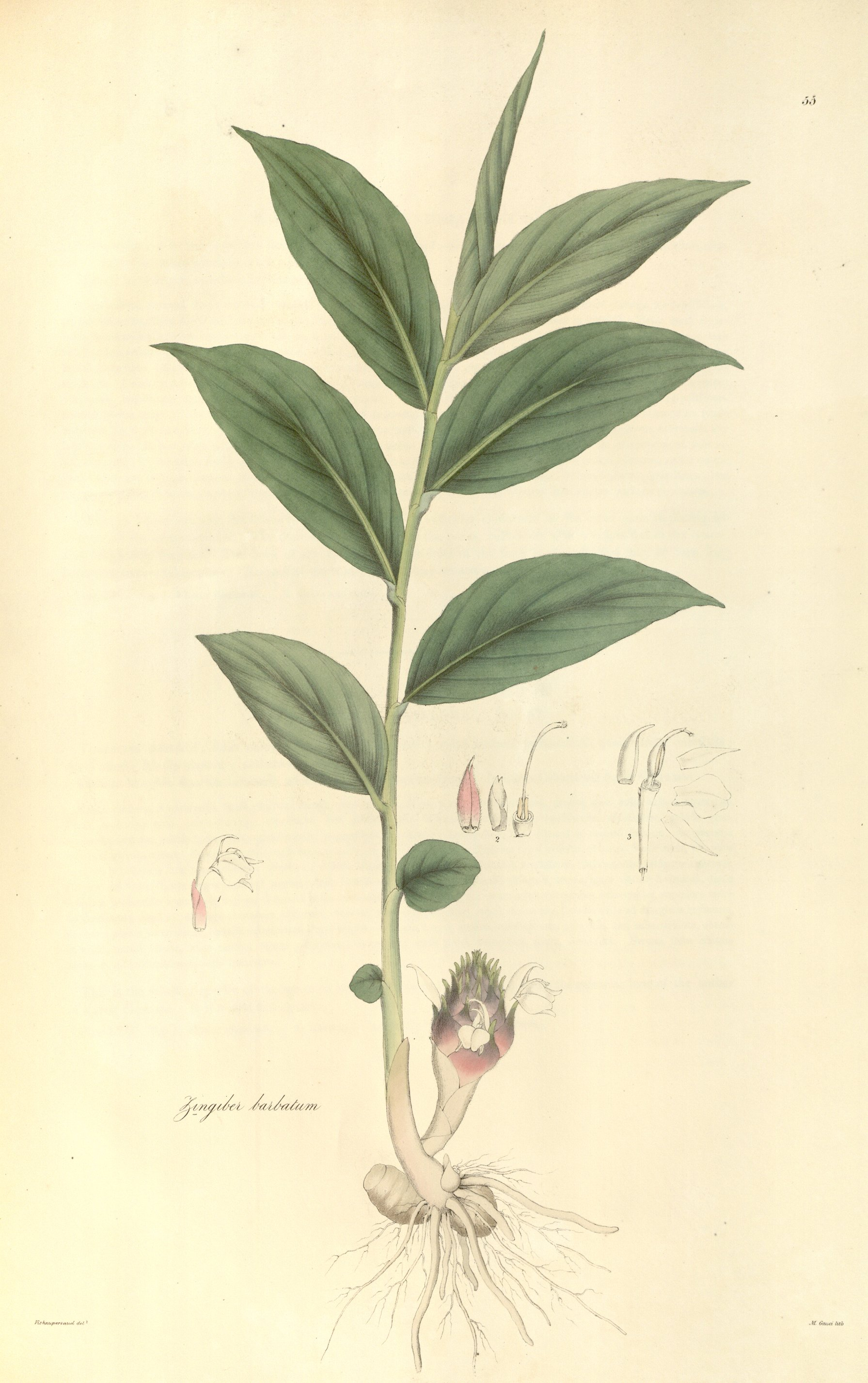
Zingiber barbatum
