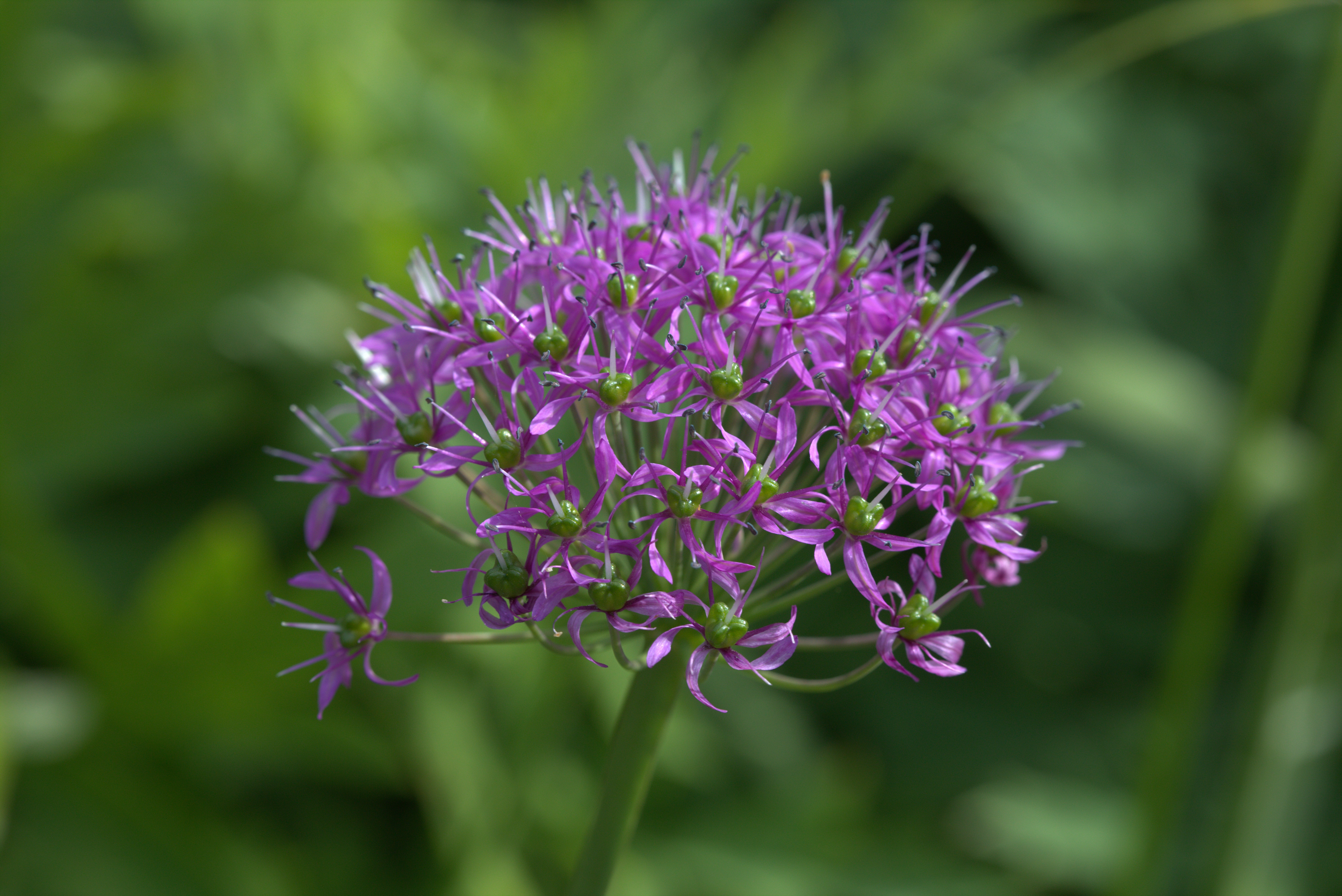

Scientific classification
- Kingdom: Plantae
- Clade: Tracheophytes
- Clade: Angiosperms
- Clade: Monocots
- Order: Asparagales
- Family: Amaryllidaceae
- Subfamily: Allioideae
- Genus: Allium
- Subgenus: A. subg. Amerallium
- Species: A. wallichii

Binomial name
- Allium wallichii Kunth

Synonyms
- Allium bulleyanum Diels; Allium bulleyanum var. tchongchanense (H.Lév.) Airy Shaw; Allium caeruleum Wall.; Allium feddei H.Lév.; Allium liangshanense Z.Y.Zhu; Allium polyastrum Diels; Allium praelatitium H.Lév.; Allium tchongchanense H.Lév.; Allium violaceum Wall. ex Regel; Allium wallichianum Steud.; Allium wallichii var. albidum F.T. Wang & T. Tang; Nothoscordum mairei H.Lév.

= Allium wallichii =

Species of flowering plant

Allium wallichii is a plant species native to India, Nepal, Sikkim, Bhutan, Myanmar, and parts of China (Guangxi, Guizhou, Hunan, Sichuan, Tibet, Xizang, Yunnan). It grows at elevations of 2300–4800 m.

Allium wallichii has elongate roots and clusters of narrow bulbs. Scapes are up to 110 cm tall, triangular in cross-section. Leaves are flat, up to 20 mm across, usually shorter than the scape. Flowers are white, pink, red, dark purple (sometimes almost black).

== Varieties ==
Two varieties of the species are generally accepted:

Allium wallichii var. wallichii --- Leaves not narrowed into a petiole at the base

Allium wallichii var. platyphyllum (Diels) J.M.Xu --- Leaves are narrowed into a petiole at the base --- found only in Yunnan
