= Bulbophyllum wallichii =

Scientific classification
- Kingdom: Plantae
- Clade: Tracheophytes
- Clade: Angiosperms
- Clade: Monocots
- Order: Asparagales
- Family: Orchidaceae
- Subfamily: Epidendroideae
- Genus: Bulbophyllum
- Section: Bulbophyllum sect. Tripudianthes
- Species: B. wallichii

Binomial name
- Bulbophyllum wallichii Rchb. fil.

Synonyms
- Cirrhopetalum wallichii Lindl. 1839; Tripudianthes wallichii (Rchb.f.) Szlach. & Kras 2007; Bulbophyllum refractoides Seidenf. 1970

Species of orchid

Bulbophyllum wallichii is a species of orchid in the genus Bulbophyllum.
