= Diospyros wallichii =

Conservation status
- Least Concern (IUCN 3.1)

Scientific classification
- Kingdom: Plantae
- Clade: Tracheophytes
- Clade: Angiosperms
- Clade: Eudicots
- Clade: Asterids
- Order: Ericales
- Family: Ebenaceae
- Genus: Diospyros
- Species: D. wallichii

Binomial name
- Diospyros wallichii King & Gamble

Synonyms
- Diospyros bakhuisii Boerl. & Koord.-Schum.; Diospyros pulchrinervia Kosterm.

Species of flowering plant

Diospyros wallichii is a tree in the family Ebenaceae. It is named for the Danish botanist Nathaniel Wallich.

== Description ==
Diospyros wallichii grows up to 20 metres (70 ft) tall. The twigs are rusty-hairy when young. The Inflorescences bear up to nine flowers. The fruits are round, up to 2.5 cm (1 in) in diameter.

== Distribution and habitat ==
Diospyros wallichii is native to an area from Myanmar to west Malesia. Its habitat is lowland mixed dipterocarp forests and limestone hills to 700 metres (2,300 ft) elevation.
