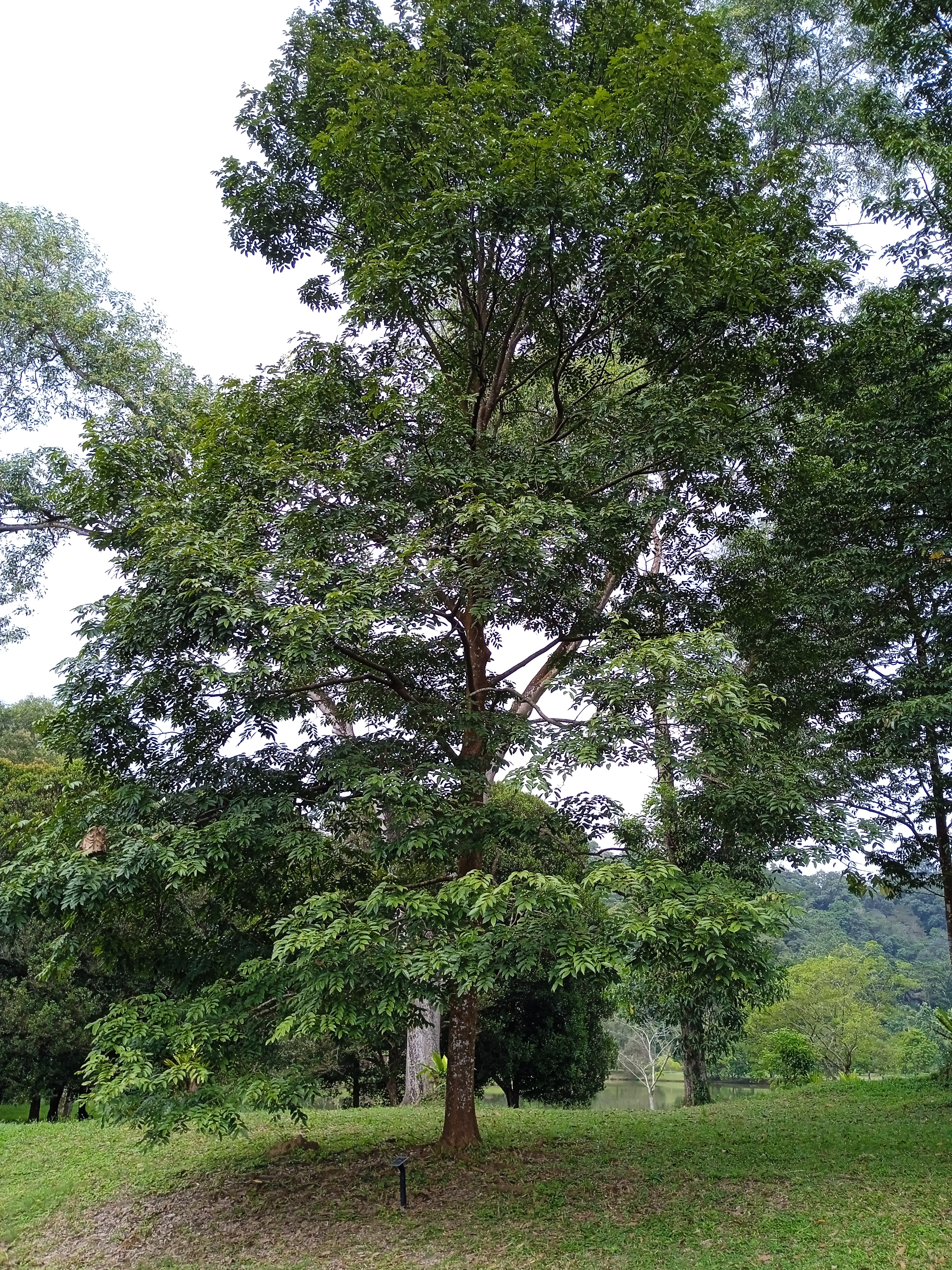
- At Kepong Botanical Garden, Kuala Lumpur

Conservation status
- Least Concern (IUCN 3.1)

Scientific classification
- Kingdom: Plantae
- Clade: Embryophytes
- Clade: Tracheophytes
- Clade: Spermatophytes
- Clade: Angiosperms
- Clade: Eudicots
- Clade: Rosids
- Order: Fabales
- Family: Fabaceae
- Genus: Koompassia
- Species: K. malaccensis

Binomial name
- Koompassia malaccensis Maingay

Synonyms
- Koompassia beccariana Taub.

= Koompassia malaccensis =

Species of legume

Koompassia malaccensis is a tropical rainforest tree species up to 60 m tall in the bean family Fabaceae, subfamily Dialioideae. It is native to Peninsular Malaysia, Singapore, Borneo and Thailand, found in lowland forests up to altitudes of 800 m. It is among the tallest rainforest trees in the world, with one individual reaching 80.72 m (264.8 ft) in height. It is threatened by habitat loss. A common name for this wood is kempas, it is used as a flooring material, firewood, and charcoal.
