= B. poeppigii =

B. poeppigii may refer to:

- Bromelia poeppigii, a Peruvian epiphyte
- Bufo poeppigii, a South American toad
