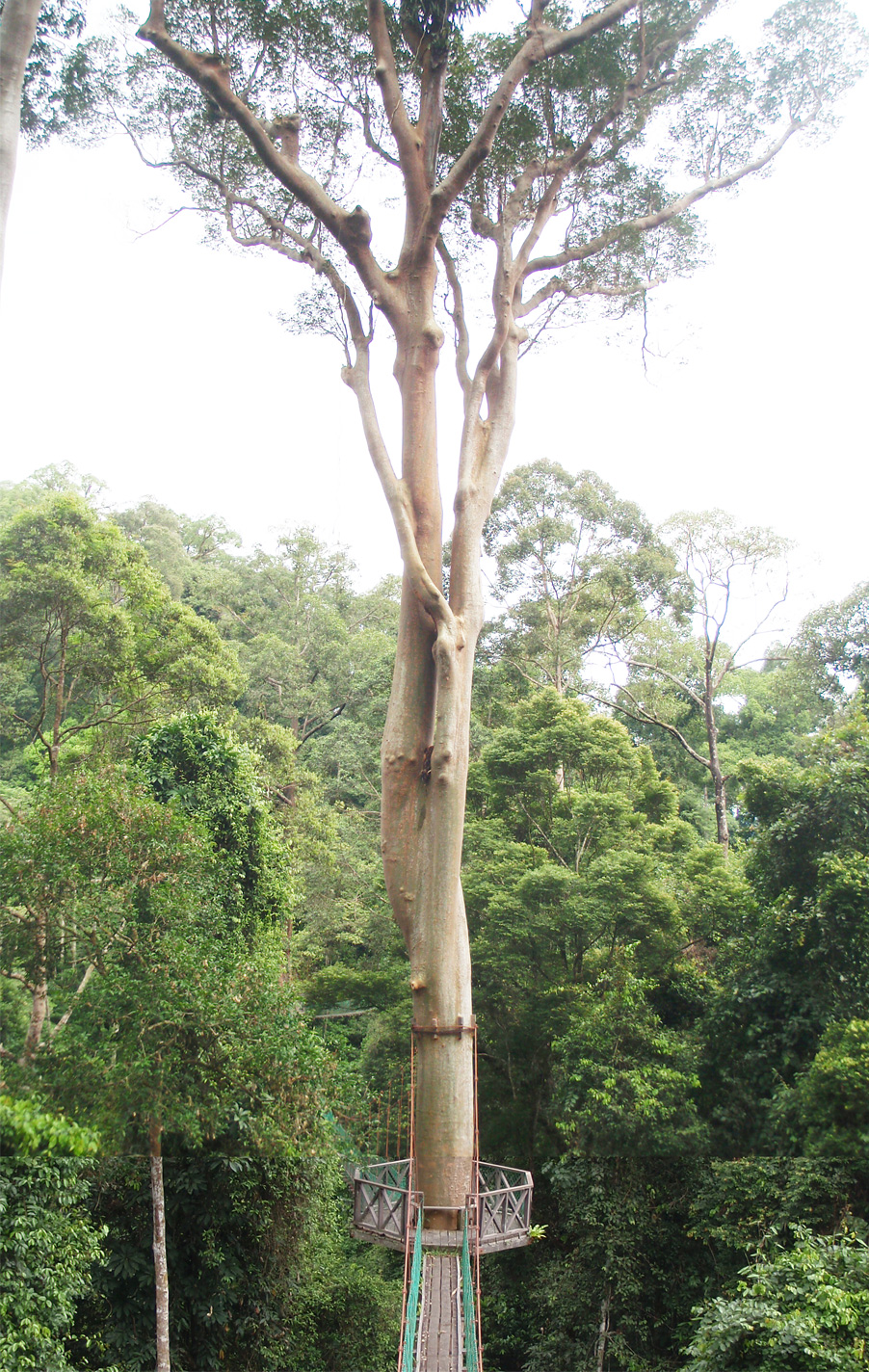
- Koompassia excelsa

Scientific classification
- Kingdom: Plantae
- Clade: Tracheophytes
- Clade: Angiosperms
- Clade: Eudicots
- Clade: Rosids
- Order: Fabales
- Family: Fabaceae
- Subfamily: Dialioideae
- Genus: Koompassia; Maingay ex Benth. (1873)

Synonyms
- Abauria Becc. (1877)

= Koompassia =

Genus of legumes

Koompassia is a genus of legume in the family Fabaceae. It includes three species with range across southeast Asia, from Thailand to New Guinea. It belongs to the subfamily Dialioideae. They are tall tropical forest trees; K. excelsa is one of the tallest tree species in the tropics.

== Species ==
Plants of the World Online includes:

- Koompassia excelsa (Becc.) Taub. – Thailand, Peninsular Malaysia, Sumatra, Borneo, and Philippines
- Koompassia grandiflora Kosterm. – New Guinea
- Koompassia malaccensis Maingay – Thailand, Peninsular Malaysia, and Borneo
