= Leioproctus crispus =

Scientific classification
- Kingdom: Animalia
- Phylum: Arthropoda
- Clade: Pancrustacea
- Class: Insecta
- Order: Hymenoptera
- Family: Colletidae
- Genus: Leioproctus
- Species: L. crispus

Binomial name
- Leioproctus crispus Batley, 2013

Species of bee

Leioproctus crispus, or Leioproctus (Protomorpha) crispus, is a species of bee in the family Colletidae and subfamily Colletinae. It is endemic to Australia. It was described by entomologist Michael Batley in 2013.

== Etymology ==
The specific epithet crispus (Latin: "curly") refers to the facial hair of the female.

== Description ==
Male body length is about 6.8 mm, head width 2.1 mm; female body length 7.5 mm, head width 2.3 mm. Integumental colouration is mainly black and brown; the hair is white to brown.

== Distribution and habitat ==
The species occurs in inland eastern Australia. The type locality is 24 km south-west of Charleville, Queensland.

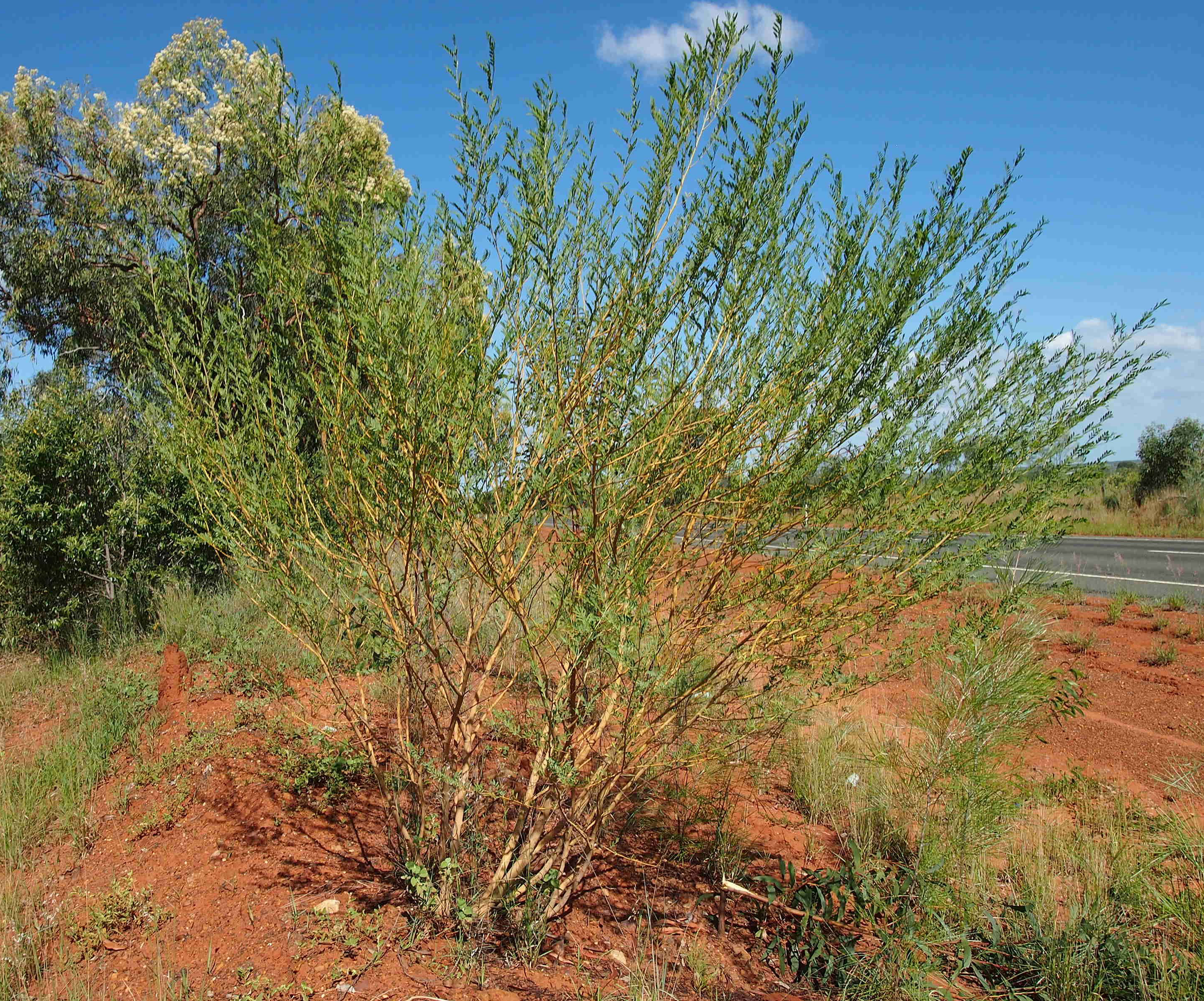
Petalostylis labicheoides (butterfly bush), a forage plant of the bees

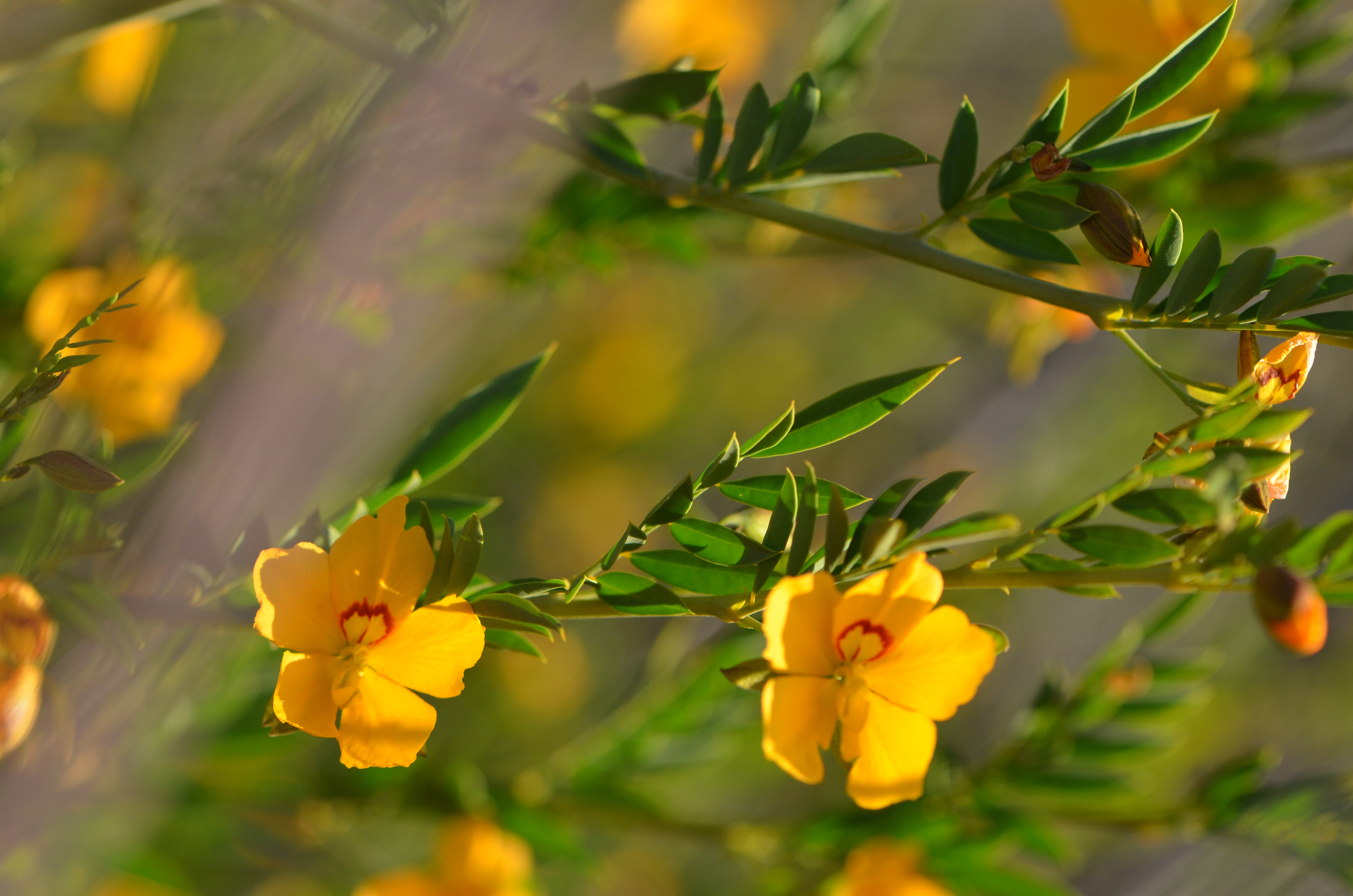
Petalostylis labichoides flowers

== Behaviour ==
The adults are flying mellivores. Flowering plants visited by the bees include Eremophila gilesii, Petalostylis labicheoides and Stemodia glabella.
