= Philodendron cruentum =

Scientific classification
- Kingdom: Plantae
- Clade: Tracheophytes
- Clade: Angiosperms
- Clade: Monocots
- Order: Alismatales
- Family: Araceae
- Genus: Philodendron
- Species: P. cruentum

Binomial name
- Philodendron cruentum Poepp.

Species of plant

Philodendron cruentum, the redleaf, is a species of flowering plant in the family Araceae, native to Peru. A climber, it has striking red markings on its leaves. It is currently only found in the collections of aroid enthusiasts, but is attractive, easy to care for, and has the potential to become a better-known houseplant.

== See also ==
- List of Philodendron species
