= Diospyros maingayi =

Conservation status
- Near Threatened (IUCN 3.1)

Scientific classification
- Kingdom: Plantae
- Clade: Tracheophytes
- Clade: Angiosperms
- Clade: Eudicots
- Clade: Asterids
- Order: Ericales
- Family: Ebenaceae
- Genus: Diospyros
- Species: D. maingayi

Binomial name
- Diospyros maingayi (Hiern) Bakh.

Synonyms
- Diospyros bilocularis Oliv.; Ebenus maingayi (Hiern) Kuntze; Maba maingayi Hiern

Species of flowering plant

Diospyros maingayi is a tree in the family Ebenaceae. It is native to Southeast Asia.

== Description ==
Diospyros maingayi grows up to 30 m (100 ft) tall. The twigs dry black. Inflorescences bear up to four yellow flowers. The orange fruits are oblong to ellipsoid, measuring up to 5 cm (2 in) long.

== Taxonomy ==
Diospyros maingayi was first described as Maba maingayi by the British botanist William Philip Hiern in the Transactions of the Cambridge Philosophical Society in 1873. In 1933 the Dutch botanist Reinier van den Brink transferred the species to the genus Diospyros. The type specimen was collected in Malacca in Peninsular Malaysia. The species is named for the British botanist Alexander Carroll Maingay.

== Distribution and habitat ==
Diospyros maingayi is native to Peninsular Malaysia, Singapore, Thailand, Sumatra, and Borneo. Its habitat is peat swamp and other lowland forests, to elevations of 1,100 m (3,600 ft).

== Conservation ==
Diospyros maingayi has been assessed as near threatened on the IUCN Red List. It is threatened by deforestation and logging for its ebony wood. It is also threatened by conversion of land for agriculture, including palm oil plantations, and for urban development. Climate change is increasing the risk of landslides, fires and sea level rise in the species' habitat. However the species is present in numerous protected areas in Malaysia and Singapore, including Bukit Timah Nature Reserve.
