= Martiusia =

Martiusia is the scientific name of two no longer recognized plant genera and may refer to:

- Martiusia Schult. (1822); a synonym of Clitoria
- Martiusia Benth. (1840); a synonym of Martiodendron
