= Z. insignis =

Z. insignis may refer to:

- Zenia insignis, a plant species found in China and Vietnam
- Zenkerella insignis, the Cameroon scaly-tail or flightless scaly-tailed squirrel, a rodent species found in Cameroon, Central African Republic and Gabon
