= Koompassia grandiflora =

Conservation status
- Vulnerable (IUCN 3.1)

Scientific classification
- Kingdom: Plantae
- Clade: Embryophytes
- Clade: Tracheophytes
- Clade: Spermatophytes
- Clade: Angiosperms
- Clade: Eudicots
- Clade: Rosids
- Order: Fabales
- Family: Fabaceae
- Genus: Koompassia
- Species: K. grandiflora

Binomial name
- Koompassia grandiflora Kosterm.

Species of legume

Koompassia grandiflora is a species of plant in the family Fabaceae. It is found in West Papua (Indonesia) and Papua New Guinea. It is threatened by habitat loss.
