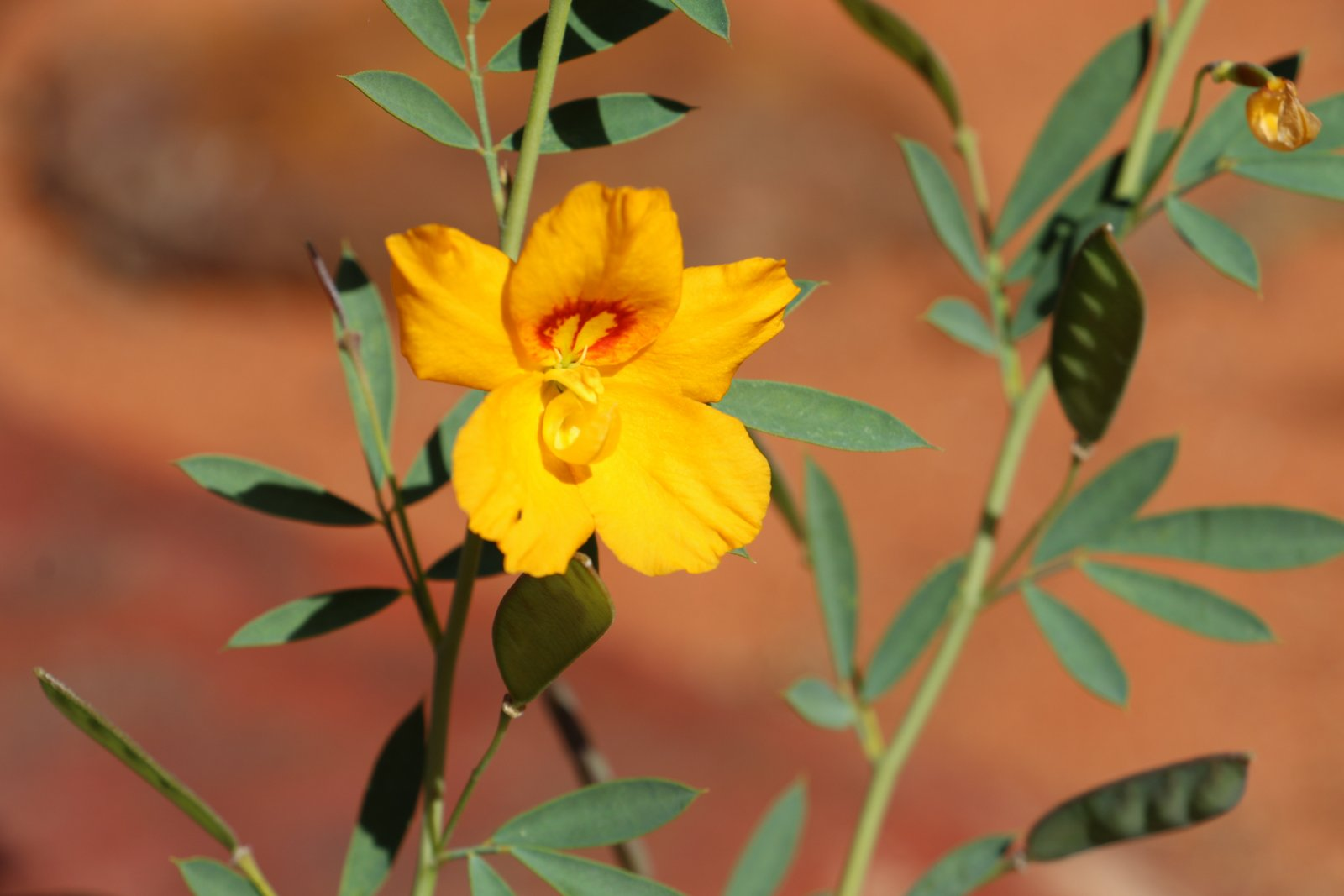

Scientific classification
- Kingdom: Plantae
- Clade: Tracheophytes
- Clade: Angiosperms
- Clade: Eudicots
- Clade: Rosids
- Order: Fabales
- Family: Fabaceae
- Genus: Petalostylis
- Species: P. labicheoides

Binomial name
- Petalostylis labicheoides R.Br.

= Petalostylis labicheoides =

Butterfly bush

Species of flowering plant

Petalostylis labicheoides commonly known as butterfly bush, is a flowering plant in the family Fabaceae. It is an upright, rounded perennial with yellow to orange petals and grows in Queensland, Western Australia, South Australia and New South Wales.

== Description ==
Petalostylis labicheoides is an upright, large, rounded shrub 1–3 m (3 ft 3 in – 9 ft 10 in) high and branching from the base. The leaf rachis is 1.5–6 cm (0.59–2.36 in) long with usually 5-21 alternate leaflets, lance to elliptic shaped or oblong to oblong lance-shaped, 15–30 mm (0.59–1.18 in) long, 4–8 mm (0.16–0.31 in) wide, occasional hairs and tapering to a point at the apex. The flowers have three upper and two lower yellow to orange egg-shaped petals, 20 mm (0.79 in) long with a reddish splotch in the centre. Flowering occurs mostly in spring and the fruit is a more or less a flattened, leathery, pod 2–3 cm (0.79–1.18 in) long.

== Taxonomy and naming ==
Petalostylis labicheoides was first formally described in 1849 by Robert Brown and the description was published in Narrative of an Expedition into Central Australia. The specific epithet (labicheoides) means like the genus Labichea.

== Distribution and habitat ==
Butterfly bush grows on rocky soils near watercourses, dunes, sand plains and rocky ridges in New South Wales, Western Australia South Australia and Queensland.
