= Mendoravia =

Conservation status
- Endangered (IUCN 3.1)

Scientific classification
- Kingdom: Plantae
- Clade: Tracheophytes
- Clade: Angiosperms
- Clade: Eudicots
- Clade: Rosids
- Order: Fabales
- Family: Fabaceae
- Subfamily: Dialioideae
- Genus: Mendoravia; Capuron (1968)
- Species: M. dumaziana

Binomial name
- Mendoravia dumaziana Capuron (1968)

Genus of legumes

Mendoravia is a genus of flowering plants in the family Fabaceae. It belongs to the subfamily Dialioideae. It contains a single species, Mendoravia dumaziana, a tree endemic to southeastern Madagascar. It is known by the common names mendoravy, mendoravy fotsy, and mendoravy mainty.
