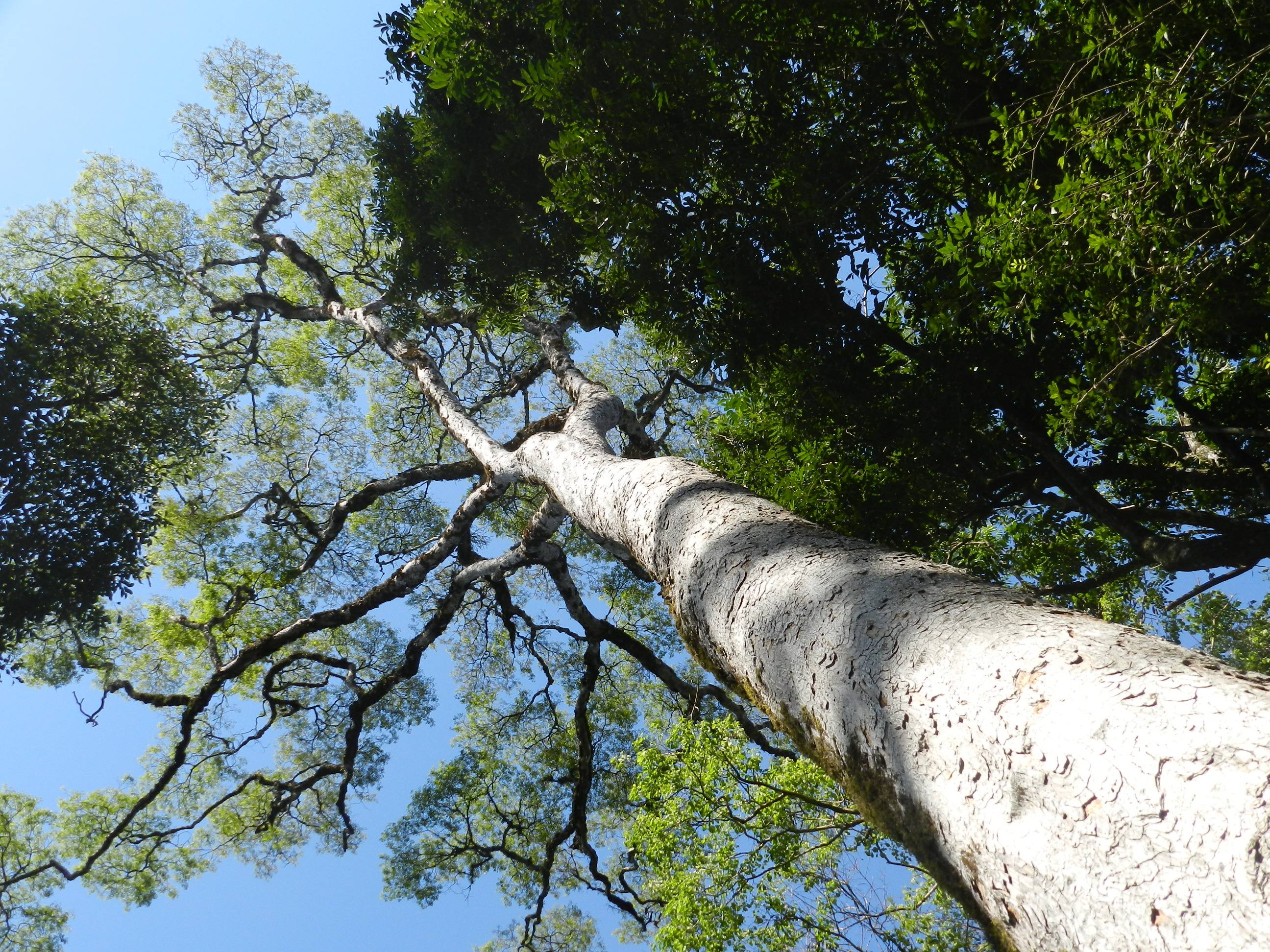

Conservation status
- Least Concern (IUCN 3.1)

Scientific classification
- Kingdom: Plantae
- Clade: Tracheophytes
- Clade: Angiosperms
- Clade: Eudicots
- Clade: Rosids
- Order: Fabales
- Family: Fabaceae
- Subfamily: Dialioideae
- Genus: Apuleia; Mart.
- Species: A. leiocarpa

Binomial name
- Apuleia leiocarpa (Vogel) J.F.Macbr. (1919)

Synonyms
- Apuleja Gaertn.; Apuleia Mart.; Apoleya leiocarpa (Vogel) Gleason; Apoleya molaris (Spruce ex Benth.) Gleason (1935); Apuleia grazielana Afr.Fern. (1994), holotype not indicated.; Apuleia molaris Spruce ex Benth. (1870); Apuleia praecox Mart. (1837); Dalbergia cucullata Pittier in Bol. Soc. Venez. Ci. Nat. 8: 261 (1943); Leptolobium leiocarpum Vogel (1837); Platymiscium ellipticum Rusby in Bull. New York Bot. Gard. 6: 514 (1910); Zenkeria Arn. (1838), nom. illeg.; Zenkeria dalbergioides Arn. (1838); Zenkeria lundii Didr. (1853)

= Apuleia =

Genus of legumes

Apuleia is a genus of flowering plants in the family Fabaceae. It belongs to the subfamily Dialioideae. The only species in the genus is Apuleia leiocarpa. It is a tree native to northern South America, from Colombia and Venezuela to Ecuador, Peru, Bolivia, Brazil, Paraguay, Uruguay, and northeastern Argentina.

== Description ==
It has a flattened, wide, dense crown. It reaches 25–40 m (82–131 ft) in height, with a slightly tortuous and very long trunk, with fins at the base. Rhytidoma that splits into discs. Leaves imparipinadas composed, 05.11 leaflets 6 cm (2.4 in) long. It has small white flowers in clusters, blooming when the leaves fall. The legume fruit is 4 cm (1.6 in) long, with 2-3 seeds, which are 5 mm (0.20 in) and difficult to extract.

It flowers (austral) from September to November, fruiting from October to December, and seed is harvested from November to February.

== Ecology ==
It belongs to the upper stratum of tall forests. It reproduces very abundantly in secondary forests; sometimes in pure groupings. It abounds in skirts and highs. It grows very slowly, until its middle age, which grows at a rate of 80–100 mm (3.1–3.9 in) in height per year. It is heliophyte, but partly sciophyte.

== Wood ==
It is yellow, with a specific gravity of 0.8 g / cm^{3}, with good workability. It has high resistance to weathering and is dimensionally stable. For construction, door frames, windows, bodywork, floors, coatings. In Colombia there is the maquí, whose sawdust (from wood) produces rasquiña and belongs to the genus Apuleia and grows in the middle Magadalena region and the Uraba region, its specific gravity is similar to 1 g / cm^{3}.

== Taxonomy ==
Apuleia leiocarpa was first described by Julius Rudolph Theodor Vogel in 1919 and published in contributions from the Gray Herbarium of Harvard University.
