= Storckiella vitiensis =

- Plate by Walter Hood Fitch, 1865

Conservation status
- Vulnerable (IUCN 2.3)

Scientific classification
- Kingdom: Plantae
- Clade: Embryophytes
- Clade: Tracheophytes
- Clade: Spermatophytes
- Clade: Angiosperms
- Clade: Eudicots
- Clade: Rosids
- Order: Fabales
- Family: Fabaceae
- Genus: Storckiella
- Species: S. vitiensis

Binomial name
- Storckiella vitiensis Seem.

Species of legume

Storckiella vitiensis is a species of plant in the family Fabaceae. It is found only in Fiji.
