= Uittienia =

Scientific classification
- Kingdom: Plantae
- Clade: Tracheophytes
- Clade: Angiosperms
- Clade: Eudicots
- Clade: Rosids
- Order: Fabales
- Family: Fabaceae
- Subfamily: Dialioideae
- Genus: Uittienia; Steenis (1948)
- Species: U. modesta

Binomial name
- Uittienia modesta Steenis (1948)

Synonyms
- Dialium modestum (Steenis) Steyaert (1953)

Genus of legumes

Uittienia modesta is a species of flowering plant in the legume family, Fabaceae. It is a tree native to Borneo and Sumatra. It is the sole species in genus Uittienia, which belongs to subfamily Dialioideae.
