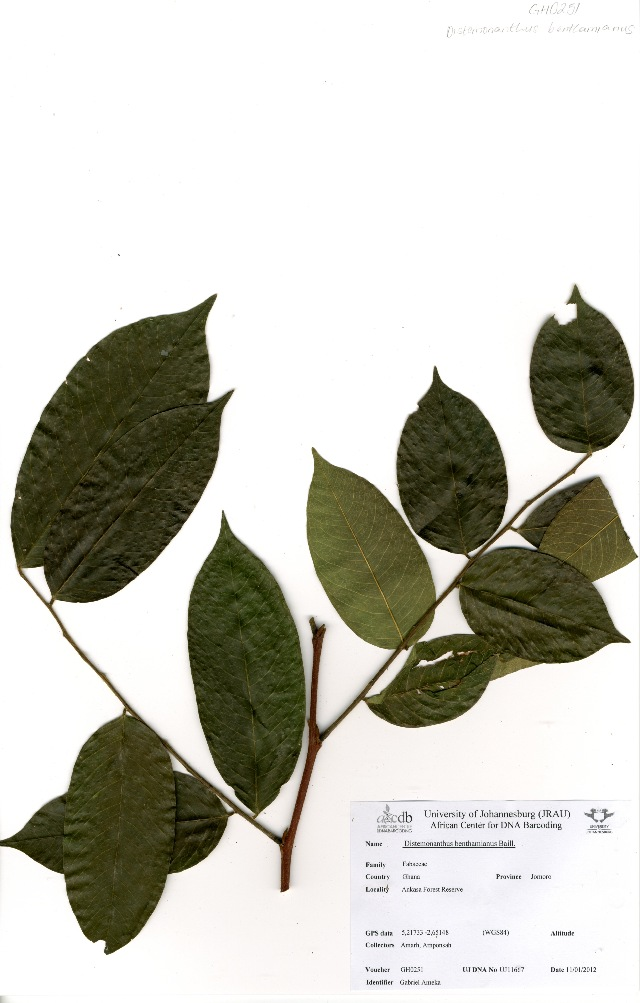

Scientific classification
- Kingdom: Plantae
- Clade: Embryophytes
- Clade: Tracheophytes
- Clade: Spermatophytes
- Clade: Angiosperms
- Clade: Eudicots
- Clade: Rosids
- Order: Fabales
- Family: Fabaceae
- Subfamily: Dialioideae
- Genus: Distemonanthus; Benth.
- Species: D. benthamianus

Binomial name
- Distemonanthus benthamianus Baill.

= Distemonanthus =

Genus of legumes

Distemonanthus is a genus of flowering plants in the family Fabaceae. It belongs to the subfamily Dialioideae. It contains a single species, Distemonanthus benthamianus, a deciduous tree, which occurs widely but sparsely in the forest regions of Tropical West and Central Africa; it is sometimes confused with Pericopsis laxiflora due to similar morphological features.

Mature heartwood has a moderate resistance to fungi.

== Description ==
A big tree, it grows up to 40 meters tall and 90 cm in diameter. Trunk is straight but can sometimes be slightly sinuous; fairly spreading buttress roots at the base, free of branches for up to 20 meters. Bark, brown - reddish brown. Leaves, pinnately compound arrangement, 7 - 10 leaflets. Leaf-blade, ovate - elliptical in outline. Fruit, indehiscent pods.

== Distribution ==
The tree grows in the high forest of West and Central Africa. It occurs in Gabon, Central African Republic, Nigeria, Ghana, Cameroon. In Gabon, it is known as Movingui.

== Uses ==
Parts of the root is used as a chewing stick for dental hygiene in parts of Nigeria. Bark extracts are used to treat incidents of diarrhea by traditional health practitioners. Used also for decorative veneers and joinery.
