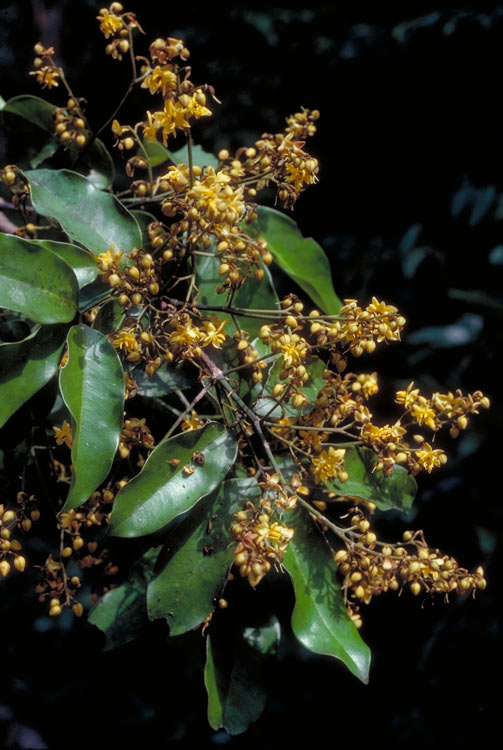
- Storckiella australiensis

Scientific classification
- Kingdom: Plantae
- Clade: Tracheophytes
- Clade: Angiosperms
- Clade: Eudicots
- Clade: Rosids
- Order: Fabales
- Family: Fabaceae
- Subfamily: Dialioideae
- Genus: Storckiella; Seem.

Species
- See text

Synonyms
- Doga (Baill.) Baill. ex Nakai

= Storckiella =

Genus of legumes

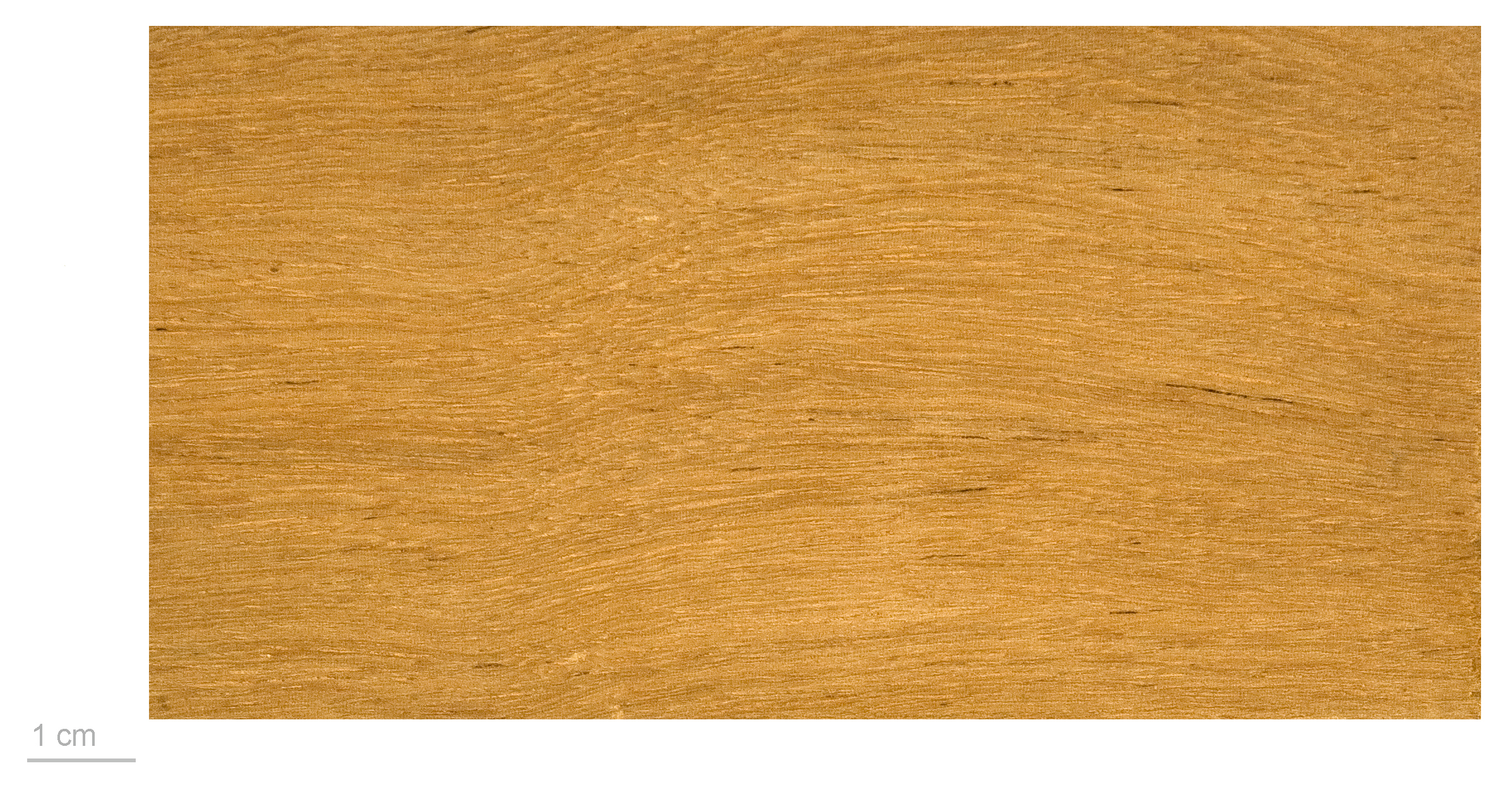
Storckiella pancheri wood - MHNT

Storckiella is a genus of four recognised species of trees, of the plant family Fabaceae. It belongs to the subfamily Dialioideae. They grow naturally in New Caledonia, Fiji and Australia.

Those four recognised species, and for one of them two subspecies, are:

- Storckiella australiensis J.H.Ross & B.Hyland – endemic to the luxuriant rainforests of the Queensland Wet Tropics lowlands (max. ca. 100 m (330 ft)), Australia
- Storckiella neocaledonica I.C.Nielsen, Labat & Munzinger – a New Caledonia endemic
- Storckiella pancheri Baill. Synonym: Storckiella comptonii Baker f.
  - subsp. acuta I.C.Nielsen, Labat & Munzinger – a New Caledonia endemic
  - subsp. pancheri – a New Caledonia endemic
- Storckiella vitiensis Seem. – a Fiji endemic
