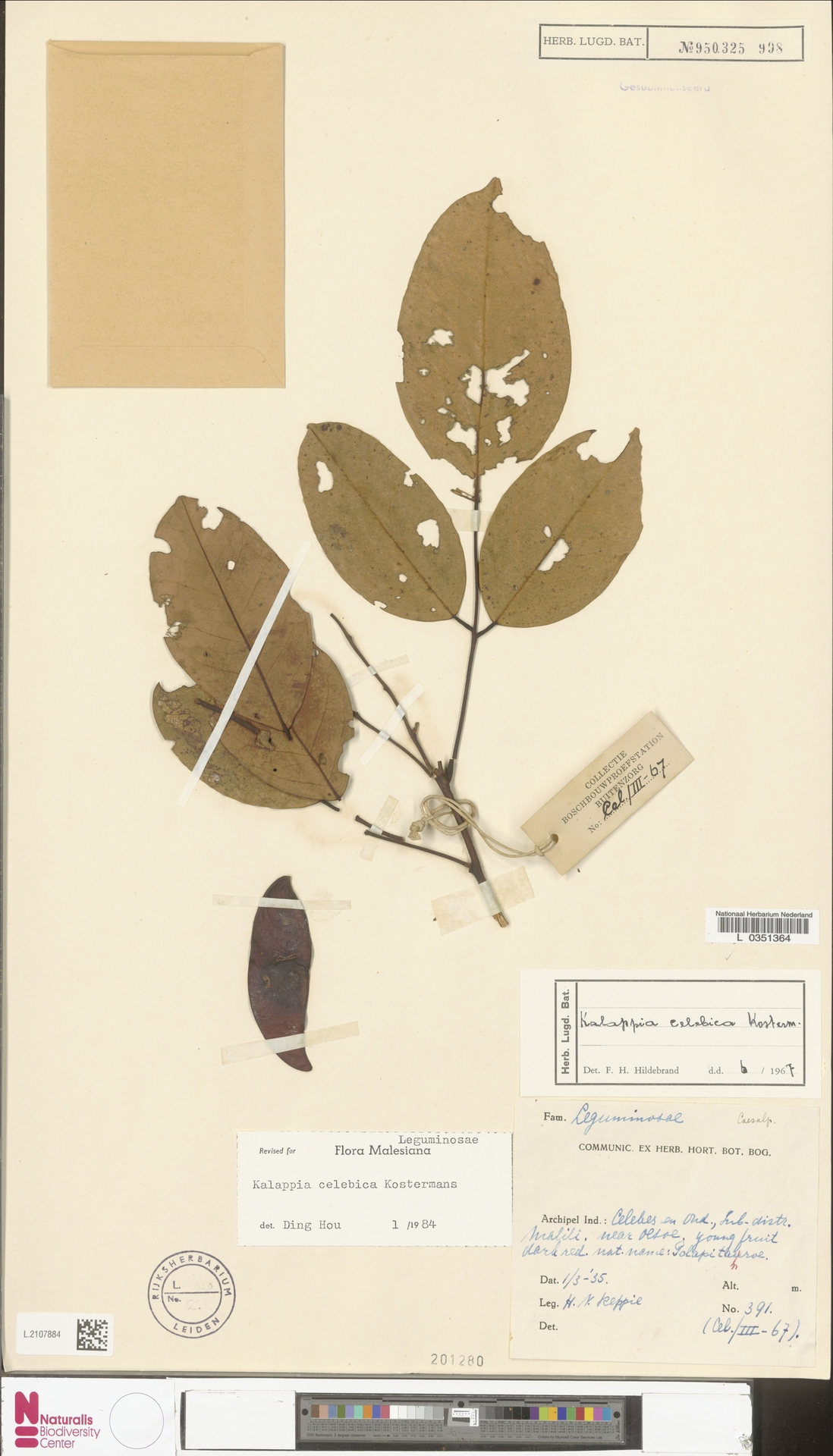

Conservation status
- Vulnerable (IUCN 3.1)

Scientific classification
- Kingdom: Plantae
- Clade: Tracheophytes
- Clade: Angiosperms
- Clade: Eudicots
- Clade: Rosids
- Order: Fabales
- Family: Fabaceae
- Subfamily: Dialioideae
- Genus: Kalappia; Kosterm. (1952)
- Species: K. celebica

Binomial name
- Kalappia celebica Kosterm. (1952)

= Kalappia =

Genus of legumes

Kalappia is a genus of plants in the family Fabaceae. It belongs to the subfamily Dialioideae. Its only species is Kalappia celebica, a tree found only in Sulawesi, Indonesia.
