= Androcalymma =

Scientific classification
- Kingdom: Plantae
- Clade: Tracheophytes
- Clade: Angiosperms
- Clade: Eudicots
- Clade: Rosids
- Order: Fabales
- Family: Fabaceae
- Subfamily: Dialioideae
- Genus: Androcalymma; Dwyer
- Species: A. glabrifolium

Binomial name
- Androcalymma glabrifolium Dwyer

Genus of legumes

Androcalymma is a monotypic genus of South American flowering plants in the family Fabaceae. It belongs to the subfamily Dialioideae. It contains a single species, Androcalymma glabrifolium.
