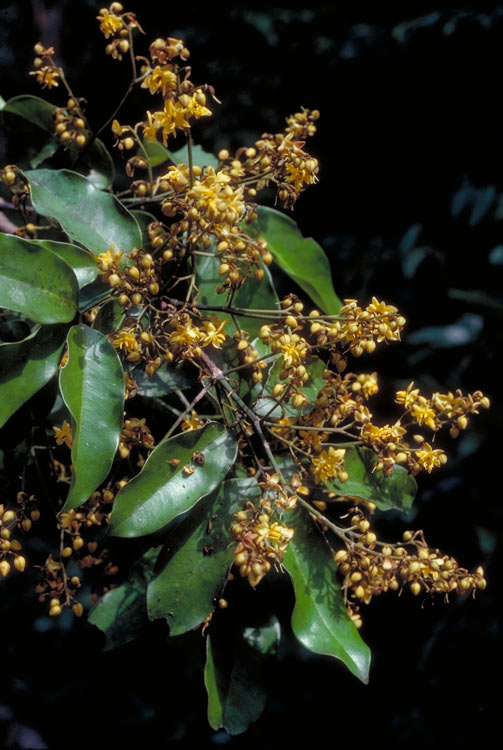

Scientific classification
- Kingdom: Plantae
- Clade: Tracheophytes
- Clade: Angiosperms
- Clade: Eudicots
- Clade: Rosids
- Order: Fabales
- Family: Fabaceae
- Genus: Storckiella
- Species: S. australiensis

Binomial name
- Storckiella australiensis J.H.Ross & B.Hyland

= Storckiella australiensis =

Species of legume

Storckiella australiensis is a species of large rainforest legume trees up to 35 m (115 ft) tall, constituting part of the plant family Fabaceae. It has the common name white bean.

They are endemic to a restricted lowland area of luxuriant rainforests in the wet tropics of northeastern Queensland, Australia.
