= Poeppigia procera =

Conservation status
- Least Concern (IUCN 3.1)

Scientific classification
- Kingdom: Plantae
- Clade: Tracheophytes
- Clade: Angiosperms
- Clade: Eudicots
- Clade: Rosids
- Order: Fabales
- Family: Fabaceae
- Subfamily: Dialioideae
- Genus: Poeppigia
- Species: P. procera

Binomial name
- Poeppigia procera (Poepp. ex Spreng.) C.Presl (1831)

Synonyms
- Caesalpinia procera Poepp. ex Spreng. (1825); Poeppigia excelsa A.Rich. (1846); Poeppigia ferruginea Tul. (1844); Ramirezia cubensis A.Rich. (1846)

Genus of legumes

Poeppigia procera is a species of flowering plant in the family Fabaceae. It is a tree native to the tropical Americas, ranging from southern Mexico to Bolivia and southeastern Brazil, including Cuba. It grows in forest and woodland, savanna, and shrubland.
