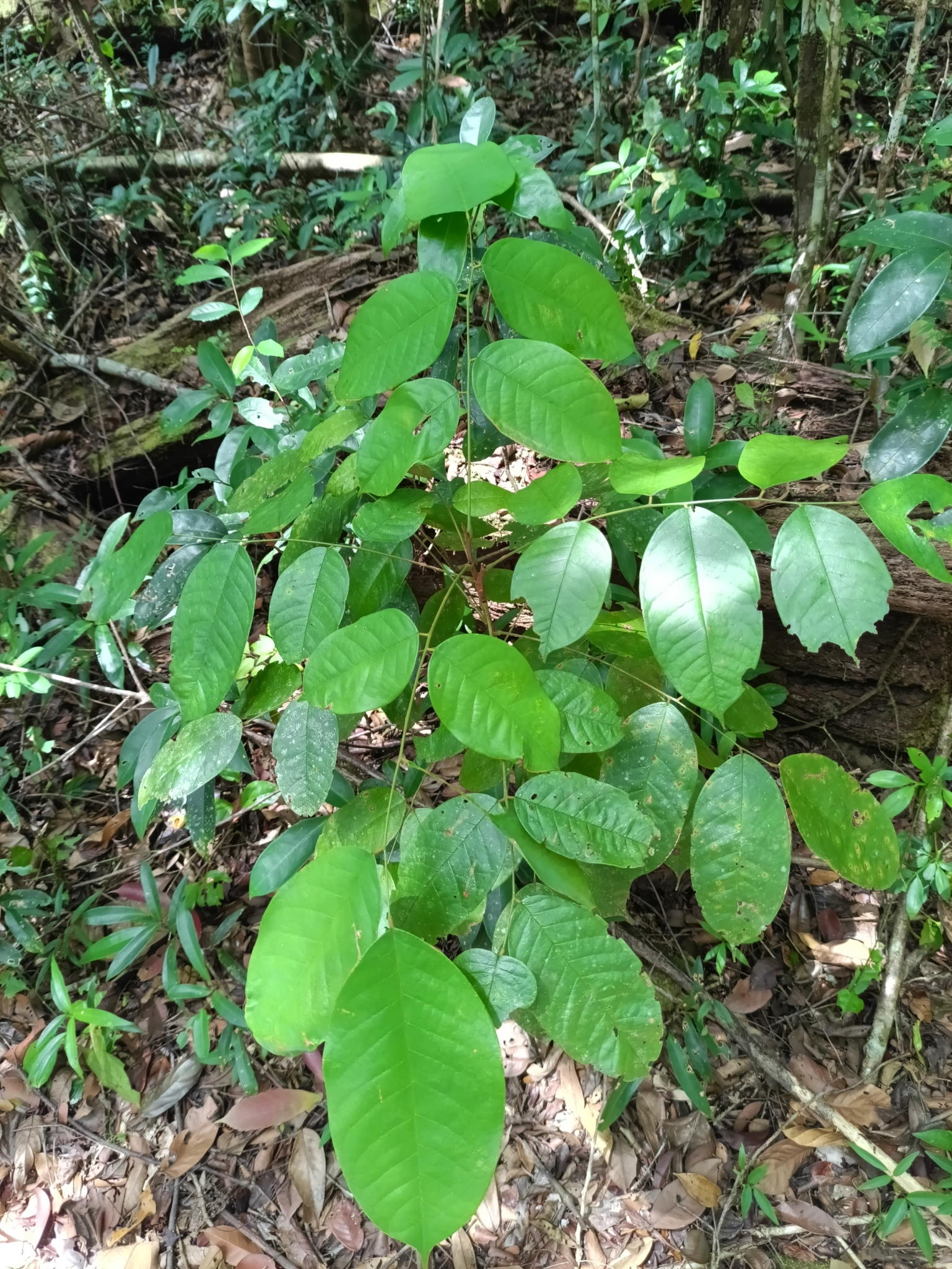
- Dicorynia guianensis in French Guiana

Scientific classification
- Kingdom: Plantae
- Clade: Embryophytes
- Clade: Tracheophytes
- Clade: Spermatophytes
- Clade: Angiosperms
- Clade: Eudicots
- Clade: Rosids
- Order: Fabales
- Family: Fabaceae
- Subfamily: Dialioideae
- Genus: Dicorynia; Benth.

= Dicorynia =

Genus of legumes

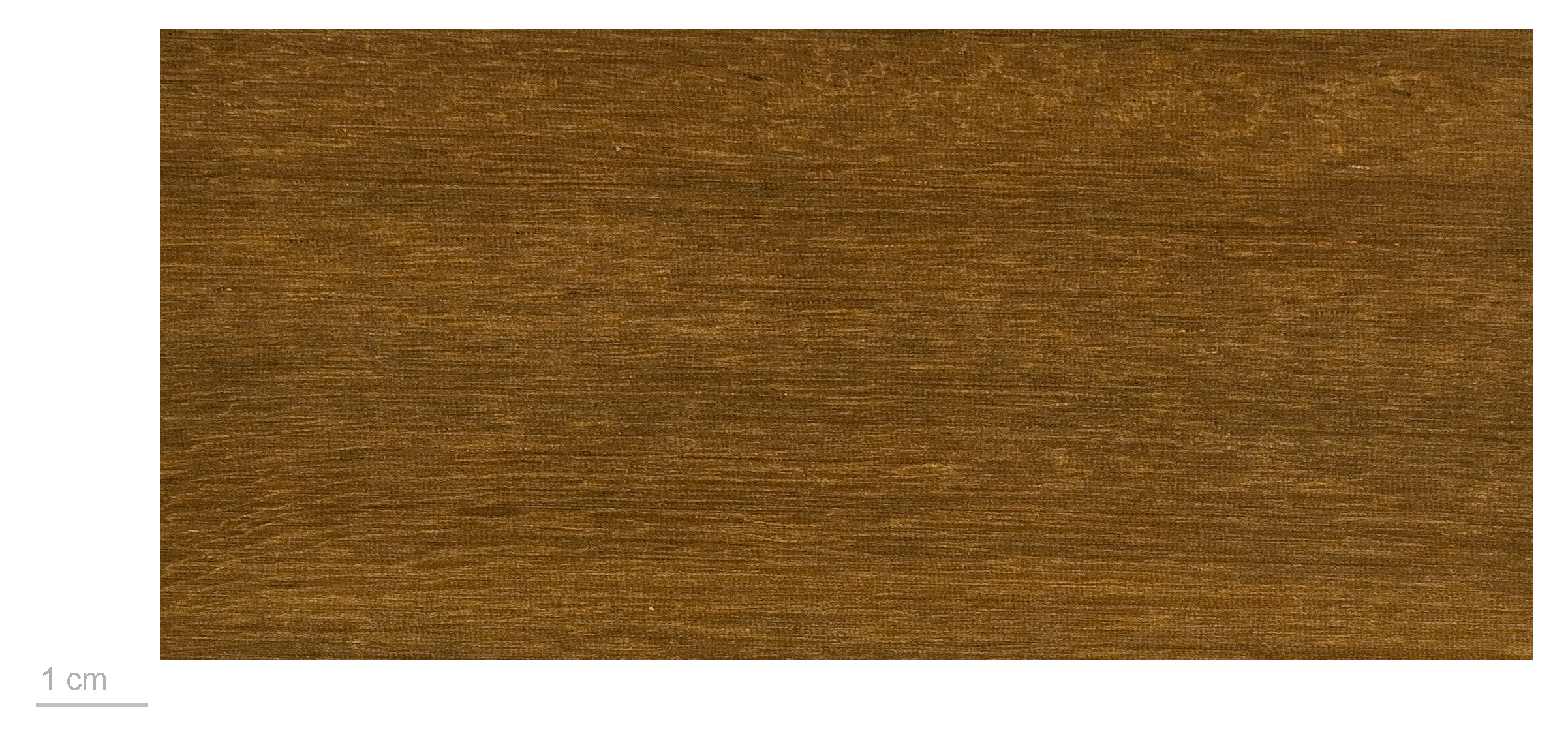
Dicorynia guianensis wood

Dicorynia is a genus of flowering plants in the legume family, Fabaceae. It belongs to the subfamily Dialioideae. It includes two species of trees native to northern South America, ranging through Peru, Colombia, Venezuela, the Guianas, and northern Brazil.

- Dicorynia guianensis Amshoff – the Guianas
- Dicorynia paraensis Benth. – Peru, Colombia, Venezuela, and northern Brazil
