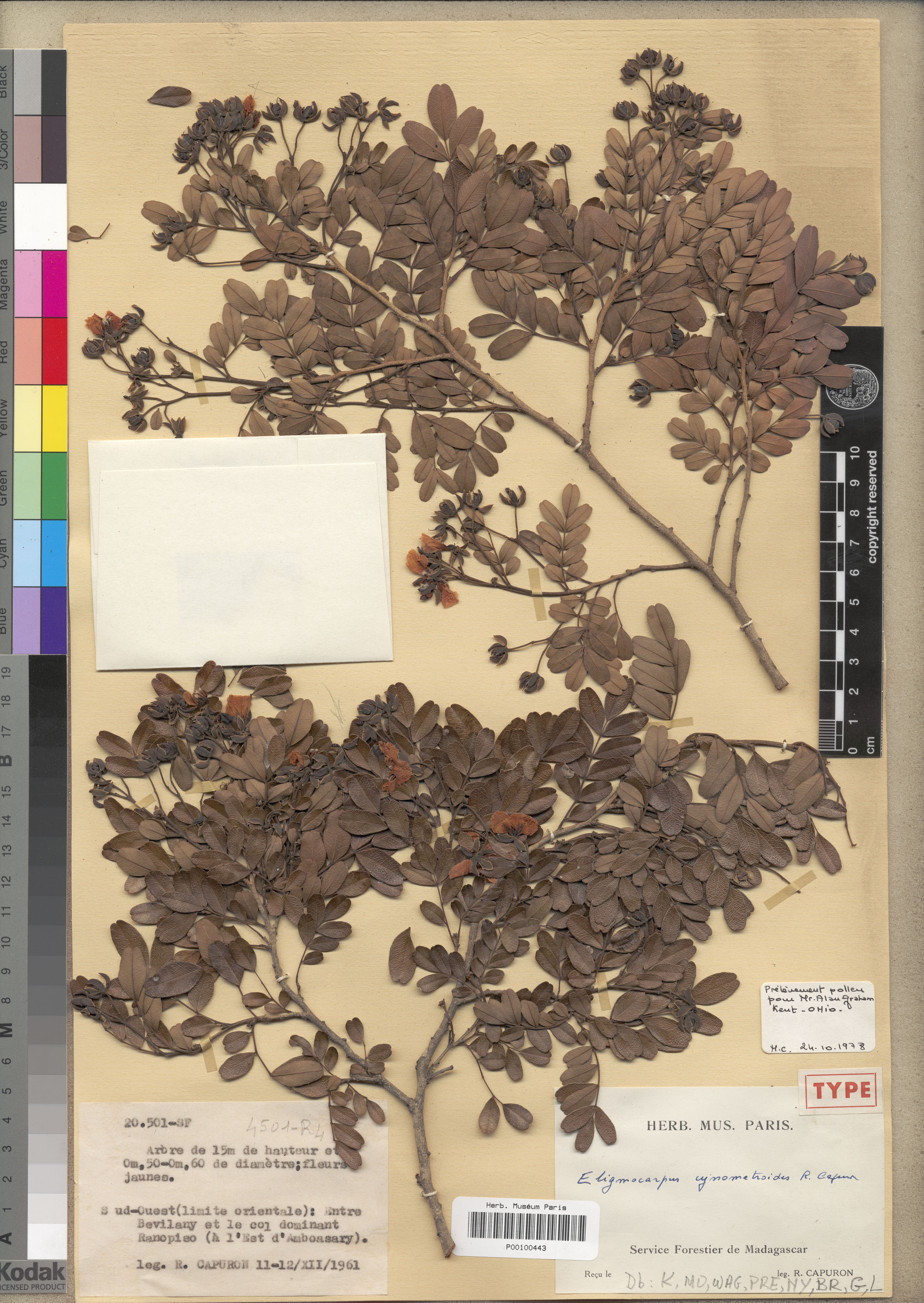

Conservation status
- Critically Endangered (IUCN 3.1)

Scientific classification
- Kingdom: Plantae
- Clade: Tracheophytes
- Clade: Angiosperms
- Clade: Eudicots
- Clade: Rosids
- Order: Fabales
- Family: Fabaceae
- Subfamily: Dialioideae
- Genus: Eligmocarpus; Capuron (1968)
- Species: E. cynometroides

Binomial name
- Eligmocarpus cynometroides Capuron (1968)

= Eligmocarpus =

Genus of legumes

Eligmocarpus is a genus of flowering plants in the family Fabaceae. It belongs to subfamily Dialioideae. It contains a single species, Eligmocarpus cynometroides. It is a tree endemic to southeastern Madagascar. Currently, it occurs only on the edge of a relatively humid spiny forest in Petriky. The species is critically endangered, with only 21 adult trees remaining as of 2012, down from 23 in 2004 and 27 in 2001. The surviving trees do have high genetic diversity. The trees' wood is used as timber by local communities, which has contributed heavily to the species' decline. Prior to human colonization, the species had used streams and rivers to carry its seeds into new biomes, in dry or spiny forests on limestone or sandy soils in humid to subarid climates. The species likely originated in the Andohahela area, which is upstream of all remaining members of the species. The species has a very low rate of seed production (about 1 seed/kg of fruit) and its seed germination is limited (<5% if not treated, increasing to 43% when soaked in cold water for 48 hours).
