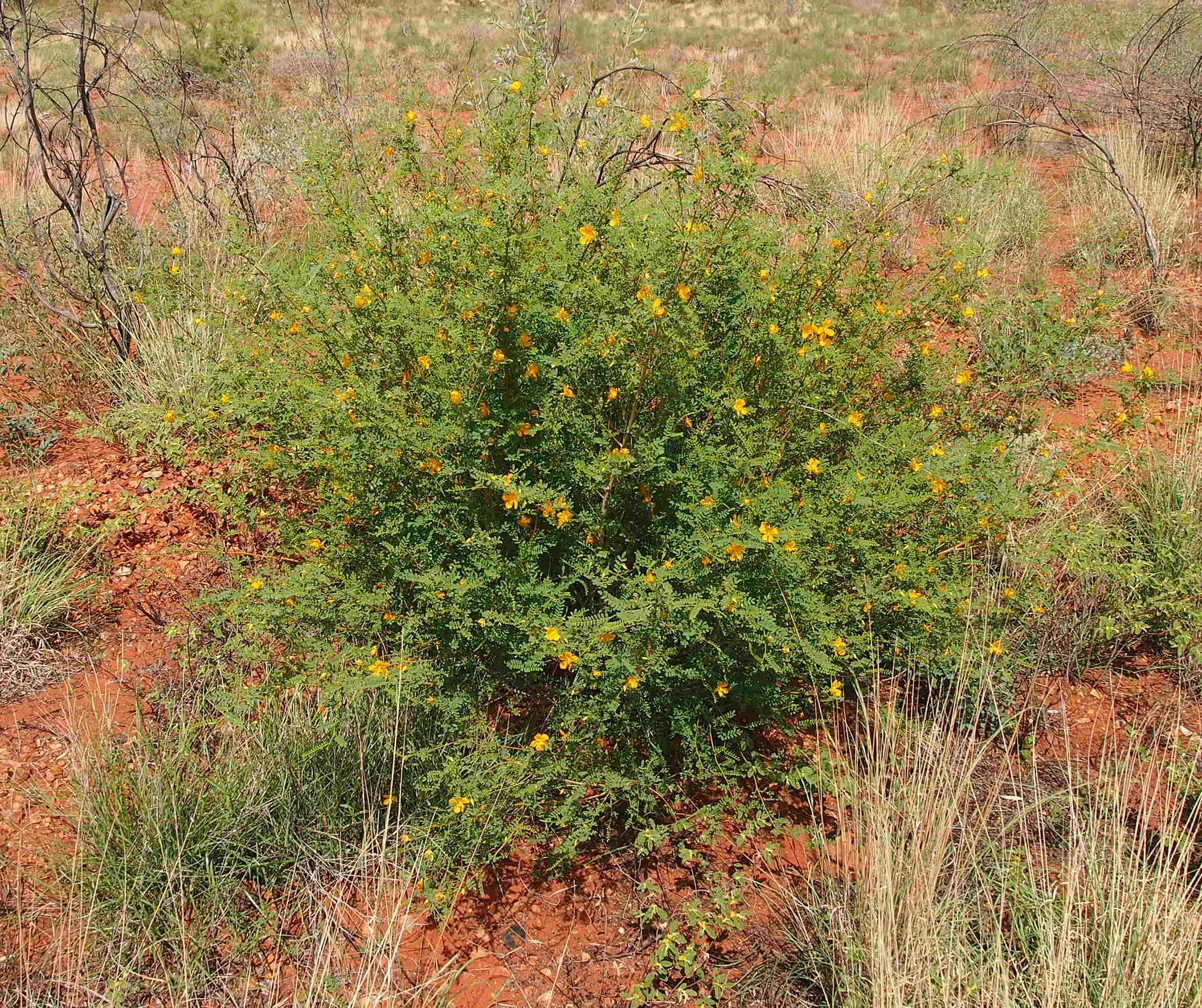
- Petalostylis cassioides

Scientific classification
- Kingdom: Plantae
- Clade: Tracheophytes
- Clade: Angiosperms
- Clade: Eudicots
- Clade: Rosids
- Order: Fabales
- Family: Fabaceae
- Subfamily: Dialioideae
- Genus: Petalostylis; R.Br. (1849)

Species
- Petalostylis cassioides (F.Muell.) Symon; Petalostylis labicheoides R.Br.

Synonyms
- Petalogyne F. Muell. (1856), nom. superfl.

= Petalostylis =

Genus of legumes

Petalostylis is a genus of flowering plants in the legume family Fabaceae. It is endemic to Australia, and includes two species of shrubs native to arid tropical areas of Queensland, New South Wales, South Australia, the Northern Territory, and Western Australia, where it grows on sand plains, stony ridges and rocky outcrops, creek beds, and scree slopes. It belongs to the subfamily Dialioideae.
