= Baudouinia =

Scientific classification
- Kingdom: Plantae
- Clade: Tracheophytes
- Clade: Angiosperms
- Clade: Eudicots
- Clade: Rosids
- Order: Fabales
- Family: Fabaceae
- Subfamily: Dialioideae
- Genus: Baudouinia; Baill. (1866)

Species
- 6; see text

Genus of legumes

Baudouinia is a genus of flowering plants in the legume family, Fabaceae. It includes six species which are all endemic to Madagascar. It belongs to the subfamily Dialioideae.

== Species ==
Baudouinia comprises the following species:

- Baudouinia capuronii Du Puy & R.Rabev.
- Baudouinia fluggeiformis Baill.
- Baudouinia louvelii R.Vig.
- Baudouinia orientalis R.Vig.
- Baudouinia rouxevillei H.Perrier
- Baudouinia sollyaeformis Baill.
