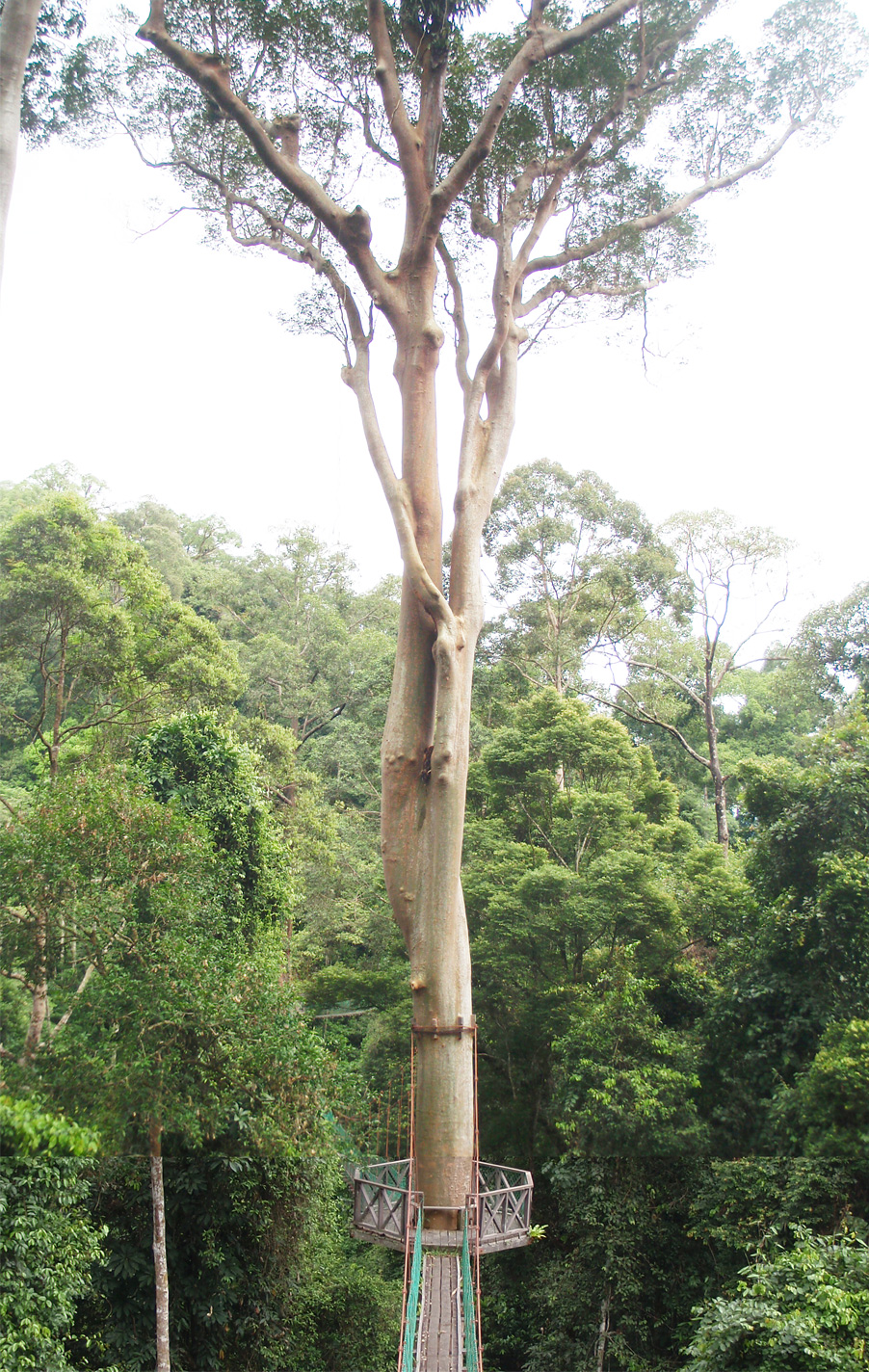

Conservation status
- Near Threatened (IUCN 3.1)

Scientific classification
- Kingdom: Plantae
- Clade: Embryophytes
- Clade: Tracheophytes
- Clade: Angiosperms
- Clade: Eudicots
- Clade: Rosids
- Order: Fabales
- Family: Fabaceae
- Genus: Koompassia
- Species: K. excelsa

Binomial name
- Koompassia excelsa (Becc.) Taub.

Synonyms
- Abauria excelsa Becc. (1877); Koompassia parvifolia Prain

= Koompassia excelsa =

Species of legume

Koompassia excelsa (known as tualang in Peninsular Malaysia, tapang in Sarawak, mangaris in Sabah, and bangris in Kalimantan) is an emergent tropical rainforest tree species in the family Fabaceae. It is found in Indonesia, Brunei, Malaysia, the Philippines, and Thailand. It is one of the tallest tropical tree species: the tallest measured specimen is 85.8 m or 88 m(281 or 289 ft) tall.

These trees grow mostly in lowland rainforests where they tower over the canopy. Like most tall rainforest trees they have huge buttress roots to support their weight. This is because the majority of the nutrients in rainforest soil are very near the surface, making large spreading roots more effective than deep ones.

They grow branches above the canopy (around 30 m or 100 ft) and have slippery trunks which protect them from sun bears, making them in turn attractive to giant honey bees Apis dorsata which hang their huge combs from the branches. The bees also protect the trees from loggers, as the value of the honey is higher than that of the timber.

There is a long history in Borneo of the honey combs being collected by native climbers using bamboo ladders built into the trunk, and protected by smoke. This is reflected in the title of a book of 'Poems and Chants of Sarawak Dayaks'., which expands on the cultural significance of this tree which links the earth to the sky.

Logging tapang trees is a native taboo in parts of Sarawak, and only naturally fallen trees (due to storms) are used for timber.

The species was first described as Abauria excelsa by Odoardo Beccari in 1877. In 1892 Paul Hermann Wilhelm Taubert placed the species in genus Koompassia as K. excelsa.

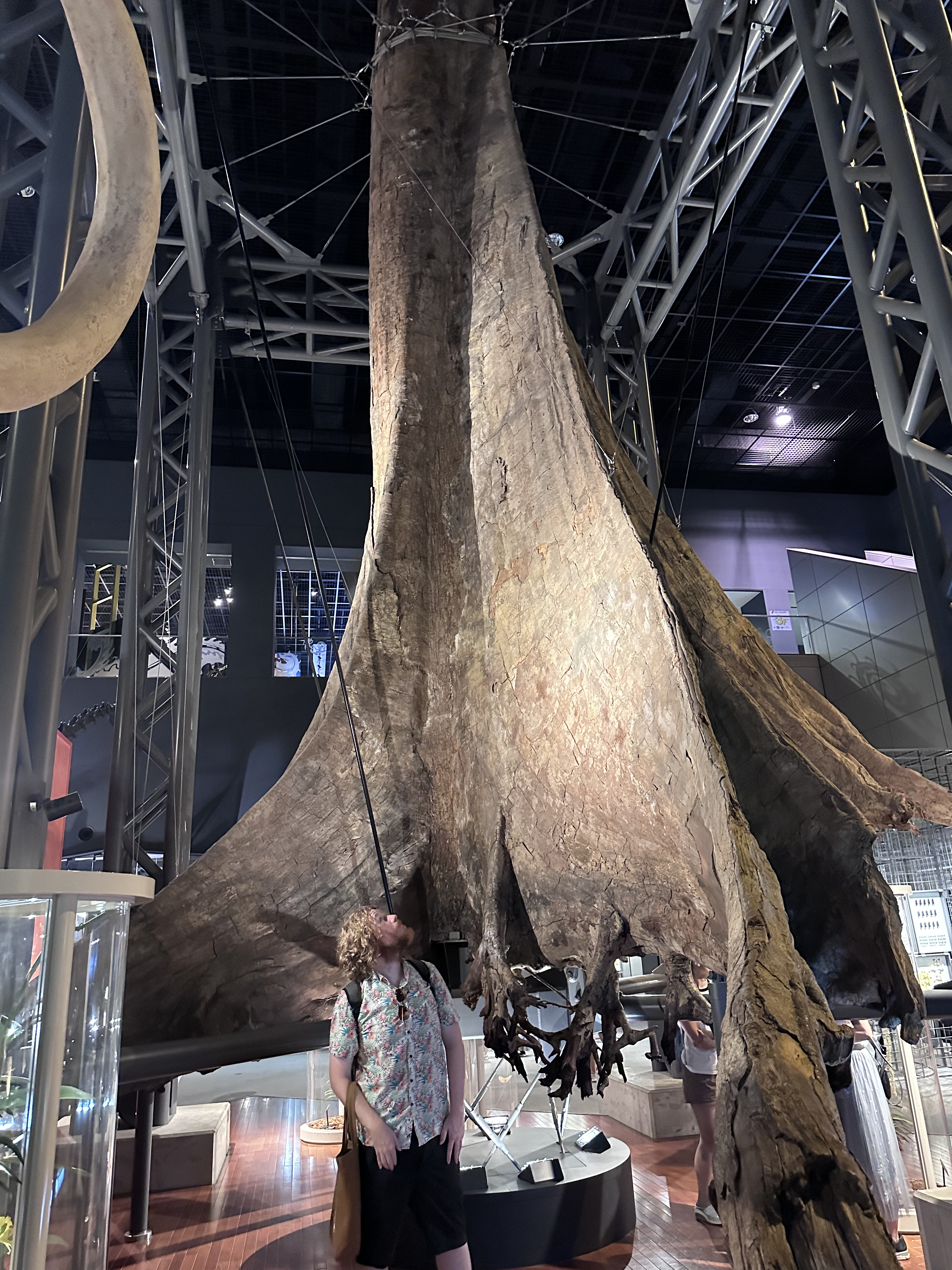
The large buttress roots of Koompassia excelsa

== See also ==
- List of superlative trees: The world's tallest tree species
