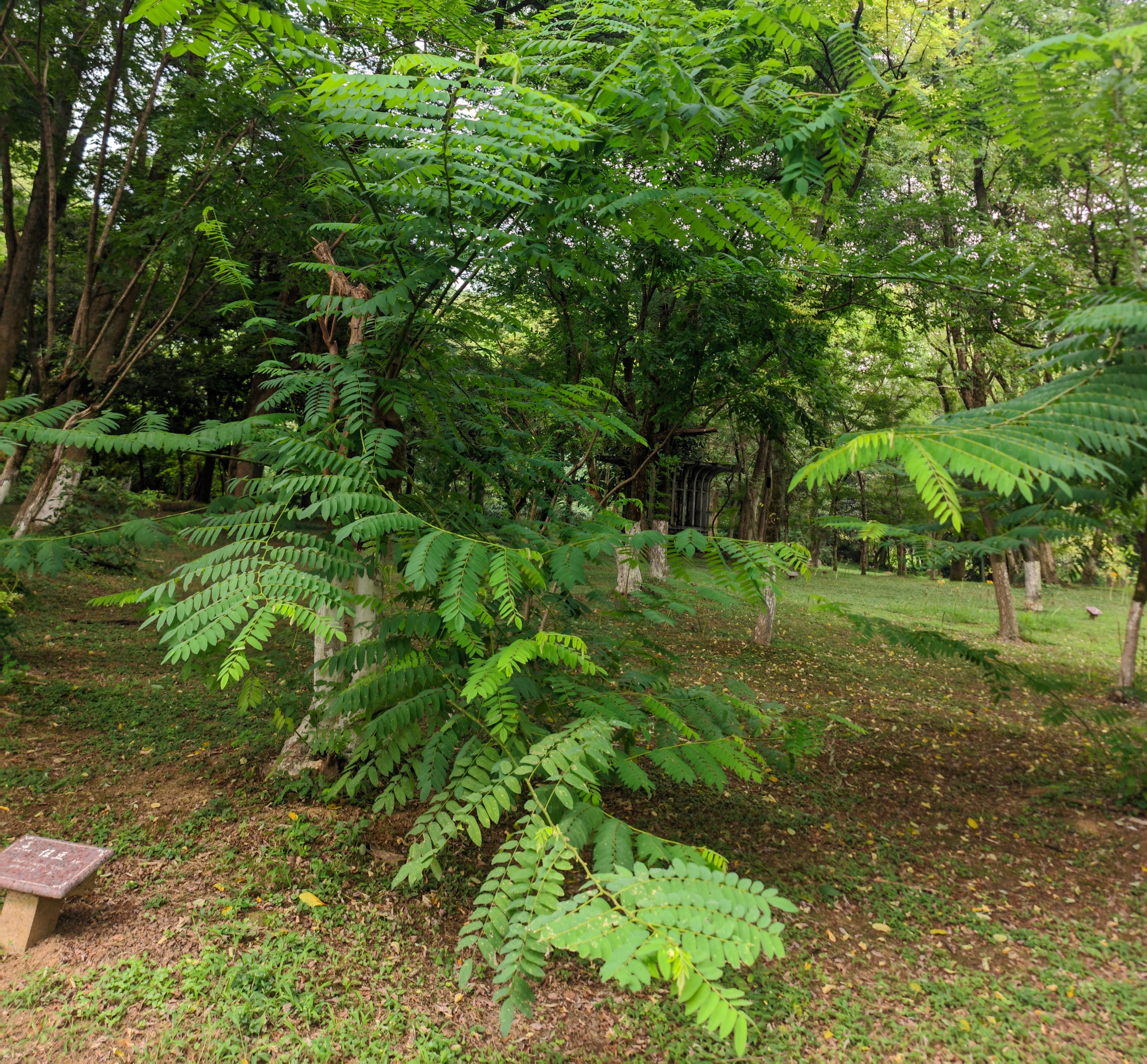
- Zenia insignis in Hangzhou Botanical Garden, Zhejiang

Conservation status
- Near Threatened (IUCN 2.3)

Scientific classification
- Kingdom: Plantae
- Clade: Embryophytes
- Clade: Tracheophytes
- Clade: Spermatophytes
- Clade: Angiosperms
- Clade: Eudicots
- Clade: Rosids
- Order: Fabales
- Family: Fabaceae
- Subfamily: Dialioideae
- Genus: Zenia; Chun
- Species: Z. insignis

Binomial name
- Zenia insignis Chun

= Zenia insignis =

Species of legume

Zenia is a genus of plants in the family Fabaceae. It belongs to the subfamily Dialioideae. It contains a single species, Zenia insignis.

The Fabaceae family is known for their extraordinary ability to be efficient in symbiotic nitrogen-fixation. The Papilionoidea and Caesalpinioideae subfamilies have been found to be the two sister families that Z. insignis seemed to diverge from, through the evidence of fossil calibration points. Based on genetic research, Z. insignis appears to have lost the genes relating to key-nodulation during its evolution. This results in the tree's inability to establish a relationship with Rhizobium (nitrogen-fixating bacteria), and limits it from partaking in the process of nitrogen-fixation.

Z. insignis is a medium-sized tree, 15–20 metres (49–66 ft) tall. It is found in southern China and northern Vietnam. It is threatened by habitat loss and overharvesting. This is due to the fact that the tree provides many economic benefits, like being a great resource for furniture, interior design, and construction industries. As a result, the species is under second-class national protection in China.
