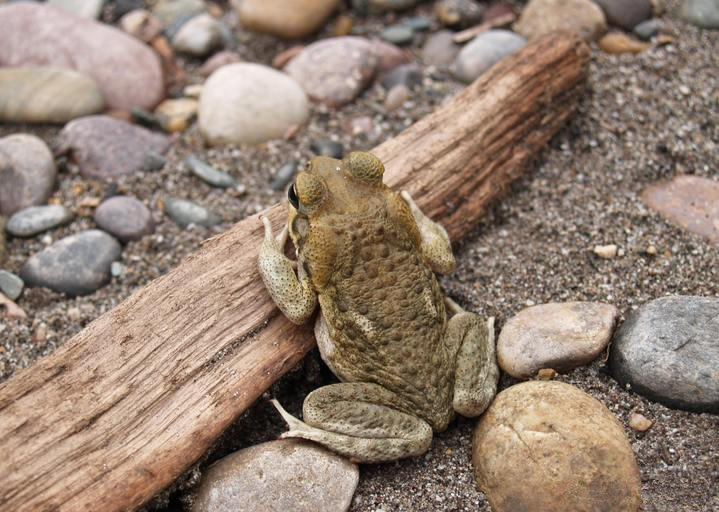

Conservation status
- Least Concern (IUCN 3.1)

Scientific classification
- Kingdom: Animalia
- Phylum: Chordata
- Class: Amphibia
- Order: Anura
- Family: Bufonidae
- Genus: Rhinella
- Species: R. poeppigii

Binomial name
- Rhinella poeppigii (Tschudi, 1845)

Synonyms
- Bufo poeppigii Tschudi, 1845

= Rhinella poeppigii =

Species of amphibian

Rhinella poeppigii (common names: gray toad, Poepiggi's toad) is a species of toad in the family Bufonidae that is known from the eastern Andean slopes of Ecuador, Peru, and Bolivia, as well as from Serranía de Sira in Amazonian Peru. Its distinctiveness from Rhinella marina has been debated, but it is currently accepted as a valid species. It is named after Eduard Friedrich Poeppig, German botanist and naturalist who made scientific expeditions to South America.

== Description ==
Rhinella poeppigii resembles Rhinella marina but is smaller. Males measure 81–111 mm (3.2–4.4 in) and females 122–128 mm (4.8–5.0 in) in snout–vent length. They are grayish brown in colour and with rough, tuberculate skin. Belly has lighter colour and lacks markings, or has pale markings only.

== Habitat and conservation ==
Natural habitats of Rhinella poeppigii are cloud forests on the Andean slopes, and tropical moist forest in the Amazonian foothills. It is typically found near streams and standing water. Its altitudinal range is 260–1,800 m (850–5,910 ft) asl.

There are no threats to this reasonably abundant species. It is also present in many protected areas.
