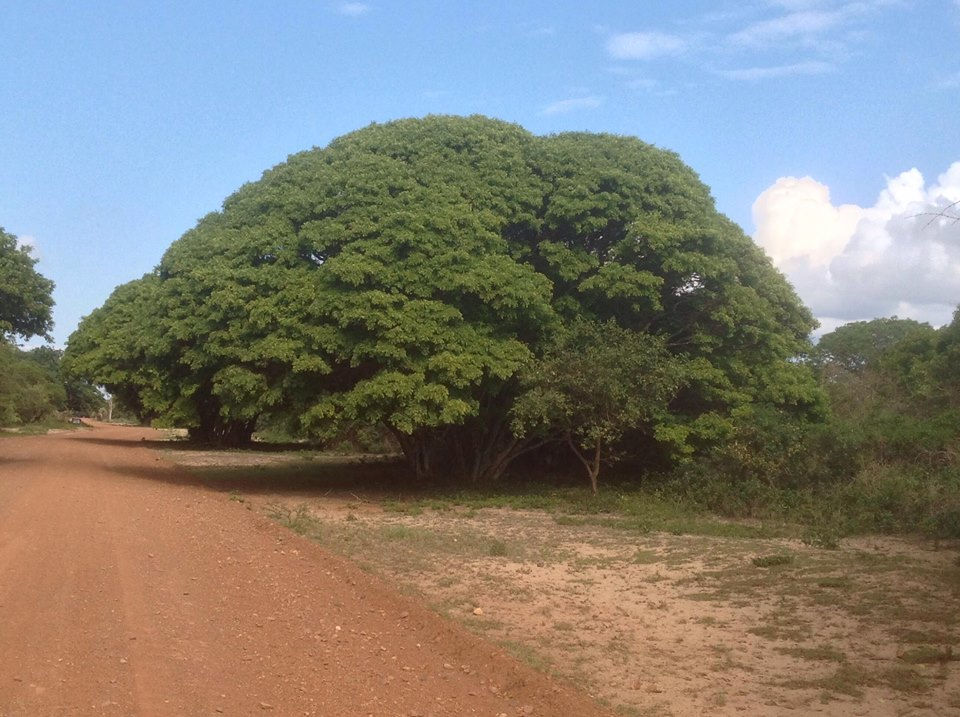
- Dialium schlechteri Harms

Scientific classification
- Kingdom: Plantae
- Clade: Tracheophytes
- Clade: Angiosperms
- Clade: Eudicots
- Clade: Rosids
- Order: Fabales
- Family: Fabaceae
- Subfamily: Dialioideae; Legume Phylogeny Working Group

Type genus
- Dialium L.

Genera
- See text

Synonyms
- Dialiinae H.S.Irwin & Barneby 1981; Dialiinae Clade; Labicheinae H.S.Irwin & Barneby 1981

= Dialioideae =

Subfamily of legumes

The subfamily Dialioideae is one of the subdivisions of the plant family Fabaceae (legumes). This subfamily includes many tropical trees and shrubs. The subfamily consists of 17 genera, which are widespread throughout the tropics. It has the following clade-based definition:

The most inclusive crown clade containing Poeppigia procera C.Presland Dialium guianense (Aubl.) Sandwith, but not Cercis canadensis L., Duparquetia orchidacea Baill., or Bobgunnia fistuloides (Harms) J. H. Kirkbr. & Wiersema

Members of the family also share the following morphological characteristics: the presence of cymose inflorescences, the absence of vestured pits in the xylem, and a high degree of organ loss.

== Taxonomy ==
Dialioideae comprises the following genera:

- Androcalymma Dwyer
- Apuleia Mart.
- Baudouinia Baill.
- Dialium L.
- Dicorynia Benth.
- Distemonanthus Benth.
- Eligmocarpus Capuron
- Kalappia Kosterm.
- Koompassia Maingay ex Benth.
- Labichea Gaudich. ex DC.
- Martiodendron Gleason
- Mendoravia Capuron
- Petalostylis R.Br.
- Poeppigia C.Presl
- Storckiella Seem
- Uittienia Steenis
- Zenia Chun

== Phylogenetics ==
Dialioideae exhibits the following phylogenetic relationships: (compare)

- Fabales
  - outgroup
  - Dialioideae
    - Poeppigia
    - - - Eligmocarpus
        - Baudouinia
      - - - Uittienia
          - Zenia
        - - - - Distemonanthus
              - Apuleia
            - - - Koompassia
                - Martiodendron
              - - Mendoravia
                - - Storckiella
                  - - Kalappia
                    - - Petalostylis
                      - Labichea
          - Dialium (including Dicorynia and Androcalymma)
