= Eduard Friedrich Poeppig =

German naturalist (1798–1868)

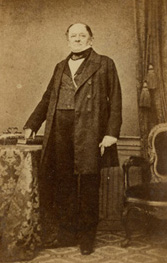
- Born: 16 July 1798; Plauen, Saxony
- Died: 4 September 1868 (aged 70)
- Education: University of Leipzig
- Known for
- Scientific career
- Fields: Botany, Zoology

Eduard Friedrich Poeppig (16 July 1798 – 4 September 1868) was a German botanist, zoologist and explorer.

== Biography ==
Poeppig was born in Plauen, Saxony. He studied medicine and natural history at the University of Leipzig, graduating with a medical degree. On graduation, the rector of the university gave him a botanical mission to North and South America. He was helped out financially by a small group of friends and scientists in Leipzig, that included botanist Christian Friedrich Schwägrichen, who in exchange, received sets of specimens. He subsequently worked as a naturalist in Cuba (1823–24) and Pennsylvania (1824–26). In 1826 he departed for Valparaíso, Chile, and spent several years performing scientific exploration throughout Chile, Peru and Brazil. As a result of his journey in South America, he published "Reise in Chile, Peru und auf dem Amazonenstrome, während der Jahre 1827-1832 " (2 volumes). Gustav Kunze supported these botanical voyages (1823-1828) and distributed plant material collected by Poeppig in several exsiccata-like series, among others [Pöppig] Plantae Pensylvaniae and Pöppig Coll. Pl. Chil. I.

In the autumn of 1832, he returned to Germany with significant zoological and botanical collections — several hundred stuffed animals, a collection of ethnographic objects, and more than 17,000 dried plants. During the following year, he became an associate professor at the University of Leipzig, where in 1834 he was named director of its zoological museum. In 1846 he attained a full professorship at Leipzig, a position he maintained until his death in 1868. He contributed to the establishment of a scientific museum in Leipzig, and bequeathed to it some of his collections, with the remainder being sent to museums in Berlin and Vienna.

In South America he described numerous new species of plants. His botanical magnum opus, Nova genera ac Species Plantarum quas in regno, Chiliensi, Peruviano, ac Terra Amazonica, anni 1827-1832 lectarum, was published in three volumes. In it he described 31 new genera, and 477 new species. For the first two volumes he collaborated with Stephan Endlicher.

== Eponymy ==
The plant genus Poeppigia is named after him, as are taxa with the specific epithets of poeppigi, poeppigii, and poeppigiana, a few examples being: the silvery woolly monkey (Lagothrix poeppigii ), the snake Atractus poeppigi, the toad Rhinella poeppigii, the orchid Campylocentrum poeppigii (Rchb. f.) Rolfe, and the angiosperm species Guatteria poeppigiana Mart..

== Written works ==
- Fragmentum synopseos plantarum phanerogamarum, (1833). (in Latin).
- Selbstanzeige der Reisebeschreibung in Blätter für literarische Unterhaltung, (1835). (in German).
- Reise in Chile, Peru und auf dem Amazonenstrome während der Jahre 1827–1832 (Travel in Chile, Peru, and on the Amazon river during the years 1827–1832), 2 volumes (1834-36). (in German).
- Nova genera ac species plantarum, quas in regno Chilensi Peruviano et in terra Amazonica: annis MDCCCXXVII ad MDCCCXXXII (with Stephan Ladislaus Endlicher), (1835–45). (in Latin).
- Reise nach den Vereinigten Staaten (Travel to the United States), (1837). (in German).
- Über alte und neue Handelswege nach der Westküste Amerikas (On old and new trade routes to the west coast of the Americas), (1838). (in German).
- Landschaftliche Ansichten und erlauternde Darstellungen (Views of countryside with explanation), (1839). (in German).

Poeppig was a primary contributor of ethnological, geographical, and biological articles about the Americas for the Allgemeine Encyclopaedie, edited by Ersch and Gruber.

== See also ==
- Category:Taxa named by Eduard Friedrich Poeppig
