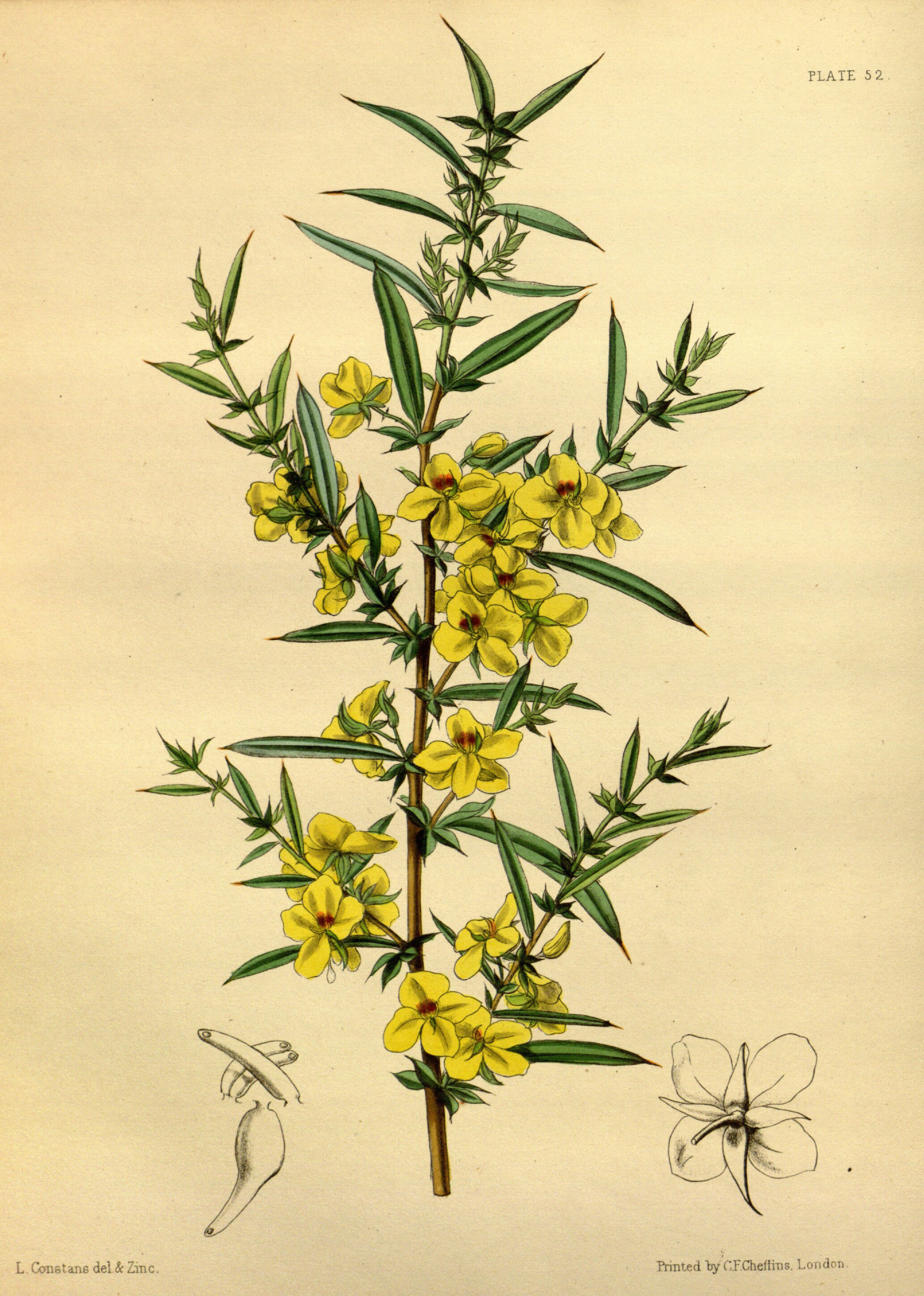
- Labichea lanceolata Benth.
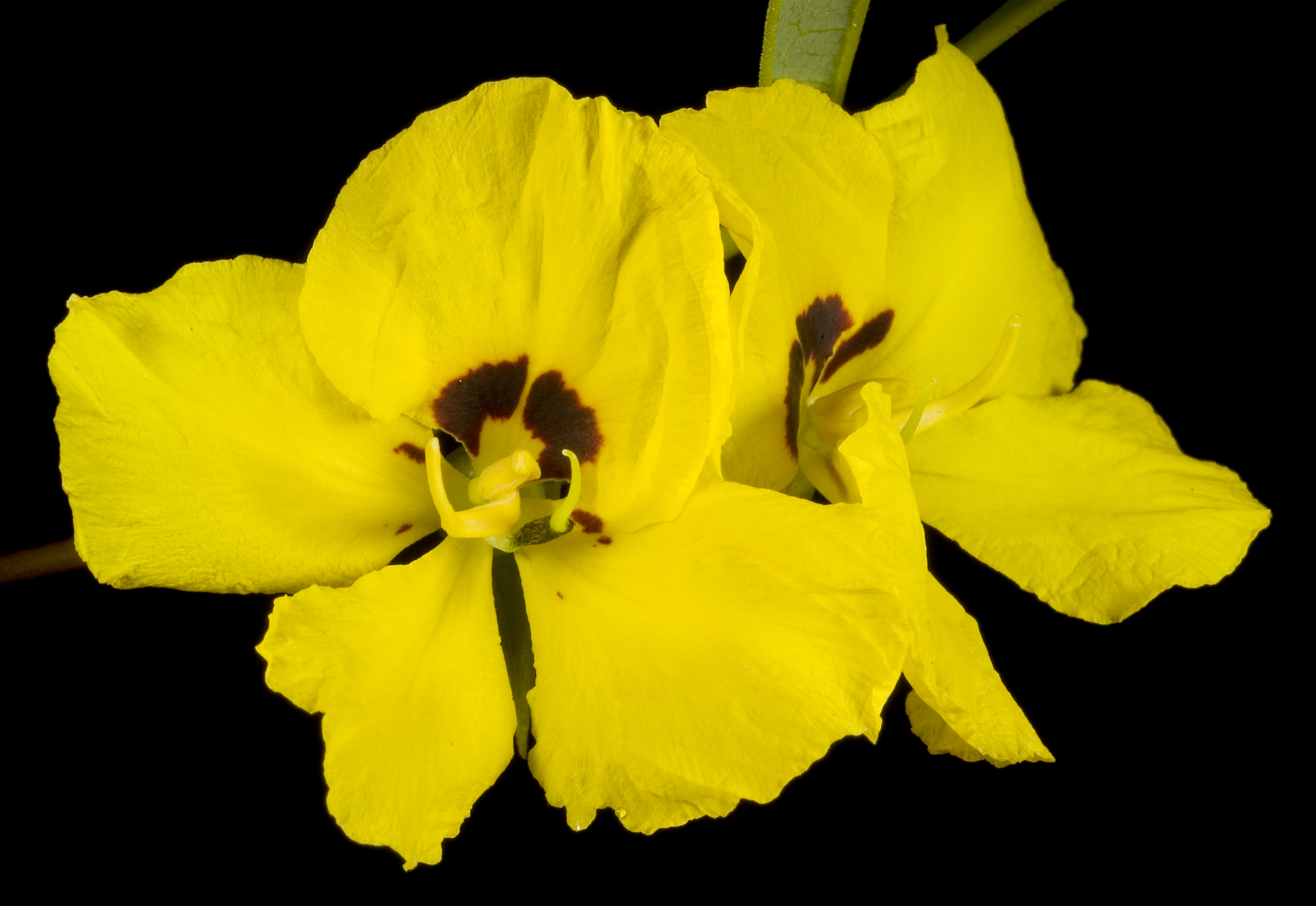
- Labichea lanceolata

Scientific classification
- Kingdom: Plantae
- Clade: Tracheophytes
- Clade: Angiosperms
- Clade: Eudicots
- Clade: Rosids
- Order: Fabales
- Family: Fabaceae
- Subfamily: Dialioideae
- Genus: Labichea; Gaudich. ex DC. (1825)

Species
- 16; see text

= Labichea =

Genus of legumes

Labichea is a genus of flowering plants in the family Fabaceae. It includes 16 species of shrubs native to northern Australia – Queensland, the Northern Territory, and Western Australia. Typical habitats are tropical and seasonally-dry, and include rocky sandstone ravines, coastal sand dunes, desert, and semi-arid woodland and dry scrub, generally on granite or sandstone substrates. It belongs to the subfamily Dialioideae.

The genus consists of the following species:

- Labichea brassii C.T.White & W.D.Francis
- Labichea buettneriana F.Muell.
- Labichea cassioides DC.
- Labichea deserticola J.H.Ross
- Labichea digitata Benth.
- Labichea eremaea C.A.Gardner
- Labichea lanceolata Benth.
- Labichea mulliganensis A.R.Bean
- Labichea nitida Benth.
- Labichea obtrullata J.H.Ross
- Labichea punctata Lindl.
- Labichea rossii N.Gibson
- Labichea rupestris Benth.
- Labichea saxicola J.H.Ross
- Labichea stellata J.H.Ross
- Labichea teretifolia C.A.Gardner
