= Poeppigia =

Scientific classification
- Kingdom: Plantae
- Clade: Tracheophytes
- Clade: Angiosperms
- Clade: Eudicots
- Clade: Rosids
- Order: Fabales
- Family: Fabaceae
- Subfamily: Dialioideae
- Genus: Poeppigia; C.Presl (1831)

Species
- Poeppigia densiflora Tul.; Poeppigia procera (Poepp. ex Spreng.) C.Presl

Synonyms
- Ramirezia A.Rich. (1846)

Genus of legumes

Poeppigia is a genus of flowering plants in the family Fabaceae. It includes two species of trees native to the tropical Americas, ranging from southern Mexico to Bolivia and southeastern Brazil, including Cuba. They grow in forest and woodland, savanna, and shrubland. It belongs to the subfamily Dialioideae.
