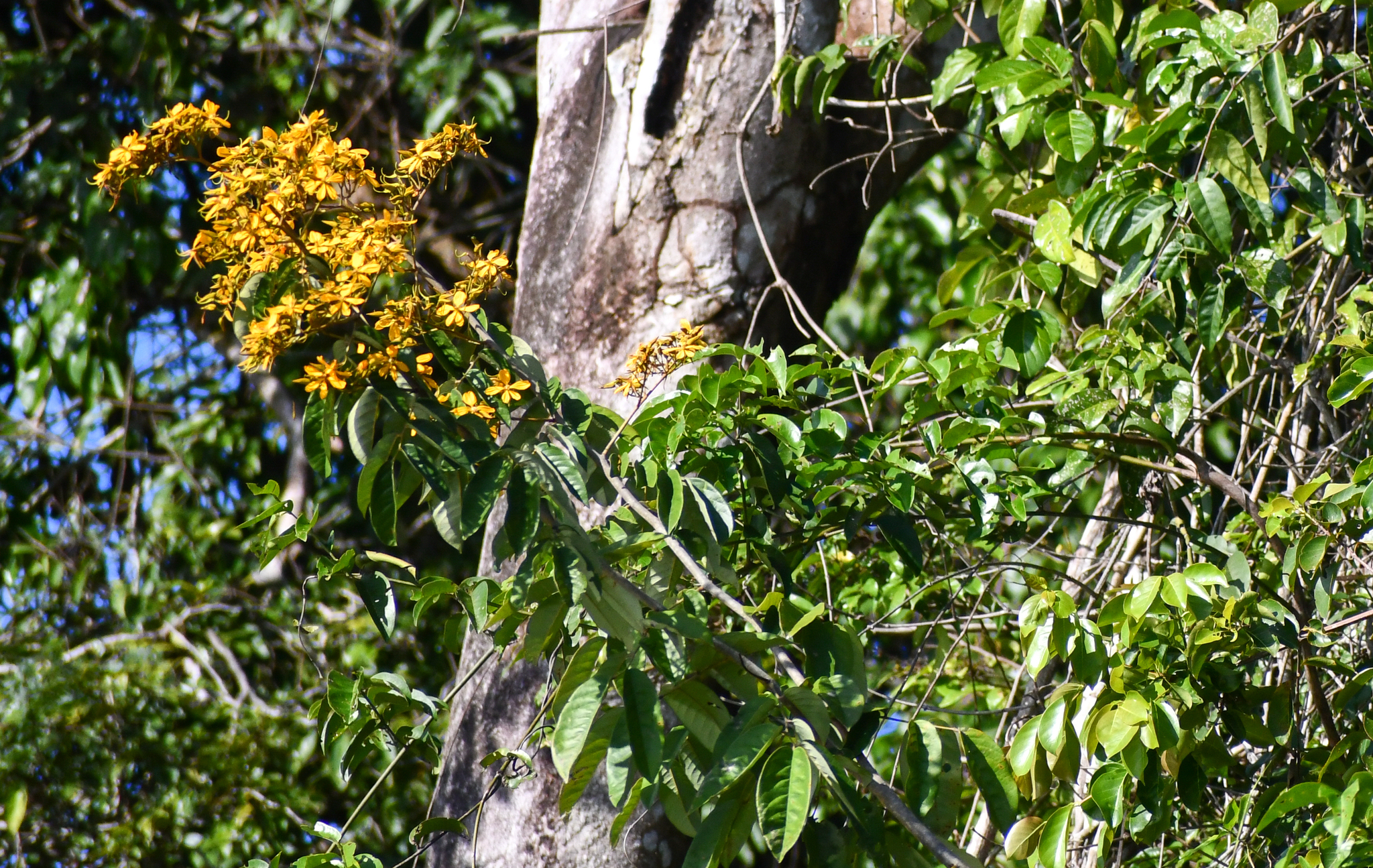
- Martiodendron excelsum in Brazil

Scientific classification
- Kingdom: Plantae
- Clade: Embryophytes
- Clade: Tracheophytes
- Clade: Spermatophytes
- Clade: Angiosperms
- Clade: Eudicots
- Clade: Rosids
- Order: Fabales
- Family: Fabaceae
- Subfamily: Dialioideae
- Genus: Martiodendron; Gleason

Species
- Martiodendron elatum (Ducke) Gleason; Martiodendron excelsum (Benth.) Gleason; Martiodendron fluminense Lombardi; Martiodendron mediterraneum (Mart. ex Benth.) Köppen; Martiodendron parviflorum (Amshoff) Köppen

Synonyms
- Martia Benth., orth. var.; Martiusia Benth., nom. illeg.

= Martiodendron =

Genus of legumes

Martiodendron is a genus of flowering plants in the family Fabaceae. It includes five species of trees native to northern South America, from southern Venezuela, the Guianas, and Peru to Bolivia and southeastern Brazil. Typical habitats include tropical rain forest, often periodically inundated, in both the Amazon and Atlantic forests, as well as seasonally-dry forest and wooded grassland (savanna), up to 600 meters elevation. The genus belongs to the subfamily Dialioideae.
