= Alexander Carroll Maingay =

- Born: 1836; Great Ayton, Yorkshire
- Died: 1869 (aged 32–33); Rangoon, Myanmar
- Education: University of Edinburgh
- Scientific career
- Thesis: Monograph on the British parmeliaceae (1858)

Alexander Carroll Maingay (1836 - 1869) was a British physician, botanist and botanical collector.

== Education ==
Alexander Carroll Maingay was born in Great Ayton, Yorkshire and studied medicine at the University of Edinburgh from 1854-1858, obtaining a gold medal for his thesis entitled 'Monograph on the British parmeliaceae'. During his medical studies he also assisted in re-arranging the large collection of Algae in the University Herbarium.

== Career ==
On leaving the University, he became a Surgeon in the British Indian Medical Service in Bengal in 1859, transferring to China in 1860 and then became magistrate of the prison in Malacca, now part of modern day Malaysia, from 1862 and in 1868 became the superintendent of Rangoon Central Prison in Myanmar (Burma).

While stationed in the Far East he collected plants in various localities including North China, Malacca, Penang and Singapore. After his death his botanical collections were acquired for Kew Gardens, including many plants then new to science. Maingay is commemorated in several plant names, such as Artocarpus maingayi King and Maingaya malayana Oliv.

The standard author abbreviation Maingay is used to indicate this person as the author when citing a botanical name.

== Death ==
It was while superintendent of Rangoon Central Prison that he was killed during a riot by inmates in November 1869.
