= Omnicane =

Sugarcane company in Port Louis, Mauritius

- Industry: Sugar Cane
- Founded: 15 September 1926
- Headquarters: Port Louis, Mauritius
- Key people: Jacques Marrier d'Unienville
- Products: Sugar, Bioethanol, Thermal Energy, Electricity
- Number of employees: 1472
- Website: www.omnicane.com

Omnicane Limited, incorporated in 1926, is a public company on the Official List of the Stock Exchange of Mauritius. It is a modern sugarcane company that has evolved from Mauritius's centuries-old sugar industry (List of sugar mills in Mauritius). Omnicane's primary activity within the Sugar industry of Mauritius is the cultivation of sugarcane and the downstream production of refined sugar, bioethanol, thermal energy, and electricity.

== Sugarcane Cultivation ==
Omnicane Agriculture owns and manages some 3,000 hectares of land under cultivation. Around 2,800 hectares are harvested annually and yield circa 225,000 tonnes of sugarcane. In sugar cane agriculture, there are two distinct periods: the crop and the intercrop season which are from June to December and from January to June, respectively. The intercrop season is when most of the replantation and field maintenance is carried out whilst the crop season involves the harvesting and then crushing of cane by Omnicane Milling Operations.
