= Reginald Edward Vaughan =

R E Vaughan British botanist

Reginald Edward Vaughan OBE FRIC (27 October 1895 – 29 April 1987) was a British botanist who lived and worked in Mauritius from 1923.

== Biography ==
Vaughan was born in Wooburn, Buckinghamshire, 27 October 1895, the son of Herbert and Jane Vaughan, who lived at Dell House, Wooburn. He went to Imperial College where he was awarded a second class degree in chemistry in 1920. In 1916, at the age of 20, he enlisted in the Royal Engineers as a Pioneer and served until he was discharged, September 1918, when he was appointed Temporary Second Lieutenant in the Royal Garrison Artillery.

He first worked at Harper Adams College but in 1923 he moved to Mauritius where he worked as a chemistry teacher at the Royal College Curepipe. His interest in botany developed and from 1934 he collaborated with Paul Octave Wiehe on botanical exploration and conservative, seeing the creation of 16 nature reserves between 1951 and 1974, and in 1959 the creation of the Mauritius Herbarium. The herbarium collection moved from Pamplemousses to Réduit, within the Mauritius Sugar Industry Research Institute (MSIRI) which he had created, with Wiehe, in 1946. He was director of the Mauritius Institute from 1946 to 1960. He was the curator of the Herbarium from 1960 until 1969, when he retired. Together with Joseph Guého, his assistant, he added to the collections in the herbarium. He continued to work on the flora and helped initiate the Flore des Mascareignes project.

During World War II from 1943 he worked as the chief censor for the Bureau of Information.

He was elected a fellow of the Linnean Society on 8 December 1932, obtained his Ph.D. in 1934 from the University of London and later a D.Sc. He was awarded an O.B.E. in the 1950 Birthday Honours "For public services in Mauritius." He was President of the Societe Royale des Arts et des Sciences de l'ile Maurice 1957–1959.

In 1921 he married Gwendolin Kerby (1897–1938) in Amersham. They had a daughter Phyllis, born 1923 in Maidenhead. His second wife, Elsie, died in 1973. He is recorded returning to England in 1932, 1936, and 1940, accompanied by Phyllis, on his own in 1944, and then with Elsie in 1949.

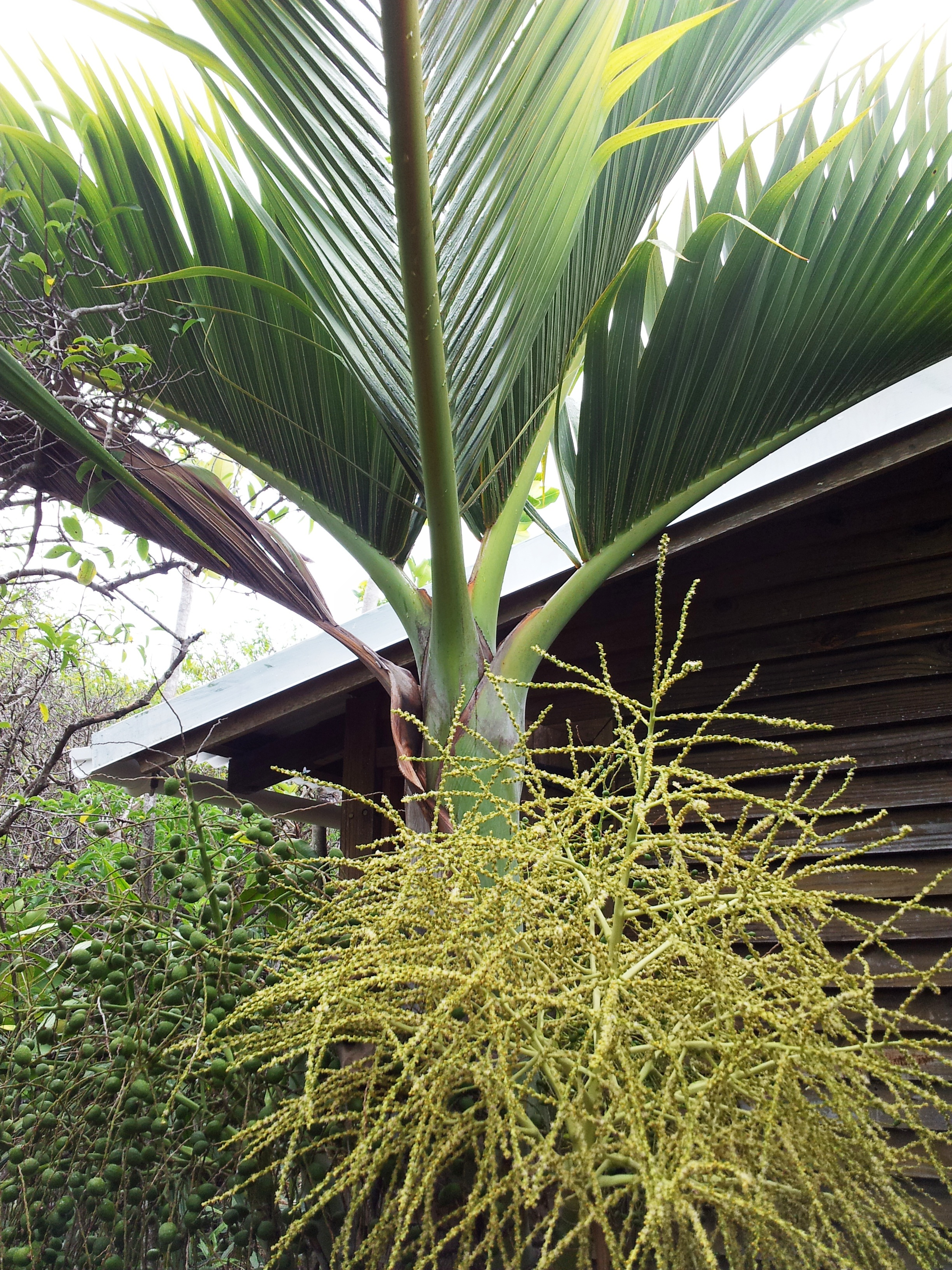
Hyophorbe vaughanii

He died in Mauritius on 29 April 1987.

Albizia vaughanii Brenan, Eugenia vaughanii J.Guého & A.J.Scott, Syzygium vaughanii J.Guého & A.J.Scott, Croton vaughanii Croizat, Hyophorbe vaughanii L.H.Bailey, Myonima vaughanii Verdc., are some of the species named in his honour.

The RE Vaughan Building, MSIRI Compound, Reduit, Mauritius is named after him.

== Selected publications ==
Studies on the Vegetation of Mauritius: I. A Preliminary Survey of the Plant Communities. R. E. Vaughan, P. O. Wiehe 1937. Journal of Ecology, 25(2):289–343

The grasses of Mauritius and Rodriguez. C.E. Hubbard, R.E. Vaughan. (1940). Ed. Waterlow.

Nature reserves in Mauritius, Reginald Edward Vaughan 1957, Tananarive

Conservation of vegetation in Africa south of the Sahara: Mauritius & Rodriguez. Vaughan, R. E. Acta Phytogeogr. Suec., 54, 1968. pp. 265–72.

Annotated bibliography of Mascarene plant life: including the useful and ornamental plants of the region, covering the period 1609–1990. David H. Lorence, R.E. Vaughan. (1992). National Tropical Botanical Garden. 274 pp. ISBN 091580915X
