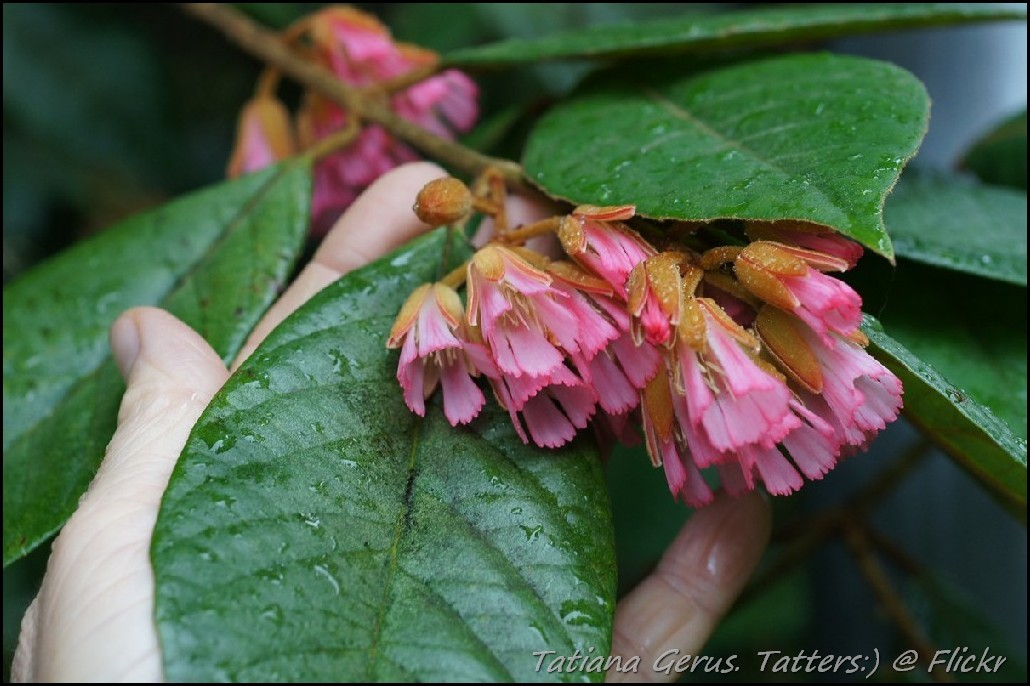
- Aceratium ferrugineum flowering; cultivated plant at Roma Street Parkland, Brisbane.
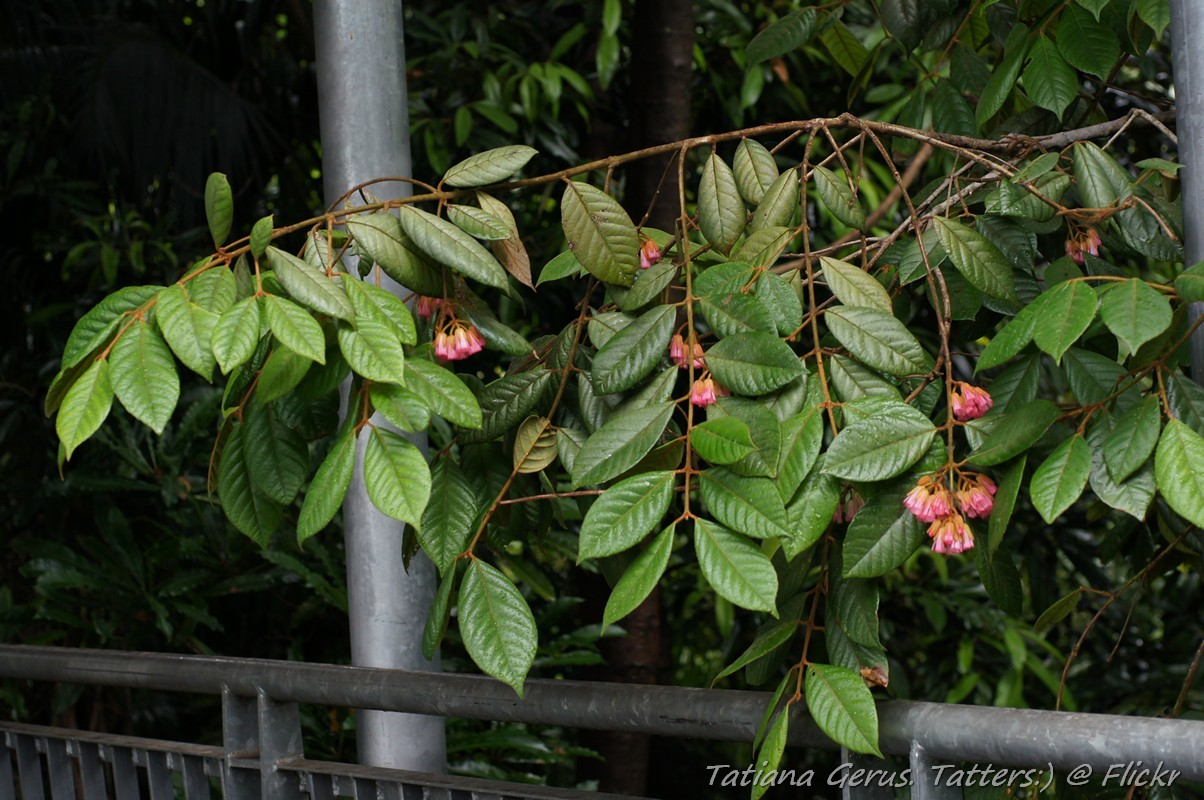

Scientific classification
- Kingdom: Plantae
- Clade: Embryophytes
- Clade: Tracheophytes
- Clade: Spermatophytes
- Clade: Angiosperms
- Clade: Eudicots
- Clade: Rosids
- Order: Oxalidales
- Family: Elaeocarpaceae
- Genus: Aceratium; DC.

Type species
- Aceratium oppositifolium DC.

= Aceratium =

Genus of flowering plants

Aceratium is a genus of about 20 species of plants from the family Elaeocarpaceae native to eastern Malesia, Papuasia and Queensland. They are commonly known as carabeens.

== Description ==
Plants in this genus are shrubs or small trees (some are large trees) with opposite leaves. Stipules are either absent or minute, and petioles are short. Inflorescences are racemose or somewhat umbellate. The flowers are bisexual, have distinct petals and sepals, and are usually pentamerous. The fruits are drupes.

== Distribution ==
One species occurs from Maluku through New Guinea to Vanuatu, one is endemic to the Philippines, five are endemic to Queensland, and the balance occur throughout New Guinea and the Bismarck Archipelago.

== Species ==
As of July 2026, the following 20 species are accepted by Plants of the World Online.

- Aceratium archboldianum A.C.Sm. – New Guinea
- Aceratium brassii A.C.Sm. – New Guinea
- Aceratium calomala Blanco – Philippines
- Aceratium concinnum (S.Moore) C.T.White – Queensland
- Aceratium dasyphyllum A.C.Sm. – Maluku (Kai Islands)
- Aceratium doggrellii C.T.White – Queensland
- Aceratium ferrugineum C.T.White – Queensland
- Aceratium hypoleucum Kaneh. & Hatus. – New Guinea
- Aceratium ledermannii Schltr. – New Guinea, Bismarck Archipelago
- Aceratium megalospermum (F.Muell.) Balgooy – Queensland
- Aceratium muellerianum Schltr. – New Guinea
- Aceratium oppositifolium DC. – Maluku Islands through New Guinea to Vanuatu
- Aceratium pachypetalum Schltr. – north west New Guinea
- Aceratium parvifolium Schltr. – New Guinea
- Aceratium pittosporoides Schltr. – New Guinea
- Aceratium sericeum A.C.Sm. – New Guinea
- Aceratium sericoleopsis Balgooy – Queensland
- Aceratium sinuatum Coode – Papua New Guinea
- Aceratium sphaerocarpum Kaneh. & Hatus. – New Guinea
- Aceratium tomentosum Coode – north east New Guinea

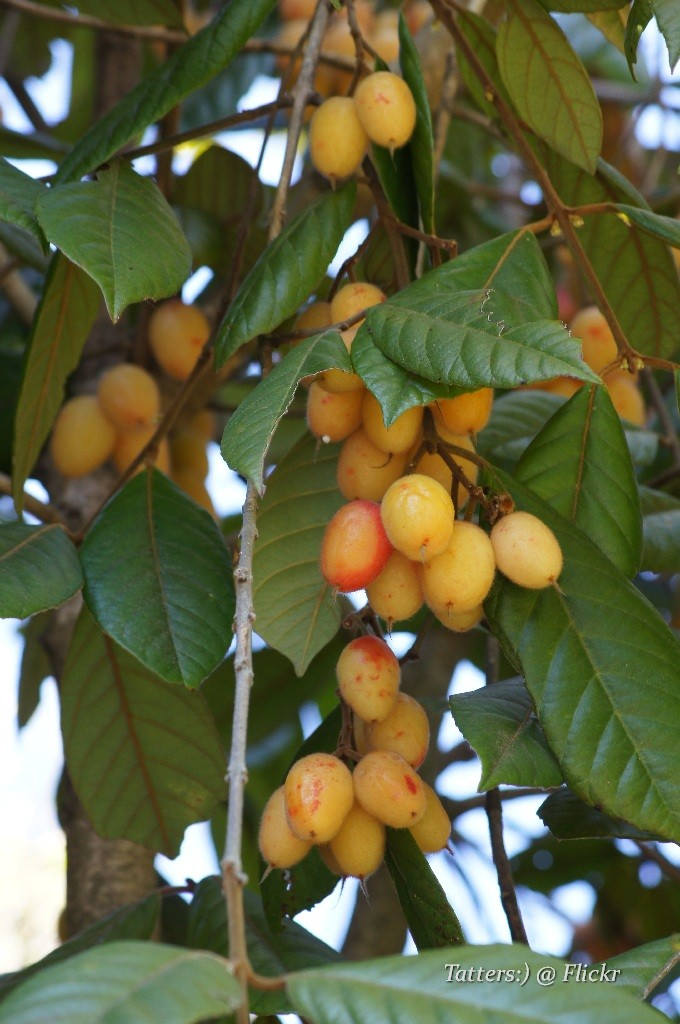
A. ferrugineum fruiting; cultivated plant at Roma Street Parkland, Brisbane, 11 Dec 2011.
