= Climate change in Mauritius =

Emissions, impacts and responses of Mauritius related to climate change

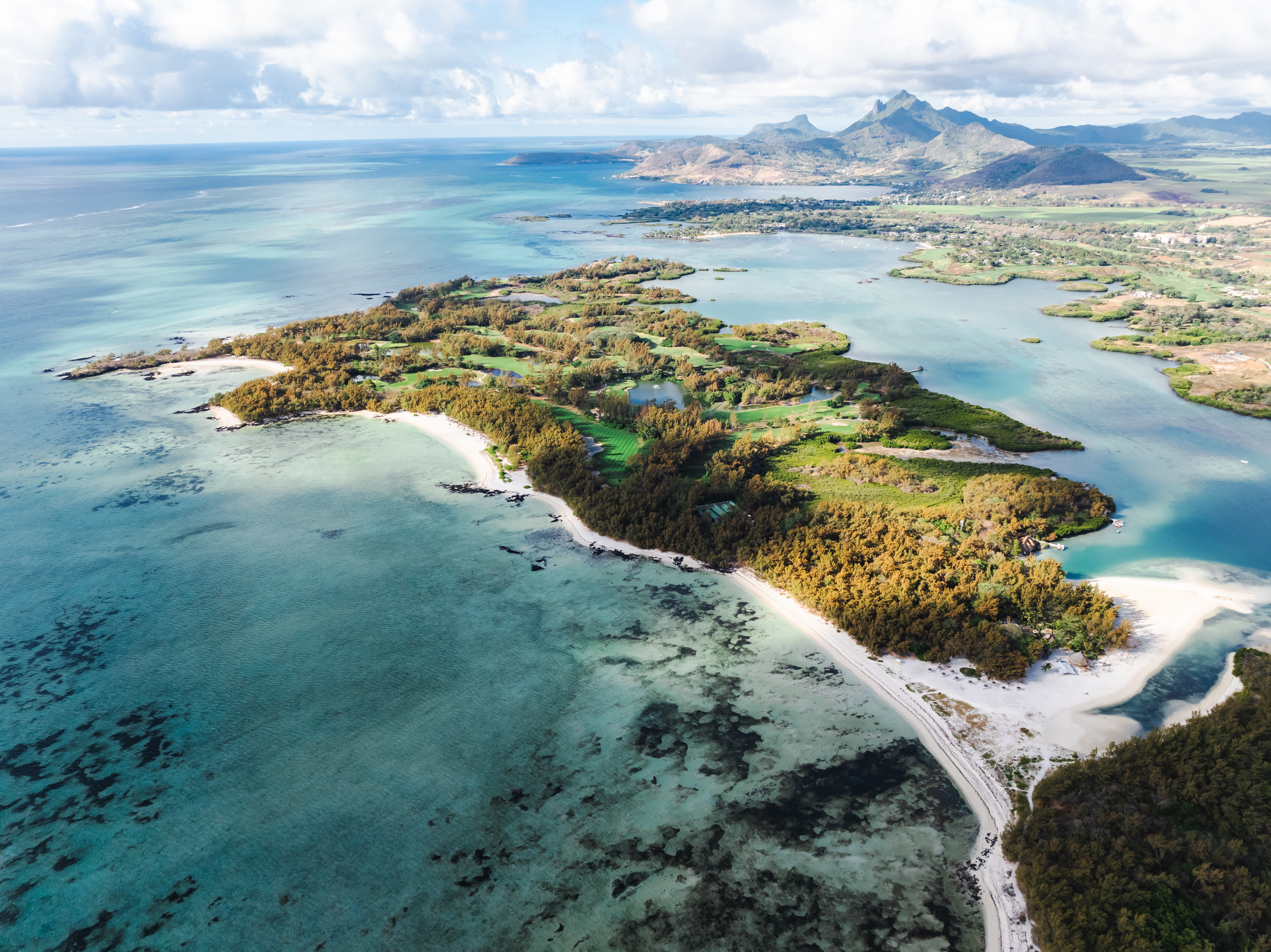
Mauritius

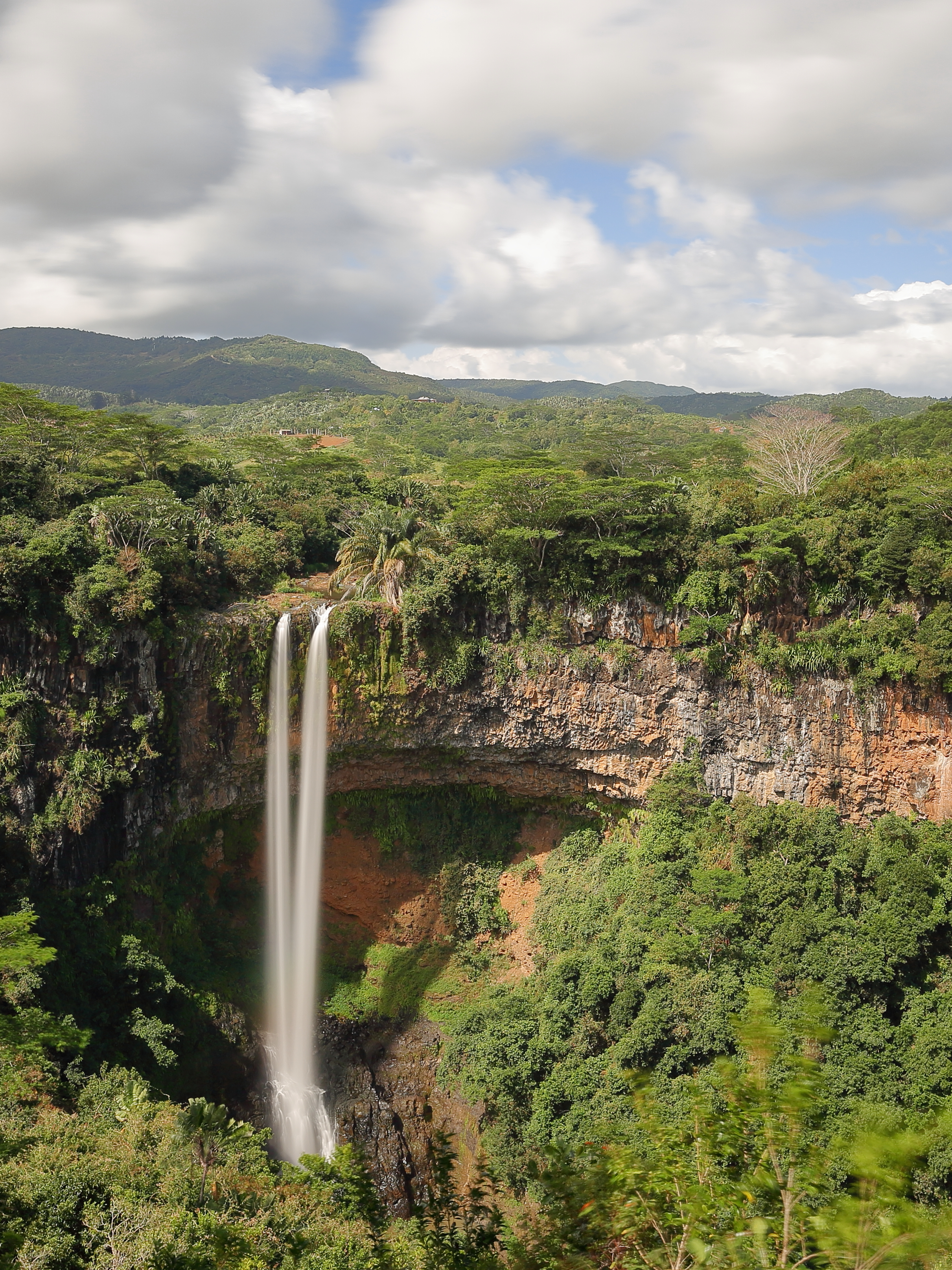
Chamarel Falls Mauritius

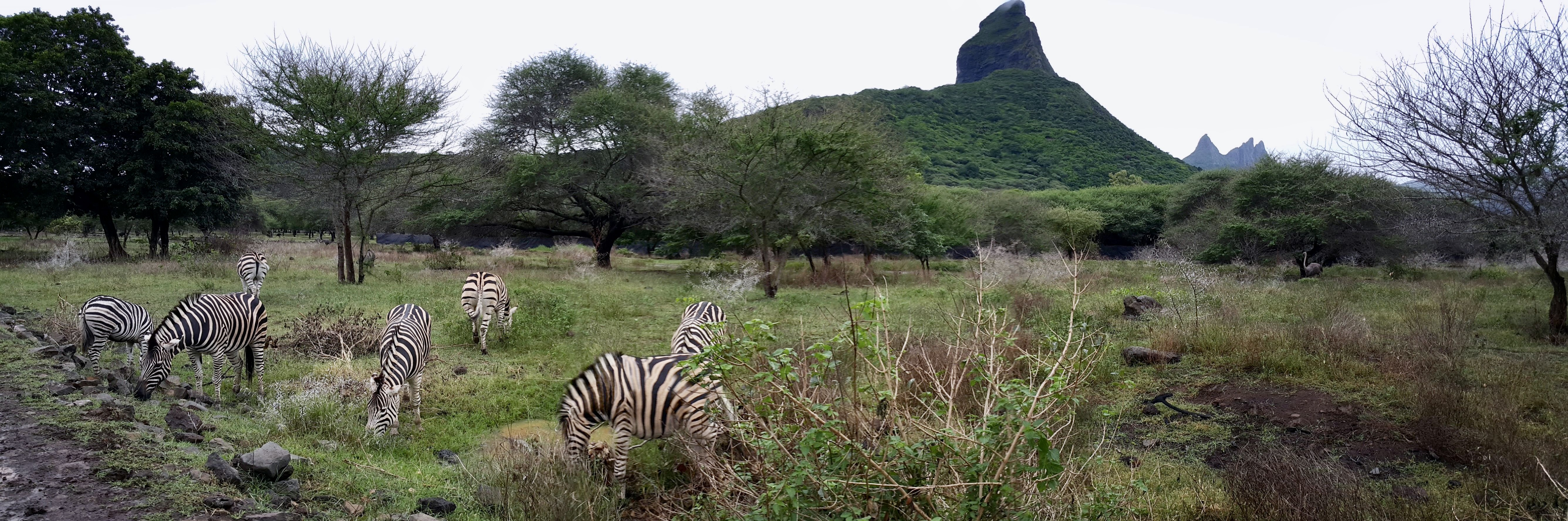
Zebras in Casela Nature Parks, Mauritius

Mauritius, an island nation in the Indian Ocean, faces numerous threats stemming from climate change. These challenges include rising sea levels, increasing frequency and severity of natural disasters, as well as deterioration of life-sustaining ecosystems. These challenges are endangering the nation's coastal regions, affecting infrastructure and freshwater, and contributing to increasing temperatures and unpredictable climatic conditions. Mauritius has introduced adaption measures to improve resilience to a changing climate, including the National Climate Change Adaptation Strategy.

== Greenhouse gas emissions ==
In 2022, Mauritius accounted for 0.01% of global emissions, producing 4.02 million tonnes of $\ce{CO2}$ from fuel combustion, a 65% increase from 2000 levels. In the same year, per capita $\ce{CO2}$ emissions were 3.184 t$\ce{CO2}$ / Capita, which was approximately a 55% increase from 2000.

In 2024, Mauritius emitted about 5.310 million tonnes of greenhouse gases, an increase of 1.6% from 2023. Per capita emissions also rose to 3.68 tonnes of $\ce{CO2}$equivalent.

The government has committed to reducing emissions by 40% by the year 2030 and has taken several steps, such as higher usage of renewable energy and better waste management.

Fossil Carbon Dioxide (CO₂) emissions of Mauritius
Year	Fossil CO₂ emissions (tonnes)	CO₂ emissions change	CO₂ emissions per capita	Population	Pop. change	Share of World's CO₂ emissions
2022	4,281,810	6.05%	3.36	1,276,130	−0.27%	0.011%
2021	4,037,410	7.45%	3.16	1,279,623	−0.28%	0.011%
2020	3,757,420	−10.79%	2.93	1,283,223	−0.24%	0.010%
2019	4,211,940	0.82%	3.27	1,286,270	−0.2%	0.011%
2018	4,177,890	−0.88%	3.24	1,288,833	−0.14%	0.011%
2017	4,215,160	3.42%	3.27	1,290,655	−0.09%	0.011%
2016	4,075,650	1.86%	3.16	1,291,803	−0.04%	0.011%
2015	4,001,150	0.31%	3.1	1,292,275	0.02%	0.011%
2014	3,988,920	3.36%	3.09	1,292,005	0.08%	0.011%
2013	3,859,280	3.11%	2.99	1,290,984	0.14%	0.011%
2012	3,742,760	2.39%	2.9	1,289,170	0.23%	0.011%
2011	3,655,560	−0.52%	2.84	1,286,267	0.28%	0.010%
2010	3,674,690	6.91%	2.86	1,282,709	0.29%	0.011%
2009	3,437,220	−1.43%	2.69	1,278,972	0.34%	0.011%
2008	3,486,930	2.15%	2.74	1,274,635	0.4%	0.011%
2007	3,413,400	2.77%	2.69	1,269,518	0.45%	0.011%
2006	3,321,310	11.52%	2.63	1,263,781	0.52%	0.011%
2005	2,978,330	6.98%	2.37	1,257,215	0.59%	0.0100%
2004	2,784,050	0.85%	2.23	1,249,800	0.62%	0.0097%
2003	2,760,520	4.71%	2.22	1,242,099	0.65%	0.010%
2002	2,636,390	2.07%	2.14	1,234,085	0.68%	0.010%
2001	2,582,810	5.74%	2.11	1,225,801	0.75%	0.0100%
2000	2,442,550	10.6%	2.01	1,216,629	0.89%	0.0095%
1999	2,208,420	22.57%	1.83	1,205,891	0.9%	0.0089%
1998	1,801,750	9.69%	1.51	1,195,105	0.91%	0.0073%
1997	1,642,570	0.42%	1.39	1,184,299	1.02%	0.0067%
1996	1,635,700	4.76%	1.4	1,172,383	1.08%	0.0068%
1995	1,561,370	2.38%	1.35	1,159,821	1.16%	0.0066%
1994	1,525,020	3.04%	1.33	1,146,548	1.25%	0.0067%
1993	1,479,960	10.26%	1.31	1,132,393	1.32%	0.0065%
1992	1,342,280	5.65%	1.2	1,117,670	1.33%	0.0059%
1991	1,270,520	7.12%	1.15	1,103,041	1.29%	0.0056%
1990	1,186,080	14.12%	1.09	1,089,024	1.21%	0.0053%
1989	1,039,370	12.74%	0.97	1,075,982	1.16%	0.0047%
1988	921,940	10.74%	0.87	1,063,593	1.19%	0.0042%
1987	832,510	5.75%	0.79	1,051,111	1.23%	0.0039%
1986	787,240	23.89%	0.76	1,038,344	1.3%	0.0038%
1985	635,440	−6.1%	0.62	1,025,063	1.37%	0.0031%
1984	676,740	7.46%	0.67	1,011,238	1.39%	0.0034%
1983	629,760	13.76%	0.63	997,366	1.4%	0.0033%
1982	553,610	−7.92%	0.56	983,610	1.48%	0.0029%
1981	601,240	3.37%	0.62	969,218	1.57%	0.0031%
1980	581,630	−6.65%	0.61	954,216	1.58%	0.0029%
1979	623,090	0.67%	0.66	939,387	1.52%	0.0031%
1978	618,960	4.73%	0.67	925,277	1.44%	0.0032%
1977	591,010	16.06%	0.65	912,147	1.37%	0.0031%

Data: Global Carbon Atlas and national reports [Worldometer]

== Impact on the natural environment ==
=== Temperature and weather ===
Climate change is affecting Mauritius in the form of higher temperatures, more frequent heat waves, and a reduction in total annual rainfall, which have lengthened the dry season and increased the risk of flash floods. Mauritius has also seen increased intensity of tropical cyclones and a rising sea level, contributing to coastal erosion and threatening infrastructure.

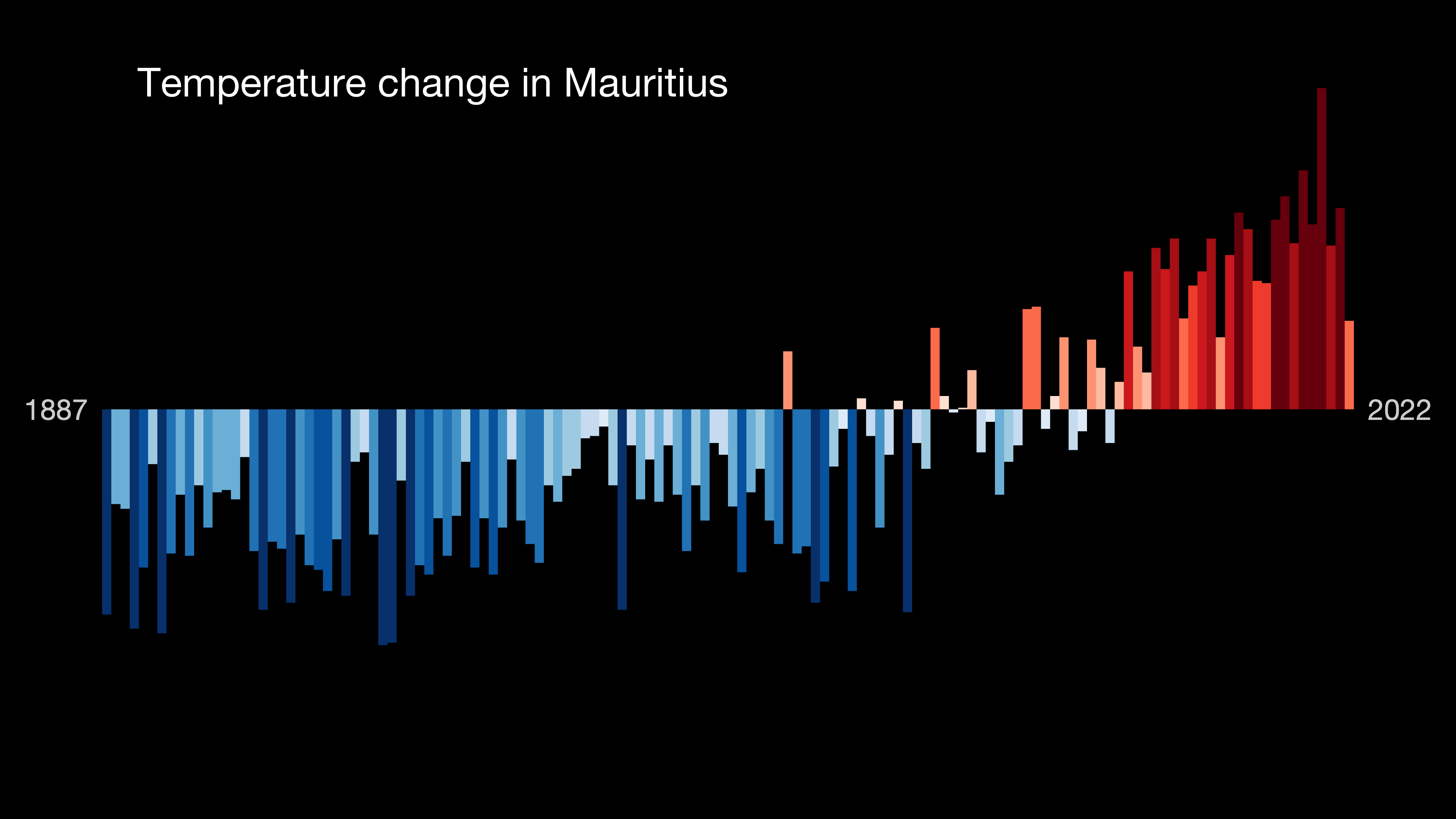
Warming stripes for Maritius, showing change in temperature over time.

Mauritius warmed by 0.0216 °C/year over the 1971–2020 period, and rainfall rose on average by 2.29 mm/year over the 1981–2020 period. Climate change has had significant impacts on the indigenous ecosystem of the island and poses risks to the long-term water supply system.

=== Impact on water resources ===
Climate change has affected Mauritius's water resources through increasingly unpredictable rainfall, more frequent droughts, and more severe heavy rainfall events. This translates into varied reservoir levels, stressed freshwater supplies, and intensified flooding, all of which can contaminate the surface and groundwater resources and compromise water security. Research shows that rainfall in Mauritius's decreased over the 1931–2020 period, affecting agriculture, livelihoods, industries, and businesses.

=== Ecosystems ===
Mauritian ecosystems have been affected by increased sea levels, more intense cyclones, and increased ocean temperatures, which contribute to coral bleaching, coastal erosion, and pose dangers to marine life and coastal towns. The effects ravage key habitats such as coral reefs and mangroves, disrupt fisheries, and jeopardise the tourism economy, which depends on a healthy, uninterrupted coastal ecosystem.

== Impact on people ==
Mauritius faces significant economic risks from climate change, because its economy depends heavily on climate-sensitive sectors such as tourism, fisheries, agriculture, and coastal infrastructure.

=== Tourism ===
Tourism contributes approximately 20% to Mauritius's GDP and is the employer of approximately 22% of the workforce. Sea level rise, coastal erosion, coral bleaching, increased storm intensity, and beach deterioration decreases the attractiveness of Mauritius as a destination. A projection estimates beach erosion will cause the Mauritian economy to lose up to US$50 million in revenue by 2050.

=== Fisheries and marine resources ===
Fisheries in Mauritius are threatened by ocean warming, shifting ranges of species, loss of coral reef habitats, and pressure from invasive species. Changes or declines in fish populations could impact exports as well as the livelihoods of coastal residents.

=== Agriculture ===
Shifting rain patterns, increasing pressure from drought, more intense and frequent storms, and soil erosion all lower crop yield and livestock production. In particular, the traditionally significant sugar industry is highly vulnerable to weather extremes like cyclones and floods.

=== Health ===
Climate change poses documented health risks in Mauritius. National and international assessments identify rising temperatures, heavier rainfall, rising sea levels, and stronger cyclones, which affect disease transmission, injuries, and health system performance.

==== Vector-borne diseases ====
Warmer temperatures and altered rainfall expand suitable habitats for Aedes mosquitoes and can accelerate viral replication. Mauritius has a history of chikungunya and dengue outbreaks, and the current global resurgence of chikungunya includes the southwest Indian Ocean region. Public health agencies link part of this risk to climate change.

==== Heat stress ====
Higher maximum temperatures raise risks of heat illness, especially for older adults, outdoor workers, and people with chronic diseases. Climate models used by the World Bank show increasing heat risk across the islands.

==== Water- and food-borne diseases ====
Intense rainfall and flooding compromise water quality and sanitation and can increase gastroenteritis and other enteric infections. Coastal flooding may also affect shellfish safety. The WHO country profile cites these pathways for small island states, including Mauritius.

== Mitigation and adaptation ==
Mauritius has a climate framework law, the Climate Change Act 2020, which establishes an Inter-Ministerial Council on Climate Change and a Department of Climate Change to guide policy towards a low-emissions, climate-resilient economy.

In September 2025 the government filed its third Nationally Determined Contribution. It targets a 40% reduction in economy-wide greenhouse gas emissions by 2035 compared to a business-as-usual pathway, with sectoral measures in energy, transport, waste, AFOLU, and IPPU.

The updated NDC framework also raises energy ambitions to 60% power generation from renewable sources by 2030, a coal phase-out, and a 10% improvement in energy efficiency from a 2019 baseline. Domestic finance is expected to cover 35% of climate action costs.

== See also ==
- Climate change in Africa
- Climate change adaptation
- Agriculture in Mauritius
- Geography of Mauritius
