= Flore des Mascareignes =

Flora

The Flore des Mascareignes (Fl. Mascar.) is a flora, in French, covering the three islands in the Mascarenes: Réunion, Mauritius and Rodrigues.

== Project history ==
The project began in 1970 with the agreement signed in 1971, prepared jointly by the Institut de Recherche pour le Développement (IRD), the Mauritius Sugar Industry Research Institute (MSIRI), and the Royal Botanic Gardens, Kew. The completion of the Flora was funded by the EC's European Development Fund (1996).

The first editors appointed were J. Bosser (Editor-in-Chief), W. Marais, and Dr. R. Julien, with Dr. R.E. Vaughan as adviser. The first taxonomist was M.J.E. Coode, who worked on the Flora until the end of 1975; he was replaced by I.B.K. Richardson in 1976, who spent 6 weeks collecting in the Mascarenes. The Réunionnais botanist Thérésien Cadet also joined the project as a co-author and a member of the editorial board. He became the most significant plant collector for the flora, contributing extensive specimens from Réunion. The first fascicule of the Flora was published in 1976. The final two volumes, covering the orchids, were published in 2023.

The Flora treats the native flora in detail, including ferns, but includes naturalised and commonly cultivated plants.

Editors have been R. Antoine (MSIRI), J.C. Autrey (MSIRI), J. Bosser (IRD), J.P.M. Brenan (Kew), J. Heslop-Harrison (Kew), I.K. Ferguson (Kew), G.Mangenot (Orstom), C. Soopramanien (MSIRI).

== Flora ==
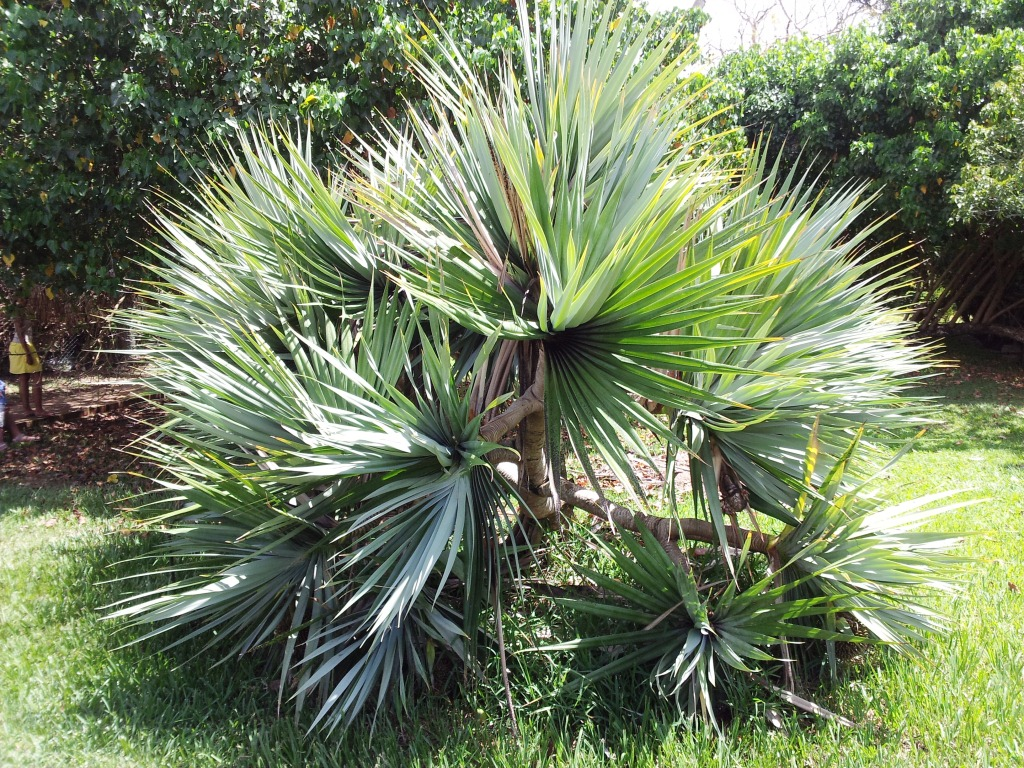
Pandanus vandermeeschii (Pandanaceae) is endemic to Mauritius.

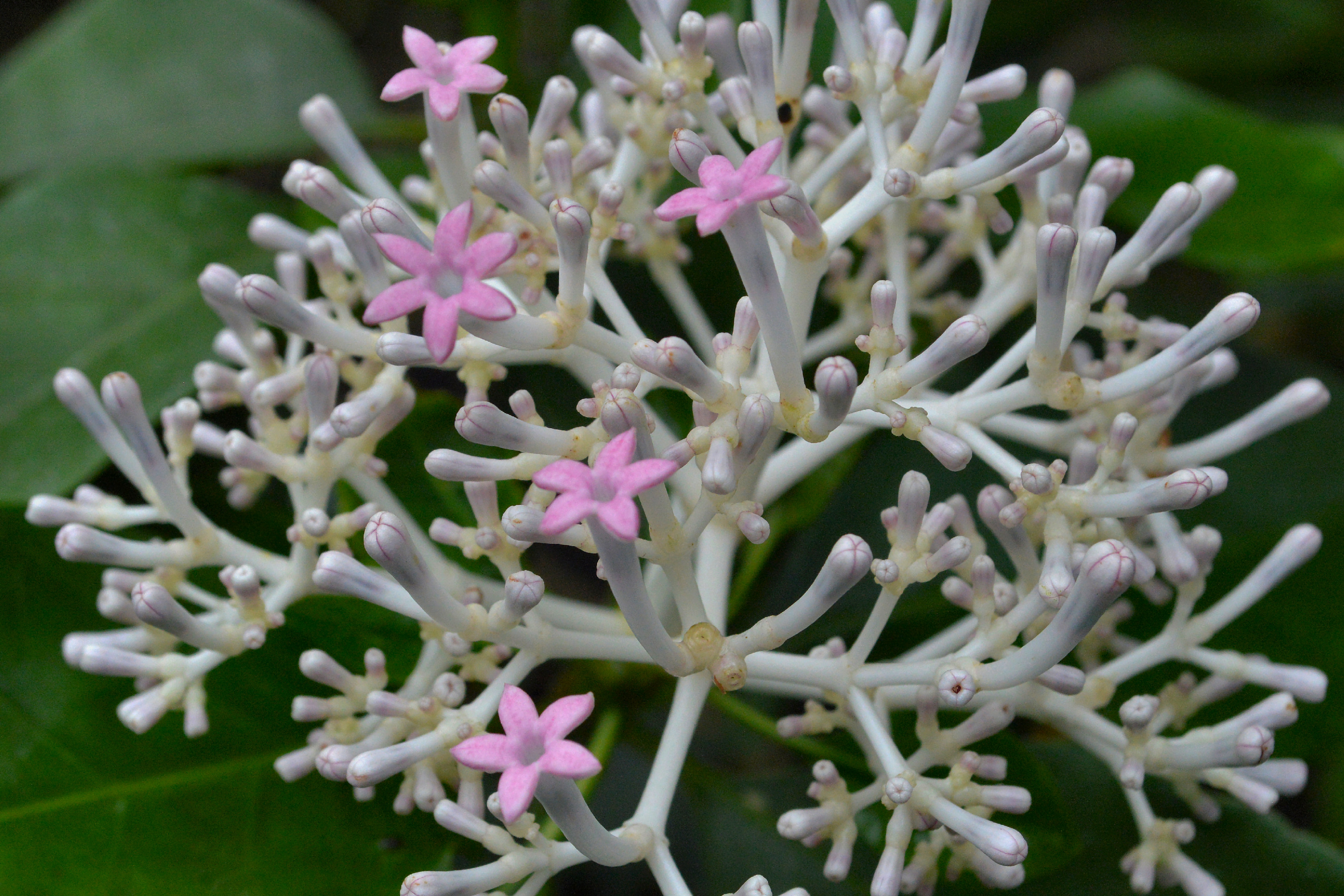
Chassalia boryana (Rubiaceae)

The Mascarenes have a high level of endemism, about 65%, with some shared between the islands of the archipelago. Others are found only on a single island, Rodrigues (47), Réunion (165) and Mauritius (273). Some are already extinct while most are threatened.

== Botanical history ==
There has been a long history of botanical studies on the islands of Mauritius and Réunion. The botany of Rodriguez was not studied until 1879.

- Bory de Saint-Vincent, Jean-Baptiste (1804). Voyage dans les quatre principales îles des mers d'Afrique, Ténériffe, Maurice, Bourbon et Sainte-Hélène – via BNF Gallica.
- Petit-Thouars, Louis-Marie Aubert du (1804). Histoire des végétaux recueillis dans les îles de France, de Bourbon et de Madagascar – via BNF Gallica.
- Bojer, W. (1837). Hortus Mauritianus: ou énumération des plantes, exotiques et indigènes, qui croissent a l'Ile Maurice, disposées d'après la méthode naturelle – via Biodiversity Heritage Library.
- Backhouse, James (1844). A Narrative of a Visit to the Mauritius and South Africa. Hamilton, Adams. ISBN 9780524087282 – via Google Books.
- Baker, J. Gilbert (1877). Flora of Mauritius and the Seychelles: a description of the flowering plants and ferns of those islands. Published under the authority of the Colonial Government of Mauritius. London: L. Reeve. hdl:2027/coo.31924001826761.
- Balfour, Isaac Bayley (1879). "The physical features of Rodriguez". Philosophical Transactions of the Royal Society. 168 (289–292): 289–292. doi:10.1098/rstl.1879.0032.
- - Balfour (1879). "Introductory remarks". Philosophical Transactions. 168 (302–325): 302–325. doi:10.1098/rstl.1879.0035.
- - Balfour (1879). "Flowering Plants and Ferns". Philosophical Transactions. 168 (326–387): 326–387. doi:10.1098/rstl.1879.0036.
- Jacob de Cordemoy, Eugène (1895). Flore de l'île de la Réunion (phanérogames, cryptogames, vasculaires, muscinées) avec l'indication des propriétés économiques & industrielles des plantes – via Biodiversity Heritage Library.
- Johnston, H.H. (1896). "Additions To The Flora Of Mauritius, As Recorded In Baker's "Flora Of Mauritius And The Seychelles."". Transactions of the Botanical Society of Edinburgh. 20 (1–4): 391–407. doi:10.1080/03746609609468880. hdl:2027/hvd.32044106358930.
- Vaughan, R.E. (1937). "Contributions to the flora of Mauritius.—I. An account of the naturalized flowering plants recorded from Mauritius since the publication of Baker's 'Flora of Mauritius and the Seychelles'". Journal of the Linnean Society of London, Botany. 51 (285–308). doi:10.1111/j.1095-8339.1937.tb01908.x.

== Geology ==
The Mascarenes are volcanic in origin. Reunion is the largest island, formed about 3 million years ago, rising to 3070m with an active volcano. Mauritius and Rodrigues were formed about 8-10 million years ago. Mauritius consists of large plains with steep mountains surrounding them, the remnants of an old caldera, that are only 828m high. Rodrigues is the smallest of the islands and is much eroded, reaching 398m high at Mt Limon.

== Families ==
Number	Family	Year published	Author
1	Psilotacées	2008	F. Badré
2	Equisetacées	2008	F. Badré
3	Lycopodiacées	2008	F. Badré
4	Selaginellacées	2008	F. Badré
5	Ophioglossacées	2008	F. Badré
6	Marattiacées	2008	F. Badré
7	Osmondacées	2008	F. Badré
8	Gleicheniacées	2008	F. Badré
9	Hymenophyllacées	2008	M.-L. Tardieu-Blot
10	Schizeacées	2008	F. Badré
11	Adiantacées	2008	F. Badré, D. Lorence
12	Vittariacées	2008	F. Badré
13	Cyatheacées	2008	T. Janssen
14	Dennstedtiacées	2008	F. Badré
15	Lindseacées	2008	F. Badré
16	Polypodiacées	2008	F. Badré
17	Grammitidacées	2008	F. Badré
18	Davalliacées	2008	F. Badré
19	Thelypteridacées	2008	R.E. Holtum
20	Aspidiacées	2008	F. Badré, R.E. Holtum, J.P. Roux
21	Athyriacées	2008	F. Badré
22	Lomariopsidacées	2008	D. Lorence, G. Rouhan
23	Blechnacées	2008	F. Badré
24	Aspleniacées	2008	M.-L. Tardieu-Blot
25	Salviniacées	2008	F. Badré
26	Marsileacées	2008	F. Badré
27	Araucariacées	1997	W. Marais
28	Pinacées	1997	W. Marais
28 bis	Taxodiacées	1997	W. Marais
29	Cupressacées	1997	W. Marais
29 bis	Podocarpacées	1997	W. Marais
30	Cycadacées	1997	W. Marais
30 bis	Zamiacées	1997	W. Marais
31	Renonculacées	1980	M.J.E. Coode
32	Dilléniacées	1980	W. Marais
33	Magnoliacées	1980	W. Marais
34	Annonacées	1980	M. Keraudren-Aymonin
35	Ménispermacées	1980	L.L. Forman
36	Nymphéacées	1980	W. Marais
37	Papavéracées	1980	W. Marais
38	Cruciféres	1980	W. Marais
39	Capparidacées	1980	W. Marais
40	Violacées	1980	W. Marais
41	Bixacées	1980	W. Marais
42	Flacourtiacées	1980	H. Sleumer adapte par J. Bosser
43	Pittosporacées	1980	M.J.E. Coode
44	Polygalacées	1980	W. Marais
45	Caryophyllacées	1980	W. Marais, M.J.E. Coode
46	Portulacacées	1980	W. Marais
47	Tamaricacées	1980	M.J.E. Coode
49	Guttiféres	1980	N.K.B. Robson, P.F. Stevens
50	Théacées	1980	W. Marais
51	Malvacées	1987	W. Marais, F. Friedmann
52	Bombacacées	1987	W. Marais
53	Sterculiacées	1987	F. Friedmann
54	Tiliacées	1987	J. Bosser
55	Eleocarpacées	1987	M.J.E. Coode
56	Linacées	1987	F. Friedmann
57	Erythroxylacées	1987	F. Friedmann
58	Malpighiacées	1987	F. Friedmann
59	Zygophyllacées	1987	M.J.E. Coode
60	Geraniacées	1987	W. Marais
61	Tropeolacées	1987	W. Marais
62	Oxalidacées	1987	W. Marais
64	Balsaminacées	1979	C. Grey-Wilson
65	Rutacées	1979	M.J.E. Coode
66	Surianacées	1979	M.J.E. Coode
67	Ochnacées	1979	I.B.K. Richardson
68	Burseracées	1979	M.J.E. Coode
69	Meliacées	1997	A.J. Scott (J. Bosser)
70	Olacacées	1997	A.J. Scott
71	Icacinacées	1997	A.J. Scott
72	Celastracées	1997	W. Marais (J. Bosser)
73	Rhamnacées	1997	J. Guého
74	Vitacées	1997	B. Descoings
75	Leeacées	1997	B. Descoings
76	Sapindacées	1997	F. Friedmann
77	Anacardiacées	1997	F. Friedmann
78	Moringacées	1997	Monique Keraudren-Aymonin
79	Connaracées	1997	Monique Keraudren-Aymonin
80	Legumineuses	1990	R.M. Polhill
81	Rosacées	1997	F. Friedmann
82	Chrysobalanacées	1997	F. Friedmann
83	Hydrangeacées	1997	A.J. Scott
84	Escalloniacées	1997	A.J. Scott
85	Brexiacées	1997	A.J. Scott
86	Cunoniacées	1997	A.J. Scott (J. Bosser)
87	Crassulacées	1997	F. Friedmann
88	Haloragidacées	1997	J. Bosser
89	Callitrichacées	1997	J. Bosser
90	Rhizophoracées	1990	A.J. Scott
91	Combretacées	1990	G.E. Wickens
92	Myrtacées	1990	A.J. Scott
93	Lecythidacées	1990	F. Friedmann, A.J. Scott
94	Melastomatacées	1990	G.E. Wickens
95	Lythracées	1990	M.J.E. Coode
96	Punicacées	1990	W. Marais
97	Onagracées	1990	A.J. Scott
98	Turneracées	1990	Maria Mercedes Arbo
99	Passifloracées	1990	A.J. Scott
100	Caricacées	1990	A.J. Scott
101	Cucurbitacées	1990	Monique Keraudren-Aymonin
102	Begoniacées	1990	M.J.S. Sands
103	Cactacées	1990	J.L. Guillaumet, W. Marais
104	Aizoacées	1990	W. Marais
105	Ombelliferes	1990	A.J. Scott
106	Araliacées	1990	W. Marais
107	Caprifoliacées	1989	W. Marais
108	Rubiacées	1989	B. Verdcourt, J.F. Leroy, D.D. Tirvengadum
108 bis	Valerianacées	1989	M.J.E. Coode
109	Composees	1993	D.J.N. Hind, C. Jeffrey, A.J. Scott
110	Goodeniacées	1976	J.-L. Guillaumet
111	Campanulacées	1976/1981	F. Badré, W. Marais
112	Ericacées	1981	F. Friedmann
113	Plombaginacées	1981	W. Marais
114	Primulacées	1981	J.L. Guillaumet
115	Myrsinacées	1981	M.J.E. Coode
116	Sapotacées	1981	F. Friedmann
117	Ebenacées	1981	I.B.K. Richardson
118	Styracacées	1981	J. Bosser
119	Oleacées	1981	A.J. Scott
120	Salvadoracées	1981	J. Bosser
121	Apocynacées	2005	A.J.M. Leewenberg, Rudjiman
122	Asclepiadacées	2005	J. Bosser, W. Marais
123	Loganiacées	2005	A.J.M. Leewenberg
124	Gentianacées	2005	W.Marais
125	Menyanthacées	2005	J. Bosser
126	Borraginacées	2005	C. Feuillet (J. Bosser)
127	Convolvulacées	2000	J. Bosser, H. Heine
127 bis	Polemoniacées	2000	J. Bosser
128	Solanacées	2000	A.J. Scott
129	Scrofulariacées	2000	F.N. Hepper
130	Orobanchacées	2000	F.N. Hepper
131	Lentibulariacées	2000	P. Taylor
132	Gesneriacées	2000	C. Feuillet
133	Bignoniacées	2000	J.Bosser, H. Heine
133 bis	Cobaeacées	2000	J. Bosser
134	Pedaliacées	2000	J. Bosser
135	Acanthacées	2000	J. Bosser, H. Heine
136	Myoporacées	1994	J. Bosser
137	Verbenacées	1994	A.J. Scott
138	Nesogenacées	1994	W. Marais
139	Labiees	1994	A.J. Scott, J. Bosser
140	Plantaginacées	1994	A.J. Scott
141	Nyctaginacées	1994	D. Philcox, M.J.E. Coode
142	Amaranthacées	1994	C.C. Townsend
143	Chenopodiacées	1994	J.P.M. Brenan
144	Basellacées	1994	J.P.M. Brenan
145	Phytolaccacées	1994	D. Philcox, M.J.E. Coode
146	Polygonacées	1994	A.J. Scott
147	Tristichacées	1994	C. Cusset
148	Hydnoracées	1994	J. Bosser
149	Aristolochiacées	1998	J. Bosser
150	Piperacées	1998	F. Friedmann
150 bis	Saururacées	1998	F. Friedmann
151	Myristicacées	1998	J. Guého
152	Monimiacées	1998	D.H. Lorence
153	Lauracées	1982	A.J.G.H. Kostermans
154	Hernandiacées	1982	A.J. Scott
155	Proteacées	1982	A.J. Scott
156	Thymeleacées	1982	A.J. Scott
157	Eleagnacées	1982	A.J. Scott
158	Loranthacées	1982	D. Philcox
159	Santalacées	1982	A.J. Scott
160	Euphorbiacées	1982	M.J.E. Coode
161	Urticacées	1985	W. Marais, S. Jellis
162	Ulmacées	1985	W. Marais
163	Cannabacées	1985	W. Marais
164	Moracées	1985	C.C. Berg, E.C.H. van Heusden
165	Platanacées	1985	W. Marais
166	Juglandacées	1985	W. Marais
167	Casuarinacées	1985	M.J.E. Coode
168	Fagacées	1985	W. Marais
169	Salicacées	1985	W. Marais
169 bis	Ceratophyllacées	1985	W. Marais
170	Orchidées Vol 1	2023	J. Hermans, P.J. Cribb
170	Orchidées Vol 2	2023	J. Hermans, P.J. Cribb, T. Pailler
171	Zingiberacées	1983	R.M. Smith
173	Marantacées	1983	E.J. Cowley
174	Musacées	1983	W. Marais
175	Cannacées	1983	W. Marais
176	Bromeliacées	1983	D. Philcox
177	Iridacées	1978	W. Marais
178	Amaryllidacées	1978	W. Marais
179	Hypoxidacées	1978	W. Marais
180	Agavacées	1978	W. Marais, M.J.E. Coode
181	Taccacées	1978	M.J.E. Coode
182	Dioscoreacées	1978	W. Marais
183	Liliacées	1978	W. Marais, M.J.E. Coode
184	Pontederiacées	1978	M.J.E. Coode
185	Xyridacées	1978	M.J.E. Coode
186	Commelinacées	1978	B. Mathew
187	Flagellariacées	1978	M.J.E. Coode
188	Joncacées	1978	M.J.E. Coode
189	Palmiers	1984	H.E. Moore Jr., J. Guého
190	Pandanacées	2003	J. Bosser, J. Guého
191	Typhacées	1984	W. Marais
192	Aracées	1984	S.J. Mayo
193	Lemnacées	1984	A.J. Scott
194	Hydrocharitacées	1984	A.J. Scott
195	Najadacées	1984	A.J. Scott
196	Alismatacées	1984	A.J. Scott
197	Aponogetonacées	1984	A.J. Scott
198	Potamogetonacées	1984	A.J. Scott
199	Ruppiacées	1984	A.J. Scott
200	Zannichelliacées	1984	A.J. Scott
201	Eriocaulacées	1984	M.J.E. Coode
202	Cyperacées	2018	W. Marais, A.C. Araujo
203	Graminées	2018	J. Bosser, S.A. Renvoize
	Glossaire	1987	R. Antoine, J. Bosser, I.K. Ferguson
