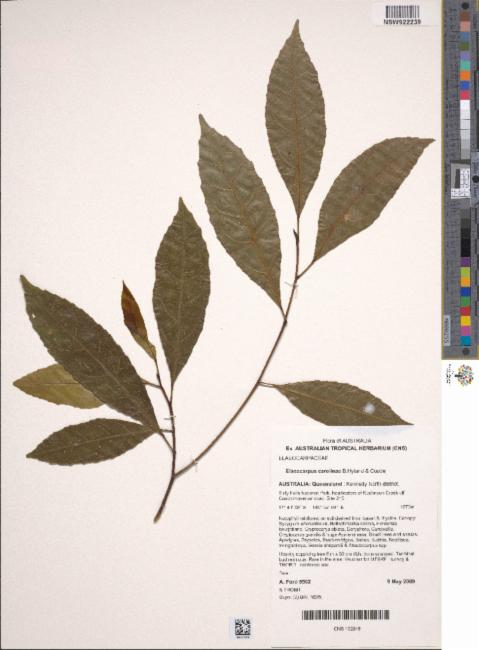

Scientific classification
- Kingdom: Plantae
- Clade: Tracheophytes
- Clade: Angiosperms
- Clade: Eudicots
- Clade: Rosids
- Order: Oxalidales
- Family: Elaeocarpaceae
- Genus: Elaeocarpus
- Species: E. carolinae

Binomial name
- Elaeocarpus carolinae B.Hyland & Coode

= Elaeocarpus carolinae =

Species of tree endemic to Queensland

Elaeocarpus carolinae is a species of flowering plant in the family Elaeocarpaceae and is endemic to north-east Queensland. It is a tree with buttress roots at the base of the trunk, elliptic to oblong leaves with wavy-toothed edges, flowers with five white petals with lobed tips and spherical blue to purple fruit.

== Description ==
Elaeocarpus carolinae is a tree that typically grows to a height or 8–24 m (26–79 ft) with buttress roots at the base of the trunk. The leaves are grouped near the ends of the twigs, elliptic to oblong with between ten and twenty-five wavy teeth on the edges, 55–100 mm (2.2–3.9 in) long and 18–26 mm (0.71–1.02 in) wide on a petiole 15–25 mm (0.59–0.98 in) long. The flowers are borne in groups of up to ten on a rachis 20–40 mm (0.79–1.57 in) long, each flower on a winged pedicel 2–4 mm (0.079–0.157 in) long. The flowers have five narrow egg-shaped sepals 10–11 mm (0.39–0.43 in) long and 2–3 mm (0.079–0.118 in) wide. The five petals are white, narrow oblong, 10–14 mm (0.39–0.55 in) long and about 2 mm (0.079 in) wide with thin lobes at the tip, and there are fifteen or sixteen stamens. The fruit is a more or less spherical drupe about 13–15 mm (0.51–0.59 in) long and 12–14 mm (0.47–0.55 in) wide.

== Taxonomy ==
Elaeocarpus carolinae was first formally described in 1984 by Bernard Hyland and Mark James Elgar Coode in the Kew Bulletin from material collected in 1979.

== Distribution and habitat ==
Elaeocarpus carolinae is endemic to north-east Queensland, where it is only known from the Windsor Tableland growing in rainforest at altitudes of 1,000–1,200 m (3,300–3,900 ft).

== Conservation status ==
This quandong is listed as of 'least concern' under the Queensland Government Nature Conservation Act 1992.

== See also ==
- List of Elaeocarpus species
