= List of sugar mills in Mauritius =

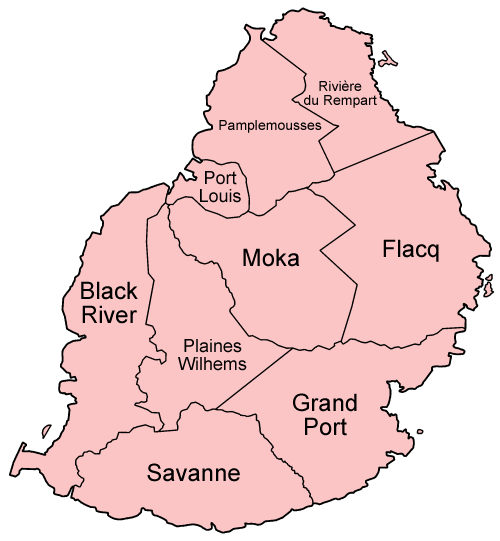

== Sugar mills of Mauritius 1948 ==
A list of Mauritius sugar mills showing those that have disappeared and those still in existence in 1948 (in bold) and being updated for 2017 is detailed below. It is derived from ANNEXE IV of Pierre de Sornay's 1952 Book, "Isle de France, Ile Maurice" de Sornay, Pierre (1952). Isle de France, Ile Maurice.

- La Caroline, Port Louis
- Village, Port Louis
- Beau Plan, Pamplemousses
- L'Industrie||Pamplemousses
- Belle Vue Rivet, Pamplemousses
- L'Unite (L'union Bourgault), Pamplemousses
- **Belle Vue** Harel (Terra), **Pamplemousses**
- Maison Blanche (Clementine), Pamplemousses
- Belle Vue Pilot (Bois Rouge), Pamplemousses
- Mauricia (La Louise), Pamplemousses
- Bois Mangues, Pamplemousses
- Mon Choix, Pamplemousses
- Bon Air, Pamplemousses
- Mon Desir, Pamplemousses
- Bon Espoir, Pamplemousses
- Mon Espoir, Pamplemousses
- Boulle, Pamplemousses
- Mon Rocher, Pamplemousses
- California, Pamplemousses
- Mont Choisy, Pamplemousses
- Constance, Pamplemousses
- Mont Piton, Pamplemousses
- Elmina, Pamplemousses
- Petite Rosalie, Pamplemousses
- Fairfund, Pamplemousses
- Plessis, Pamplemousses
- Fond du Sac, Pamplemousses
- Rouge Terre, Pamplemousses
- Grande Rosalie, Pamplemousses
- Saint Andre (les Rochers), Pamplemousses
- L'Amitie (Grand'Garde), Pamplemousses
- Solitude, Pamplemousses
- L'Agrement, Pamplemousses
- Sottise, Pamplemousses
- L'Asile, Pamplemousses
- The Mount, Pamplemousses
- la Nicoliere, Pamplemousses
- Triolet, Pamplemousses
- La paix, Pamplemousses
- Valton, Pamplemousses
- L'Esperance Pilot, Pamplemousses
- Ville Valio, Pamplemousses
- L'Espoir, Pamplemousses
- Windsor, Pamplemousses
- Antoinette, Riviere Du Rempart
- Mare Seche, Riviere Du Rempart
- Beau Manguier, Riviere Du Rempart
- Melville (Roc en Roc), Riviere Du Rempart
- Beau Sejour, Riviere Du Rempart
- Mon Losir Rouillard, Riviere Du Rempart
- Belle Rive, Riviere Du Rempart
- Mon Loisir Lagesse, Riviere Du Rempart
- Mapou, Riviere Du Rempart
- Belle Vue Cugnet, Riviere Du Rempart
- Mon Songe, Riviere Du Rempart
- Belle Vue Maurel, Riviere Du Rempart
- Mon Triomphe, Riviere Du Rempart
- Belle Vue Robillard, Riviere Du Rempart
- Mont Mascal, Riviere Du Rempart
- Belmont, Riviere Du Rempart
- Moulin, Riviere Du Rempart
- Bon Espoir, Riviere Du Rempart
- Mont Oreb (Grand'Baie), Riviere Du Rempart
- Cottage, Riviere Du Rempart
- Petit Village, Riviere Du Rempart
- Deux Amis, Riviere Du Rempart
- Poudre D'Or, Riviere Du Rempart
- Esperance, Riviere Du Rempart
- Ravensworth, Riviere Du Rempart
- Figette, Riviere Du Rempart
- Ravin, Riviere Du Rempart
- Forbach, Riviere Du Rempart
- Reunion, Riviere Du Rempart
- Goodlands, Riviere Du Rempart
- Roches Noires, Riviere Du Rempart
- Haute Rive, Riviere Du Rempart
- Roche Terre, Riviere Du Rempart
- Ile D'ambre, Riviere Du Rempart
- Saint Antoine, Riviere Du Rempart
- Labourdonnais, Riviere Du Rempart
- St. Francois (Roche Croix), Riv. Rempart
- la Caroline, Riviere Du Rempart
- La Lucia, Riviere Du Rempart
- Schoenfeld, Riviere Du Rempart
- L'Amitie Desjardins, Riviere Du Rempart
- The Vale, Riviere Du Rempart
- L'Union Delcourt, Riviere Du Rempart
- Union Daruty, Riviere Du Rempart
- Le Rocher, Riviere Du Rempart
- Woodford (La Salette), Riv. Du Rempart
- Argy, Flacq
- Deep River, Flacq
- Australia, Flacq
- Etoile Hewetson, Flacq
- Beau Bassin, Flacq
- Gibraltar, Flacq
- Beau Bois, Flacq
- Grande Retraite, Flacq
- Beau Champ, Flacq
- La Gaiete, Flacq
- Beau Rivage, Flacq
- La Louise, Flacq
- Beau Vallon Dubois, Flacq
- La lucie (Les Freres), Flacq
- Beau Vallon Fabre, Flacq
- La Villette, Flacq
- Bel Etang, Flacq
- **L'Union (Alteo)**, **Flacq**
- Belle Etoile, Flacq
- L'Unite, Flacq
- Belle Mare, Flacq
- Mare Triton, Flacq
- Belle Rive, Flacq
- Mon Reve, Flacq
- Belles Roches (Quatre Cocos), Flacq
- Mont Ida, Flacq
- Belle Rose, Flacq
- Olivia, Flacq
- Belle Vue Piat, Flacq
- Palmar, Flacq
- Belle Vue La Nougarede, Flacq
- Petite Retraite, Flacq
- Bon Accueil, Flacq
- Providence, Flacq
- Bon Espoir, Flacq
- Quatre Soeurs, Flacq
- Bras D'Eau, Flacq
- Rich Fund, Flacq
- Caroline, Flacq
- Riche Mare, Flacq
- Example, Flacq
- Choisy, Flacq
- Saint Julien, Flacq
- Clemencia (Magenta), Flacq
- Sans Souci, Flacq
- Constance, Flacq
- Sebastopol, Flacq
- Constance Manes, Flacq
- Victoria, Flacq
- Anse Jonchée, Grand Port
- Mon Desert(Mon Tresor), Grand Prt
- Astroea, Grand Port
- Mont Eulalie (Mt Fernand), Grand Prt
- Beau Fond, Grand Port
- Mon Tresor, Grand Port
- Beau Vallon Rochecouste, Grand Prt
- New Grove, Grand Port
- Belle Vue, Grand Port
- Petit Sable, Grand Port
- Bonne Source, Grand Port
- Plaisance, Grand Port
- Cent Gaulettes, Grand Port
- Riche en Eau, Grand Port
- Richfield, Grand Port
- Cluny, Grand Port
- Riviere Creole, Grand Port
- Deux Bras, Grand Port
- Riviere La Chaux, Grand Port
- Eau Bleue, Grand Port
- Rose Belle, Grand Port
- **Ferney**, **Grand Port**
- Saint Hubert, Grand Port
- Grand Sable, Grand Port
- Sauveterre, Grand Port
- Gros Bois, Grand Port
- Savinia, Grand Port
- Hangar, Grand Port
- Souffleur, Grand Port
- Joli Bois, Grand Port
- Union Park (La Perouse), Grand Port
- La Rosa, Grand Port
- Union Vale (Les Mares Du Tabac), Grand Port
- Les Mares, Grand Port
- Le Vallon (Beau Vallon Dauban), Grand Port
- Valona (Cent Gaulettes puis le Val), Grand Port
- **La Baraque Savinia Ltd.,**, **Grand Port**
- Villeneuve, Grand Port
- Mare d'Albert, Grand Port
- Virginia, Grand Port
- Beau Bois, Savane
- La Flora, Savane
- Beau Champ, Savane
- **L'Union Ducray**, **Savane**
- Bel Air Hardouin, Savane
- **L'Union St. Felix**, **Savane**
- Bel Air Montocchio, Savane
- Luchon (La Foret), Savane
- **Bel Ombre**, **Savane**
- Riche Bois, Savane
- **Benares**, **Savane**
- Riviere des Anguilles, Savane
- Bois Cheri (Caledonia), Savane
- Rochester, Savane
- Britannia, Savane
- Constance, Savane
- Saint Aubin, Savane
- Chamouny, Savane
- Saint Avold, Savane
- Choisy, Savane
- Bel Air Saint Felix, Savane
- Colmar, Savane
- Constantine, Savane
- Sainte Marie, Savane
- Combe, Savane
- **Savannah**, **Savane**
- Eastwick Park, Savane
- Surinam, Savane
- Fontenelle, Savane
- Terracine, Savane
- Frederica, Savane
- Bagatelle, Plaine Wilhems
- La Reunion, Plaine Wilhems
- Bassin, Plaine Wilhems
- Mare aux Vacoas (Good End), Plaine Wilhems
- Beau Bassin, Plaine Wilhems
- Beau Fond (Bon Accord), Plaine Wilhems
- Mon Desir, Plaine Wilhems
- Beau Sejour, Plaine Wilhems
- Mon Repos Giblot, Plaine Wilhems
- Belle Terre, Plaine Wilhems
- Millvale, Plaine Wilhems
- Bonne Terre, Plaine Wilhems
- Mont Roche, Plaine Wilhems
- Cascade, Plaine Wilhems
- Plaisance, Plaine Wilhems
- Chebel, Plaine Wilhems
- Clairfonds, Plaine Wilhems
- Richelieu, Plaine Wilhems
- Ebene, Plaine Wilhems
- Roche Brune, Plaine Wilhems
- Henrietta (Moneymusk), Plaine Wilhems
- Solferino, Plaine Wilhems
- **Highlands (Vaucluse)**, **Plaine Wilhems**
- Stanley (Bellevue), Plaine Wilhems
- Hollywood, Plaine Wilhems
- Tamarin Falls, Plaine Wilhems
- La Louise, Plaine Wilhems
- **Trianon**, **Plaine Wilhems**
- La Marie (Alexandrie), Plaine Wilhems
- **Reunion**, **Plaine Wilhems**
- Amitie, Riviere Noire
- La Mecque, Riviere Noire
- Anna, Riviere Noire
- L'Amitie, Riviere Noire
- Albion(les Moulins), Riviere Noire
- Le Bosquet, Riviere Noire
- Beaux Songes, Riviere Noire
- Le Morne, Riviere Noire
- Belle Isle, Riviere Noire
- Magenta, Riviere Noire
- Belle Rive, Riviere Noire
- **Medine**, **Riviere Noire**
- Belle Vue, Riviere Noire
- Mon Repos, Riviere Noire
- Palma, Riviere Noire
- Belle Vue, Riviere Noire
- Pierrefonds, Riviere Noire
- Riviere Dragon, Riviere Noire
- Case Noyale, Riviere Noire
- Riviere Noire, Riviere Noire
- Chamarel, Riviere Noire
- Tamarin, Riviere Noire
- Cressonville, Riviere Noire
- Wolmar, Riviere Noire
- Gros Cailloux, Riviere Noire
- Walhala, Riviere Noire
- La Ferme (La Chaumiere), Riviere Noire
- Yemen, Riviere Noire
- Agrement, MOKA
- Helvetia, MOKA
- Alma (Champ D'Or), MOKA
- Hermitage, MOKA
- Bar-le-Duc, MOKA
- La Laura (Pieter Both), MOKA
- Beau Bois, MOKA
- L'Union Melrose, MOKA
- Bon Air, MOKA
- Magenta, MOKA
- Bonne Veine, MOKA
- Midlands, MOKA
- Circonstance, MOKA
- Minissy, MOKA
- Cote D'Or, MOKA
- **Mon Desert**, **MOKA**
- Escalier, MOKA
- Roselyn Cottage, MOKA
- Esperance, MOKA
- Valetta, MOKA

== See also ==
- Sugar industry of Mauritius
