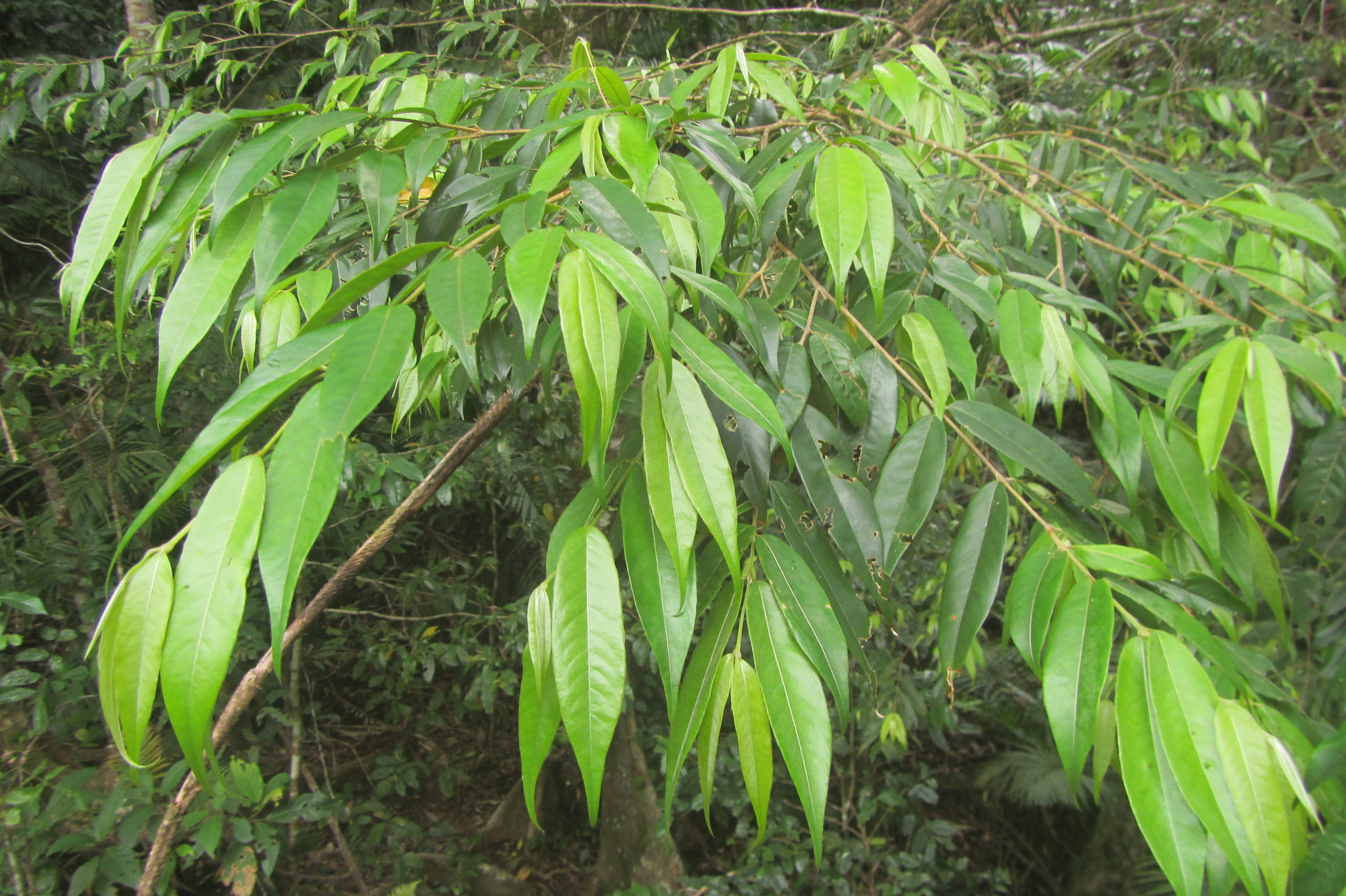
- Foliage and habit

Conservation status
- Least Concern (IUCN 3.1)

Scientific classification
- Kingdom: Plantae
- Clade: Tracheophytes
- Clade: Angiosperms
- Clade: Eudicots
- Clade: Rosids
- Order: Oxalidales
- Family: Elaeocarpaceae
- Genus: Aceratium
- Species: A. megalospermum

Binomial name
- Aceratium megalospermum (F.Muell.) Balgooy

Synonyms
- Aristotelia megalosperma F.Muell.; Aceratium megalospermum var. coriaceum Balgooy; Aristotelia trilocularis F.M.Bailey; Elaeocarpus corymbifer Domin

= Aceratium megalospermum =

Bolly carabeen

Species of flowering plant

Aceratium megalospermum, commonly known as bolly carabeen, creek aceratium or carabeen, is a plant in the family Elaeocarpaceae found only in the Wet Tropics bioregion of Queensland, Australia.

== Description ==
This is a small tree up to 15 m (49 ft) tall with small lanceolate to elliptic leaves arranged in opposite pairs. Flowers have five sepals and petals, and the petals are up to 17 mm (0.67 in) long by 3.5 mm (0.14 in) wide. Ripe fruit are red and contain a single seed. They measure about 18 mm (0.71 in) long and 9 mm (0.35 in) wide.

== Taxonomy ==
The species was first described as Aristotelia megalosperma by Ferdinand von Mueller in 1875, but in 1963 it was transferred to the genus Aceratium and given its current combination by the Indonesian-born botanist Max Michael Josephus van Balgooy.

== Distribution and habitat ==
The bolly carabeen is found only in coastal northeastern Queensland, from about Cooktown to about Tully. It grows in well developed rainforest at altitudes from sea level to about 600 m (2,000 ft). It is often found in gullies and alongside creeks.

== Conservation ==
As of August 2024, the status of this species is assessed as least concern by the International Union for Conservation of Nature (IUCN) and under the Queensland Government's Nature Conservation Act.

== Gallery ==
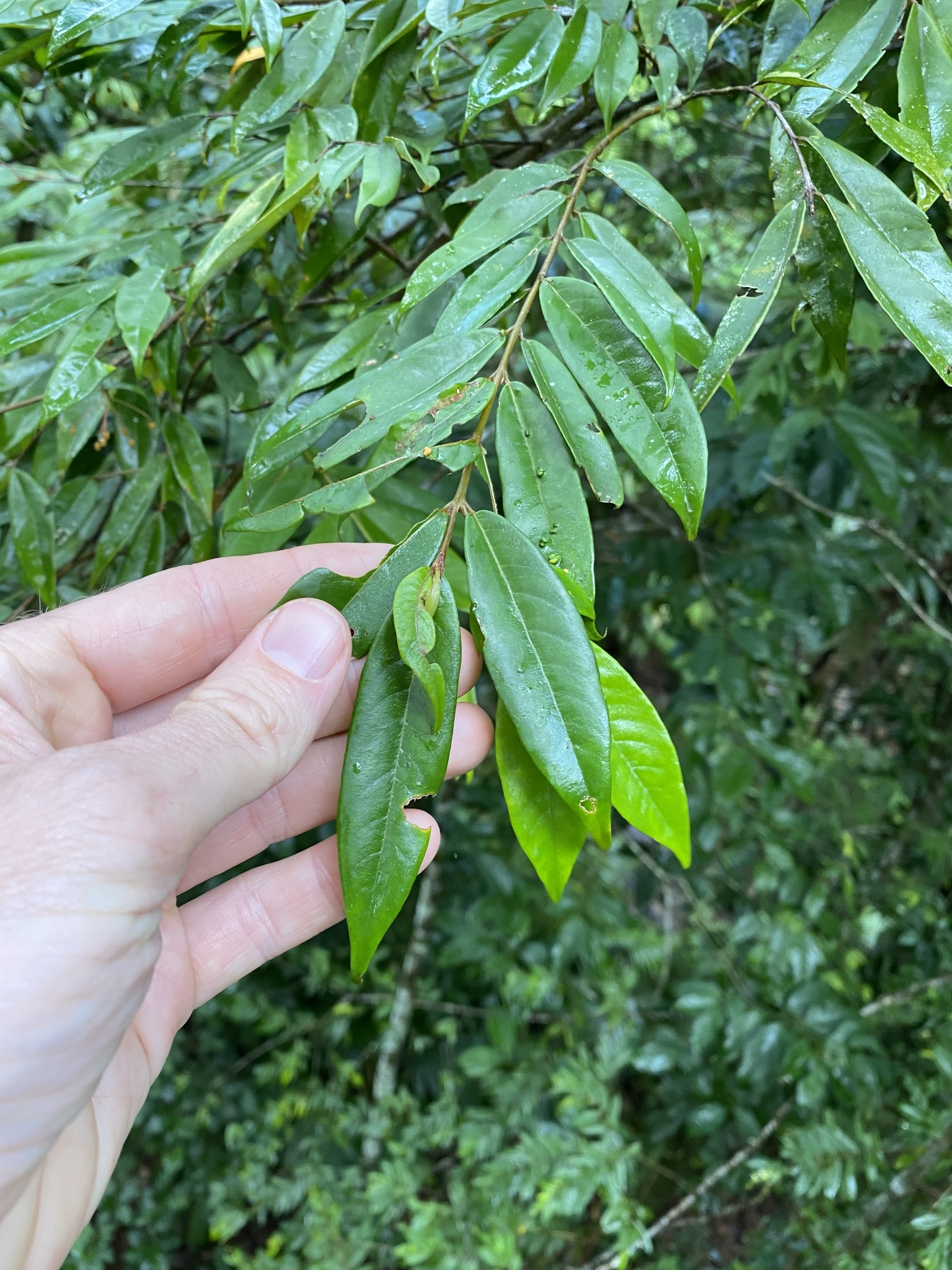
Foliage detail

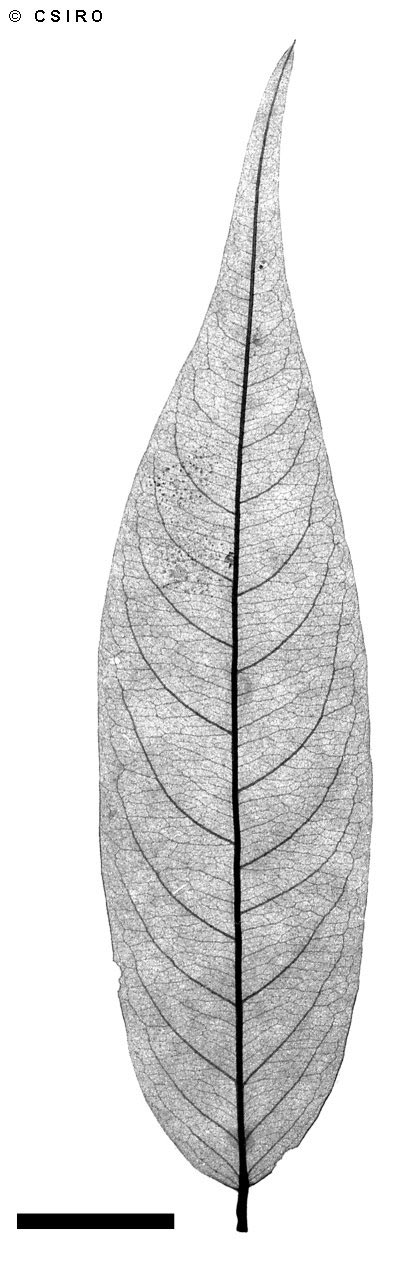
X-ray of leaf

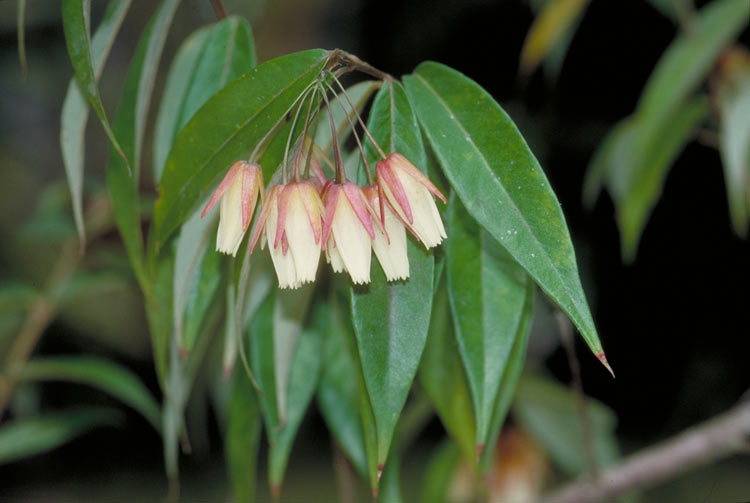
Flowers

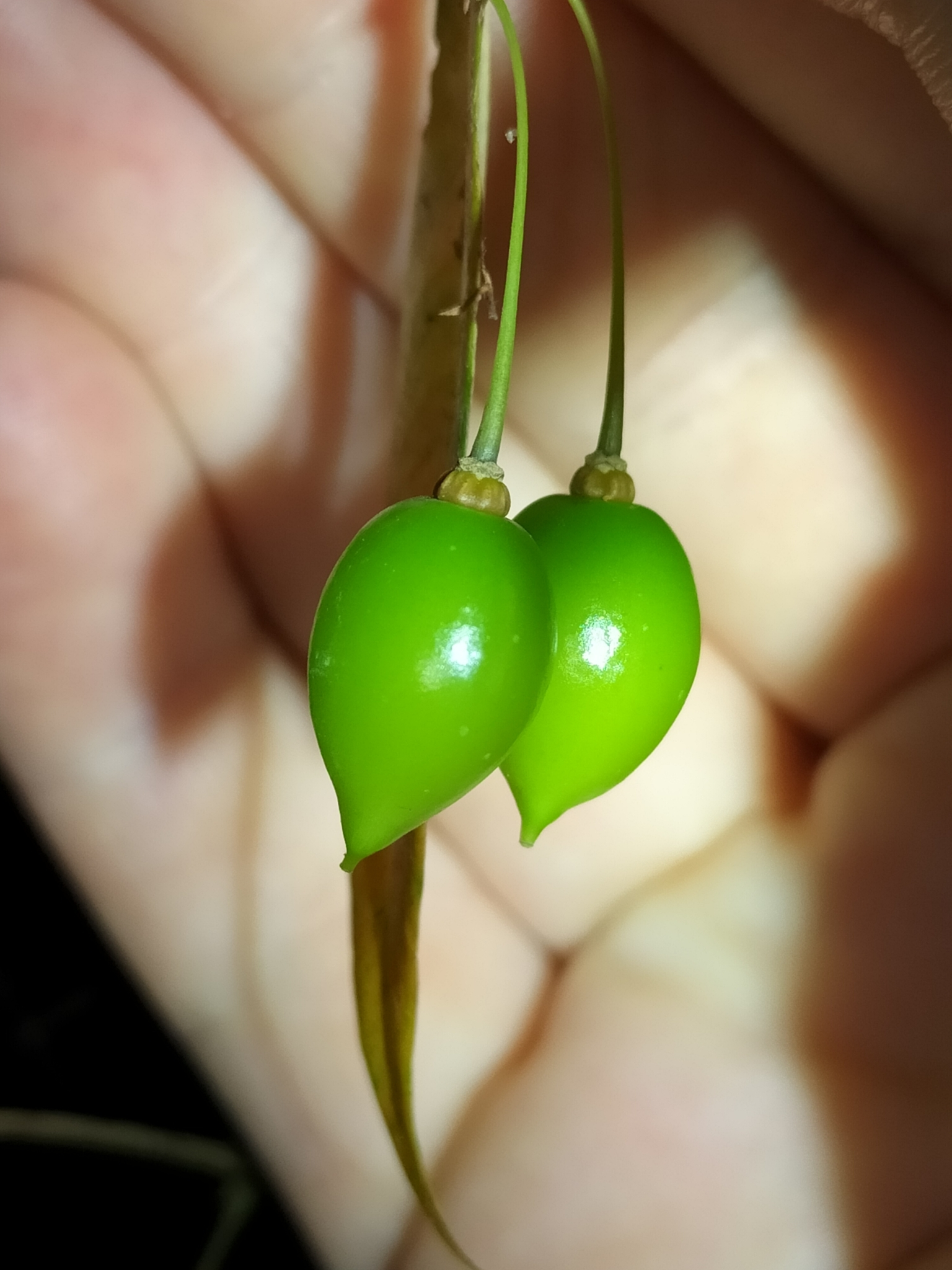
Immature fruit

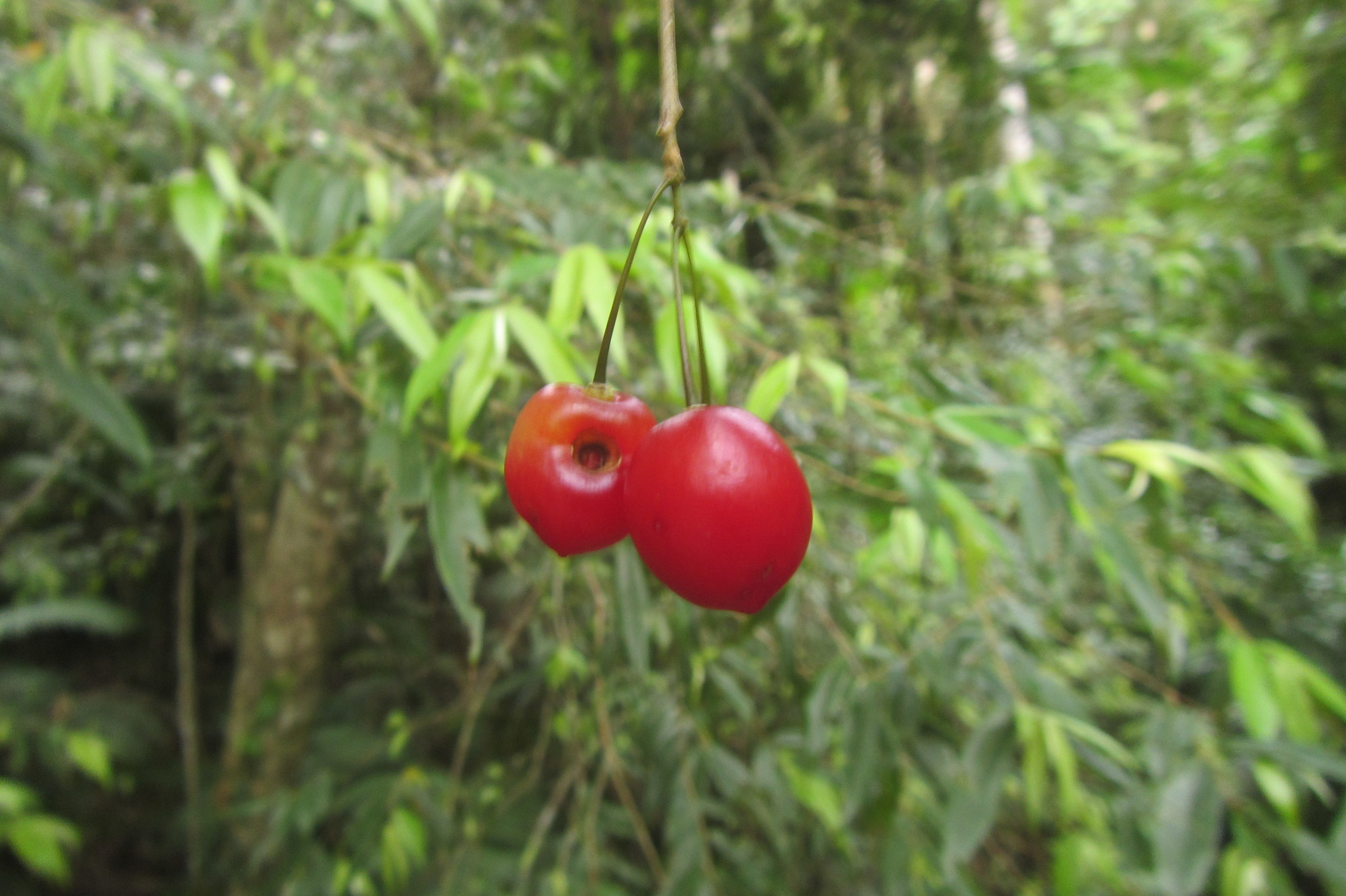
Ripe fruit
