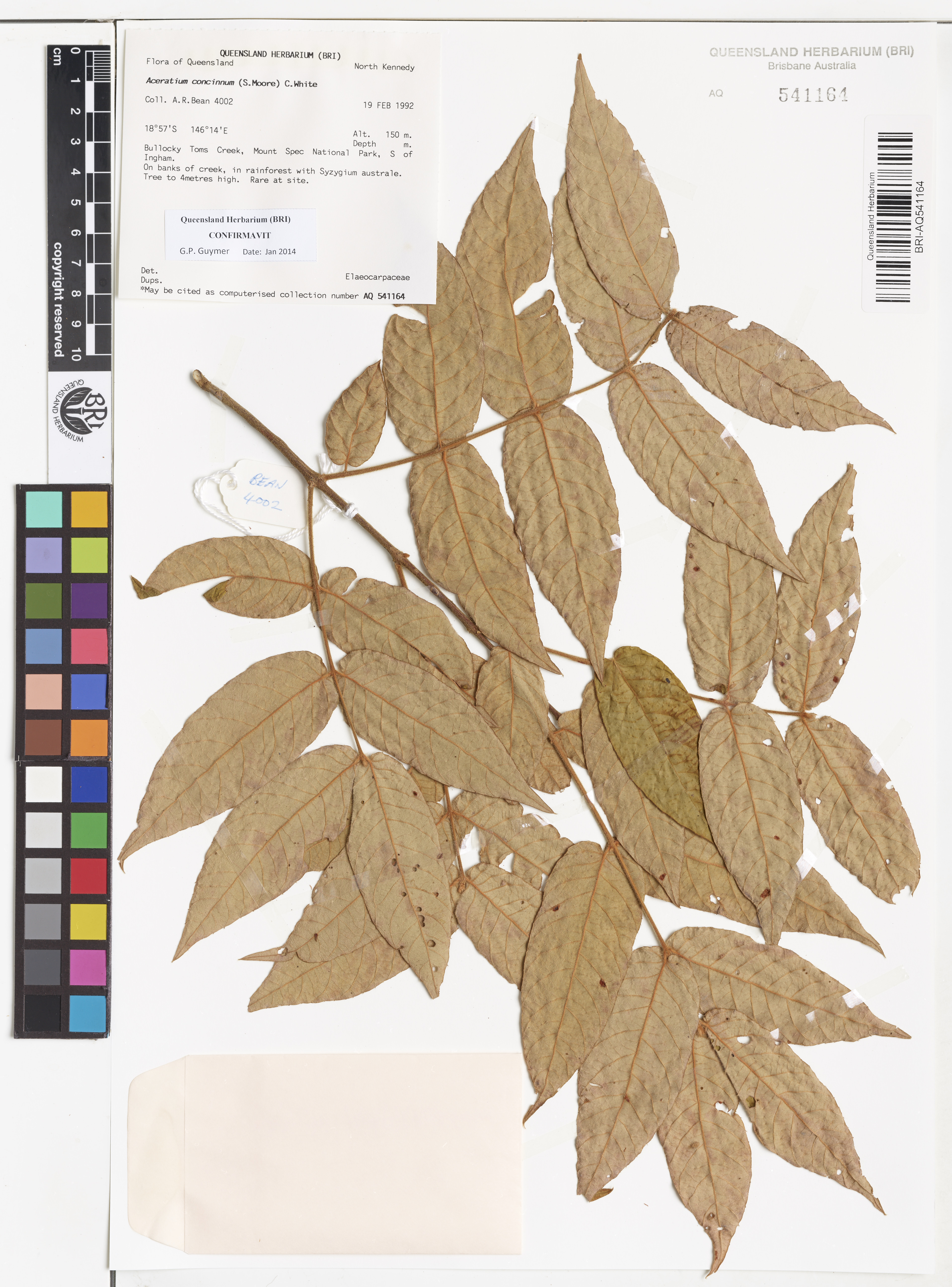
- Herbarium specimen

Conservation status
- Least Concern (IUCN 3.1)

Scientific classification
- Kingdom: Plantae
- Clade: Embryophytes
- Clade: Tracheophytes
- Clade: Spermatophytes
- Clade: Angiosperms
- Clade: Eudicots
- Clade: Rosids
- Order: Oxalidales
- Family: Elaeocarpaceae
- Genus: Aceratium
- Species: A. concinnum

Binomial name
- Aceratium concinnum C.T.White

= Aceratium concinnum =

Species of flowering plant

Aceratium concinnum, commonly known as hard carabeen, is a species of plant in the family Elaeocarpaceae. It is native to the Wet Tropics bioregion of Queensland, Australia.

== Description ==
Aceratium concinnum is a tree growing up to 25 m (82 ft) tall, often with new shoots rising from the base of the trunk. The young branches and other parts of the plant are densely covered with soft hairs. Leaves are arranged in opposite pairs on the twigs and measure up to 12 cm (4.7 in) long and 5 cm (2.0 in) wide. The flowers are fragrant and have four or five pale green or cream fringed petals about 16 mm (0.6 in) long. The fruit is a reddish drupe about 18 mm (0.7 in) long and 10 mm (0.4 in) wide. They are hairy and contain one to three seeds.

== Distribution and habitat ==
The hard carabeen grows in rainforest from near Cooktown to around Paluma, at altitudes from sea level to about 1,100 m (3,600 ft).

== Conservation ==
As of July 2026, this species has been assessed to be of least concern by the International Union for Conservation of Nature (IUCN) and by the Queensland Government under its Nature Conservation Act. The reasoning provided by the IUCN for this assessment is that the species has a large and widely distributed population and that no current or future threats are known.

== Gallery ==
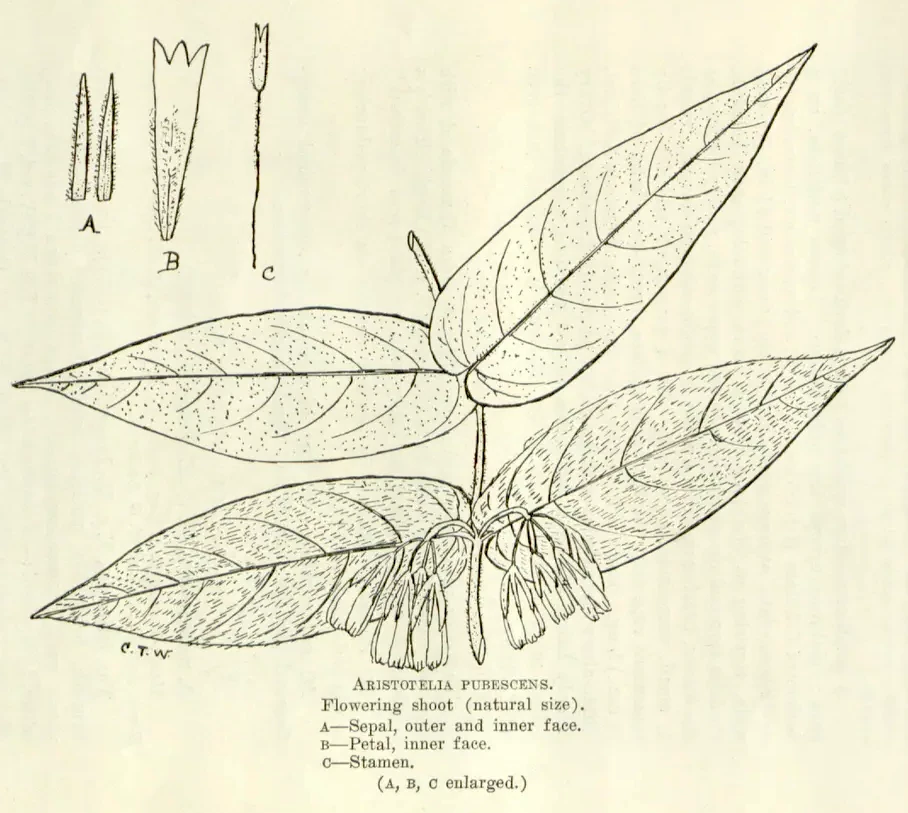
Sketch by C.T.White, 1917

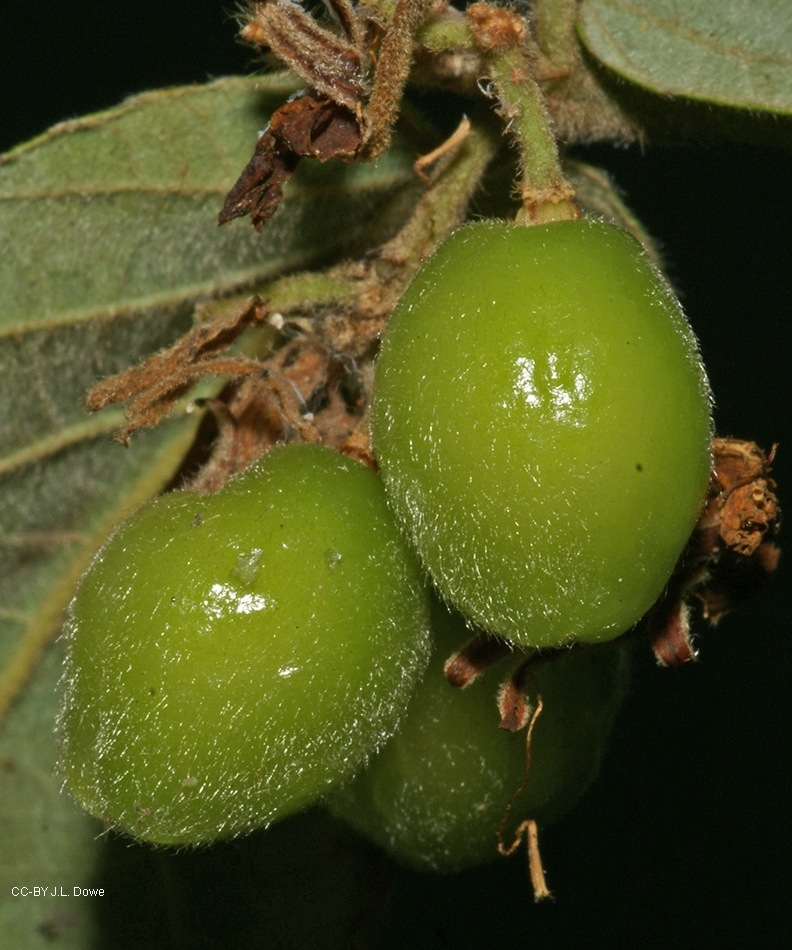
Fruit

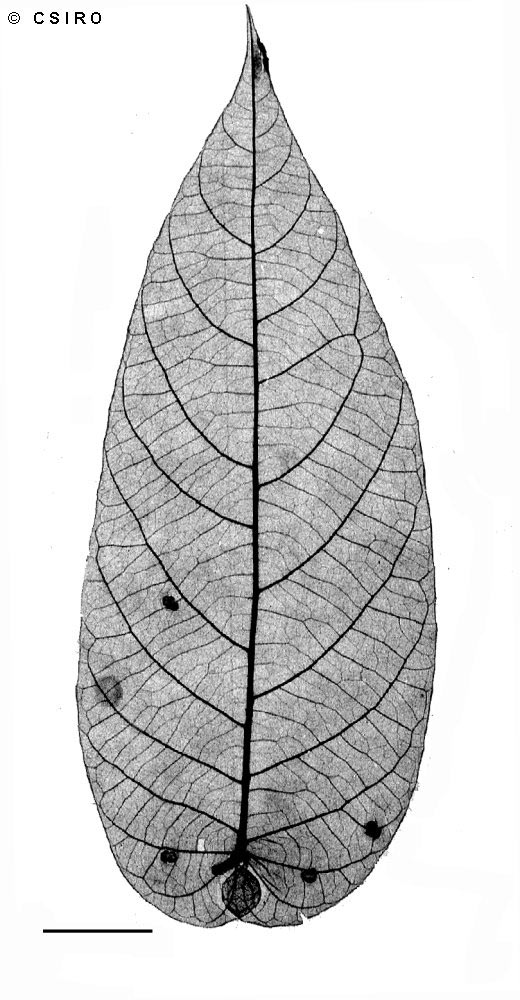
X-ray of a leaf
