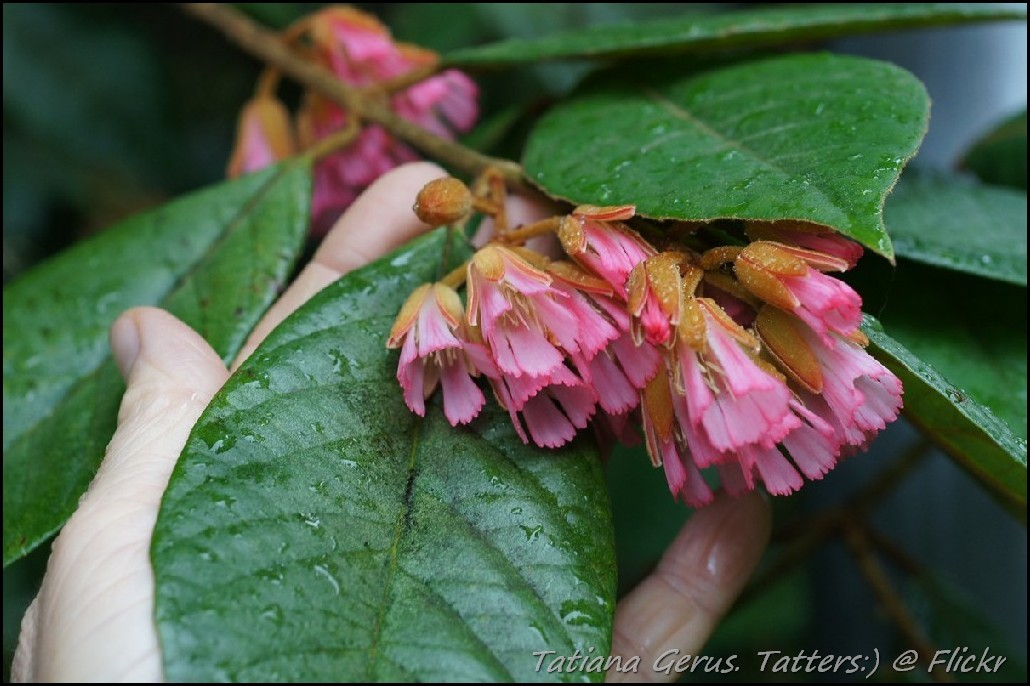
- Flowers, cultivated plant at Roma Street Parkland, Brisbane
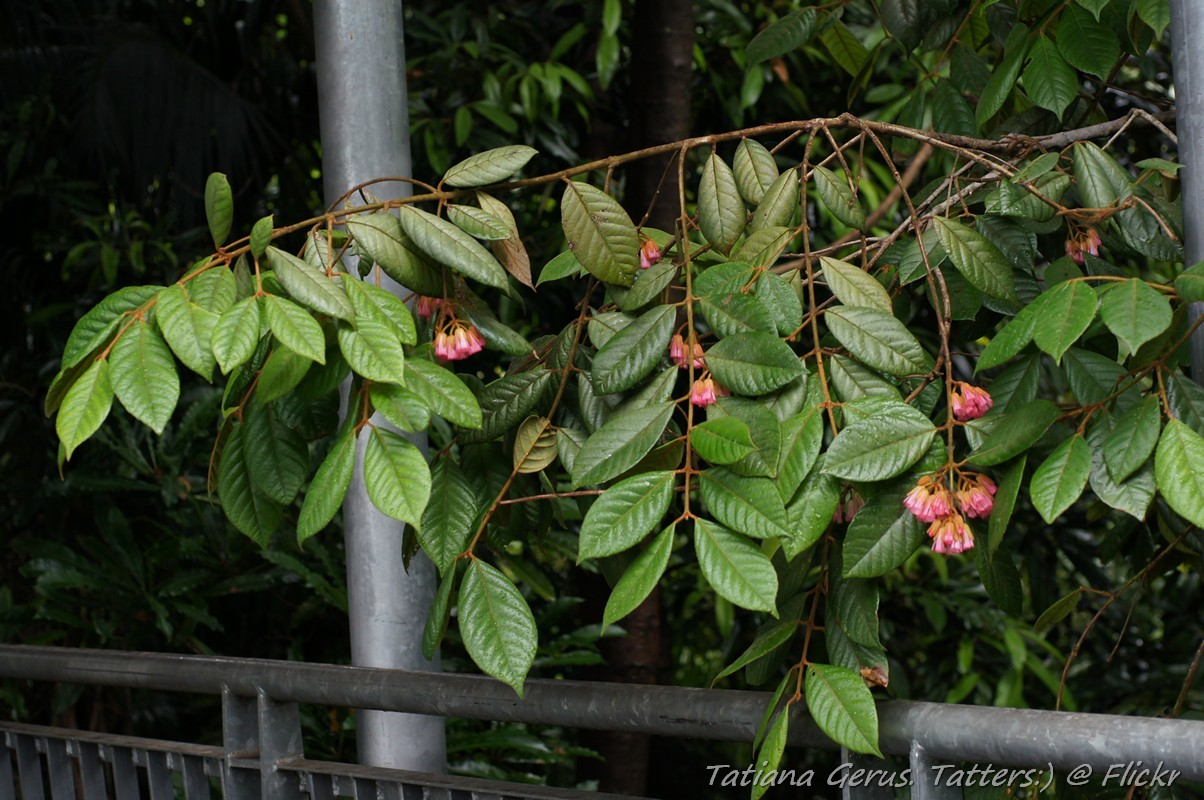

Scientific classification
- Kingdom: Plantae
- Clade: Tracheophytes
- Clade: Angiosperms
- Clade: Eudicots
- Clade: Rosids
- Order: Oxalidales
- Family: Elaeocarpaceae
- Genus: Aceratium
- Species: A. ferrugineum

Binomial name
- Aceratium ferrugineum C.T.White

= Aceratium ferrugineum =

Species of tree

Aceratium ferrugineum is a species of medium-sized trees, commonly known as rusty carabeen, constituting part of the plant family Elaeocarpaceae. They are endemic to the Wet Tropics of Queensland in Australia.

Aceratium ferrugineum only grows in luxuriant, mature, mountain rainforests on the Mount Carbine Tableland between Black Mountain and Mount Spurgeon, and on Mount Lewis.

== Description ==
Mature trees have fluted trunks and grow to 30 m (100 ft) tall. The leaves occur opposite each other, when new have dense rusty hairs all over them which persist on the underside and the top midrib, and measure 7.5 cm–16 cm × 3.5 cm–7.5 cm (3.0 in–6.3 in × 1.4 in–3.0 in). Near the ends of new growing branches grow racemes of pink flowers, each approximately 20 mm (0.8 in) long. They produce bunches of yellow–orange–red, oval shaped fruits measuring 30 mm–45 mm × 18 mm–28 mm (1.18 in–1.77 in × 0.71 in–1.10 in). Their fibrous ripe flesh smells like ripe watermelon.
