= Agriculture in Mauritius =

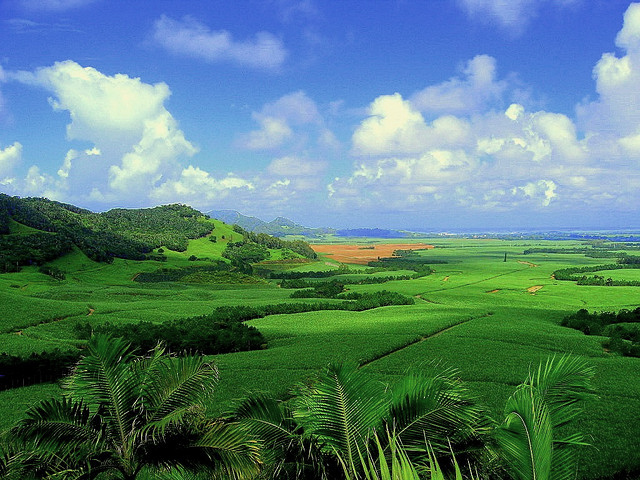
A sugarcane plantation in Mauritius.

Agriculture is a major industry in Mauritius. Historically, sugarcane cultivation has been the main agricultural activity in Mauritius. In 2001 it accounted for close to 70% of the nation's cultivated land which was approximately 36% of the country's total land area. The Mauritius Chamber of Agriculture was founded in 1853. The Faculty of Agriculture at the University of Mauritius was founded in 1914. Mauritius is a net food importer, with an overall self-sufficiency ratio of 25%. This caused major economic stress after the 2008 financial crisis. Mauritius became the 15th member of the Common Market for Eastern and Southern Africa (COMESA) to sign its national Comprehensive Africa Agriculture Development Programme (CAADP) Compact. In 2023, the principal agricultural products by tonnage were sugarcane, chicken, pumpkins (squash), tomatoes and eggs. Agriculture is the responsibility of the Ministry of Agro Industry and Food Security in the Government of Mauritius. The current minister is Arvin Boolell. Mauritius has relied on agro-chemicals in their agriculture for many years. The Smart Agriculture Project has been supported by the European Union since 2018.

== See also ==
- Sugar industry of Mauritius
