= Mark James Elgar Coode =

English botanist (1937–2025)

- Born: 1937; Plymouth, England
- Died: 4 October 2025 (aged 87–88)
- Occupation: botanist

Academic background
- Education: University of Cambridge

Academic work
- Institutions: University of Edinburgh, Royal Botanic Garden, Edinburgh, Forest Department of Lae, Royal Botanic Gardens, Kew

Mark James Elgar Coode (1937 – 4 October 2025) was a British botanist, taxonomic author and authority in the field of Elaeocarpaceae.

== Biography ==
=== Early life and education ===
Mark Coode was born in Plymouth, England and spent part of his childhood in India owing to his father's work at the Bengal Nagpur Railway Company. In the late 1950s, while studying at Cambridge, he joined an undergraduate expedition with the Institute for Scientific Research in Central Africa (IRSAC) in the Lake Kivu region. He continued his studies after returning from the Congo in 1959, and graduated with a BA in 1961.

=== Career ===
From Cambridge, Coode moved to the University of Edinburgh, starting as an assistant to Peter Hadland Davis on the Flora of Turkey project, funded by the Science Research Council and based at the Royal Botanic Garden, Edinburgh. His research included two scientific expeditions to Turkey in 1962 and 1965. James Cullen, who had recently completed his PhD research at the University of Liverpool, was an early collaborator on the project; the pair were taxonomic co-authors of several plants (for example Abies nordmanniana subsp. equi-trojani).

In 1966, he was appointed senior botanist in the Botanical Division of the Forest Department of Lae, Papua Niugini, a role that allowed him to collect and study several plant species of the mainland of PNG and of New Ireland, New Britain, New Hanover and Bougainville Island. This research led him to author a forest manual on Combretaceae and work on the Melanesian Terminalia. It was during this period that Coode began his life's study of the south-eastern representatives of five genera of Elaeocarpaceae that together comprise a few hundred species. The research on Elaeocarpaceae, begun in 1968, continued after his departure from PNG in September 1972, with contributions to volumes one and two of the handbook Flora of Papua New Guinea and numerous subsequent publications.

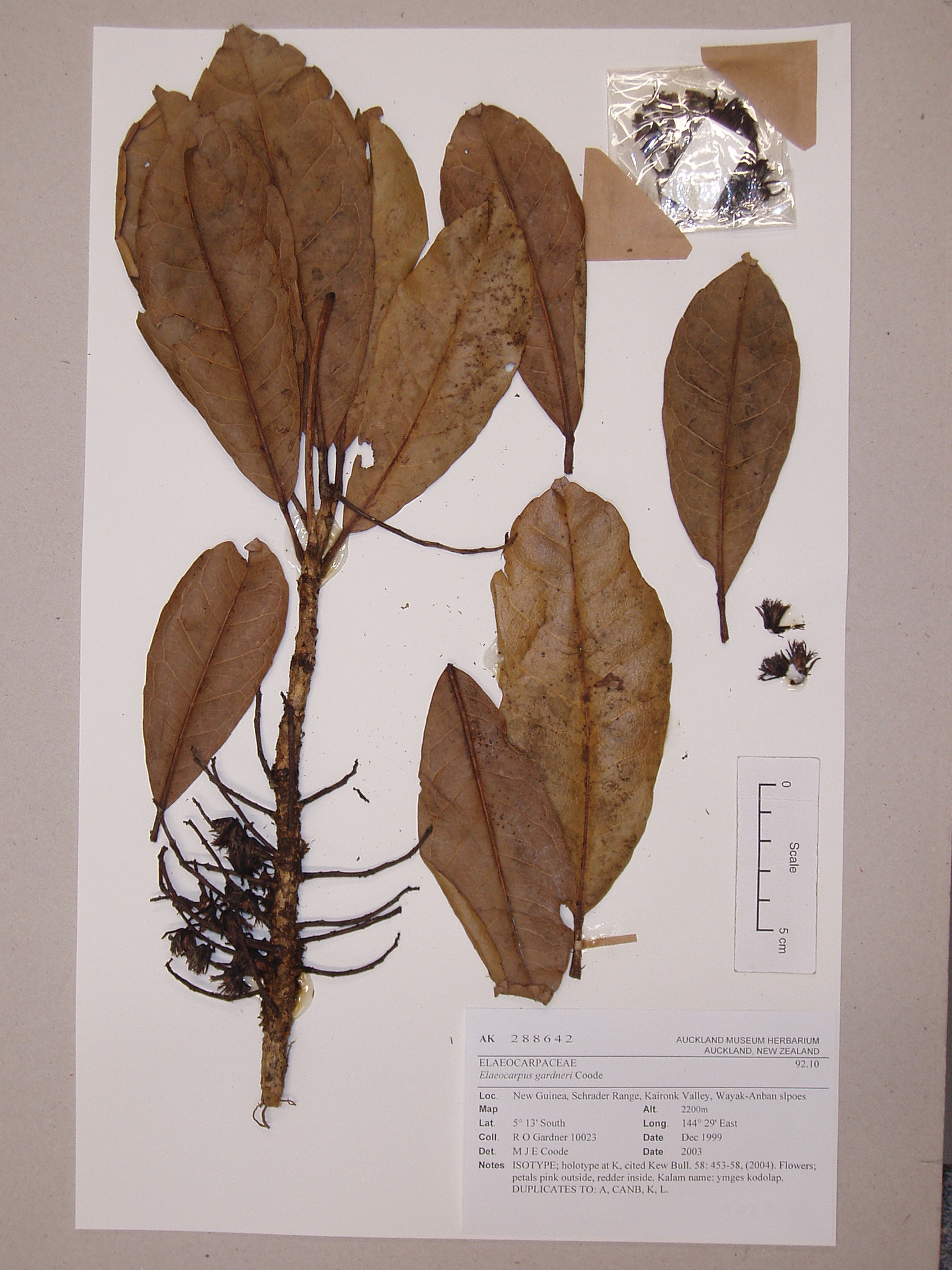
Elaeocarpus gardneri Coode (AM AK288642-2)

On his return to the United Kingdom in 1972, Coode took up a new role at Kew. He was appointed the first taxonomist to work on Flore des Mascareignes project, a collaboration with the French Overseas Scientific and Technical Research Office (ORSTOM). He was appointed Principal Scientific Officer of the herbarium at the Royal Botanic Gardens, Kew, a position he held until 1997. From 1977 until 1990, he edited the Kew Bulletin. He left that role to work on the Brunei Handbook project.

His work at Kew took him on extensive collection trips to Mauritius (including Rodrigues) and la Reunion, and throughout south-east Asia, including the Philippines in 1986, Sulawesi in 1989, and to Brunei in the 1990s. He continued his association with New Guinea with trips to Western New Guinea in the 1990s. The collections can be found in the main herbaria of the respective countries as well as at Kew.

The International Plant Name Index currently lists over 200 plants published against his name between 1965 and 2024. Coode's work has been recognised by fellow botanists with at least nine eponymous taxa, including: Asparagus coodei; Astragalus coodei; Elaeocarpus coodei; Henckelia coodei; Mapania coodei; Melicope coodeana; Reseda coodei; Sericolea coodei; Weinmannia coodei. Since his ostensible retirement, he has continued his lifelong work on Elaeocarpaceae.

=== Personal life and death ===
Coode has five sons to his first wife, Caroline.He remarried a fellow botanist, Sandy Atkins, whose own work principally focuses on the taxonomy and classification of the verbena family.

Coode died on 4 October 2025, at the age of 87–88.

== Main works ==
- 1972. Notes on the Flora of Two Papuan Mountains. Papua and New Guinea Scientific Soc. Proc. 23. With Peter Francis Stevens. 8 pp.
- 1976. Notes on Pittosporaceae and Myrsinaceae of the Mascarenes. Kew Bulletin 31: 221–225.
- 1979. Further notes on Myrsinaceae in the Mascarene Islands. Kew Bulletin 34: 413–416.
- 1983. A Conspectus of Sloanea (Elaeocarpaceae) in the Old World. Kew Bulletin 38: 347–427.
- 1981. Myrsinacées. In: Bosser J, Cadet T, Guého J, Marais W, eds. Flore des Mascareignes. Kew: MSIRI, ORSTOM & RBG, 115, 1–25.
- 1996. A checklist of the flowering plants & gymnosperms of Brunci Darassalam. And the. de Ministry of Industry & Primary Res. 477 pp.
- 1965. Flora of Turkey and the East Aegean Islands ... With J. Cullen, Peter Hadland Davis. Ed. Univ. Press, 567 pp.
