= Sugar industry in Mauritius =

The growing of sugar cane has been the dominant industry of Mauritius for most of its inhabited period. The island was totally uninhabited when first discovered by the Portuguese in 1507. Sugar was introduced during the period of Dutch Mauritius (1638–1710) mostly to make Arak and slaves were imported to work on sugar cane and other crops. After about 1735, during the period of French Mauritius (1715–1810), under the French East India Company, the industry developed considerably. In 1735 there were 638 slaves in a population of 838 inhabitants. Thereafter, some 1,200 to 1,300 slaves arrived annually; within five years the number of slaves had quadrupled to 2,612 and the number of French had doubled.

Where the Dutch had failed, the French succeeded.

The island was invaded during the Napoleonic Wars, and in British Mauritius (1810–1968) sugar remained the mainstay of the economy. Slavery was gradually abolished over several years after 1833, and the planters ultimately received two million pounds sterling in compensation for the loss of their slaves, who had been imported from Africa and Madagascar during the French occupation. New labour was now mostly indentured labourers from India to work in the sugar cane fields. Between 1834 and 1921, around half a million indentured labourers were on the island. Production grew steadily, from 467 tons in 1812 to 140,000 tons in 1890, and 415,000 in 1949, although at intervals large cyclones and an introduced insect species set back production considerably.

The sugar magnates, mostly of French descent, dominated Mauritian civil life, until challenged in the 1910s in a period of political agitation. The rising middle class (made up of doctors, lawyers, and teachers) began to challenge the political power of the sugar cane landowners. Dr. Eugène Laurent, mayor of Port Louis, was the leader of this new group; his party, Action Libérale, demanded that more people should be allowed to vote in the elections. Action Libérale was opposed by the Parti de l'Ordre, led by Henri Leclézio, the most influential of the sugar magnates.

The 1914–1918 war was a period of great prosperity, due to a boom in sugar prices. In 1919, the Mauritius Sugar Syndicate came into being, which included 70% of all sugar producers. But in the years after the war prices slumped considerably and the power of the magnates was curtailed. Independence came in 1968, since when the economy has great diversified, with in 2019 raw sugar representing only 7.8 of exports, far less than textiles and clothing, and a good deal less than fish products.

== Dutch Occupation (1638-1710) ==
The first agricultural plant of economic importance to be introduced to Mauritius was sugar cane. From 1639 it was used on an artisanal basis by Dutch settlers primarily to produce an alcoholic beverage called arrack. Arrack is made of molasses, which is produced as a by-product when making sugar. The first organized sugar mill on the island appears to have been that of the Wilhems brothers at the center of the island, under Governor Issac Johannes Lamotius (1677-1692). Under Governor Roelof Deodati (1692 -1703), the production of sugar was successfully extended with the arrival of a surgeon, Jean Boekelberg on board the ship Standvastighied. Boekelberg had studied the sugar industry in Surinam and successfully used his knowledge within this fledgling industry. de Sornay, Pierre (1952). Isle de France,Mauritius island.

The Dutch abandoned Mauritius on 17 February 1710.

== French Occupation (1710-1810) ==
Bertrand-François Mahé de La Bourdonnais (1737 -1745) was the first French Governor to make a long-lasting impact on Mauritius and is considered by some as the real founder of Mauritius as a French colony. He encouraged the growth of sugar cane and created the infrastructure necessary for its extension throughout the colony. He imported the necessary new technology to make the industry more efficient. During his governorship, the first modern sugar mills for the era were commissioned. These were the Rosalie-Villebague mill in Pamplemousse in 1745 and the mill at Grande Riviere Sud Est in Ferney.

== British Occupation (1810-1968) ==
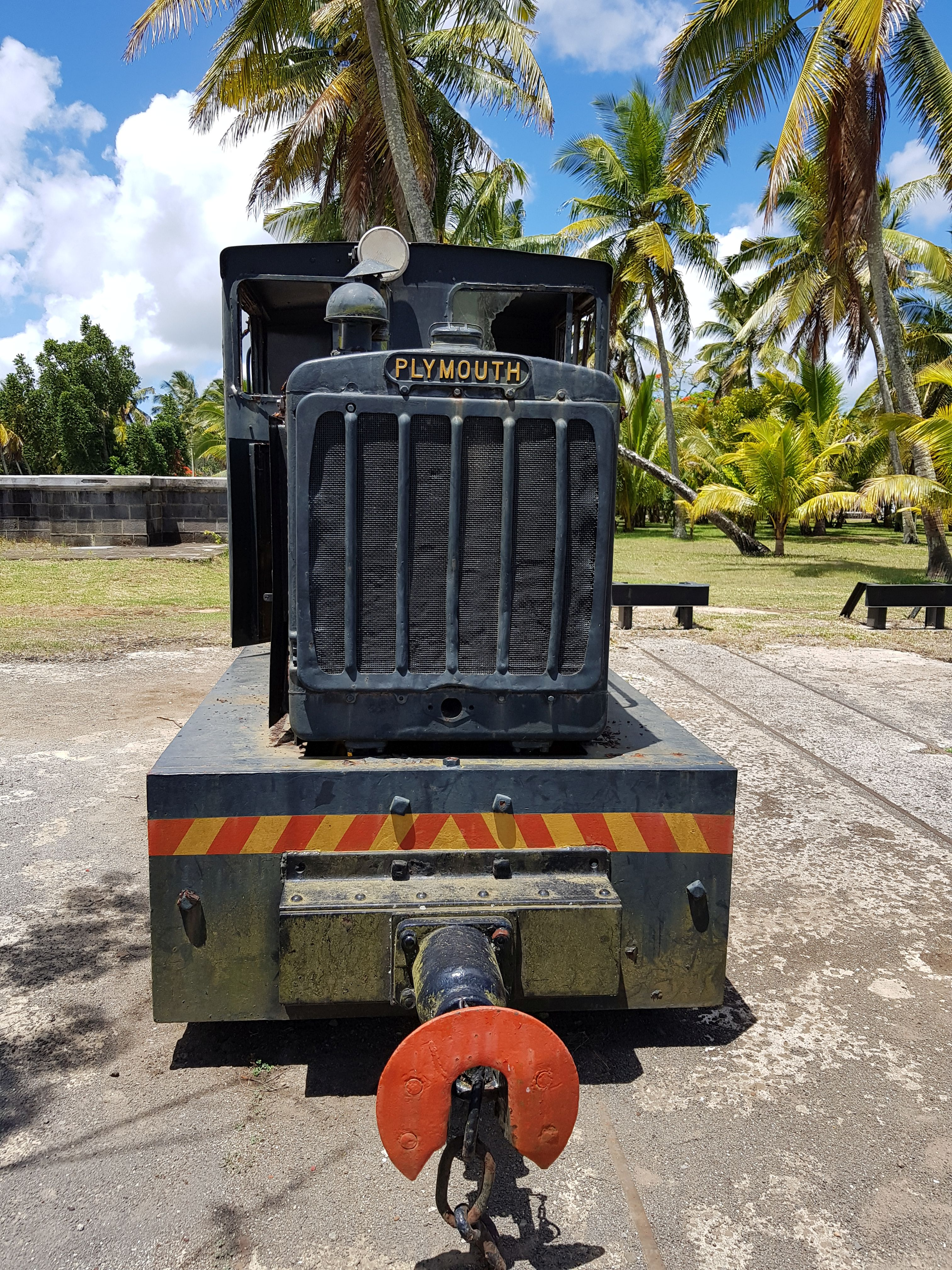

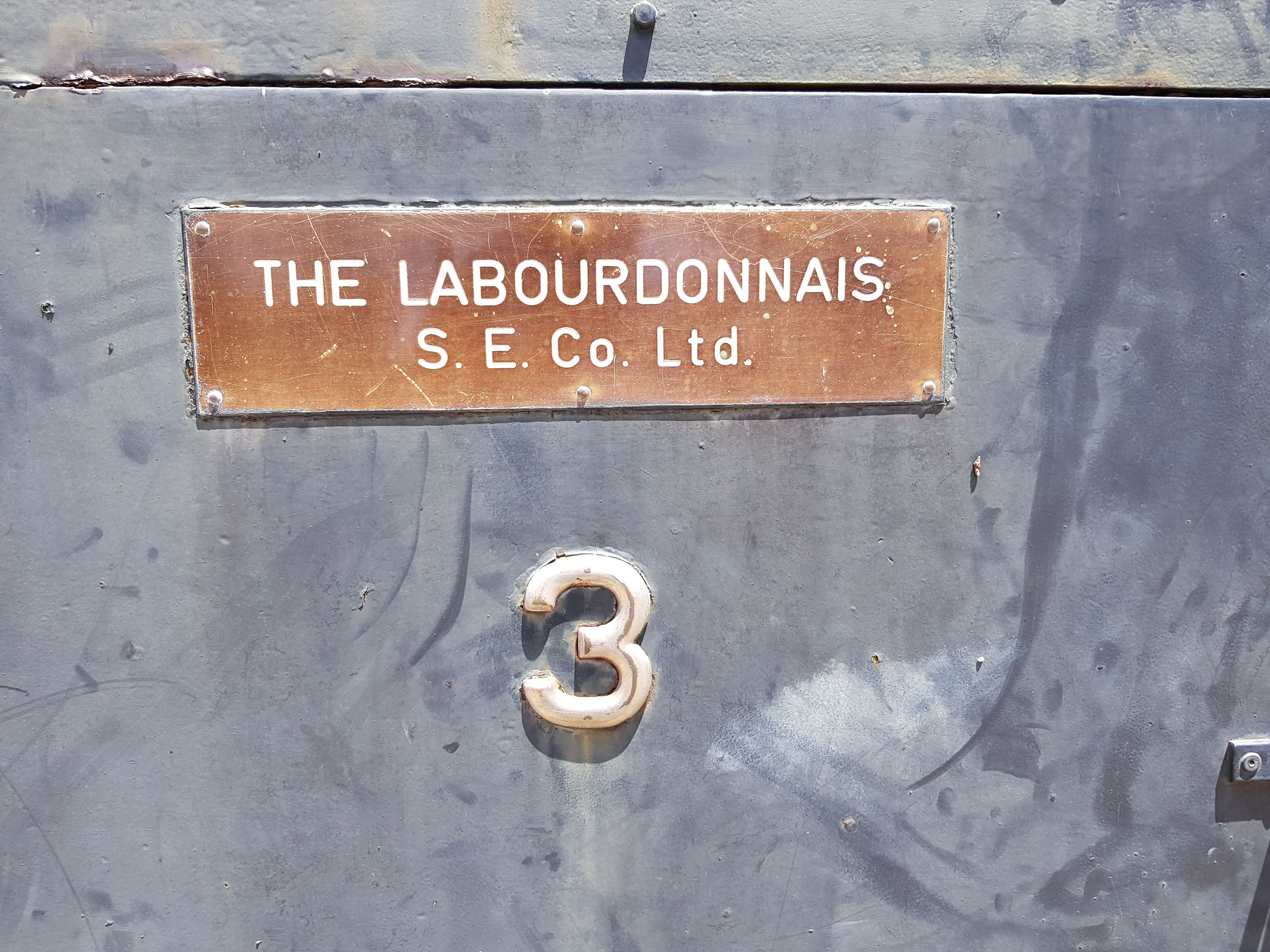

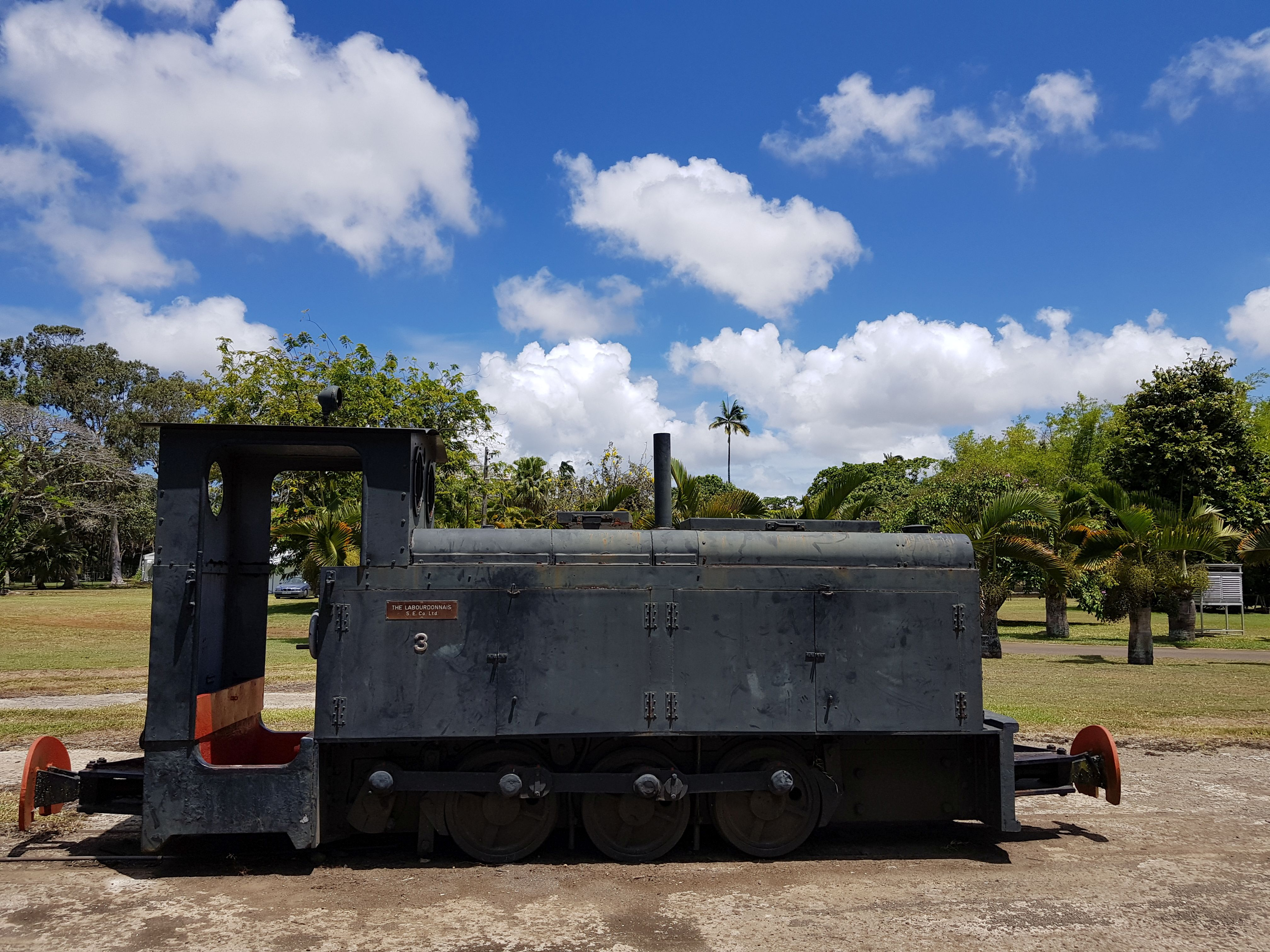

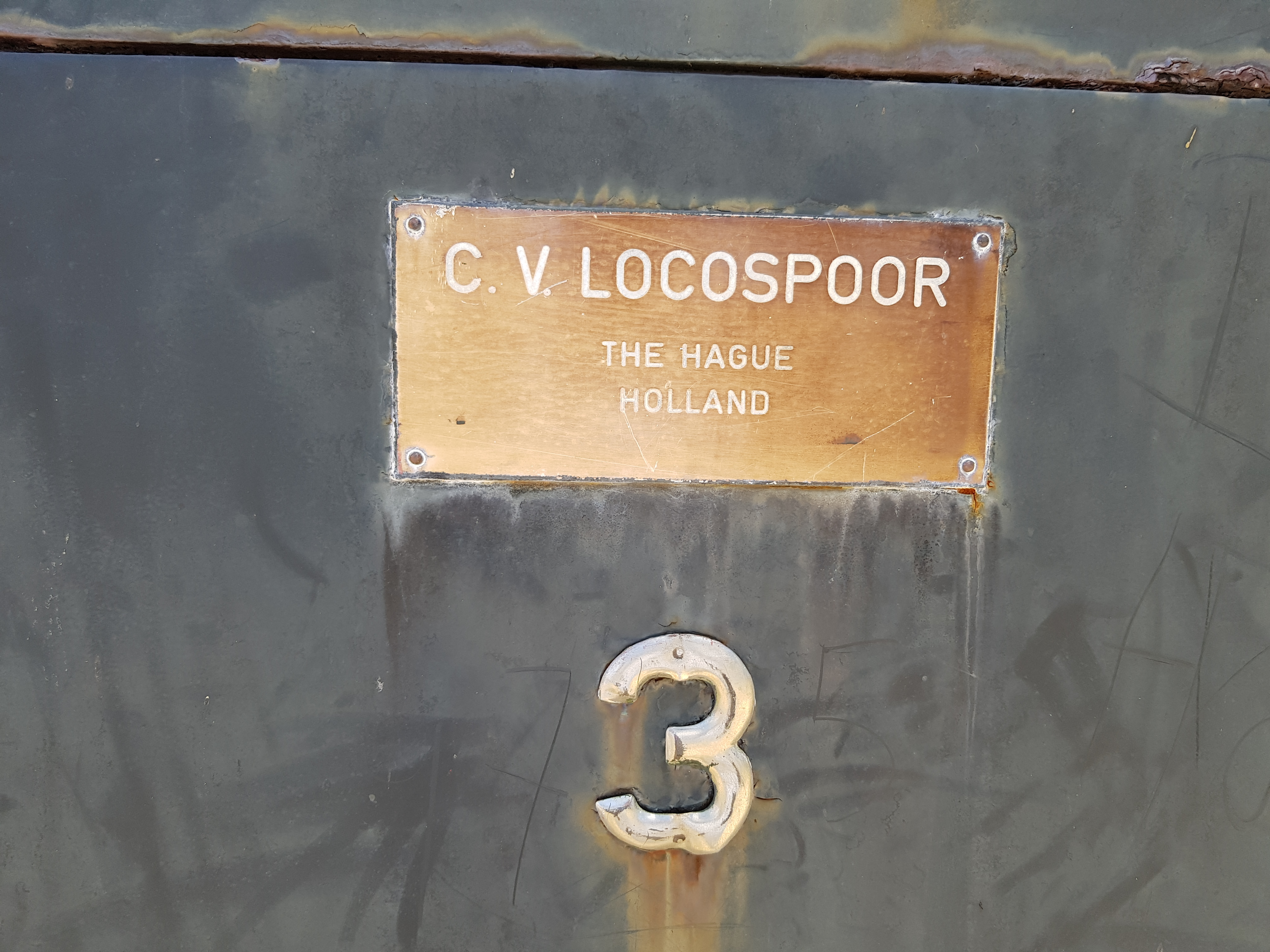

British Mauritius, with Robert Townsend Farquhar as the first governor, brought about rapid social and economic changes. One of the most important was the abolition of slavery on 1 February 1835. The planters received a compensation of two million pounds sterling for the loss of their slaves, who had been imported from Africa and Madagascar during the French occupation. The number of Mauritius Sugar Mills grew, as did their efficiency with the introduction of new technology, as competition became fierce. This led to the consolidation of the entire industry after 1860 when the number of operating mills decreased from 296 units to 30 in 1947. Source: Mauritius Blue Book, L'Almanach de Maurice de Sornay, Pierre (1952). Isle de France, Ile Maurice pp367.

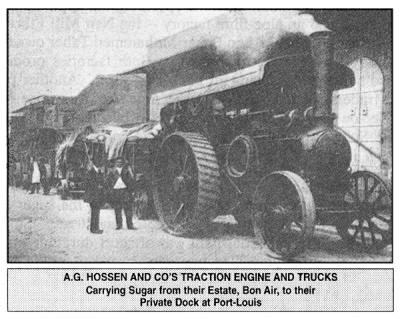
Sugar Estate Tractor 1901

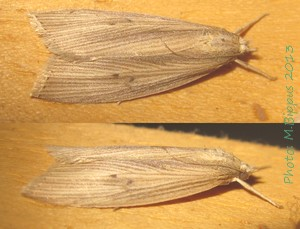
Chilo sacchariphagus ssp. sacchariphagus

Sugar Yields
Year	Yield- %	Mills
1825	6.00	157
1835	6.75	186
1840	7.10	217
1850	7.60	228
1860	8.10	296
1870	8.20	241
1880	8.30	178
1890	8.70	110
1900	10.10	85
1910	10.63	64
1920	10.76	56
1930	10.74	42
1940	11.45	38
1944	11.31	35
1947	12.50	30

Between 1812 and 1949, Mauritius Sugar Mills production increased from 467 tons to over 400.000 tons per annum despite cyclones and the accidental introduction, in 1850, of the Chilo sacchariphagus sacchariphagus from Java which devastated the sugar cane crop. 31 species of parasitoids were imported to combat the Chilo sacchariphagus sacchariphagus. Only two became established (Trichogramma australicum and Cotesia flavipes)

Sugar Production
Year	Tons
1812	467
1820	7,485
1830	32,750
1840	39,559
1850	55,154
1860	131,049
1890	140,000
1910	215,000
1930	235,000
1935	280,500
1940	316,250
1949	415,000

Source: Mauritius Blue Book, L'Almanach de Maurice de Sornay, Pierre (1952). Isle de France, Ile Maurice pp367.

Mauritius is situated in what has been called 'Cyclone Alley' and these sometimes played a determining part in the annual production of sugar. Of note and on record were:

- The April 1892 Mauritius cyclone (1200 deaths - 50,000 homeless). Sugar production fell 42%. A third of the city of Port Louis was destroyed in a few hours
- Cyclone Alix (19 January 1960). Cyclone Alix struck in February 1960. The island suffered winds of 160 km/h to 200 km/h for 20 hours.
- Cyclone Carol (28 February 1960). The eye of Carol passed directly over Mauritius and it is assumed to be the most powerful cyclone ever recorded in the South-West Indian Ocean with wind gusts of 160 km/h to 256 km/h. It made 300,000 people homeless and destroyed 40% of the Mauritian main economy which, at that time, was the sugar cane crop. 42 deaths were recorded
- Cyclone Jenny (27–28 February 1962) On 27 February 1962, the cyclone passed 30 km off the north coast of Mauritius with a maximum wind speed of 235 km/h, causing 14 deaths, injuring hundreds and leaving 8,000 homeless. Considerable damage was caused to the North of the island.

From 1951, Sugar was exported and sold under the Commonwealth Sugar Agreement.

In 1953, The Mauritius Sugar Industry Research Institute (MSIRI), was founded "to promote by means of research and investigation the technical progress of the sugar industry".

=== Independence - 1968 ===
In the 60's there were 25 operating sugar mills. As from 1975, sugar was exported and traded under the Sugar Protocol signed between the EU and the ACP countries where Mauritius had an annual quota of 507,000 tonnes of raw sugar at a guaranteed price. The quota allocated to Mauritius was the largest amongst ACP countries (African, Caribbean and Pacific Group of States) and represented about 35 per cent of the total allocation.

- 1990: 19 sugar mills were in production.
- 1996: 17 sugar mills were in production.
- 2003: 11 sugar mills were in production.

The EU Sugar Protocol ended in 2009. The price of sugar fell by 36 percent between 2006 and 2010. In May 1997, the government produced a plan to rationalise the sugar sector by centralising production around fewer mills and offering an accompanying package to employees and planters.

- 2020: 3 sugar mills were in production.

== How the Sugar Industry Paved The Way for the 'Mauritian Miracle' ==
"Scholars increasingly agree that the ‘Mauritian Miracle’ was enabled by the country's significant level of state capacity." Since independence, the so-called "Mauritian Miracle” and the “success of Africa” (Romer, 1992; Frankel, 2010; Stiglitz, 2011) was partially based in state reforms since 1825 when sugar factory owners within the Sugar industry of Mauritius pressured colonial officials to:-

- Regulate and better control the island's labor supply
- Improve the country's transportation infrastructure
- Undertake national Research and Development initiatives.

These efforts collectively assisted the island's initial growth as a monoculture-based economy but also laid the pillars of multiethnic social stability that anchored and then powered the country's successful economic diversification after independence.

== See also ==
- Agriculture in Mauritius
- List of sugar mills in Mauritius
- Intercontinental Slavery Museum
