= Pierre De Sornay =

Agronomist, historian

Marie Joseph Pierre de Sornay (born Port Louis, Mauritius October 11, 1876 – died Curepipe, Mauritius August 5, 1968) was a Mauritian agronomist and writer.

Sornay was awarded the Chevalier de la Légion d'honneur in 1934, the Officier de la Légion d'honneur in 1956, and the Commandeur du Mérite agricole in 1966. He wrote the book Isle De France-Ile Maurice, which was awarded the Prix Thorlet by the Académie française.
