= List of television channels in Mauritius =

This is a list of television stations in Mauritius, available on digital terrestrial, satellite, internet streaming and cable systems.

== Governmental television ==
- MBC 1
- MBC 2
- MBC 3
- MBC 4
- MBC Sat
- Senn Kreol
- YSTV
- Ciné 12
- Bhojpuri Channel
- Kids Channel (Closed in 2015)
- BBC News
- DD National (Indian Governmental Channel)
- DD India (Indian Governmental Channel)
- DD Podhigai (Indian Governmental Channel)
- DD Sahyadri (Indian Governmental Channel)
- DD Saptagiri (Indian Governmental Channel)
- DD Urdu (Indian Governmental Channel)
- Zoom (Indian)

== IP television ==
=== My.T (IPTV) ===
- NW Sport 1
- NW Sport 2
- NW Sport 3
- NW Sport 4
- NW Sport 6
- NW Sport 7
- LFC TV
- L'Equipe TV
- MGG TV
- Star Gold
- Sony Max
- B4U Movies
- StarPlus
- Star Bharat
- Colors Rishtey
- Colors
- Sony Entertainment Television
- MTV India
- Sony SAB
- B4U Music
- Zing
- Zee TV
- Zee Cinema
- Tiji TV
- Boomerang
- Cartoon Network
- Gulli
- Warner TV Next
- Nickelodeon
- Comedy Central
- TF1
- M6
- W9
- Téva
- 6ter
- Warner TV
- TMC
- TFX
- RTL9
- Nina Novelas
- OCS
- Cine+ Frisson
- Cine+ Emotion
- Cine+ Family
- TCM Cinema
- TF1 Séries Film
- Ushuaia TV
- National Geographic
- Nat Geo Wild
- CGTN Documentary
- Histore TV
- RFM TV
- DBM
- NDTV Good Times
- France 1
- France 2
- France 3
- France 4
- France 5
- Franceinfo
- NHK World Japan
- DW-TV
- LCI
- CNN International
- Bloomberg Television
- France 24 English
- France 24 Français
- NDTV Profit
- NDTV
- TRT World
- India Today
- ARY Digital
- Vijay TV
- Jaya TV
- CCTV-4
- CGTN French
- MBC HD
- MBC 1
- MBC 2
- MBC 3
- MBC 4
- MBC 5
- MBC 6
- MBC 7
- MBC 8
- MBC 9
- MBC 10
- MBC 11
- MBC 12
- MBC 13
- MBC 15
- MBC 16
- MBC 17
- Parliament TV

== Online private television ==
- ION News
- Teleplus
- TopTV Mauritius
- L'Express
- MBC Web TV

== External television ==
=== Canalsat ===
- 13EME RUE
- ACTION
- ANTENNE REUNION
- BBC WORLD
- C8
- CANAL+ CINEMA HD
- CANAL+ FAMILY HD
- CANAL+ HD
- CANAL+ SERIES HD
- CANAL+ SPORT 2 HD
- CANAL+ SPORT 3 HD
- CANAL+ SPORT HD
- CANAL EVENEMENT
- CINE+ CLASSIC
- CINE+ CLUB
- CINE+ EMOTION
- CINE+ FAMIZ
- CINE+ FRISSON
- CINE+ PREMIER HD
- COLORS
- COMEDIE+
- CSTAR
- DISCOVERY CHANNEL
- DISCOVERY SCIENCE
- DISNEY CHANNEL
- DISNEY CINEMA HD
- DISNEY JUNIOR
- DISNEY XD
- ELLE GIRL
- ENGLISH CLUB TV
- EQUIDIA LIVE
- EURONEWS
- EUROSPORT 1 HD
- EUROSPORT 2
- GAME ONE
- HISTOIRE
- i TELE
- INFOSPORT+
- IQRAA
- KANAL AUSTRAL
- KOMBAT SPORT
- KTO
- LCI
- LCP
- LIVING FOODZ
- M6 HD
- MBC SAT
- MCM
- MEZZO
- MTV
- MTV HITS
- MTV INDIA
- MUTV
- NAT GEO WILD HD
- NATIONAL GEOGRAPHIC HD
- NBA TV
- NICKELODEON
- NOVELAS TV
- NRJ12
- OCS CHOC
- OCS CITY
- OCS GEANTS
- OCS MAX HD
- ORTC
- PARAMOUNT HD
- PARIS PREMIERE
- PIWI+
- PLANETE+ A&E
- PLANETE+ CI
- PLANETE+ HD
- REUNION 1ERE
- RFM TV
- RTL9
- RUGBY+
- SEASONS
- SERIE CLUB
- Sony MAX
- STAR Gold
- STAR Plus
- SYFY
- TELE KREOL
- TELETOON+
- TEST
- TEVA
- TF1 HD
- TIMES NOW
- TMC
- TRACE TROPICAL
- TRACE URBAN
- TV BREIZH
- TVM
- USHUAIA TV HD
- VOYAGE
- W9
- Zee Cinema
- ZEE TAMIL
- Zee TV
- ZING

== See also ==
- MBC 1 (Mauritian TV channel)
- MBC 2 (Mauritian TV channel)
- MBC 3 (Mauritian TV channel)
- Kids Channel (Mauritian TV channel)
- List of newspapers in Mauritius
- List of radio stations in Mauritius
- List of television stations in Africa
- Media of Mauritius
