= Geography of Mauritius =

Mauritius
Native name: Moris Nickname: The Star and Key of the Indian Ocean
- Location of Mauritius

Geography
- Location: Indian Ocean
- Coordinates: 20°17′S 57°33′E
- Archipelago: Mascarene Islands
- Area: 2,040 km^{2} (790 sq mi)
- Highest elevation: 828 m (2717 ft)
- Highest point: Piton de la Petite Rivière Noire

Administration
- Mauritius
- Largest settlement: Port Louis (pop. 147,688)

Demographics
- Population: 1,264,866 (2007)
- Pop. density: 616/km^{2} (1595/sq mi)
- Ethnic groups: Indo-Mauritian 68%, Mauritian Creole people 27%, Sino-Mauritian 3%, Franco-Mauritian 2%

Mauritius is an island off Africa's southeast coast located in the Indian Ocean, east of Madagascar. It is geologically located within the Somali Plate.

== Statistics ==
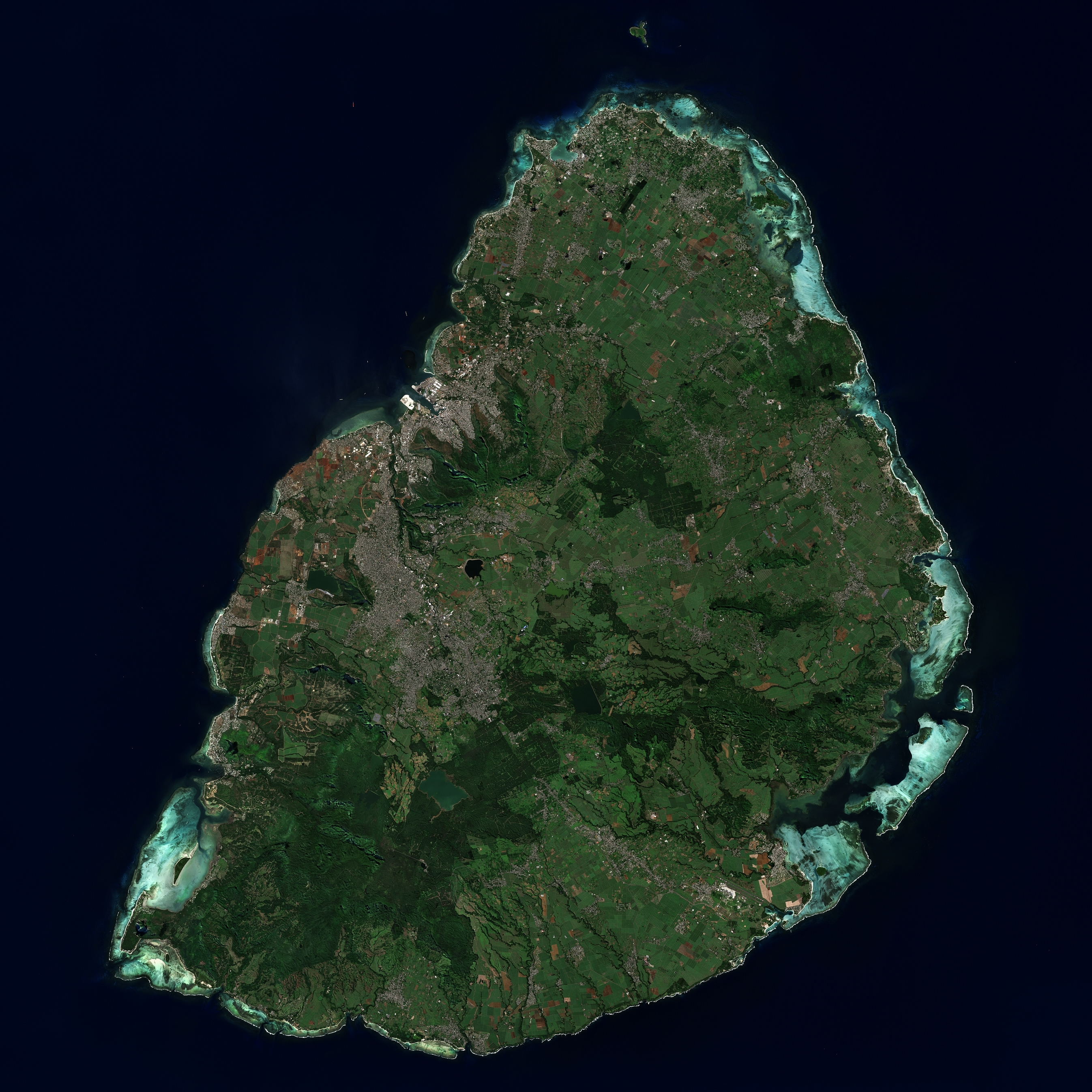
Satellite image of Mauritius

Area (includes Agaléga, Cargados Carajos (St. Brandon), and Rodrigues):
total: 2,040 km^{2}
land: 2,030 km^{2}
water: 10 km^{2}
note: includes Agalega Islands, Cargados Carajos Shoals (St. Brandon), and Rodrigues.

Coastline: 177 km

Maritime claims: territorial sea: 12 nmi (22.2 km; 13.8 mi)
continental shelf: 200 nmi (370.4 km; 230.2 mi) or to the edge of the continental margin
exclusive economic zone: 200 nmi (370.4 km; 230.2 mi)

Elevation extremes:
lowest point: Indian Ocean 0 m
highest point: Piton de la Petite Rivière Noire 828 m

Natural resources: arable land, fish

Land use:
arable land: 38.24%
permanent crops: 1.96%
other: 59.80% (2011)

Irrigated land: 212.2 km^{2} (2003)

Total renewable water resources: 2.75 km^{3} (2011)

Environment - current issues: water pollution, degradation of coral reefs, overfishing (Mauritius), sea wreck pollution (Cargados Carajos Shoals), Illegal, unreported and unregulated fishing by foreign, primarily Taiwanese commercial vessels and Mauritian Fishing Cooperatives, invasive alien species, illegal net fishing in the St. Brandon Lagoon by unlicenced, non resident fishing operators.

Environment - international agreements:
party to: Antarctic-Marine Living Resources, Biodiversity, Climate Change, Climate Change-Kyoto Protocol, Desertification, Endangered Species, Environmental Modification, Hazardous Wastes, Law of the Sea, Marine Life Conservation, Ozone Layer Protection, Ship Pollution, Wetlands

Geography - note: The main island is from which the country derives its name, former home of the dodo, a large flightless bird related to pigeons, driven to extinction by the end of the 17th century through a combination of hunting and the introduction of predatory species.

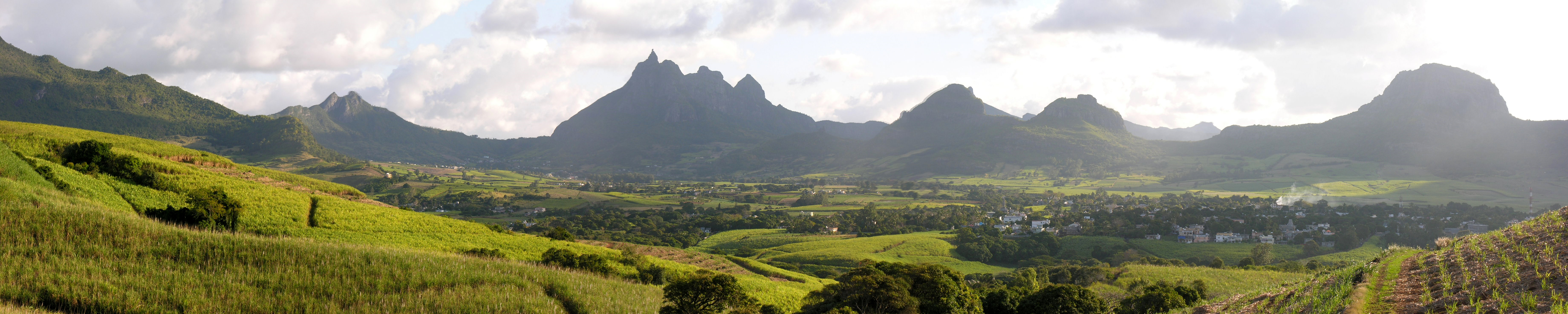
Landscape near Les Mariannes.

== Table of Islands ==
| Island | Capital | Other Cities | Area (km^{2}) | Population |
|---|---|---|---|---|
| Agalega Islands | Vingt-Cinq | La Fourche, St Rita, Port St James | 26.0 | 290 |
| Cargados Carajos | Île Raphael | Avocaré Island, L'île du Sud, L'Île Coco, L'île du Gouvernement | 3.2 | 63 |
| Islets of Mauritius | Port Louis | | 1871 | 1252980 |
| Ile aux Benitiers | Ile aux Benitiers | | 0.7 | 10 |
| Île aux Cerfs | Le Touessrok Resort | | 1.2 | 0 |
| Ile des Deux Cocos | Deux Cocos Resort | | 0.04 | 2 |
| Mauritius Island | Port Louis | Beau-Bassin Rose-Hill, Quatre Bornes, Vacoas-Phoenix, Curepipe | 1860 | 1252964 |
| More Mauritius Islands | Ile aux Aigrettes | Ronde Island, Ile de la Passe, Coin du Mire, Ile D’Ambre, Ile Plate, Ilot Gabriel, Grand Port Islets, Ile aux Serpents, Ile de L’Est | 8.8 | 1 |
| Islets of Rodrigues | Port Mathurin | | 111 | 38167 |
| Ile Crabe Rodrigues | Port Crabe | | 0.4 | 2 |
| Rodrigues Island | Port Mathurin | Gabriel, Riviere Cocos, port south east | 109 | 38164 |
| More Rodrigues Islands | Ile aux Cocos | Ile Fregate, Ile aux Sables, Ile aux Chats, le Hermitage, Ile Gombrani | 1.36 | 1 |
| Mauritius | Port Louis | | 2011 | 1291500 |

notes: excludes Tromelin and other îles éparses

== Climate ==
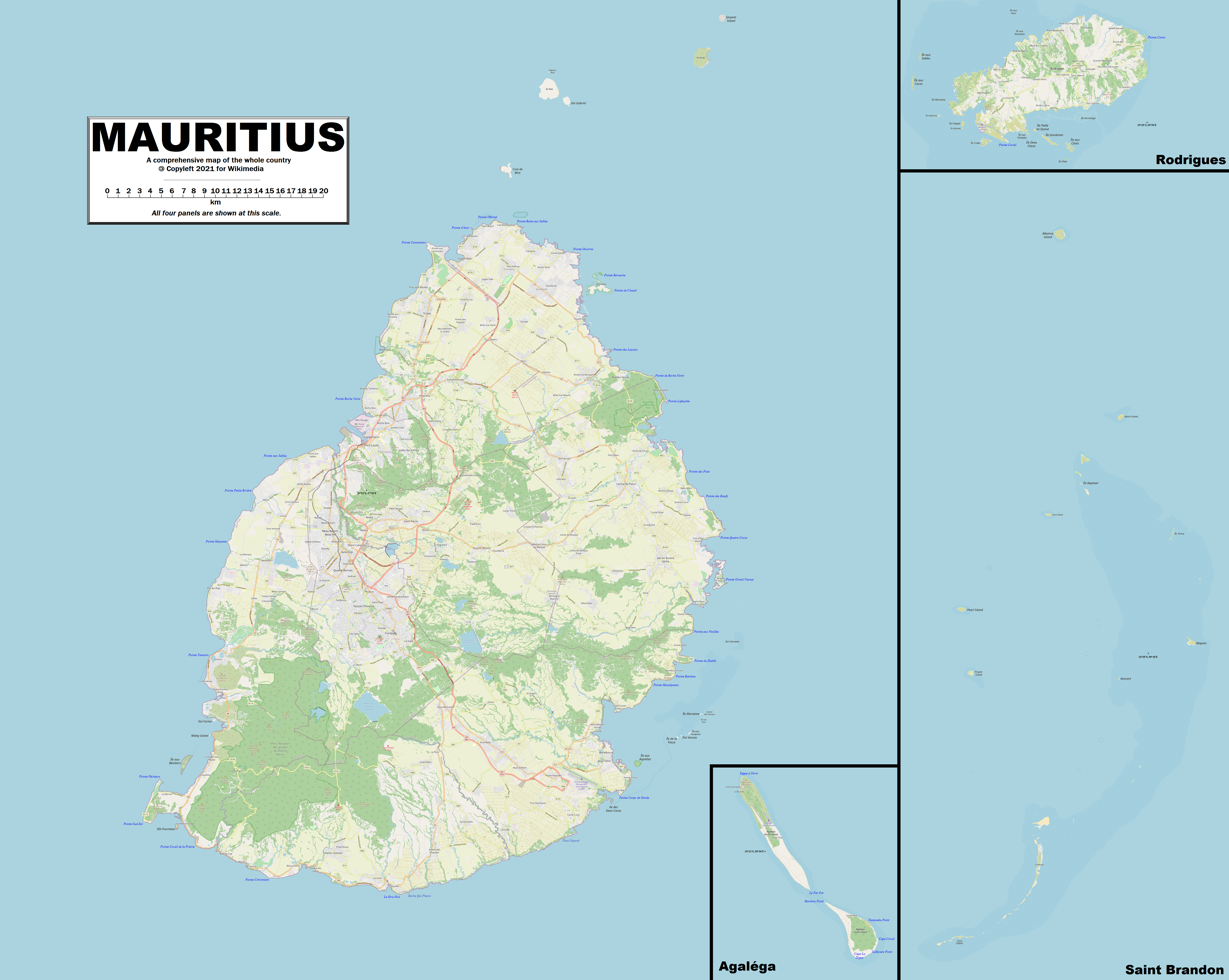
A comprehensive map of Mauritius, including the country's outlying islands

Situated near the Tropic of Capricorn, Mauritius has a tropical climate. There are 2 seasons: a warm humid summer from November to April, with a mean temperature of 24.7 °C (76.5 °F) and a cooler dry winter from June to September with a mean temperature of 20.4 °C (68.7 °F). The temperature difference between the seasons is only 4.3 °C (7.7 °F). The warmest months are January and February with average day maximum temperature reaching 29.2 °C (84.6 °F) and the coolest months are July and August with average overnight minimum temperatures of 16.4 °C (61.5 °F). Annual rainfall ranges from 900 mm (35 in) on the coast to 1,500 mm (59 in) on the central plateau. Although there is no marked rainy season, most of the rainfall occurs in the summer months. Sea temperature in the lagoon varies from 22–27 °C (72–81 °F). The central plateau is much cooler than the surrounding coastal areas and can experience as much as twice the rainfall. The prevailing trade winds keep the east side of the island cooler and bring more rain.

Occasional tropical cyclones generally occur between January and March and tend to disrupt the weather for about three days, bringing heavy rain. Anticyclones affect the country during May to September. Hollanda (1994) and Dina (2002) were the worst two recent cyclones to have affected the island.

Climate data for Port Louis
| Month | Jan | Feb | Mar | Apr | May | Jun | Jul | Aug | Sep | Oct | Nov | Dec | Year |
|---|---|---|---|---|---|---|---|---|---|---|---|---|---|
| Record high °C (°F) | 35 (95) | 33 (91) | 32 (90) | 31 (88) | 29 (84) | 28 (82) | 27 (81) | 27 (81) | 28 (82) | 31 (88) | 33 (91) | 35 (95) | 35 (95) |
| Mean daily maximum °C (°F) | 31.5 (88.7) | 31.4 (88.5) | 31.5 (88.7) | 30.7 (87.3) | 29.3 (84.7) | 27.6 (81.7) | 26.7 (80.1) | 26.8 (80.2) | 27.7 (81.9) | 28.8 (83.8) | 30.2 (86.4) | 31.1 (88.0) | 29.4 (85.0) |
| Mean daily minimum °C (°F) | 24.1 (75.4) | 24.0 (75.2) | 23.8 (74.8) | 23.0 (73.4) | 21.5 (70.7) | 19.9 (67.8) | 19.3 (66.7) | 19.1 (66.4) | 19.4 (66.9) | 20.4 (68.7) | 21.8 (71.2) | 23.2 (73.8) | 21.6 (70.9) |
| Record low °C (°F) | 17 (63) | 18 (64) | 17 (63) | 14 (57) | 13 (55) | 11 (52) | 11 (52) | 10 (50) | 11 (52) | 13 (55) | 14 (57) | 17 (63) | 10 (50) |
| Average rainfall mm (inches) | 131 (5.2) | 160 (6.3) | 83 (3.3) | 87 (3.4) | 48 (1.9) | 24 (0.9) | 18 (0.7) | 19 (0.7) | 17 (0.7) | 15 (0.6) | 24 (0.9) | 85 (3.3) | 711 (27.9) |
| Average rainy days (≥ 1.0 mm) | 9 | 10 | 8 | 7 | 6 | 4 | 4 | 5 | 3 | 3 | 3 | 6 | 68 |
| Mean monthly sunshine hours | 248 | 226 | 217 | 240 | 248 | 210 | 217 | 217 | 240 | 279 | 270 | 279 | 2,891 |
Source 1: World Meteorological Organization.
Source 2: BBC Weather

=== Climate change ===
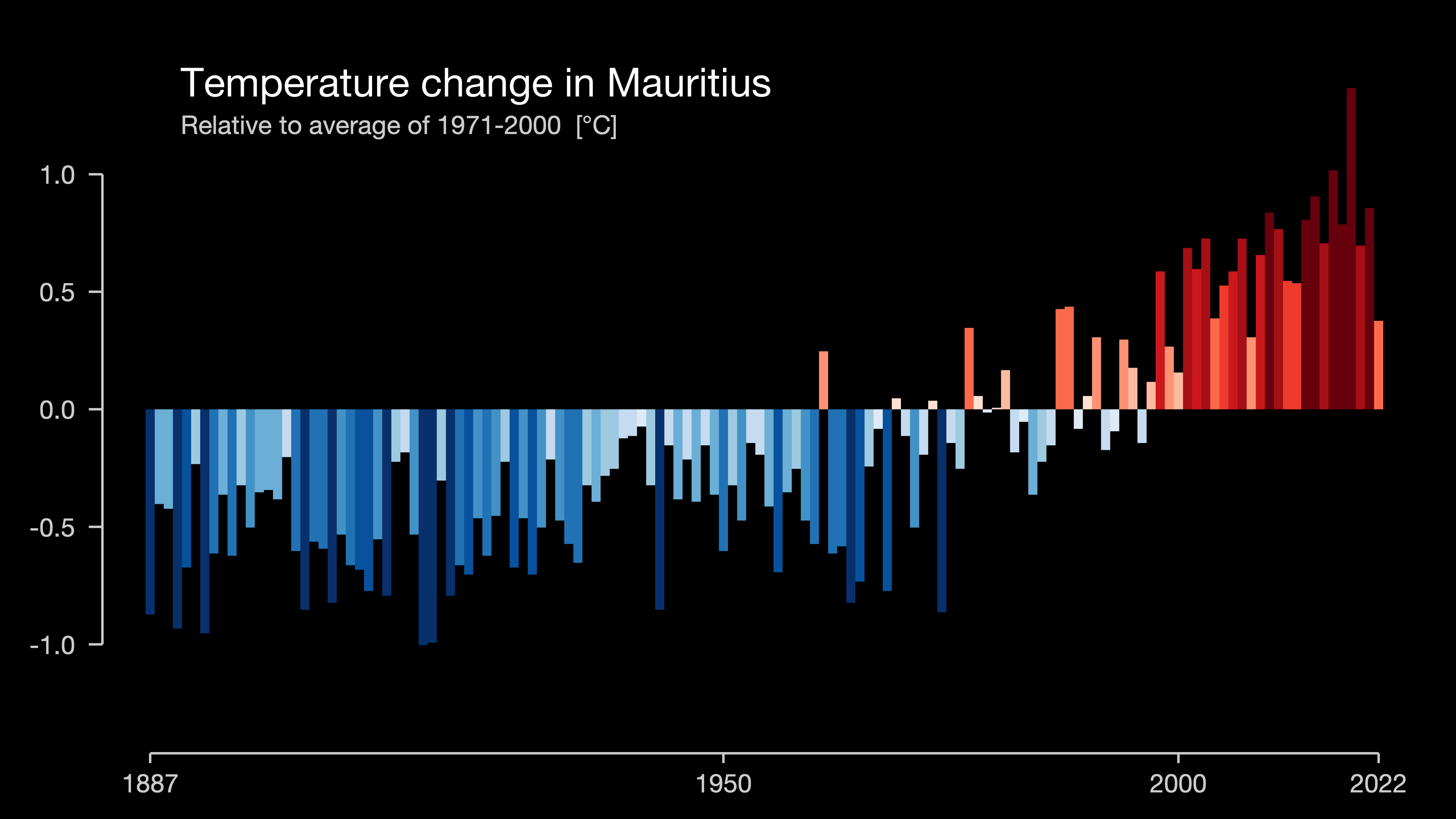
Temperature change in Mauritius, each bar represents the average temperature over that year.

Mauritius is increasingly vulnerable to climate change, facing rising temperatures, sea levels, and more frequent extreme weather events. The island faces stronger tropical cyclones, prolonged droughts, flash floods, landslides, and marine heatwaves which leading to coral bleaching. Coastal erosion, driven by rising sea levels, threatens infrastructure and freshwater supplies. Climate change is also impacting key sectors such as tourism and fisheries, with significant economic consequences. To adapt, Mauritius is implementing disaster preparedness measures, protecting coastal ecosystems like mangroves, and raising public awareness.

Mauritius contributes approximately 0.01% of global greenhouse gas emissions. The country has pledged to cut emissions by 40% by 2030 compared to projected levels without intervention, with a goal of reaching net zero by 2070. As part of its climate change strategy, Mauritius plans to eliminate coal from electricity generation by 2030, reduce landfill waste by diverting 70% of it through a circular economy approach, and increase the share of electric vehicles to 15% by the same year.

== Terrain ==
The country's landscape consists of a small coastal plain rising to discontinuous mountains encircling a central plateau. Mauritius is almost completely surrounded by reefs that may pose maritime hazards. The main island is of volcanic origin.

The mountains with the greatest prominence include:

- Piton de la Petite Rivière Noire, 828 m, the highest point of the island
- Le Morne Brabant, 556 m
- Tourelle de Tamarin, 563 m
- Corps de Garde, 720 m, prominence 382 m
- Le Pouce, 820 m, prominence 352 m
- Pieter Both, 820 m, prominence 229 m
- Montagne Cocotte, 780 m

== Extreme points ==
This is a list of the extreme points of Mauritius, the points that are farther north, south, east or west than any other location.

- Northernmost point – Tappe à Terre, North Island, Agaléga Islands
- Easternmost point – Trou d’Argent, Rodrigues Island
- Southernmost point - Le Gris Gris, Savanne District, Mauritius
- Westernmost point - North West Point, North Island, Agaléga Islands

== See also ==
- Outer islands of Mauritius
- Mascarene Islands
- St Brandon
- Avocaré Island
- L'île du Sud
- L'île du Gouvernement
- L'Île Coco
- L'île du Sud
- Avocaré Island
- L'île du Gouvernement
- Île Verronge
- Île Raphael
- Albatross Island, St. Brandon
- Mauritius
- Outer Islands of Mauritius
- St. Brandon
- List of national parks of Mauritius
- Mauritian Wildlife Foundation
