= Kids Channel (Mauritian TV channel) =

Television channel in Mauritius

MBC Kids Channel
- Country: Mauritius
- Broadcast area: National (Mauritius and Rodrigues)
- Network: Multi Carrier (Mauritius) Limited (MCML)
- Headquarters: Moka, Mauritius

Programming
- Languages: English, French
- Picture format: 576i for SDTV; 1080i for HDTV

Ownership
- Owner: Mauritius Broadcasting Corporation
- Sister channels: MBC 1 MBC 2 MBC 3 MBC 4 MBC Sat; YSTV; Ciné 12; Senn Kreol; Bhojpuri Channel

History
- Launched: 18 September 2007
- Closed: 31 January 2015
- Former names: Knowledge Channel (18 September 2007 to 15 September 2014)

Links
- Website: MBC website Kids Channel web page (archived from the Wayback Machine)

Kids Channel, previously known as Knowledge Channel (2007–2014), was a free-to-air cartoon television channel in Mauritius operated by the Mauritius Broadcasting Corporation (MBC), the national state broadcaster. Launched as the Knowledge Channel on 18 September 2007, it primarily broadcast cartoons, anime, teen sitcoms, game shows, and children's educational TV series in both English and French. On 15 September 2014, MBC renamed the channel to Kids Channel. At a certain time, the frequency went on live streaming of TV5Monde. The channel ceased operations on 31 January 2015 as part of MBC's broader programming review, which also affected the MBC News Channel. The channel was accessible via digital terrestrial television.

== History ==
In December 2006, MBC announced its plan to introduce 12 new channels, with prominent mentions of Knowledge Channel, Sports 11, and Ciné 12. Although MBC initially targeted a launch date of 12 March 2007, to coincide with Mauritius' National Day, the launch was postponed. The Knowledge Channel officially began broadcasting on 18 September 2007. At peak viewing times, it aired children's programming, alongside recorded TV shows from TV5Monde and Voice of America.

The channel rebranded itself as the Kids Channel on 15 September 2014. During its tenure, the channel featured TV shows produced by the Mauritius College of the Air, now known as the Open University of Mauritius. Following its closure on 31 January 2015, MBC resumed broadcasting animated series and other children's shows on MBC 1 during morning and afternoon slots, similar to its schedule prior to September 2007.

On 3 April 2023, MBC rebranded its 17 channels as part of digital transformation, and MBC 5 is set as a children and documentary channel.

== List of shows broadcast ==
=== Animated series ===
- A Kind of Magic (Magic)
- Adiboo Adventure: Inside the Human Body (Adibou: Aventure dans le Corps Humain)
- Adventure Time
- Adventurers: Masters of Time
- AI Football GGO
- Angel's Friends
- Animalia
- Ants
- Argento Soma
- Ashley: The Growth of Monkey King
- Atomic Betty
- Atout 5
- Avatar: The Last Airbender (Avatar, le dernier maître de l'air)
- Back at the Barnyard (La Ferme en Folie)
- Bakugan Battle Brawlers
- Balin
- Ben 10
- Bernard
- Boom & Reds
- Boule et Bill
- Brainy Bubbly Bug Buddies
- Bubble Guppies (Bubulle Guppies)
- Bugs' Adventures
- Caillou
- Cajou
- Canimals
- Captain Biceps
- Casper's Scare School (Casper, l'école de la peur)
- CatDog (Michat-Michien)
- Cédric
- Chaplin & Co
- Chicken Stew
- Chocotte Minute
- Christophe Colomb
- Clever Raccoon Dog (Pluche, Riquet, Pat)
- Clic & Kat
- Code Lyoko
- Conch Bay
- Cooking? Child's Play! (La cuisine est un jeu d'enfants)
- Crafty Kids Club (Brico Club)
- Curious George (George le petit curieux)
- Danny Phantom
- Detective Bogey
- Dinofroz
- Dinosaur Train
- Dofus, aux trésors de Kerubim
- Dora the Explorer (Dora l’exploratrice)
- Dougie in Disguise (Dougie se déguise)
- Dragon Hunters (Chasseurs de Dragons)
- Edouard et Martin
- Famille Pirate
- Fanboy & Chum Chum
- Fantastic Four: World's Greatest Heroes (Les Quatre Fantastiques)
- Farhat: The Prince of The Desert
- Fish 'n' Chips
- Fix & Foxi and Friends
- Flipper & Lopaka
- FloopaLoo, Where Are You? (Flapacha, où es-tu?)
- Foot 2 Rue
- Football Stories
- Franky Snow
- Freefonix
- Galactik Football
- Geronimo Stilton
- Gloria's House (Gloria et les autres)
- Gnark Bugged
- Go, Diego, Go!
- Gofrette
- Gorg et Lala
- Gormiti Nature Unleashed
- Grabouillon
- Grenadine and Peppermint (Grenadine et Mentalo)
- Happy Lucky Bikkuriman
- Hareport
- Hutos: The Flying House
- Inspector Gadget (Inspecteur Gadget)
- Iron Man: Armored Adventures
- Jasper the Penguin (Jasper le pingouin)
- Johnny Test
- Jurassic Cubs (Petits Dinos)
- Kaeloo
- Kambu
- Kangoo
- Kid Paddle
- Kirikou découvre les animaux d'Afrique
- Kobushi
- Kung Fu Masters of the Zodiac: Origins of the Twelve
- Kung Fu Panda: Legends of Awesomeness (Kung Fu Panda: L'Incroyable Légende)
- Kung-foot
- La Fée Coquillette
- Lazy Lucy (Lucie)
- Le Monde de Pahé
- Le Petit Nicolas
- Les Blagues de Toto
- Les Dalton
- Les Minijusticiers
- Les P'tites Poules
- Les P'tits Diables
- Li'l Elvis and the Truckstoppers (Li'l Elvis et les Truckstoppers)
- Lily's Driftwood Bay
- Little Einsteins (Les Petits Einsteins)
- Lola & Virginia
- Lou!
- Louie (Didou)
- Lulu Zipadoo (Lulu Vroumette)
- Lulu's Islands (Les Mistigris)
- Lunar Jim
- Léon, (t)erreur de la savane
- Léonard
- Magic Planet
- Manon
- Marcelino
- Marsupilami
- Martin Morning (Martin Matin)
- Martin Mystery (Martin Mystère)
- Maya the Bee (Maya l'abeille)
- Megaminimals
- Mermaid Melody Pichi Pichi Pitch
- Mickey Mouse Clubhouse (La Maison de Mickey)
- Mikido
- Mila, raconte mille et une histoires
- Mini-Loup
- Minuscule
- Moko, enfant du monde
- Mon ami Grompf
- Mon robot et moi
- Monarch: The Big Bear of Tallac (Bouba)
- Monk Little Dog (Monk: la Cata sur Pattes)
- Monsuno
- Mouk
- Mr. Baby (Monsieur Bébé)
- My Friends Tigger & Pooh (Mes amis Tigrou et Winnie)
- Nelly & César
- Ni Hao, Kai-Lan
- Nini Patalo
- Noddy (Oui-Oui)
- Nono Forest
- Nouky and Friends (Paco, Nouky et Lola)
- Oggy and the Cockroaches (Oggy et les Cafards)
- Once Upon a Time... Planet Earth (Il était une fois... notre Terre)
- Oscar's Oasis
- OVNI
- Ozie Boo!
- Panshel
- Pat & Stan
- Paw Patrol (La Pat' Patrouille)
- Percy's Tiger Tales (Percy et ses amis)
- Phantom 2040
- Pitt & Kantrop
- Planet Sheen
- Playtime Buddies
- Pokémon
- Pondemonium
- Puppy in My Pocket: Adventures in Pocketville
- Rahan
- Raymond
- Sagwa, the Chinese Siamese Cat (Sagwa, le Chat Siamois Chinois)
- Saint Seiya: The Lost Canvas
- Sally Bollywood: Super Detective
- SamSam
- Samson et Néon
- Sandokan: The Tiger of Malaysia
- Santa's Apprentice (L'apprenti Père Noël)
- Scan2Go
- Scooby-Doo, Where Are You! (Scooby-Doo, où es-tu!)
- Shelldon
- Shuriken School
- Sid the Science Kid
- Simba, the King Lion
- Skunk Fu!
- Slayers
- Sophie's Misfortunes (Les Malheurs de Sophie)
- SOS Croco
- Speed Racer: The Next Generation
- Spirou et Fantasio
- Splash and Bubbles
- SpongeBob SquarePants (Bob l'éponge)
- Stoked (Stoked: Ça va surfer!)
- Strange Hill High (Le Collège d'Étrangeville)
- T'choupi et Doudou
- T'choupi et ses amis
- T'choupi à l'école
- T.U.F.F. Puppy
- Tak and the Power of Juju
- Tales of Tatonka (Les Légendes de Tatonka)
- Talis and the Thousand Tasks
- Team Galaxy
- Teenage Mutant Ninja Turtles (Les Tortues Ninja)
- Teletubbies
- Telmo and Tula
- Tendres Agneaux
- The Adventures of Jimmy Neutron, Boy Genius (Jimmy Neutron)
- The Adventures of Tom Sawyer (Tom Sawyer)
- The Amazing Spiez! (SpieZ! Nouvelle Génération)
- The Beet Party
- The Black Corsair
- The Gloops
- The Gnoufs (Les Gnoufs)
- The Great Book of Nature
- The Hydronauts (Les Hydronautes)
- The Land Before Time (Le Petit Dinosaure)
- The Last of the Mohicans
- The Magic Roundabout (Le Manège Enchanté)
- The Mysterious Cities of Gold (Les Mystérieuses Cités d'or)
- The New Woody Woodpecker Show
- The Nimbols
- The Old Testament
- The Penguins of Madagascar (Les Pingouins de Madagascar)
- The Simpsons
- The Small Giant (La Petite Géante)
- The Ugly Duckling (Filou, le Petit Canard)
- Thomas & Friends
- Titeuf
- Tom and Jerry Tales
- Tony et Alberto
- Toopy and Binoo (Toupie & Binou)
- Totally Spies!
- Triple Z
- Trolls of Troy (Trolls de Troy)
- Trotro
- Trust Me, I’m a Genie (Diego et Ziggy)
- Turtle Hero
- Ultimate Book of Spells
- Van Dogh
- Virus Attack
- Wakfu
- Wallace and Gromit
- Watch My Chops! (Corneil et Bernie)
- Winx Club
- Wonder Pets! (Wonder Choux!)
- Yakari
- Yu-Gi-Oh!
- Zig & Sharko
- Zoli & Pokey (Fils de Wouf!)
- Zoomix
- Zou
- Zumbers
- 2020

=== Live-action shows ===
- C'est pas sorcier
- Connor Undercover
- Daniela
- Des chiffres et des lettres
- Desperate Housewives
- Euromaxx - Lifestyle Europe
- Fort Boyard
- Glee
- Grachi
- Grey's Anatomy
- Groove High
- Hannah Montana
- How I Met Your Mother
- How to Rock
- iCarly
- Jessie
- Kids Flix
- Marvin Marvin
- Modern Family
- My Almost Famous Family
- My Animal Family
- Pop Corn TV - New Generation
- Prove It!
- Really Me
- Sam & Cat
- Stormworld
- Thalassa
- The Suite Life of Zack & Cody (La Vie de palace de Zack et Cody)
- The Thundermans
- The Troop
- Victorious
- Violetta
- Wizards of Waverly Place (Les Sorciers de Waverly Place)
- Zoey 101

== See also ==
- MBC 1
- MBC 2
- Ciné 12
- Media of Mauritius
- List of television channels in Mauritius
