= Daniela (2002 TV series) =

- Created by: Pablo Serra; Erika Johnson
- Developed by: Telemundo; Argos Comunicación
- Directed by: Javier Patron
- Starring: Litzy; Rodrigo De la Rosa; Osvaldo Benavides
- Theme music composer: Kike Santander
- Opening theme: "Sobrevivire" performed by Litzy
- Countries of origin: United States; Mexico
- Original language: Spanish
- No. of episodes: 120

Production
- Executive producer: Carlos Rene Espinosa
- Producers: Carlos Payán; Epigmenio Ibarra
- Production location: Mexico
- Editor: Perla Martinez
- Camera setup: Multi-camera
- Running time: 42–45 minutes

Original release
- Network: Telemundo
- Release: May 6 – October 18, 2002

Related
- La Guerra de las Rosas; Pedro El Escamoso

Daniela is a Spanish-language telenovela television series produced by the United States–based television network Telemundo and the Mexican production company Argos Comunicacion. This limited-run series ran for 120 episodes from May 6 to October 18, 2002. Daniela was aired in eleven countries around the world.

== Cast ==
- Litzy as Daniela Gamboa
- Rodrigo de la Rosa as Mauricio Lavalle
- Osvaldo Benavides as Andres Miranda
- Ximena Rubio as Paola Arango
- Marta Zamora as Enriqueta Montijo De Gamboa
- Rene Gatica as Poncho Gamboa
- Pilar Mata as Laura Arango
- Marco Treviño as Osvaldo
- Elizabeth Guindi as Regina Lavalle
- Luis Cardenas as Federico Arango
- Socorro de la Campa
- Teresa Tuccio as Gabriela Arango
- Magali Boysselle as Maria Elena 'La Nena'
- Masha Kostiurina as Marylin Gamboa
- Alexandra de la Mora as Roger Gamboa / Renata Vogel
- Gustavo Navarro as Larry Campbell
- Alma Frether as Camila Lavalle
- Tara Parra as Chelito Gamboa
- Lucha Moreno
- Claudia Irobo
- Armando Pascual
- Roberto Escobar as Armando Lavalle
- Elvira Monsell as Isabel Miranda

== International release ==
Sources:

- ABS-CBN aired between 2002 and 2003 in Philippines.
- Tedi Tv passed in 2002 to 2003 in Angola.
- TV Markíza started to air this telenovela on January 28, 2004, and the rerun was aired in 2006, in Slovakia. The telenovela is dubbed in Slovak.
- Indosiar aired the show during mornings in 2004, and the rerun was aired in the mid of 2008 as midnight show, in Indonesia. This series is dubbed in Bahasa Indonesia.
- RTV Pink started to air this telenovela on October 7, 2009, and MHC on October 17, 2011, in Serbia.
- Telemetro started to air this telenovela on May 10, 2011, in Panama.
- Al Sumaria started to air this telenovela in October, 2011 in Iraq. The telenovela is dubbed in Iraqi Arabic.
- OTV began to air it in December 2013 in Lebanon, dubbed in Lebanese Arabic.
- Mauritius Broadcasting Corporation aired this telenovela in 2014 on MBC 2 and rebroadcast on Cine 12 in Mauritius. The telenovela is dubbed in French.
- SKAI aired this telenovela in 2011 on ALPHA TV and rebroadcast on POLIS in Greece. The telenovela is dubbed in Greek and was translated by Kelly Samiotou, Anastasia Lazaridou, and Kostas Makedos.
