= Fami Pa Kontan =

- Also known as: The Family Is Not Happy
- Written by: Miselaine Duval Vurden
- Directed by: Miselaine Duval Vurden
- Country of origin: Mauritius
- Original languages: Mauritian creole French
- No. of seasons: 1
- No. of episodes: approximately 38

Production
- Running time: around 26 minutes
- Production company: Karavann Events Ltd

Original release
- Network: MBC 1 Senn Kreol
- Release: October 5, 2012 – April 2013

Fami Pa Kontan (English: The Family Is Not Happy) was a Mauritian television show that aired on MBC 1 on Fridays at 9.00 p.m. The show has also been re-aired on Senn Kreol.

== Plot ==
Fami Pa Kontan is a story of newlyweds French girl, Marie-Clarence and a Mauritian boy, François. Marie-Clarence's mother, Mrs. Marie-Jeanne Bavière, had misgivings about the marriage. The day after the marriage ceremony, Marie-Jeanne Bavière landed in Mauritius with an idea of breaking the relationship. She repeatedly tried to break-up the couple but was unsuccessful. Arnaud and Vivian, respectively the father and uncle of François come into conflict with Marie-Jeanne. Marie-Jeanne Bavière pretended to be ill making Marie-Clarence separate from François but later they were reconvinced. Failed, she called the childhood friend of Marie-Clarence, Dimitrio, who is an Italian with the hope that he will seduce her but this time too she was unsuccessful.

But before Dimitri left the country, he went to François' place to talk to Marie-Clarence. Dimitrio showed some picture of François with a woman. He made Marie-Clarence believed that François is having an affair with that woman. Then, she told Dimitrio that she did not want to stay in François's house. So, Dimitrio and Marie-Jeanne went to a hotel. Arnaud and Marie-Jeanne fell in love. Robbers broke into the house of Akim. Arnaud caught them red-handed and beat them and the police were called. They were sent to the police station. François learns in which hotel Marie-Clarence and Dimitrio live and he and his father, Arnaud, go there. Marie-Clarence and François fought against each other.

Philip Bavière, father of Marie-Clarence and ex-husband of Marie-Jeanne, came to Mauritius on hearing all these problems. He knew that Marie-Jeanne is the cause of Marie-Clarence and François's separation. Meanwhile, Vivian is worrying for François and Cindy, Vivian's ex-wife, tells him to not be tensed and to not interfere in François's life. Philip was driving like a mad on the road without knowing where he was going. He met Arnaud and asked him to show him the route to the house of his wife, Marie-Jeanne, as he was lost. Arnaud explained to him and he reached at a supermarket 'Dodo' where he met Akim. He asked to him the whereabouts of Marie-Jeanne. Akim told him that there is a lady who lives in his house as a renter whose name is Marie-Jeanne but she was not at home.

Some days later, Philip went to the house and quarreled with Marie-Jeanne. Marie-Jeanne asked Marie-Clarence why she called her father in the country. They fought and Marie-Clarence said that she's tired of Marie-Jeanne. Marie-Jeanne brings the divorce papers to François but he refused to sign because he wants only Marie-Clarence to bring the papers on her own. Philippe tells her daughter that François is innocent and her mother is the cause of the problems. Cindy tells Vivian and Arnaud that she is pregnant while they were having lunch. Philip organises a barbecue party to solve François and Marie-Clarence's problems. He invited Marie-Jeanne, Marie-Clarence and the François family. Arnaud tells Vivian to bring another woman to the party because he wants to end his and Marie-Jeanne's relationship. But Vivian invited Arnaud's ex-wife. Arnaud fought with Vivian because he brought his ex-wife. Arnaud told his ex-wife that he doesn't want them to be together again.

In the last episode Arnaud and Marie-Jeanne are married.

== Cast and characters ==
Cast	Characters
Alexandre Martin	François François
Rachel De Speville	Marie-Clarence Bavière
Wesley Duval	Vivian François
Miselaine Duval	Marie-Jeanne Bavière
Didier Anthony	Arnaud François
Yousouf Elahee	Akim Taleb
Alessandro Kiara	Dimitrio

== Cast ==
=== François François ===
Main character of the TV Show, François François is played by Alexandre Martin. François is very quiet. He is very close to his dad, Arnaud François, who raised him alone.

=== Marie Clarence François(Bavière) ===
Marie Clarence François (Bavière) is played by Rachel de Speville. She is the also the main character of the TV Show and the wife of François François.

=== Vivian François ===
Vivian François is played by Wesley Duval. He never leaves his bottle of whiskey and does not miss an opportunity to look at it with envy. It was also he who had found a wonderful idea to name his nephew François, which gives François François.

=== Marie-Jeanne Bavière ===
Miselaine Duval's character is Marie-Jeanne Bavière. She is the mother-in-law of François François. She is a Mauritian who settled in France and is married to a French but she divorced him later. She has only one thing in mind: break-up the marriage of her daughter. She did not want her daughter to marry a Mauritian.

=== Arnaud François ===
François Arnaud, played by Didier Anthony is the typical profile of a loving father. Having raised his son, François, alone, he is very close to him and is capable of doing anything to make François happy. He's nice to everyone, however he can become very nasty if you try to walk over him. He does not speak French well, he has trouble to make people understand when he tries to speak the language of Molière.

=== Dimitro ===
Dimitrio, played by Alessandro Kiara, is the childhood friend of Marie-Clarence. Marie-Jeanne, mother of Marie-Clarence, called Dimitrio in Mauritius with hope that he will seduce Marie-Clarence but was unsuccessful.

=== Akim Taleb ===
Akim Taleb, played by Yousouf Elahee, picked Marie-Clarence, who was abandoned on the road because she misbehaved to Arnaud François, and Marie-Jeanne lives in his house as a renter.

=== Philip Bavière ===
He is the father of Marie-Clarence and ex-husband of Marie-Jeanne. He came to the country to save his daughter's, Marie-Clarence's, marriage.

== See also ==
- Media of Mauritius
- Category:Mauritius Broadcasting Corporation original programming
