= MBC 2 =

MBC 2 may refer to:

- MBC 2 (Mauritian TV channel), a television channel in Mauritius by the Mauritius Broadcasting Corporation
- MBC 2 (Middle Eastern and North African TV channel), a television channel in Dubai, United Arab Emirates by the Middle East Broadcasting Center
