= MBC 1 =

MBC 1 may refer to:

- MBC 1 (Mauritian TV channel)
- MBC 1 (Saudi TV channel)
