= Crazy TV =

- Genre: Comedy
- Directed by: Nadeem Varsally
- Country of origin: Mauritius
- Original languages: Mauritian Creole; French; English
- No. of seasons: 6
- No. of episodes: 47

Production
- Producer: Nadeem Varsally
- Running time: 8 minutes (Season 1-4) 18 minutes (Season 4-6)
- Production companies: DigiPro; Kinoseven

Original release
- Network: MBC 2 (Season 1-2); Facebook (Season 3-6); YouTube (Season 4-6)
- Release: 16 October 2012 – present

Crazy TV is a Mauritian entertainment and comedy show created by Nadeem Varsally. The first season of the show premiered on MBC 2 on 16 October 2012. The season 2, which debuted on 27 October 2014, aired on the same channel from Monday to Friday at 18H50 MUT. Season 4,5 and 6 of the show were available on Facebook and YouTube.

== Premise ==
Crazy TV gathers several genres, sketches, parodies, gags and promotes artists. It is interactive.
