= MBC 3 (Mauritian TV channel) =

Public broadcaster of the Republic of Mauritius

MBC Digital 3
- Country: Mauritius
- Headquarters: Moka, Mauritius

Programming
- Picture format: 576i (16:9) (SDTV)

Ownership
- Owner: Mauritius Broadcasting Corporation
- Sister channels: MBC 1 MBC 2 MBC 4 MBC Sat; Kids Channel; YSTV; Ciné 12; Bhojpuri Channel; Senn Kreol

History
- Launched: March 1996

Links
- Website: www.mbc.mu/mbc3

MBC Digital 3 is a Mauritian free-to-air television channel owned by the Mauritius Broadcasting Corporation, which is the national state broadcaster. The channel was launched in March 1996. Its programming consists of news and cultural TV programmes. In the early 2000s, it was an affiliate of TVAfrica's sports output.

== See also ==
- Kids Channel (Mauritian TV channel)
- MBC 1 (Mauritian TV channel)
- MBC 2 (Mauritian TV channel)
- BTV (Mauritius)

List of Shows Broadcast by the Mauritius Broadcasting Corporation
