= Le Pouce =

Mountain in Mauritius

Coordinates: 20°11′50″S 57°31′42.6″E

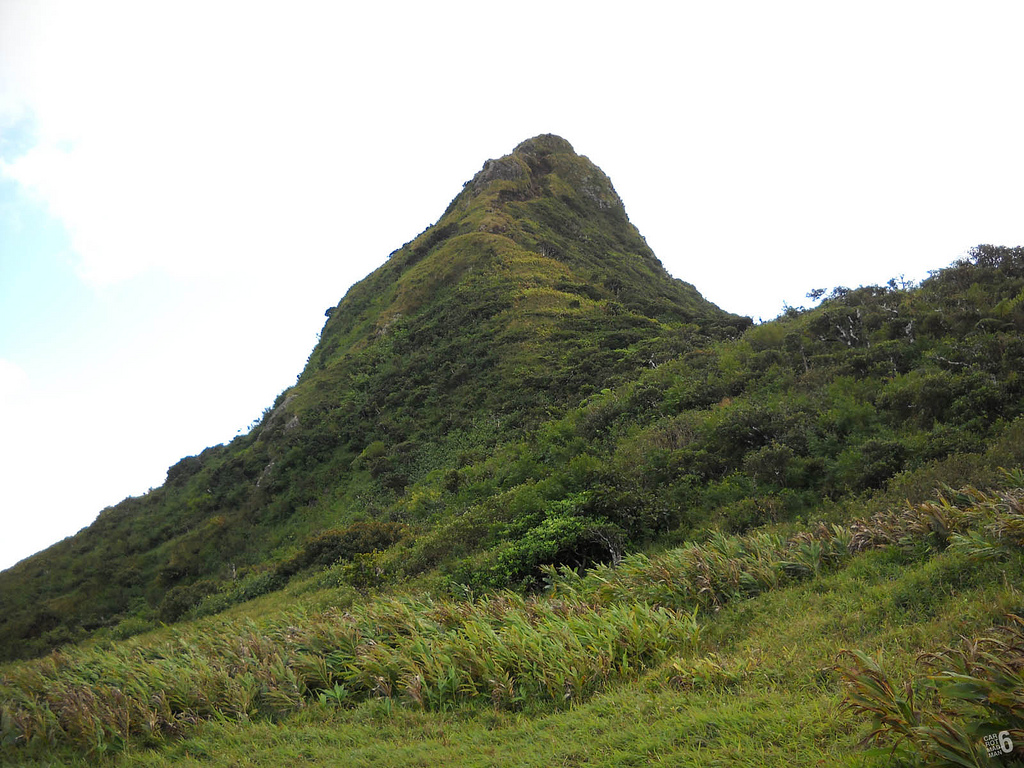
- The thumb-shaped peak of Le Pouce

Highest point
- Elevation: 812 m (2,664 ft)
- Prominence: 232 m (761 ft)

Naming
- Pronunciation: [lə pus]

Geography
- Location: La Laura-Malenga, Moka, Mauritius
- Parent range: Moka Range

Geology
- Rock age: around 10 million years old
- Mountain type: Lava dome
- Volcanic zone: Mascarene Islands

Climbing
- Easiest route: Hike

Le Pouce (French: [lə pus]; English: "The Thumb") is the third highest mountain in Mauritius, at 812 meters (2664 feet). Only Piton de la Petite Rivière Noire (828 m) and Pieter Both (820 m) are taller. It is named Le Pouce because of the thumb-shaped peak of the mountain. It can be viewed from the capital of Mauritius, Port Louis, and is a popular hike for the view of the city. The mountain is in the Moka Range and is closest to the village of La Laura-Malenga in the Moka District. Charles Darwin ascended the mountain on 2 May 1836.

== Natural features ==
The Mascarene Islands, the island chain that Mauritius lies in, is a volcanic belt. Le Pouce is the second highest peak in the Moka Range, which was formed ten million years ago from volcano eruptions. The range is a basalt lava dome and is no longer volcanically active.

Le Pouce is overgrown with guava and acacia, which are not native to the area. One example of flora endemic to Le Pouce is Pandanus pseudomontanus commonly known as Le Pouce Mountain Screwpine. This plant is not officially listed on the IUCN Red List, but IUCN has potentially assessed it as critically endangered. The only individuals of this species are two plants in the Le Pouce Mountain Nature Reserve. Since both of these are male plants, the species is at "extremely high risk of extinction'.

=== Hiking ===
The trek to the top of Le Pouce is considered an easy hike. However, the ascent is very steep, especially near the thumb. Le Pouce can be reached from Moka or Port Louis. Unlike Pieter Both, climbing gear is not needed. From the peak, Port Louis, Moka, and Beau-Bassin Rose-Hill can be seen, as well as many other places around the island.

== History ==
Le Pouce was formed ten million years ago in a basalt lava dome. Charles Darwin ascended the mountain during his voyage around the world. He recorded in his journal:

[On 2 May] I ascended La Pouce [sic], a mountain so called from a thumb-like projection, which rises close behind the town to a height of 2600 feet. The centre of the island consists of a great platform, surrounded by old broken basaltic mountains, with their strata dipping seawards. The central platform, formed of comparatively recent streams of lava, is of an oval shape, thirteen geographical miles across, in the line of its shorter axis. The exterior bounding mountains come into that class of structures called Craters of Elevation, which are supposed to have been formed not like ordinary craters, but by a great and sudden upheaval. There appears to me to be insuperable objections to this view: on the other hand, I can hardly believe, in this and in some other cases, that these marginal crateriform mountains are merely the basal remnants of immense volcanos, of which the summits either have been blown off, or swallowed up in subterranean abysses.

As time went by and tourism increased, hiking Le Pouce became a tourist attraction.

== Le Pouce Nature Reserve ==
Le Pouce Nature Reserve was created in 1951. It protects an area of 0.69 km^{2} on the mountain's northwest flank.

== Gallery ==
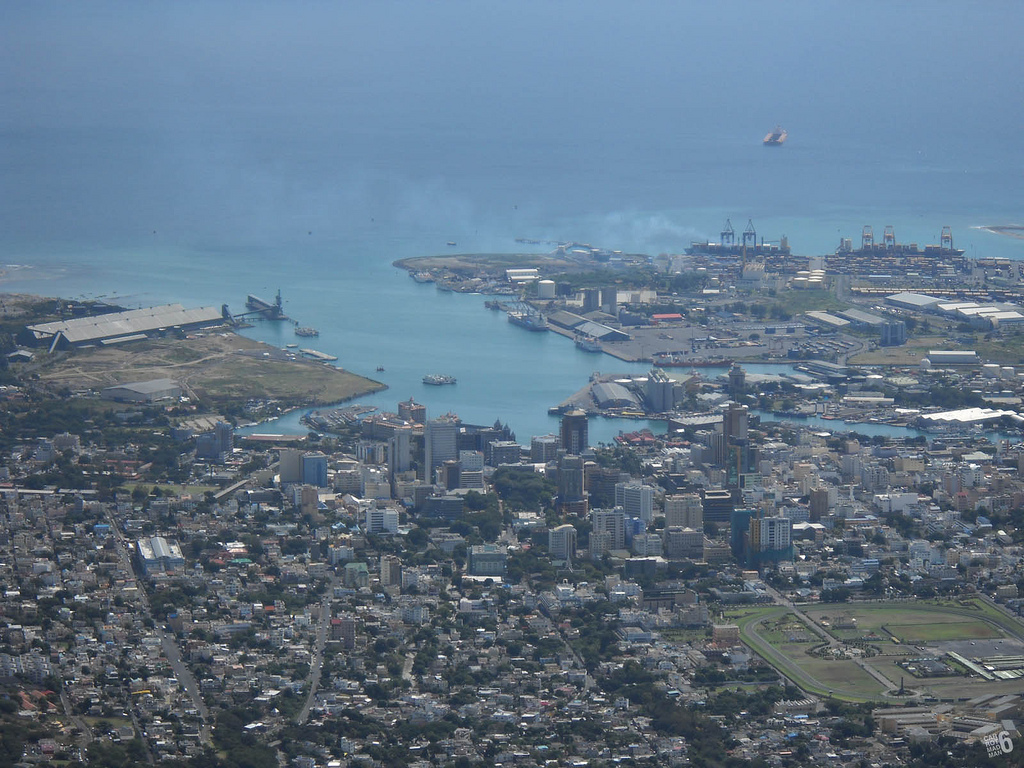
The view of Port Louis from the summit

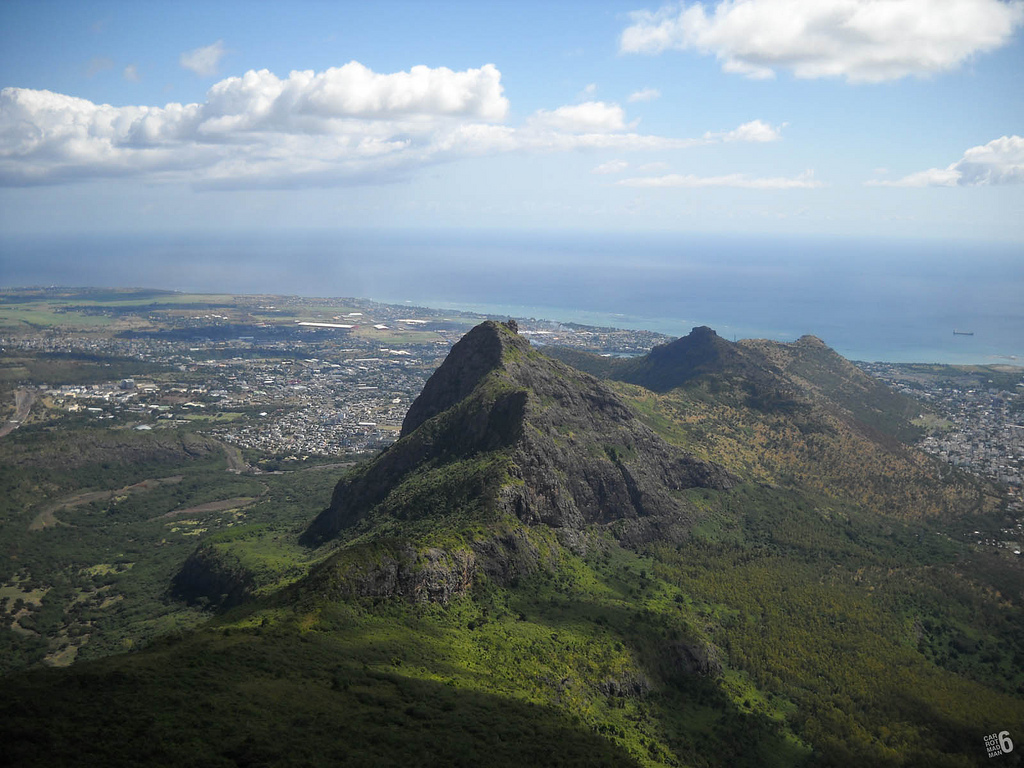
The Moka Range from the top of Le Pouce

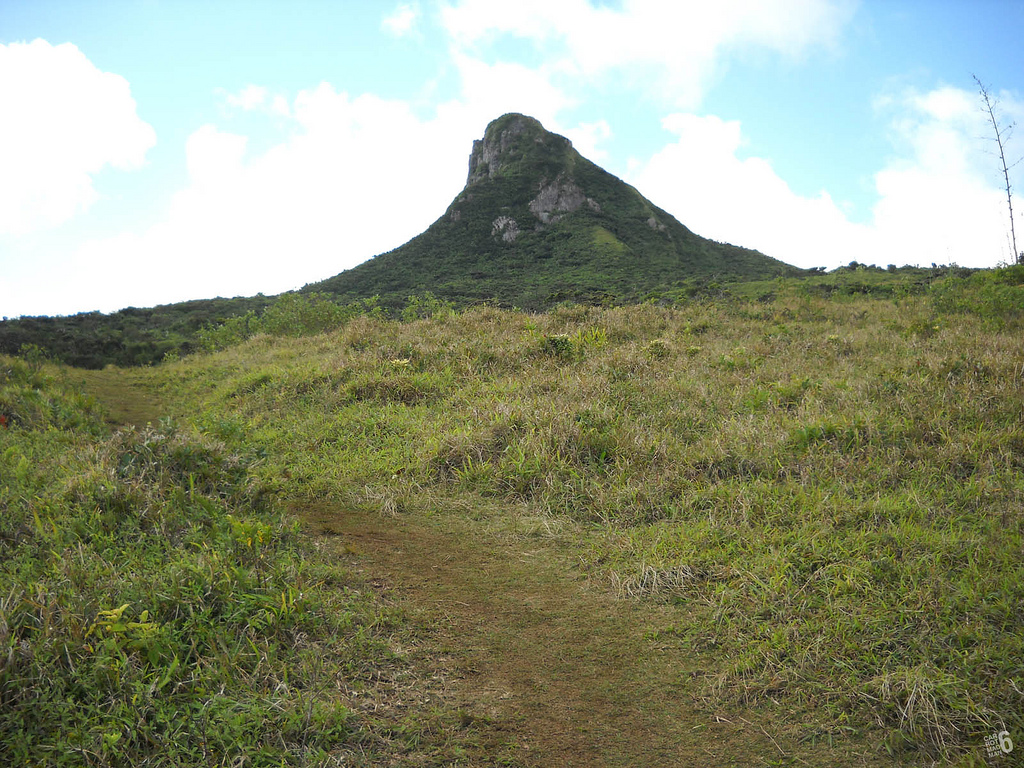
A view of "The Thumb" from a hiking trail

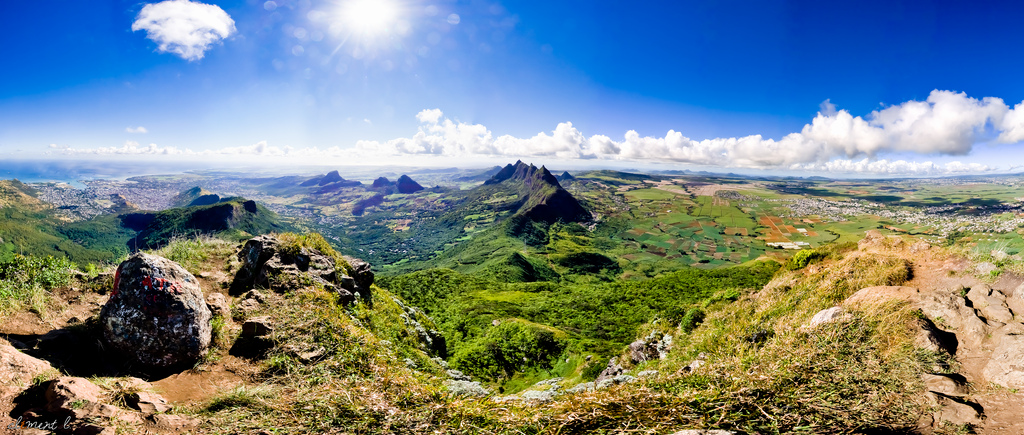
Panoramic view of Mauritius from Le Pouce

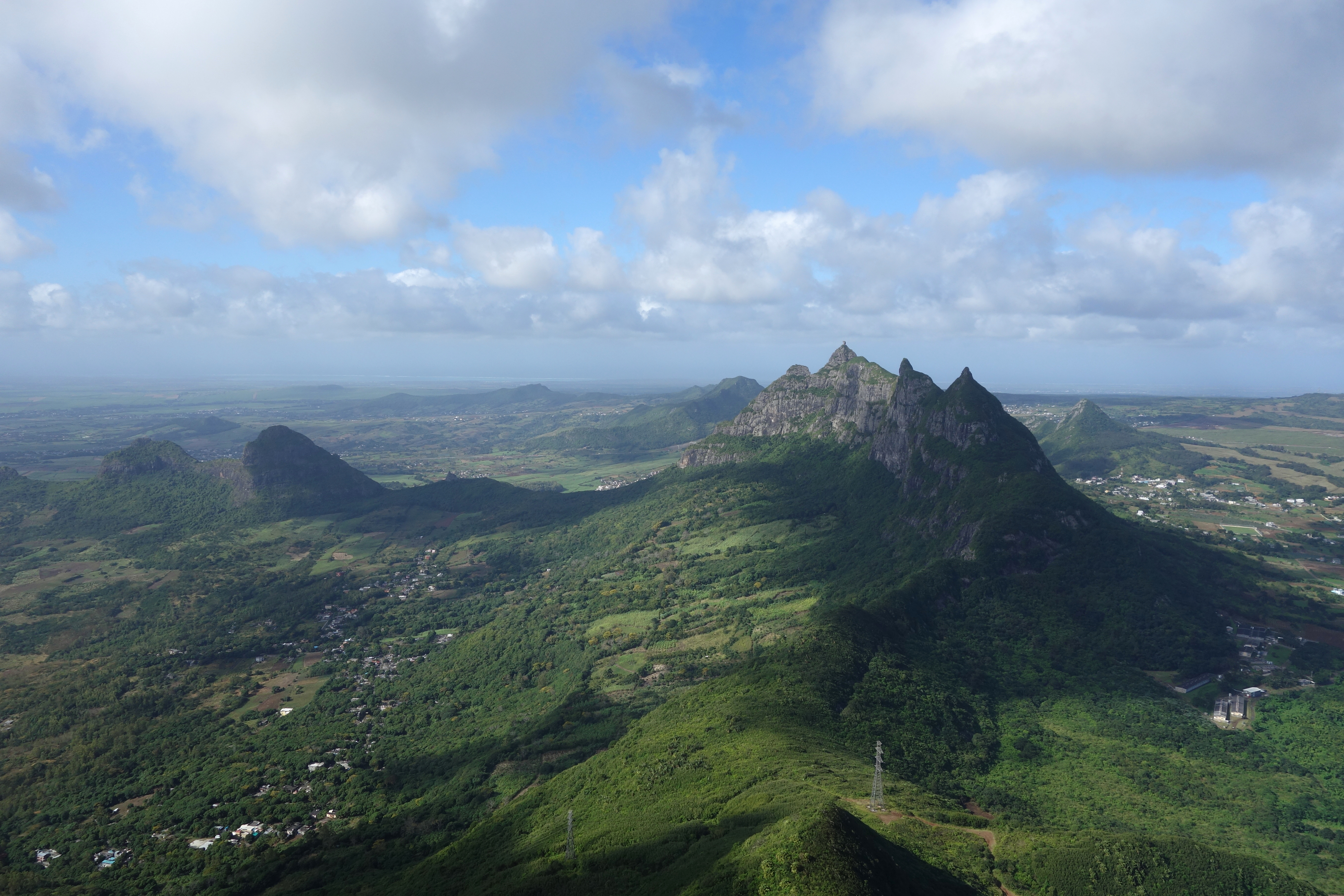
View from Le Pouce facing Pieter Both

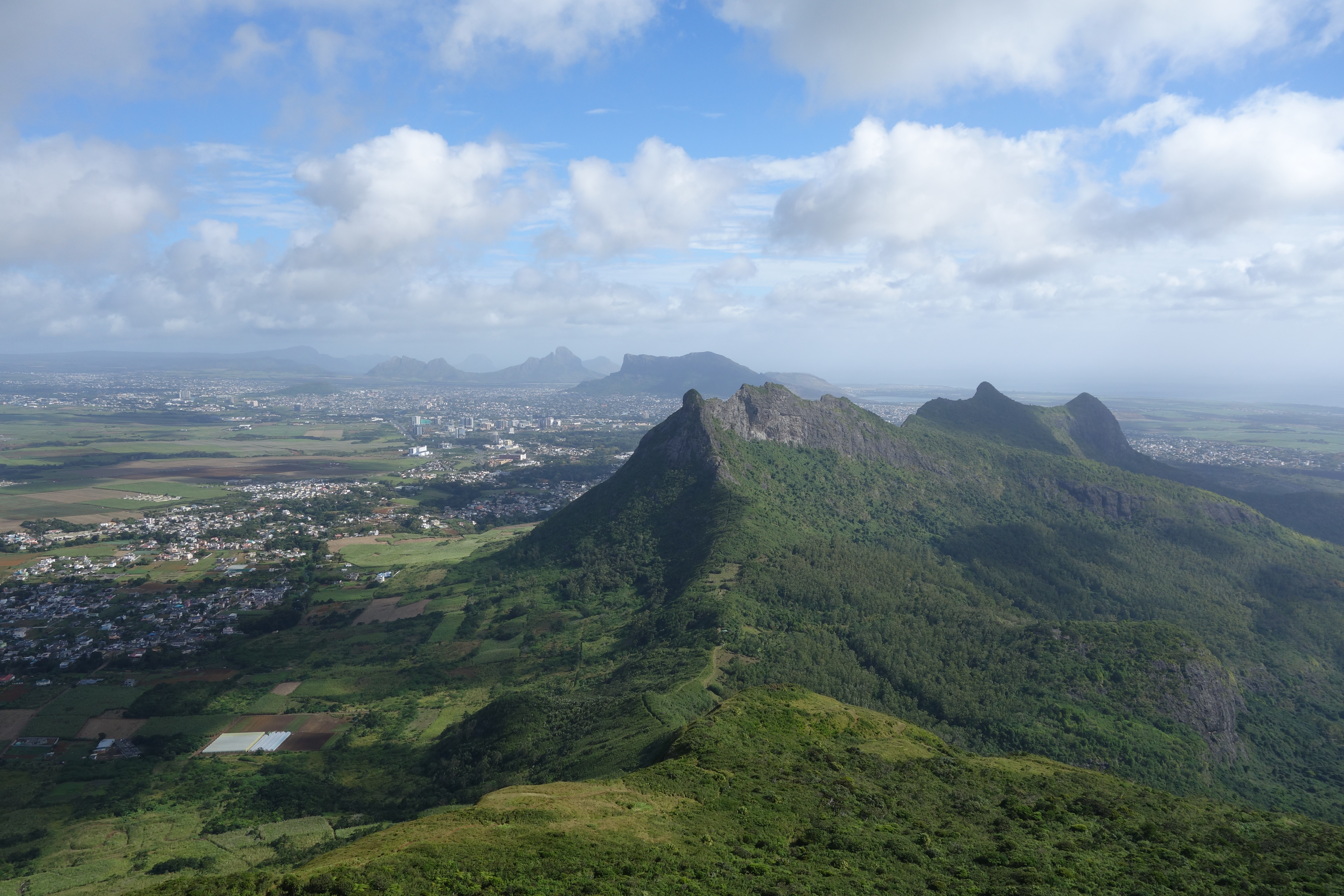
View from Le Pouce facing Moka village
