= Happy Bacia =

Happy Mary Bacia
Personal information
- Citizenship: Uganda
- Born: 8 December 1985 (age 40)
- Occupation: Athlete

Sport
- Events: Pole vault; Middle distance running

Happy Mary Bacia (born 8 December 1985 in Arua) is a Ugandan athlete specializing in pole vault, race walking, and middle-distance running.

== Notable achievements ==
- Bronze medal for the 800 metres at the African Junior Championships held in 2001 in Réduit, Mauritius.
- Gold medals at the Ugandan National Championships in various events (pole vault, 800m, 5000m track walk) in 1998 to 2001.

== Personal best records ==
- Pole vault – 2.10 metres (1998) – former Ugandan record.
- 5000-metre race walk – 28:16.4 (1998).
- 800 metres – 2:05.6 (2001, Kampala).
- 1500 metres - 4:37.41 (2008, El Paso USA).
