= MBC 4 (Mauritian TV channel) =

TV channel in Mauritius

BTV (Mauritius)
- Country: Mauritius
- Headquarters: Moka, Mauritius

Programming
- Language: Hindi
- Picture format: 576i (16:9) (SDTV)

Ownership
- Owner: Mauritius Broadcasting Corporation
- Sister channels: MBC 1 MBC 2 MBC 3 MBC Sat; Ciné 12; Kids Channel; YSTV; Senn Kreol; Bhojpuri Channel

History
- Launched: February 2011
- Former names: MBC Digital 4 (2011-2019); BTV (2019-2023)

Links
- Website: www.mbc.mu/mbc4

Availability

Terrestrial
- MCML: Channel 4

MBC 4 (formerly BTV) is a Mauritian free-to-air television channel owned by the Mauritius Broadcasting Corporation, the public broadcaster. Launched in February 2011, the channel broadcasts Hindi-language programmes. Its programming consists of Indian TV series and non-fictional shows from Zee TV, Star Plus, Colors TV, Sony TV, Sony SAB, &TV and Star Bharat.

== See also ==
- Kids Channel (Mauritian TV channel)
- MBC 1 (Mauritian TV channel)
- MBC 2 (Mauritian TV channel)
- MBC 3 (Mauritian TV channel)
- List of programs broadcast by the Mauritius Broadcasting Corporation
