= Lockdown Island =

Reality TV show

- Genre: Reality Show
- Created by: Holdem Studios
- Presented by: Martine Fong
- Starring: Angie Callychurn, Axcelle Henry, Bigg Frankii, Dae Stafford, Emmanuel Savannah, James Agathe, Jessica Cheung, Joel Lecordier, Lionel Merven, Lioness Stacy, Natty Gong, Noemie Barragan, Sneha Gookool, Tanusha Racoude, Visham Ramdoo
- Narrated by: Yanish Armoogum
- Theme music composer: Shehzad K & Sarah Janabi
- Country of origin: Mauritius
- Original languages: French, Mauritian Creole
- No. of seasons: 1
- No. of episodes: 12

Production
- Executive producer: Jérôme Stéphane Appavoo
- Producer: Holdem Studios Ltd
- Production location: Mauritius
- Running time: 29 – 42 minutes

Original release
- Network: MBC
- Release: 18 July 2020 – 2020

Lockdown Island is the first Mauritian TV reality show. Around 17 participants, which en globes influencers, sportsmen, singers among other popular personalities are locked up, showing the lifestyle of the housemates during their stay in a villa for around twenty days. Its trailer first premiered online on 7 June 2020.

== Lockdown Island Contestants 2020 ==
Contestant	Profession
Angie Callychurn	Universe Mauritius 2017, Blogger
Axcelle Henry	Miss Marielite 2016 & Director of |Excella Models
Bigg Frankii	Singer
Dae Stafford	Fashion Stylist & Pageant Coach
Emmanuel Savannah	DJ
James Agathe	Kick Boxer
Jessica Cheung	Clothing Brand Owner & Blogger
Joel Lecordier	Copywriter
JSB Morning Game	Singer
Lionel Merven	National rugby team player and Businessman
Lioness Stacy	Singer
Marie Pesi	Horse Riding Instructor
Natty Gong	Singer & Sports Coach
Noemie Barragan	Animal Keeper, ethologist
Sneha Gookool	2nd Runner Up Miss Universe Mauritius 2018
Tanusha Racoude	Lifestyle Blogger
Visham Ramdoo	Influencer & Comedian
