= MBC 1 (Mauritian TV channel) =

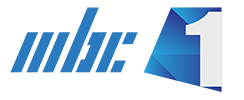
- Country: Mauritius
- Broadcast area: Mauritius, Rodrigues, Agaléga, worldwide (online with restricted programming)
- Headquarters: Mauritius, Moka

Programming
- Language: Multiligual
- Picture format: 1080i HDTV (downscaled to 16:9 576i for the SDTV feed)

Ownership
- Sister channels: MBC 2 MBC 3 MBC 4 MBC Sat; Kids Channel; YSTV; Ciné 12; Bhojpuri Channel; Senn Kreol

History
- Launched: 8 June 1964 (test); 8 January 1965 (regular, de facto); 8 February 1965 (regular, de jure)

Links
- Website: www.mbc.mu/mbc1

Availability

Terrestrial
- MCML: Channel 1

MBC 1 is a Mauritian free-to-air television channel of the Mauritius Broadcasting Corporation, the national state broadcaster. MBC 1 was launched as the first TV channel in the island country on 8 June 1964.

== History ==
MBC 1's former logo, used from 1965 up to 2015.

In 1963, the then-Mauritius Broadcasting Service signed an agreement with British company Thomson Television International (also known as Television International Enterprises Limited) to provide assistance for the launch of the television service. In view of this, MBS (renamed MBC per a 1964 ordinance) started work on a new Broadcasting House in October 1963, to accommodate both radio and television. A transmitter was already installed by the end of the year at Malherbes and later conducted field tests which were all successful.

The main transmitter was located at Curepipe from which it broadcast on VHF channel 4, supplemented by three relay stations. Pilot television signals started in 1964, during this period MBC installed the relay stations at Fort George, Mount Thérése, and Jurançon. After the installation of the last of these repeaters (Jurançon) on 31 December 1964, official broadcasts began de facto on 8 January 1965, with the publishing of advertisements in newspapers giving incentive to buy television sets, becoming de jure on 8 February 1965 at 5:45pm with the participation of Prime Minister Seewoosagur Ramgoolam. The first continuity announcers were Monique Ohsan and Padma Ghurburrun. MBC lacked an outside broadcast van in its early years, with local events being shot on film and later processed to appear on the news bulletins.

Color broadcasts in the SECAM format started in December 1975, which also envisioned the creation of a French-funded satellite earth station.

On November 3, 2013, MBC (Mauritius) introduced the MBC News Channel which airs between 7AM-6PM on MBC 1, bringing up-to-date local, regional and international news every hour including reportages and documentaries in major Mauritian speaking language. MBC News Channel remained a block on MBC 1, from 7 AM to 6PM until January 31, 2015 where it was removed.

== See also ==
- Mauritius Broadcasting Corporation
- Kids Channel (Mauritian TV channel)
- MBC 2 (Mauritian TV channel)
- MBC 3 (Mauritian TV channel)
- BTV (Mauritian TV channel)
- List of television channels in Mauritius
- Media of Mauritius
- List of programs broadcast by the Mauritius Broadcasting Corporation
