= Bhojpuri Channel =

- Country: Mauritius, India
- Headquarters: Mauritius, Moka, Faizabad, India

Programming
- Picture format: 576i (SDTV 16:9, 4:3)

Ownership
- Owner: Mauritius Broadcasting Corporation
- Sister channels: MBC 1 MBC 2 MBC 3 MBC 4 MBC Sat; YSTV; Ciné 12; Kids Channel; Senn Kreol

History
- Launched: January 30, 2013

Links
- Website: https://web.archive.org/web/20131029230053/http://www.mbcradio.tv/mbc/B-channel

Bhojpuri Channel is a TV Channel owned by the Mauritius Broadcasting Corporation, which is the national state broadcaster. Launched in January 2013, the TV cannel broadcasts programs in Bhojpuri language, including cookery shows, pre-recorded radio show, Bhojpuri telefilms and more for the Mauritian population.

== List Of Programs ==
=== Local Programs ===
- Bol Bandhu
- Kheti Baari
- Khel Khabar
- Tu Tu Mei Mei (Bhojpuri local serial)
- Anjoria
- Chatkar Pakwan
- Show from Hamar TV
- Kahan Jaat Ba Hamni Ke Samaaj
- Naari Shakti
- Camere Ke Nazar Se
- Tohar Sehat
- Bhojpuri Dhamaka
- Bhojpuri Hits - Countdown Show
- Gulmohar Ki Chaoun Mein
- Ao Chala Gaon Ghume
- Bhojpuri Clips
- Hum Mawjawan
- Apan Adhikar
- Tohar Khatir
- Guzra Zamana
- Hamare Nagrik
- Kala

=== Currently broadcasting fictional Shows ===
- Dulhin Uhe Jo Nanad Man Bhave
- Agle Janam Mohe Bitiya Hi Kijo
- Badki Malkain
- Ee Hai Annapoorna
- Kajri
- Sajanwa Bairi Hi Gaile Hamar
- Hamare Gaow Hamare Desh

=== Formerly broadcast fictional shows ===
- Junior G

== See also ==
- Kids Channel (Mauritian TV channel)
- MBC 1 (Mauritian TV channel)
- MBC 2 (Mauritian TV channel)
