= MBC 11 =

Sports television channel in Mauritius

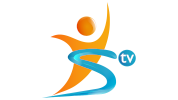
- Country: Mauritius
- Headquarters: Moka. Mauritius

Programming
- Picture format: 576i (SDTV 16:9, 4:3), 1080i (HDTV)

Ownership
- Owner: Mauritius Broadcasting Corporation
- Sister channels: MBC 1 MBC 2 MBC 3 MBC 4 MBC Sat; Ciné 12; Bhojpuri Channel; Kids Channel; Senn Kreol

History
- Launched: 2011
- Former names: Sports 11 (2011-2019); YSTV (2019-2023)

Links
- Website: www.mbc.mu/mbc11

MBC 11 (formerly Sports 11 and YSTV) is a sports television channel owned and broadcast by the Mauritius Broadcasting Corporation. Launched in 2011 as Sports 11, it was rebranded as YSTV on 18 April 2019.

It broadcasts sports programming, including live telecast of football matches (along with its sister channel MBC 3) and horse racing, as well as health programs.

On 3 April 2023, the channel was rebranded as MBC 11 as part of the rebranding of all MBC channels reorganized under names from MBC 1 to MBC 17.

== See also ==
- Kids Channel (Mauritian TV channel)
- MBC 1 (Mauritian TV channel)
- MBC 2 (Mauritian TV channel)
