= MBC Sat =

- Country: Mauritius
- Broadcast area: Mauritius, Rodrigues, Réunion, Mayotte
- Headquarters: Moka, Moka District

Programming
- Language(s): French, English, Creole, Hindi
- Picture format: 576i (16:9 and 4:3) (SDTV), 1080i (HDTV)

Ownership
- Owner: Mauritius Broadcasting Corporation
- Sister channels: MBC 1 MBC 2 MBC 3 MBC 4 YSTV; Ciné 12; Kids Channel; Senn Kreol; Bhojpuri Channel

History
- Launched: November 13, 2014

Links
- Website: www.mbcradio.tv/mbc/mbc

MBC Sat is a television channel of the Mauritius Broadcasting Corporation broadcast in Mauritius. It was launched on November 13, 2014 after an agreement between Mauritius Broadcasting Corporation and CanalSat Mauritius. It is the first satellite channel by the Mauritian national TV broadcaster to broadcast via satellite. It also started to diffuse across the Indian Ocean including Mauritius via Parabole during November 2016. It broadcasts programs in French, English, Creole and Hindi.
