= Charles Michel de Langlade =

American fur trader (1729–1801)

Charles Michel Mouet de Langlade
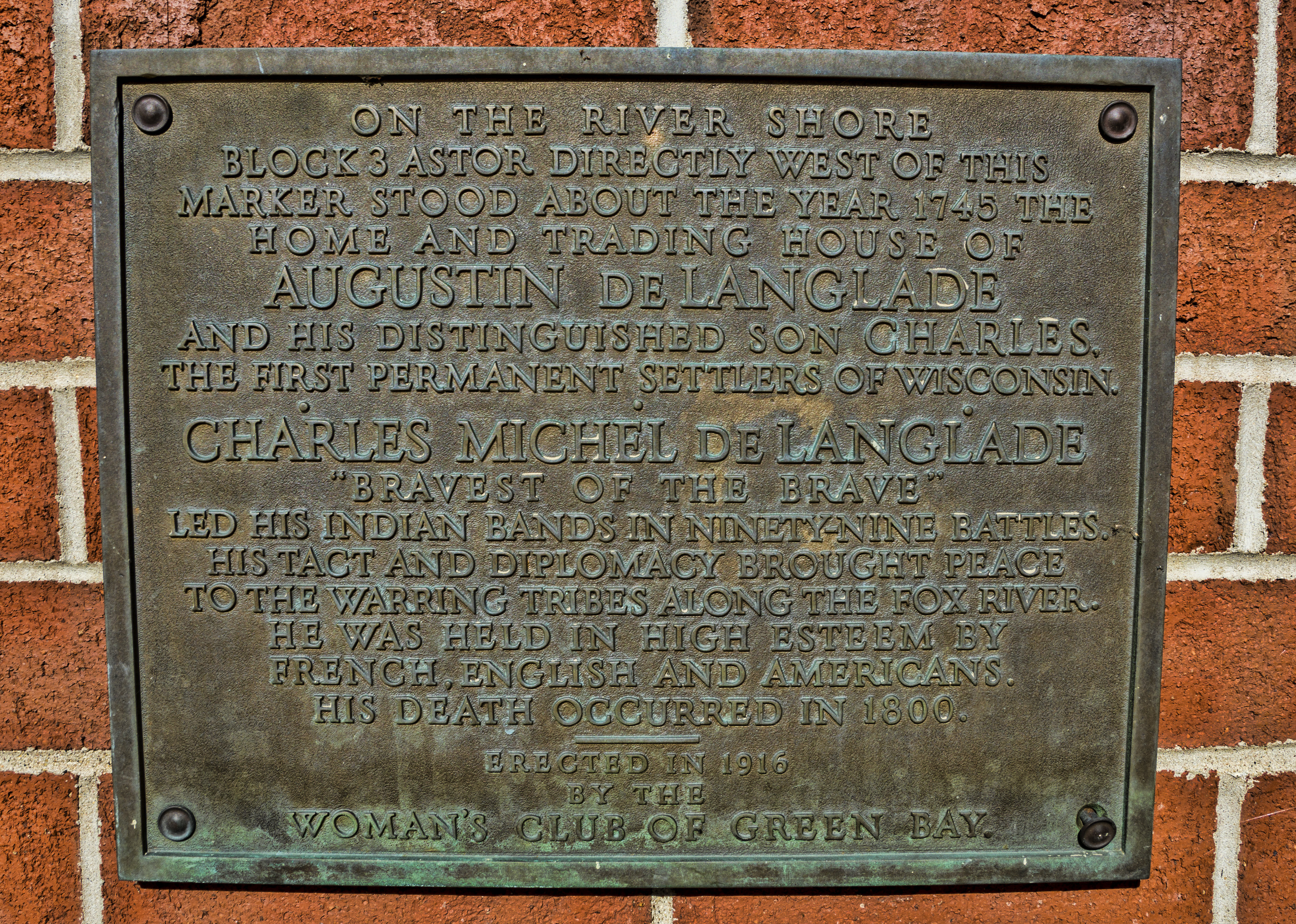
- Plaque in Green Bay, Wisconsin honoring Charles Michel de Langlade and his father. In 1745, Augustin Langlade and his 16-year-old son Charles established a trading post at present-day Green Bay, Wisconsin.
- Born: 9 May 1729; Fort Michilimackinac, Pays d'en Haut, New France
- Died: Winter 1800–1801; La Baye, Northwest Territory, United States
- Military career
- Allegiance: Ojibwa Indian Tribe; Kingdom of France 1729–1761; Great Britain 1761-1800/1801
- Branch: French Marines; British Indian Department
- Service years: 1750–1761; 1763–1800
- Rank: Lieutenant (Marines) 1760; Captain (Indian Department) 1775
- Commands: Commandant of Fort Michilimackinac, 1760–1761
- Conflicts: Raid on Pickawillany; Seven Years' War: Battle of the Monongahela; First Battle on Snowshoes; Battle of Sabbath Day Point; Siege of Fort William Henry; Siege of Quebec; American Revolutionary War: Battle of the Cedars; Saratoga campaign; Battle of St. Louis
- Other work

Charles Michel Mouet de Langlade (9 May 1729 – after 26 July 1801) was a Great Lakes fur trader and war chief who was important in protecting French territory in North America. His mother was Odawa and his father a French Canadian fur trader.

Fluent in Ottawa and French, Langlade later led First Nations forces in warfare in the region. Given the shifting political realities of the time, he and his followers were at various times allied with the French, British and, lastly, Americans. Leading French and Indian forces, in 1752 he destroyed Pickawillany, a Miami village and British trading post in present-day Ohio, where the British and French were competing for control of the lucrative fur trade. During the subsequent Seven Years' War, he helped defend Fort Duquesne (Pittsburgh) against the British. The French appointed Langlade as second in command at Fort Michilimackinac and a captain in the Indian Department of French Canada.

After the defeat of the French in North America, Langlade became allied with the British, who took control of former French possessions and took the lead in the fur trade in the upper West. During the American Revolutionary War, Langlade led Great Lakes Indians for the British against rebel colonists and their Indian allies. The Native Americans hoped to push the American colonizers out of the region. At the end of the war, Langlade retired to his home in Green Bay, Wisconsin. Since he had operated a trading post at Green Bay since 1745 and settled there with his family, he is called the "Father of Wisconsin."

== Early life and education ==
Charles de Langlade was born in 1729 at Fort Michilimackinac, New France to Domitilde, the daughter of an Ottawa chief and sister of Nissowaquet, who became the Ottawa war chief. Charles's father was her second husband, Augustin Langlade (Augustin Mouet, sieur de Langlade), a French-Canadian fur trader. Domitilde was a widow with six children when they married in 1728. Augustin Langlade believed their marriage would provide him an advantage in the fur trade, by giving him a direct connection to the Odawa. The Ottawa were among the Algonquian Anishinaabeg peoples, who inhabited areas around the Great Lakes. As a child, Langlade grew up with Ottawa as his first language and identified with his mother's culture; he was also educated in French by Jesuit missionaries at the fort.

== Life ==
In the winter of 1751–1752, Langlade began assembling a war party of Odawa, Potawatomi, and Ojibwe warriors who traveled to Pickawillany for a raid. They were trying to discourage British trading in the area. In the confrontation on 21 June 1752, the Odawa killed, mutilated and consumed an Englishman and Miami chief Memeskia in a ritual sacrifice. This act aggravated existing tensions and contributed to colonial retaliation against the Odawa, and the French and Indian War (North American front of their Seven Years' War against France in Europe.

In 1755, he led a group from the Three Fires confederacy in the defense of Fort Duquesne (later Pittsburgh), where the French and their Indian allies triumphed over the British Edward Braddock and colonist George Washington at the Battle of the Monongahela. Langlade also took part in the Siege of Fort William Henry. Later he led a group of Ottawa warriors at the Battle of the Plains of Abraham in the defense of Quebec.

In 1757, Langlade was made the second in command of the French forces at Fort Michilimackinac. Langlade surrendered the French forces at that fort to the British Army in 1761. Following the war and victory of Great Britain, Langlade transferred his allegiance to that country after it took control of French areas east of the Mississippi River. The following year he permanently moved with his family to the settlement now known as Green Bay, Wisconsin.

During the American Revolutionary War, Langlade led Great Lakes Indians as an ally of the British commanders in Canada; he was promoted to captain in the Indian Department. At the end of that war, Langlade returned to his home at Green Bay, then considered to be in the United States' Northwest Territory. He resided there until his death some time in the second half of 1801.

== Legacy and honors ==
- Langlade is remembered as the "Father of Wisconsin".
- Langlade County, Wisconsin is named after him.
- The seal of the Langlade County Historical Society bears an image of Langlade, designed by his descendant, "noted sculptor" Sidney Bedore.
- In 2024, a book titled "Auke-wingeke-tawso, or, 'Defender of His Country': The Circumstances & Services of Charles Michel de Langlade" was published.
