= La Laura-Malenga =

Village in Moka District, Mauritius

Coordinates: 20.205°S 57.55°E

La Laura-Malenga is a village in the Moka District in Mauritius. The population was 1,230 in 2000 and was estimated to be 1,336 in 2012. The village got its name "La Laura-Malenga" in 1859. The name came from a 19th-century sugar estate. Le Pouce, the third-highest mountain in Mauritius, is close to this village.

== See also ==
- List of places in Mauritius
