= Miselaine Duval =

Mauritian comedian

Miselaine Duval Vurden
- Born: Miselaine Soobraydoo
- Other name: Maria

Comedy career
- Years active: 1995–present
- Medium: Stand-up, television, film
- Genres: Observational comedy, surreal humor, alternative comedy
- Subjects: pop culture, personal life

Miselaine Duval Vurden is a Mauritian comedian, television producer and writer best known as a cast member of the television series Fami Pa Kontan and Kel Famille. She is the founder of the comedy group Komiko.

== Life and career ==
Miselaine Duval was interested in acting from the age of 12. After completing her studies, she began playing various roles in TV programs and eventually decided to pursue a career as a comedian.

== Television ==
| Year | Title | Role | Notes |
|---|---|---|---|
| 2014 | La Vie Ki Dir | Manuella | Domestic Helper |
| 2012–2013 | Fami Pa Kontan | Marie-Jeanne Bavière | Mother |
| 2008 | Kel Famille | Maria | Main Role |

== See also ==
- Fami Pa Kontan
