= Domitilde =

18th century Anishinaabe Odawa woman

Domitilde (c. 1692–1782, a.k.a. Ouikabe, LaFourche, Nepveu Villeneuve, Mouet) was an Odawa woman of the Nassauakueton doodem. Her father was chief Returning Cloud Kewinaquot and her mother was Nesxesouexite Neskes Mi-Jak-Wa-Ta-Wa. Her brother was Nissowaquet, also known as La Fourche. She lived near Michilimackinac, where the Jesuits had very few converts to Catholicism, Domitilde being one of the few.

In 1712, she married Daniel Villeneuve, a French courer des bois with whom she had seven Métis children. Villeneuve died in 1724, and soon after Domitilde married Augustin Langlade, giving birth to Charles Michel de Langlade in 1729. Domitilde went on to become the godmother of dozens of French, Métis, and Anishinaabe children and adults, a number of whom were enslaved, at least one to her.

Domitilde's position within the Anishinaabe, Catholic, and fur trading communities created powerful alliances for her brother Nissowaquet and her son Charles. Her marriages were especially important because there were relatively few Anishinaabe–French marriages at the time.
