= Augustin Langlade =

Augustin Mouet, sieur de Langlade, (with a number of name variations) (1703 – c. 1771), was born in Trois-Rivières, Quebec. He was the son of Pierre Mouet, sieur de Moras.

Augustin obtained a fur trading license at Michilimackinac in 1728. That year he married Domitilde, a widow with six children, who was the daughter of an Odawa chief and the sister to another. This strengthened his standing in the area. He was largely responsible for the establishment of the fur trading outpost that became Green Bay, Wisconsin. In 1728 he also fought in the Fox Wars together with François-Marie Le Marchand de Lignery.

Augustin was a Canadian fur trader in that region. His son, Charles Michel de Langlade, was also involved in fur trading, and was a leader in the French and Indian Wars.
