= France 1 =

France 1 may refer to:

- FR-1 (satellite), a French satellite also known as France 1
- France 1 (ship) a weather ship preserved at La Rochelle
- Outre-Mer 1ère, a France Télévisions network
- TF1, French TV network privatized in 1987
