= Nissowaquet =

18th-century Anishinaabe Odawa leader

Nissowaquet (c. 1715–1797, also known as La Fourche) was an Odawa leader of the Nassauakueton doodem. His father was chief Returning Cloud Kewinaquot and his mother was Nesxesouexite Neskes Mi-Jak-Wa-Ta-Wa. He grew up in Michilimackinac and moved 20 miles (32 km) to L'Arbre Croche with around 180 warriors in 1741.

One of his sisters was Domtilde, who was twice married to French traders and gave birth to the Métis leader Charles Michel de Langlade Through his sister and his nephew, Nissowaquet developed strong ties to the French in the pays d'en haut, and in the 1750s, Nissowaquet and his warriors went east with Langlade to fight with the French against the British.

In 1764, Nissowaquet attended a peace conference at Niagara (near Youngstown, N.Y.), where he promised allegiance to the British.
