= MBC 2 (Mauritian TV channel) =

Public broadcaster of the Republic of Mauritius

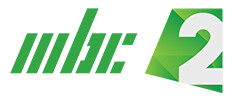
- Logo of MBC 2
- Country: Mauritius
- Broadcast area: Mauritius, Rodrigues, Agaléga
- Headquarters: Moka, Moka District

Programming
- Languages: French, English, Creole, Hindi
- Picture format: 576i (16:9 and 4:3) (SDTV), 1080i (HDTV)

History
- Replaced by: MBC 1 MBC 3 MBC 4 MBC Sat; YSTV; Ciné 12; Kids Channel; Bhojpuri Channel; Senn Kreol

Links
- Website: www.mbc.mu/mbc2

Availability

Terrestrial
- Analog: VHF/UHF band (Analog signals terminated on 17 June 2015)
- MCML: 1

MBC 2 is a television channel of the Mauritius Broadcasting Corporation (MBC) in Mauritius. It was launched as the second TV channel in Mauritius on 30 July 1990 after the MBC 1. The channel broadcasts shows and movies in the major ancestral languages spoken in Mauritius, such as Hindi, Tamil, Telugu, Marathi, Urdu and Mandarin, among others.

== Programming ==
=== Block Programme ===
- Samachar
- Zournal

=== English ===
- Santa Diabla

=== Hindi ===
- CID
- Piya Rangrezz
- Saat Phere
- Bahu Hamari Rajni Kant
- Mahabharat
- Santoshi Maa

=== Tamil ===
- Thiru Mangalyam
- Lakshmi Vanthachu
- Deepangal
- Shenbagam
- Masala Kudumpam
- Siva Ragasiyam

== See also ==
- Kids Channel (Mauritian TV channel)
- List of television channels in Mauritius
- Media of Mauritius
- List of Shows Broadcast by the Mauritius Broadcasting Corporation
