= Ciné 12 =

Public broadcaster of the Republic of Mauritius

Ciné TV
- Country: Mauritius
- Headquarters: Mauritius, Moka

Programming
- Picture format: 576i (SDTV 16:9, 4:3), 1080i (HDTV)

Ownership
- Owner: Mauritius Broadcasting Corporation
- Sister channels: MBC 1 MBC 2 MBC 3 BTV; MBC Sat; YSTV; Senn Kreol; Kids Channel; Bhojpuri Channel

History
- Launched: 19 February 2008
- Closed: 3 April 2023
- Former names: Movie Channel (2008-2011); Ciné 12 (2011-2020)

Links
- Website: http://www.mbcradio.tv/mbc/cine12

Ciné 12 was a television channel, owned by the Mauritius Broadcasting Corporation, the national state broadcaster. Launched in 2008, Ciné 12 used to broadcast French and English TV shows and films.

On 19 February 2008, MBC launched two new thematic channels, Sports Channel, and Movie Channel.

On 12 September 2011, Ciné 12 replaced Movie Channel. On 12 November 2020, Ciné 12 was rebranded as Ciné TV.

On 3 April 2023, MBC channels were rebranded and reorganized as part of its digital transformation with at least 4 HD channels, and MBC 1 had a refocus on series and movies, while Ciné 12 was replaced by MBC 5 which is dedicated to children and documentary.

== See also ==
- Kids Channel (Mauritian TV channel)
- MBC 1 (Mauritian TV channel)
- MBC 2 (Mauritian TV channel)
