= Triple Z (TV series) =

- Written by: Thibaut Chatel; Franck Bertrand; Jacqueline Monsigny
- Directed by: Thibaut Chatel
- Country of origin: France
- Original language: French
- No. of episodes: 52

Production
- Producers: AB Productions; Studio Animage
- Running time: 26 minutes

Original release
- Network: TF1
- Release: September 4, 1999 – April 28, 2001

Triple Z is a French cartoon that aired during 1999 and 2001. It was rerun on an Italian channel in 2005. It was also aired on the German Super RTL channel in 2002. The show had around 52 episodes in total.

The show was produced by Studio Animage.

== Synopsis ==
Through no fault of their own, Zero and Zanzibar, the Pompeii amphitheater's star gladiators, find themselves transported into the future onto a Hollywood lot right in the middle of the shoot of a Hercules movie. There, they meet Zazie and, with her, they become LA's hottest stunt team: the "Triple Z." In the air or full fathom deep, on land or on sea, heavy duty stuntmen Zazie, Zero and Zanzibar eschew no risk for the greater glory of the silver screen. Their names figure on the credits of every major blockbuster.

== Episodes ==
- The Great Journey
- Ghost City
- The Secret Of The Magic Shield
- The Proconsul's Diamonds
- The Real Face Of The Ratapok
- The Barnabos Circus
- At Frankenstein's Attack
- The Prisoner Of Costa Pueblo
- SwaiLING In Hawaii
- Cleopatra's Tomb
- Drama In The High Mountains
- Traquenard In Las Vegas
- Cannonball
- The Night Of The Oscars
- Cratero
- See You At The White House
- The Forbidden Valley
- The Bus In Madness
- The Star Has Disappeared
- Trap In The Air
- Ratapokus And Lenfera
- The Three Bison Ranch
- Palace On Fire
- The Pirate's Castle
- To The Rescue Of Jessica
- The Adventures Of The Sphinx
- The Cursed Tournament
- The Rescue of Aquarius 5
- Cleopatra's Nose
- Flight 421 In Danger
- Broadway Melody
- The Ghost Of Carnegie
- Special Agent 777
- The Queen's Ferrets
- The Missing Of Beverly Hills
- Gloriane Grant's Wedding
- But What Happened To Zazie?
- To Each His Own Story
- The Earth Trembles In Frisco
- The Stolen Statuette
- Pollution Alert
- Titanic II
- The Silver Mask
- Men In White
- The Return Of Zorro
- Halloween In Hollywood
- Mistigri And Mistigri
- The Gala Of The Stars
- The Game Of Truth
- The King Of The Jungle
- Bank Route At Vertigo
- Madness In Hollywood
