= Moka Range =

Mountain range in Mauritius

Coordinates: 20°12′0″S 57°31′30″E

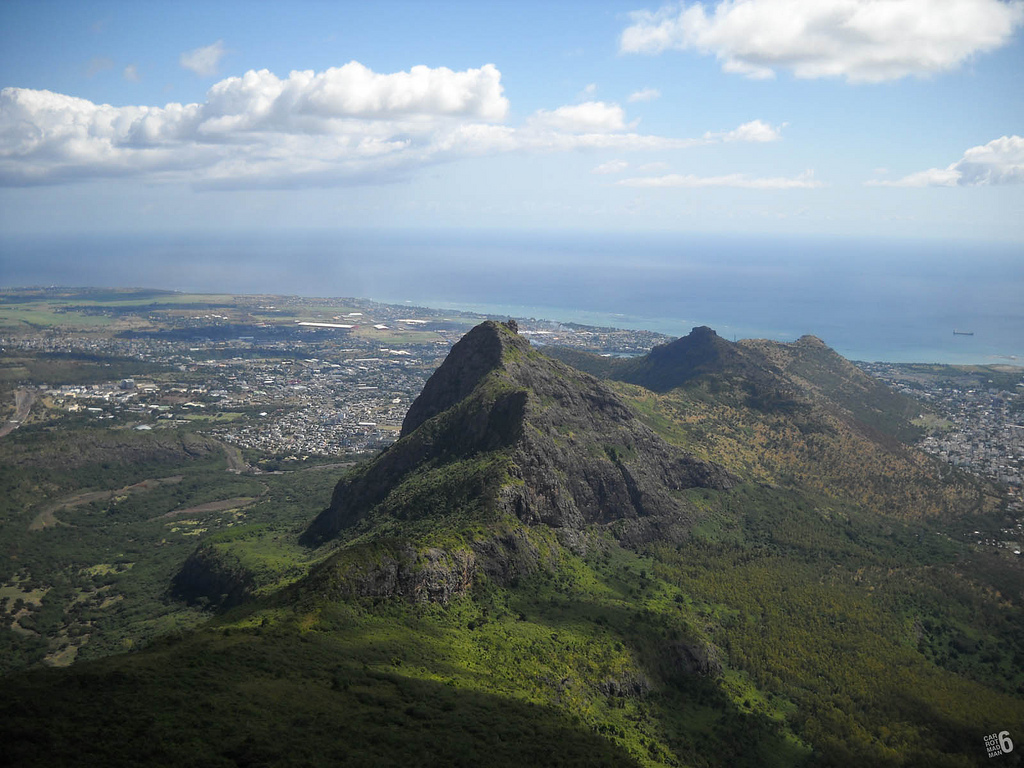
Part of the Moka Range seen from the summit of Le Pouce

The Moka Range is a mountain range in Mauritius. It contains two of Mauritius's three tallest peaks, Pieter Both and Le Pouce. It was formed from a basalt lava dome ten million years ago. The Moka Range forms a semicircle around the capital of Mauritius, Port Louis.
