= Senn Kreol =

Public broadcaster of the Republic of Mauritius

- Country: Mauritius
- Broadcast area: Mauritius, Rodrigues, Agaléga
- Headquarters: Moka, Moka District

Programming
- Languages: French, Creole
- Picture format: 576i (16:9 and 4:3) (SDTV), 1080i (HDTV)

Ownership
- Owner: Mauritius Broadcasting Corporation
- Sister channels: MBC 1 MBC 2 MBC 3 BTV; MBC Sat; YSTV; Ciné 12; Kids Channel; Bhojpuri Channel

History
- Launched: January 30, 2013
- Closed: 3 April 2023

Links
- Website: www.mbcradio.tv/mbc/K-channel

Availability

Terrestrial
- MCML: 6

Senn Kreol (In English: Creole Channel, French: Chaîne Créole) was a television channel in Mauritius. Owned by the Mauritius Broadcasting Corporation, which is the national state broadcaster, the channel was launched on 30 January 2013.

On 3 April 2023, MBC rebranded and reorganized its channels, and MBC 2 became a predominantly Creole channel shared with other programming. MBC 17 is now simulcasting TiVi5Monde.

== Programming ==
- 2 Kouzin Sek
- Ti Gale
- Refle Nou Zil
- Itinerer
- Itinerer Rodrig
- Dossier Senn Kreol
- Sports Moris
- Balad dan Villaz
- Valer Artis
- Arsiv MBC
- Klip Kompil (Musical Show)
- Bonzour Nu Zil
- Kitikoui
- Lavi Zoli en XXL
- Morisien Kone Ou Drwa ek Devoir
- Etre Femme
- Memwar Nu Zanset
- Beauty Queen
- Morisien Kone Ou La Santé
- Mazavarou (Seychellois cooking show from SBC)
- Kapatya (Seychellois discovery show from SBC)
- Knockout (Seychellois show from SBC)
- Tremolo (Seychellois show from SBC)
