= Piton de la Petite Rivière Noire =

Mountain in Mauritius

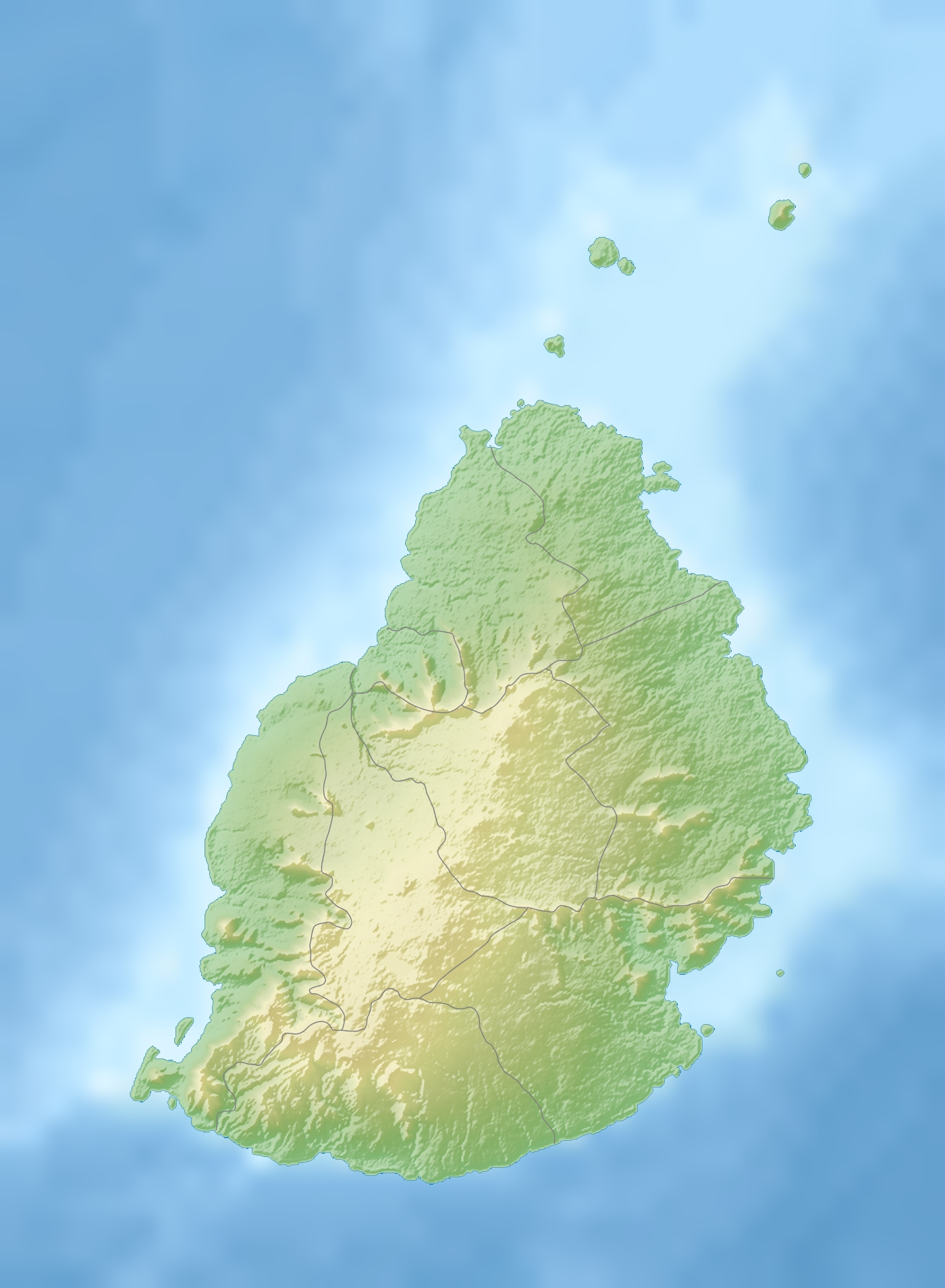
- Location within Mauritius

Highest point
- Elevation: 828 m (2,717 ft)
- Prominence: 828 m (2,717 ft)
- Listing: Country high point
- Coordinates: 20°24′S 57°28′E

Geography
- Location: Mauritius

Geology
- Mountain type: Hill

Piton de la Petite Rivière Noire (Little Black River Peak) is the highest mountain on the island of Mauritius, in the Indian Ocean. Located in the Rivière Noire District and rising to a height of 828 m (2,717 ft) above sea level, it forms part of the Black River mountain range.

There are two other main mountain ranges in Mauritius: Moka-Port Louis and Grand Port-Savanne. The Moka-Port Louis range includes Pieter Both (820 m) and Le Pouce (812 m) mountains, the second and third highest summits respectively. Both are more famous than Piton de la Petite Rivière Noire in the southwest.

The summit of Piton de la Petite Riviere Noire can be reached by various paths, the most common route is from Plaine Champagne, however there are routes from Chamarel and also from the Black River Gorges Visitors centre. On the summit there is a bench called "Bench 828".
