= Pieter Both (mountain) =

Second highest mountain of Mauritius

- Peter Botte Mountain
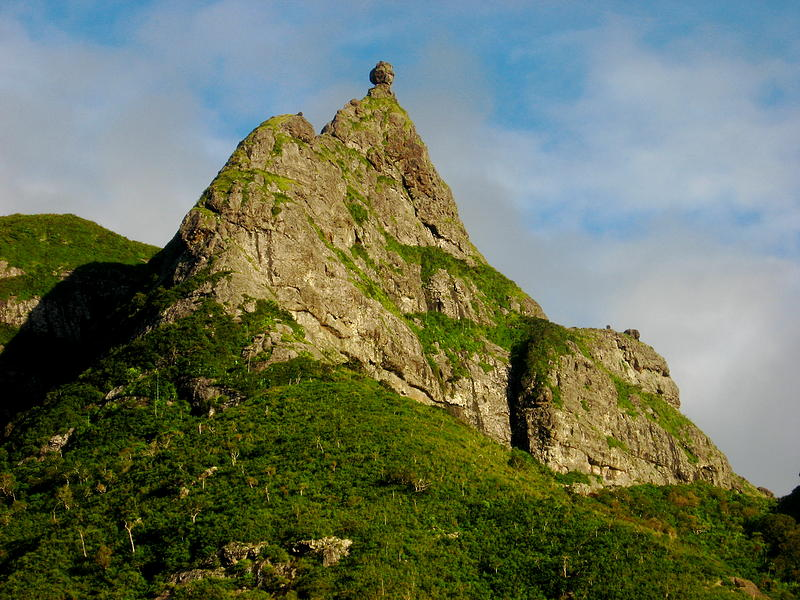
- Pieter Both Mountain in 2009

Highest point
- Elevation: 820 m (2,690 ft)
- Prominence: 820 m (2,690 ft)
- Listing: Country high point
- Coordinates: 20.1923°S 57.5552°E

Geography
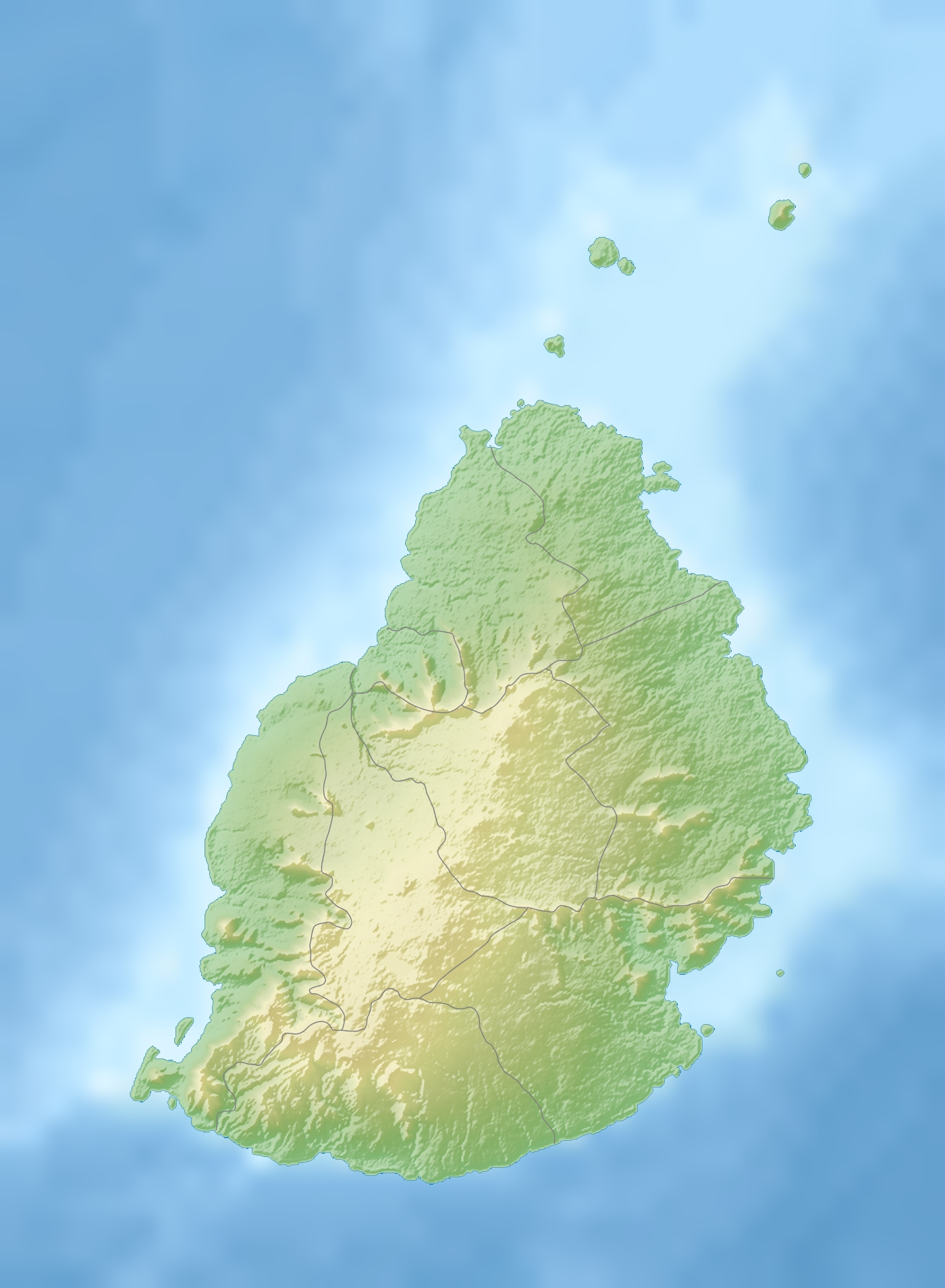
- Location within Mauritius
- Location: Mauritius, East Africa

Climbing
- First ascent: 7 September 1832 by

Pieter Both, sometimes referred to as Peter Botte Mountain, is the second highest mountain of Mauritius, at 820 metres (2,690 ft) tall. The mountain is slightly shorter than Piton de la Petite Rivière Noire by eight metres. It is named after Pieter Both, the first Governor-General of the Dutch East Indies. It is located in the Moka Range.

The notable feature of this mountain is the gigantic rock formation at the very top of it, which resembles a human head. The palm species Hyophorbe amaricaulis, famous for being the world's rarest palm today, was once a common sight on this mountain.

The first ascent of Pieter Both was by Captain Lloyd, Lieutenant Phillpotts, of the 29th Reg., Lieutenant Keppel, R.N., and Lieutenant Taylor on 7 September 1832.

To climb the mountain following the main ridge takes about an hour, and is mildly difficult. It is mainly a scramble, and being exposed, a rope is advised. The dramatic boulder on the pinnacle is about nine metres in diameter, and has several iron spikes fixed to it to aid climbing to the top. The top is flat and about two metres across.

== Gallery ==
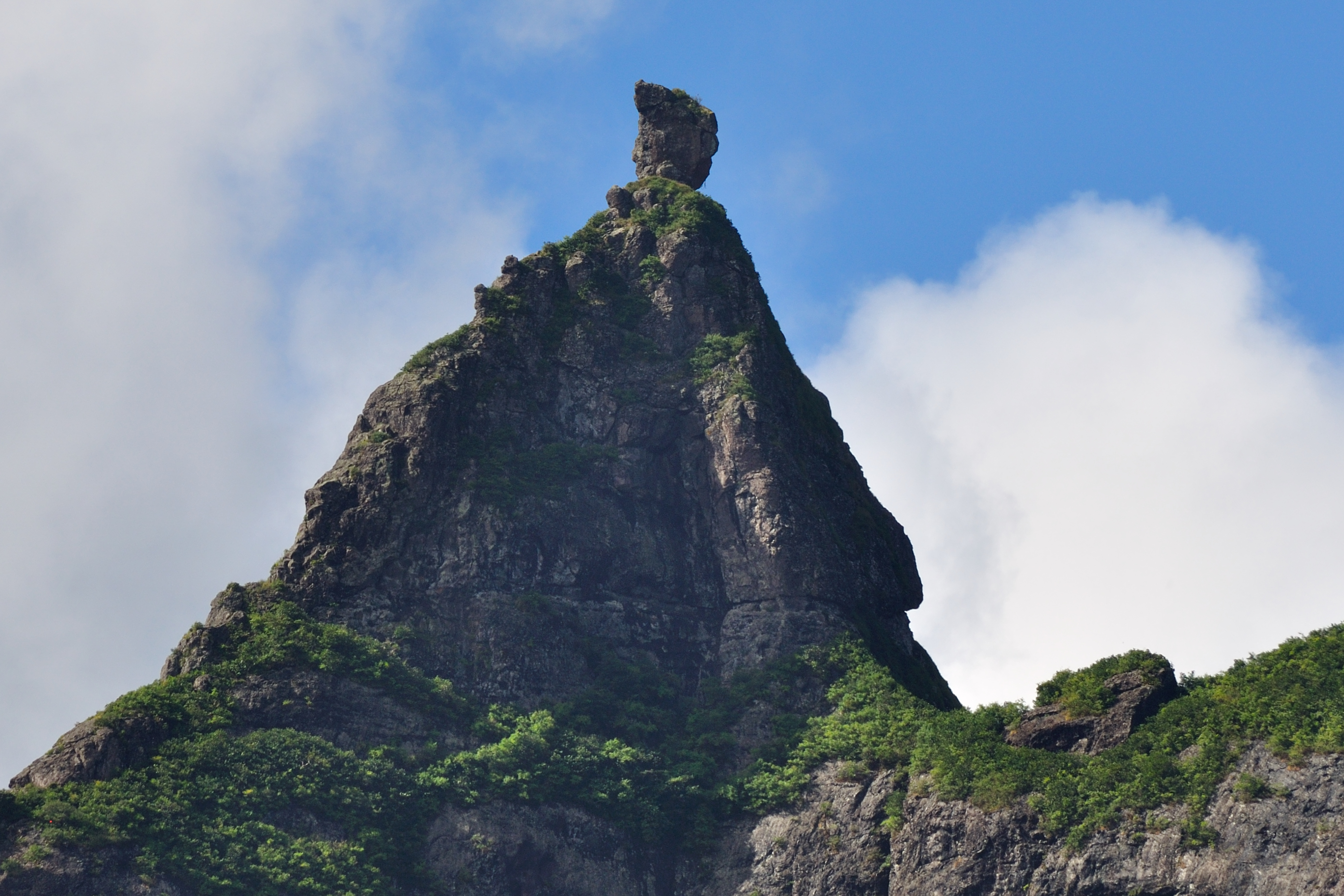
Mauritius Port Louis Vallée des Prêtres

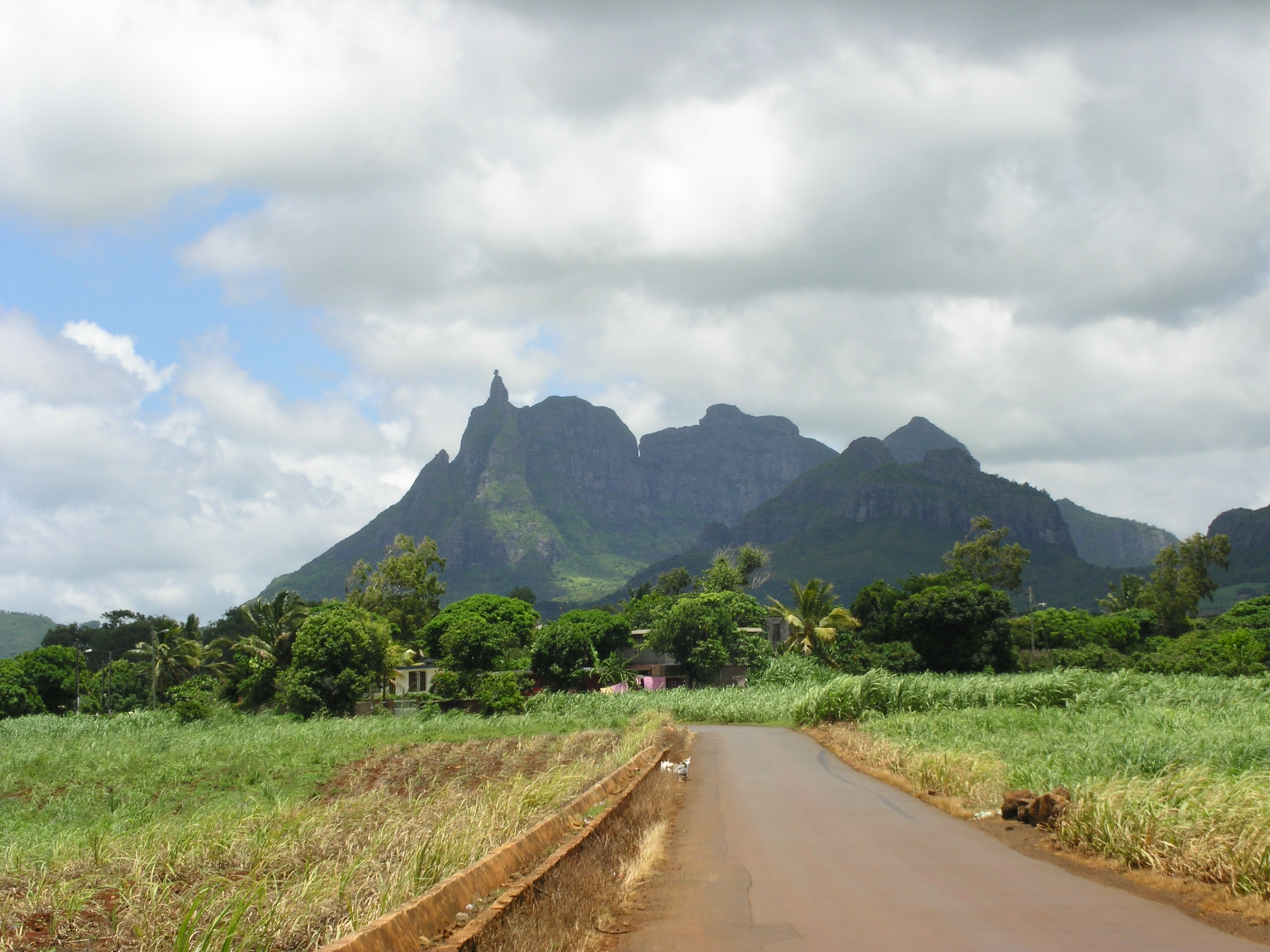
Mountains - panoramio - pyraniton

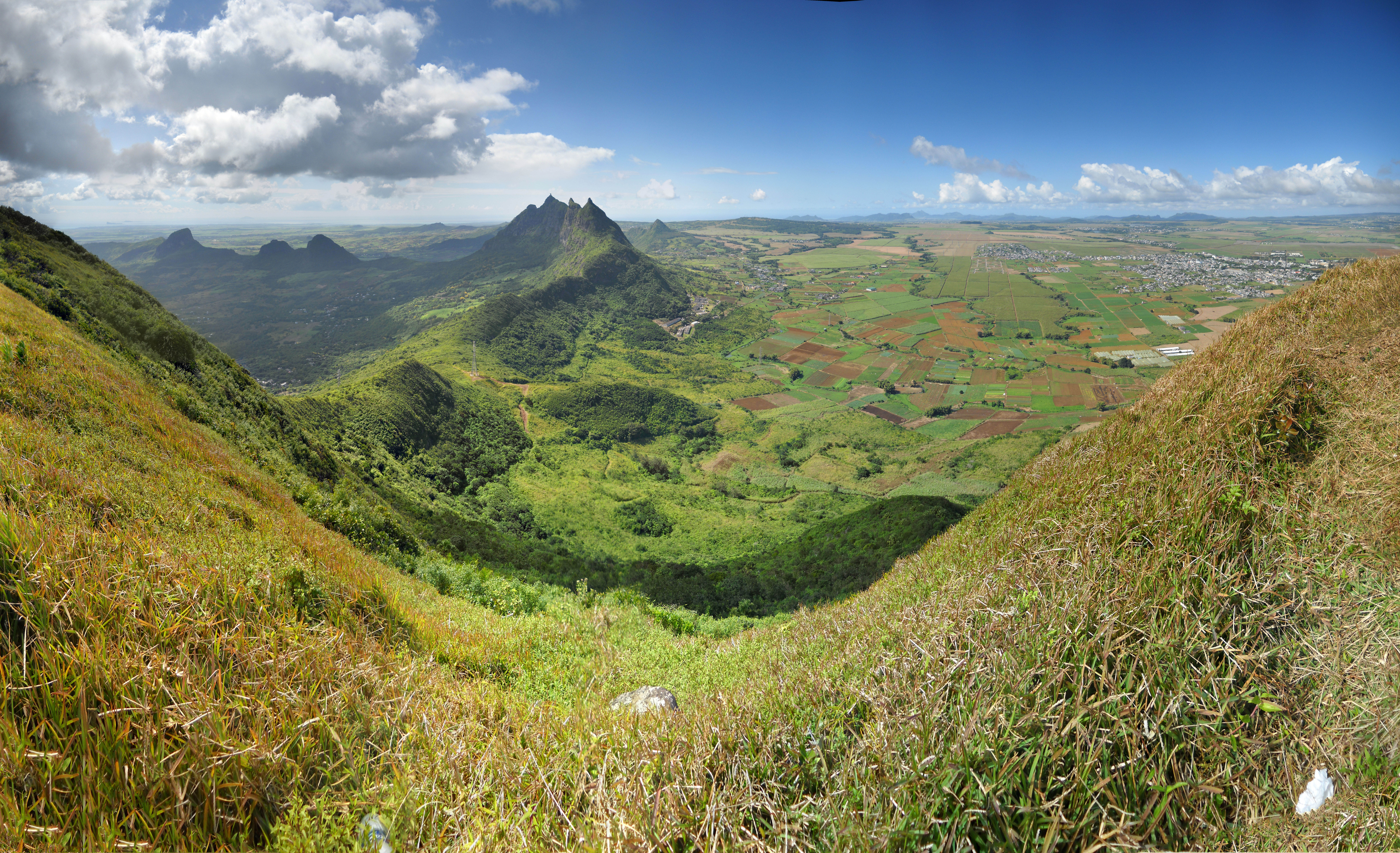
Pieter Both

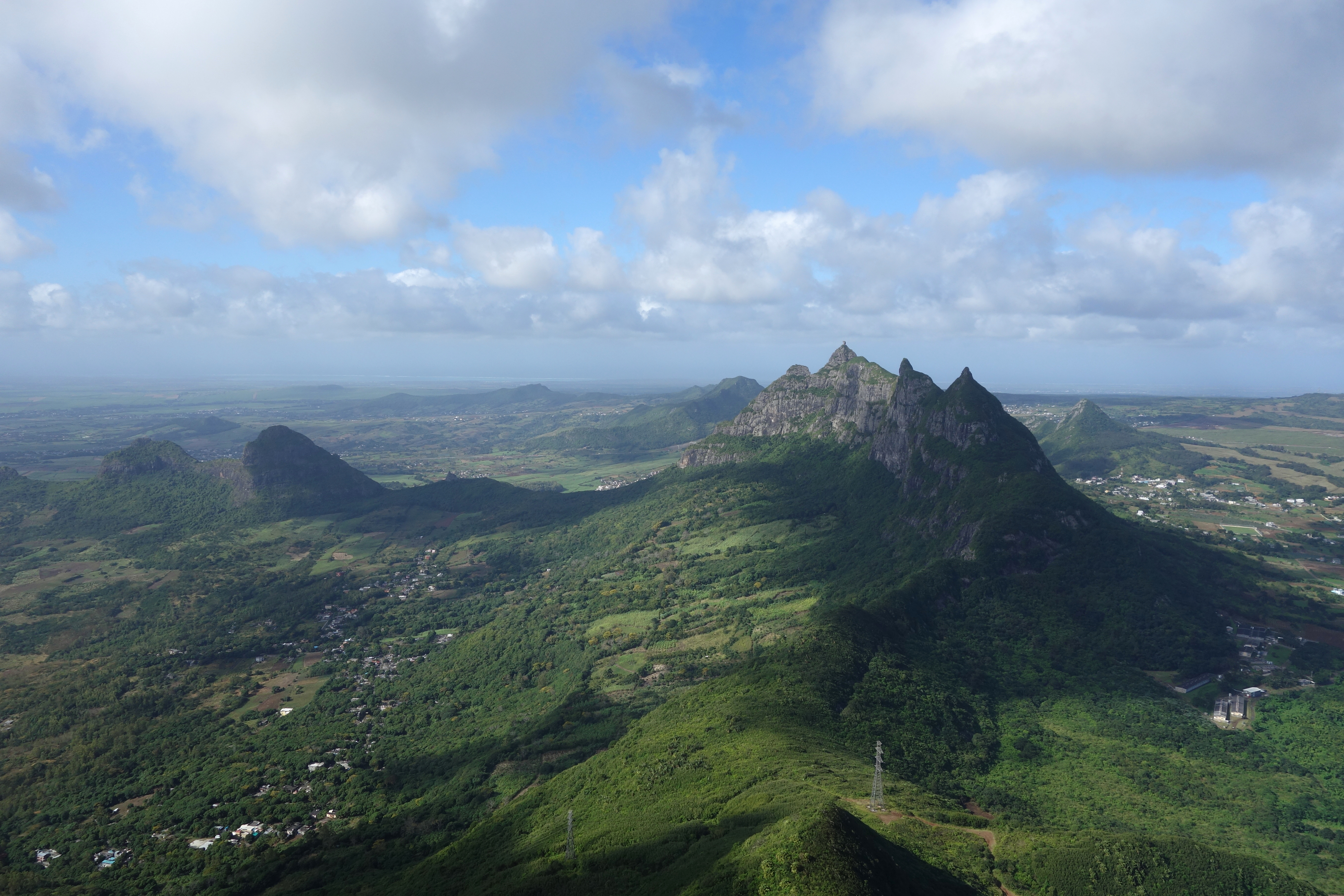
View from Le Pouce facing Pieter Both
