= Mauritius Broadcasting Corporation =

Public broadcaster of the Republic of Mauritius

Mauritius Broadcasting Corporation (MBC)
- Type: Broadcast television, broadcast radio, internet website and streaming media
- Country: Mauritius
- Availability: Nationwide
- Founded: 8 June 1964 by Sir Seewoosagur Ramgoolam
- Headquarters: Moka, Mauritius
- Broadcast area: Mauritius, Rodrigues, Agaléga; Worldwide (online with restricted programming)
- Owner: Government of Mauritius
- Key people: Alain Gordon-Gentil (16 December 2024)
- Former names: Mauritius Broadcasting Service
- Official website: www.mbc.mu

The Mauritius Broadcasting Corporation (MBC) is the national state broadcaster of the Republic of Mauritius, that is the islands of Mauritius, Rodrigues, and Agaléga. The historical headquarters in Curepipe were relocated in Réduit, Moka. It also operates a station in Rodrigues. The MBC programmes are broadcast in 12 languages, notably French, Creole, English, Hindi, Urdu, Bhojpuri, Tamil, Telugu, Marathi, Mandarin/Cantonese, and Hakka. MBC provides 17 television channels in Mauritius, four in Rodrigues and two in Agaléga, as well as seven radio channels.

== History ==
The MBC was established as a body corporate on 8 June 1964 under the Mauritius Broadcasting Corporation Ordinance no. 7 (1964). Previously, it operated as a government service under the name of Mauritius Broadcasting Service.

The original ordinance establishing the Mauritius Broadcasting Corporation was amended and consolidated by Acts of Parliament: Act no. 65 of 1970, Act no. 22 of 1982, and Act no. 65 of 1985. These amendments were necessary to accommodate, inter alia, changes at both technological and social levels as well as to satisfy the aspirations of all segments of the Mauritian nation.

TV broadcasts started on a pilot basis in 1964 with the installation of three repeater stations at Fort George, Mount Thérése, and Jurançon. On 8 February 1965, television was officially launched with a daily evening transmission of about three hours. The first live local program was broadcast on the occasion of the visit of Princess Alexandra in 1968.

The phasing out process of black and white television started in 1973 and indeed the OCAMM Conference which was held at the Mahatma Gandhi Institute in the same year was broadcast live in colour (SECAM system). By 1978 the MBC was fully equipped for the broadcast of colour programs. The MBC started its operation in Rodrigues on 7 November 1987. A second channel was launched on 30 July 1990, the MBC 2. The MBC 3 became operational in March 1996.

In 2005, the MBC became the first public television broadcaster in Africa to launch Digital Terrestrial Television channels. In 2007, the MBC also extended its digitalized service to the islands of Rodrigues and Agaléga. In 2011, the MBC moved from its former headquarters in Forest Side, Curepipe to Moka. The Bhojpuri Channel and Senn Kreol were launched in January 2013.

In 2012, the President of the Republic stated that the MBC is run with a mindset of unfairness, partiality, and is not worthy of a democratic nation.

On 14 November 2016, MBC rebranded the logo of its 17 channels and introduced a standardised logo with different colour variations for each channel. Additionally, new onscreen graphics were introduced.

MBC broadcasts many of its own shows, promoting the country and the physical and mental health of the people of Mauritius.

On 1 December 2016, the MBC released the MBC play app, which is still under development, on the Google Play Store, allowing users around the globe to stream live TV and radio channels of the corporation. Later, after releasing a stable version, this app is also expected to be available through the Apple App Store.

== Overview ==
The MBC operates under the aegis of the Prime Minister's Office. It is established as a body corporate under Act No. 7 of 1964. According to the provisions of the Act, its main objectives are to provide independent and impartial broadcasting services of information, education, culture, and entertainment in different languages taught or spoken in the country, and to ensure that the broadcasting services cater for the aspirations, needs, and tastes of the population in the matters of information, education, culture, and entertainment. Opposition parties and media commentators often criticise the MBC for pro-government bias. The MBC is a member of the Association des Radios et Télévisions de l’Océan Indien (ARTOI), Commonwealth Broadcasting Association, and an associate member at the European Broadcasting Union, the Asia-Pacific Broadcasting Union, and the South African Broadcasting Association and of the Conseil International des Radios-Télévisions d’Expression Française.

The MBC has been criticized for being the propaganda arm of the ruling party.

== List of MBC channels ==
=== Television ===
Initial name	Date launched	Rebrand	Notes
MBC 1	8 June 1964	None	
MBC 2	30 July 1990	None	
MBC 3	March 1996	None	
MBC 4	February 2011	BTV	
MBC 11	Rebranded to YSTV on 18 April 2019	Sports 11	2011
Ciné 12	2019	Ciné Tv	
Knowledge Channel	18 September 2007	Kids Channel	Closed on 31 January 2015
Senn Kreol	30 January 2013	None	
Bhojpuri Channel	30 January 2013	None	
MBC Sat	November 13, 2014	None	

=== Radio ===
Initial name	Rebrand	Date launched	Frequency	Notes
Radio Maurice	None	1944	684 kHz (North), 684 kHz (South), 684 kHz (East), 684 kHz (Centre)	
Radio Mauritius	None	Not known	819 kHz (North), 819 kHz (South), 819 kHz (East), 819 kHz (Centre)	
Best FM (Mauritius)	None	October 2010	103.5MHz (North), 96.4 MHz (South), 96.4 MHz (East/West), 99.4 MHz (Center)	
RM1	None	Dec 1989	91.7 MHz (North), 89.3 MHz (South), 91.7 MHz (East), 97.3 MHz (Centre)	Kool FM rebranded to RM1 16th June 2025
Music FM	NRJ Maurice	14 May 2018	92.7 MHz (North), 94.9 MHz (South), 94.9 MHz (East), 90.8 MHz (Centre)	
Taal FM	None	Aug 1995	98.2 MHz (North), 95.6 MHz (South), 94.0 MHz (Centre)	
Rodrigues FM	None	Not known		

=== MBC Board Members ===
1) Dr Amaresh Singh Ramlugan, Chairperson of MBC Board

2) Mrs Marie Joelle Sandrine Valere, Board Member, Representative of Prime Minister's Office

3) Mr Lutchmeeparsad Ramdhun, Board Member, Representative of Government Information Services

4) Professor (Dr) Rajcoomaree Issur (Mrs), Board Member

5) Dr Roukaya Kasenally (Mrs), Board Member

6) Mrs Anne Robert, Board Member

Director-General

Mr Henri Alain Gordon-Gentil, CSK

Link to the MBC Board Members : https://www.mbc.mu/corporate#Conseil_direction

== See also ==
- MBC 1 (Mauritian TV channel)
- MBC 2 (Mauritian TV channel)
- MBC 3 (Mauritian TV channel)
- MBC 4 (Mauritian TV Channel)
- Kids Channel (Mauritian TV channel)
- Media of Mauritius
