= List of programs broadcast by the Mauritius Broadcasting Corporation =

The Mauritius Broadcasting Corporation has been broadcasting shows from various parts to cater all languages in the multicultural country Mauritius. Shows in different languages are being broadcasting by MBC.

== List of shows broadcast from India ==
=== Currently broadcasting fictional shows ===
- Anupamaa
- Bade Achhe Lagte Hain
- Bin Kuch Kahe
- Yeh Teri Galiyan
- Agniphera
- Mere Sai – Shraddha Aur Saburi
- Kundali Bhagya
- RadhaKrishn
- Ishaaron Ishaaron Mein
- Bhakharwadi
- Siddhi Vinayak
- Motu Patlu
- Naagin 2
- Siya Ke Ram
- ViR: The Robot Boy

=== Bhojpuri ===
- Hamara Gaon Hamara Desh

=== Marathi ===
- Asambhav
- Aabhalmaya
- Eka Lagnachi Dusri Goshta

=== Telugu ===
- Pellinati Pramanulu
- Kalavari Kodallu
- Brindavanam
- Chinna Papa Periya Papa

=== Tamil ===
- Kalyana parisu
- Manaivi

=== Currently broadcasting non-fictional shows ===
- Dance Plus (season 5)

=== Formerly broadcast fiction shows (Used to broadcast) ===
==== Hindi ====
- Ek Hazaaron Mein Meri Behna Hai
- Iss Pyaar Ko Kya Naam Doon?
- Iss Pyaar Ko Kya Naam Doon?...Ek Baar Phir
- Itna Karo Na Mujhe Pyaar
- Kaleerein
- Bairi Piya
- Laagi Tujhse Lagan
- Pardes Mein Hai Mera Dil
- Ek Tha Raja Ek Thi Rani
- Teen Bahuraaniyaan
- Mrs. Kaushik Ki Paanch Bahuein
- Shastri Sisters
- Kyunki Saas Bhi Kabhi Bahu Thi
- Bahu Hamari Rajni Kant
- Pyaar Ka Dard Hai Meetha Meetha Pyaara Pyaara
- Tashan-e-Ishq
- Dahleez
- Meri Aashiqui Tum Se Hi
- Kalash – Ek Vishwaas
- Jaana Na Dil Se Door
- Piya Rangrezz
- Hitler Didi
- Tu Mera Hero
- Yahan Main Ghar Ghar Kheli
- Saraswatichandra
- Jai Jai Jai Bajrang Bali
- Devon Ke Dev...Mahadev
- Satrangi Sasural
- Yeh Kahan Aa Gaye Hum
- Bhaage Re Mann
- Yeh Vaada Raha
- Mahabharat
- Gangaa
- Karn Sangini
- Dance Plus (season 1)
- Dance Plus (season 2)
- Dance Plus (season 3)
- Dance Plus (season 4)
- Nach Baliye
- Dil Hai Hindustani
- The Great Indian Laughter Challenge
- Dancing Queen
- Beyhadh
- Suhani Si Ek Ladki
- Mere Angne Mein
- Yeh Un Dinon Ki Baat Hai
- Kahaani Ghar Ghar Kii
- Kumkum Bhagya
- Yeh Hai Mohabbatein
- Yeh Pyaar Nahi Toh Kya Hai
- Mahabharat
- Kullfi Kumarr Bajewala
- Ek Rishta Saajhedari Ka
- Piyaa Albela
- Pavitra Rishta
- Punar Vivah – Ek Nayi Umeed
- Geet – Hui Sabse Parayi

== List of shows broadcast from Pakistan ==
=== Currently broadcasting shows ===
- Tawaan

=== Former broadcasting fictional shows ===
- Nikhar Gaye Gulab Sare
- Kisi Ko Maan Liya Apna
- Meray Qatil Meray Dildar
- Meri Jaan
- Ishq Gumshuda
- Aik Thi Misaal
- Tum Mere Paas Raho
- Sangat (TV series)

== List of shows from Europe and Western countries ==
=== Currently broadcasting fictional shows ===
- Un Palace Pour Deux (in French)
- Homeland season 3
- Against the Wall
- Fringe season 4
- Scandal 2
- The Good Wife season 4
- Hawaii 5-0 season 4
- Nikita
- Rosario
- Bones season 9
- Grimm
- Salvation
- Sanctuary
- The Blacklist
- The Mentalist
- Chicago Med
- White Collar (TV series)
- Dexter (TV series)
- Sons of Anarchy
- The Secret Circle (TV series)
- Revenge (TV series)
- The Magicians (American TV series)
- Being Human (British TV series)
- Psych
- Counterpart (TV series)
- Supernatural (American TV series)
- Charmed
- The Vampire Diaries

=== Currently broadcasting non-fictional shows ===
- Des chiffres et des lettres
- Envoyé spécial
- Thalassa

== List of shows from Eastern Asian countries ==
=== Currently broadcasting fictional show ===
- Happy Noodle
