= Moka =

- Villages
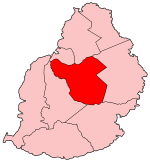
- Moka District

- Moka's location in Mauritius
- Coordinates: 20.219°S 57.496°E
- Country: Mauritius
- Districts: Moka District
- Elevation: 203 m (666 ft)
- Highest elevation: 425 m (1,394 ft)

Population (October 2011)
  - Total: 8,846
  - Density: 507.2/km^{2} (1,314/sq mi)
- Time zone: UTC+4 (Mauritius Time)
- Area code: 230
- ISO 3166 code: MU
- Climate: Am

Moka (Mauritian Creole pronunciation: [moka]) is a village in Mauritius located mainly in the Moka District. The western part of the village lies in the Plaines Wilhems District. Since 1967, it has formed part of Constituency No. 8 Quartier Militaire and Moka. The village is administered by the Moka Village Council under the aegis of the Moka District Council.

According to the 2011 census by Statistics Mauritius, the population was 8,846. The elevation is 203 meters and can be up to 425 meters in some places. Moka is directly on the other side of the Moka Range from Port Louis. The village is close to the mountain Le Pouce and the town Beau-Bassin Rose-Hill. Réduit is a suburb of the village where the State House and University of Mauritius is situated. The village is also home to the Mauritius Broadcasting Corporation and the Mahatma Gandhi Institute.

== History ==
Reza Shah, the exiled Shah of Iran, lived in Moka from 1941 to 1942 under the supervision of the British colonial authorities. He resided at Valory, a historic three-storey villa. As of 2023 the decrepit château was still an Iranian property, which the Iranian government has refused to sell.

=== Housing boom ===
Moka is centrally located in Mauritius and as such has experienced a real estate development boom in the past few years. This was mainly encouraged by the development of the CyberCity two kilometres away in Ebene. Another contributing factor to this property business was that since Mauritius will not benefit from preferential prices for its sugar by the European Community and World Trade Organization, sugar estates quickly started real estate business units that would convert the land under sugar cane culture to residential lands. From 2004 to 2006, Moka saw five property estate developments.

== Weather ==
Moka has a tropical wet climate. Since it is in the Southern Hemisphere, February is the warmest month and August is the coolest. Temperatures normally can range from 28 °C (82 °F) in February to 15 °C (59 °F) at night in August. The dry season is in October, the wet season is in February. Temperature is somewhat constant.

== Places ==
=== Schools ===
Schools in Moka include Le Bocage International School, Mahatma Gandhi Institute, Mahatma Gandhi Secondary School, St Mary RCA School, and Ecole du Centre.

University University of Mauritius
Charles Telfair Institute

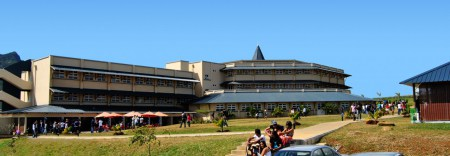
the Charles Telfair Institute, located in the village

=== Other ===
Other important institutions in Moka are the:

- Agricultural Marketing Board (AMB) which stocks vegetables (mainly potatoes) for local consumption
- Subramaniam Bharati Eye Centre (AKA Moka Eye Hospital) which is the country's only specialized eye hospital.
- Catholic Church

== Notable people ==
- Jean Louis Brue du Garoutier, French soldier later retrieving the rank of Maréchal de Camp (Brigade General) under Napoleon and serving as commander of the 2nd Brigade, 4th Infantry Division during the Waterloo Campaign.
- Thomas Shadrach James (Peersahib), teacher, linguist and herbalist in Australia
- Fabrice Lapierre, Mauritian-born Australian long jumper
- Reza Shah, exiled penultimate Shah of Iran who lived in Chateau Val Ory for 7 months after he was deposed during the 1941 Anglo-Soviet invasion of Iran.
- Capt Joshua Slocum. It was in Moka, in September 1897, that Capt Joshua Slocum visited the then existing Moka Flower conservatory during his legendary solo sailing trip around the world. During that visit, he was honored to have a plant named after him, which is today known as the Joshua Slocum day-lily and is commercially available.

== See also ==
- List of places in Mauritius
