= List of newspapers in Mauritius =

This is a list of local newspapers in Mauritius in alphabetical order.

== Mauritius ==
=== Local newspapers ===
Newspaper	Language	Frequency	Publisher/ parent company	Official website
4minit Daily News	English	Daily		www.4minit.com
5 Plus Dimanche	French	Weekly	La Sentinelle	www.5plus.mu
Addaawa	English, French	Quarterly		
Advance	French	Online	Adpress Ltd	www.advance.mu
Al-Muslimoon	French			
Allo Maurice Ki News	English, French			
Aryodaye	English, Hindi	Monthly		
Bollywood Massala	French, Hindi	Weekly	Le Défi Media Group	
BuzzFeeds Mauritius	French	Online	BuzzFeeds Mauritius	www.buzzfeedsmu.info
Investor's Mag	English	Weekly		www.investorsmag.media
Chinese Daily News	Chinese	Daily		
Le Citoyen	French	Weekly		
Le Croissant	French	Monthly		
inside news	French	Daily		www.inside.news
Indradhanush	Hindi	Quarterly		
Darpan	English, Hindi	Monthly		
La Vie Catholique	English, French	Weekly		
Le Défi Immobilier	French	Weekly	Le Défi Media Group	
Le Défi Moteurs	French	Weekly	Le Défi Media Group	
Le Défi Plus	French	Weekly	Le Défi Media Group	www.defimedia.info/defi-plus.html
Le Défi Quotidien	French	Daily	Le Défi Media Group	www.defimedia.info/defi-quotidien.html
Le Défi Sexo	French	Weekly	Le Défi Media Group	
Le Défi Turf	French	Weekly	Le Défi Media Group	www.defimedia.info/sport/
TOI	English, Hindi	Monthly		
L'Eco Austral	French	Monthly		www.ecoaustral.com
L'Express	French	Daily	La Sentinelle	www.lexpress.mu
L'Express Junior	French	Weekly	La Sentinelle	www.lexpress.mu
L'Express Dimanche	French	Weekly	La Sentinelle	www.lexpress.mu
L'Express du Samedi	French	Weekly	La Sentinelle	www.lexpress.mu
L'Express Footips	French	Weekly	La Sentinelle	www.lexpress.mu
La Gazette des Consommateurs	English, French			
Gazette des Iles	English, French	Irregular		
Hua Sheng Bao	Hindi, English	Daily		
Le Journal du Samedi	English, French			
Lagazet Lalit de Klas	English, French, Creole			
Lavoix Kreol	English, French			
Lékip	French	Weekly	La Sentinelle	www.lekip.mu
Liberté Plus	English, French	Monthly		
Lifestyle	English, French	Monthly		
La Lumière	English, French, Tamil			
Le Matinal	French	Weekly		www.lematinal.com
Le Mauricien	French	Daily	Le Mauricien Ltd	www.lemauricien.com
Mazavaroo	French	Weekly	Media Temple Ltd	www.mazavaroo.mu
Mauritius Times	English, French	Weekly		www.mauritiustimes.com
Le Mensuel de l'homme Mauricien	English, French			
Le Message	English, French			
Mirror	Chinese	Weekly		
NewsMoris	English	Daily	NewsMoris	https://newsmoris.com
Opinion Express	English	Fortnightly		
Panorama	English, French	Monthly		
People	French	Monthly		
Renaissance	French	Monthly		
Revi Lalit	Creole	Every two months	Lalit	www.lalitmauritius.org
Sada-é-Urdu	English, Urdu	Monthly		
Samedi Plus	French	Weekly		
Science & Education News Review	English, French	Weekly		
Le Socialiste	English, French	Daily		
Soleil Maurice	French	Irregular		
Star	French	Weekly		www.starpress.info
Suman	Hindi			
Sunday Times	English	Weekly		
Tejamu News	Telugu	Monthly		
Vannakam	Tamil	Monthly		
Week End	English, French	Weekly	Le Mauricien Ltd	www.lemauricien.com/topics/Week-End
Weekly	English	Weekly	La Sentinelle	

=== Defunct ===
These newspapers are no longer published.

Newspaper	Language	Frequency	Official website
24 Heures Info	English	Daily	
Action (1923-1931)	English & French	Daily	
Arya Vir and Jagriti	Hindi and English	Weekly	
Janvanee (Voice of People)	Hindi	Weekly	
La Balance	French	Weekly	
Le Cable	French	Weekly	
Le Cernéen (1832-1982)	English, French	Daily	
Le Combat	French	Weekly	
Commercial Gazette	English	Weekly	
La Croix	French	Daily	
La Dépêche	French	Daily	
Freelance	English	Weekly	
La Gazette de Maurice	French	Weekly	
Le Journal de Maurice	French	Daily	
Hindustani	Hindi	Weekly	
The Hindhustani (1909 by Manilall Doctor)	Gujarati	Weekly	
Hua Sheng Bao	Chinese	Weekly	
Impact News	English	Weekly	
Janata (1970s by Sir Seewoosagur Ramgoolam)	Hindi	Weekly	
L'Oeuvre	English, French	Daily	
Mauritius News	English	Weekly	www.mauritius-news.co.uk
Le Militant	French	Weekly	www.lemilitant.com
The Nation (1970s by Satcam Boolell)	English	Weekly	
La Patrie	French	Daily	
Le Petit Journal	French	Daily	
Le Peuple Mauricien (1930-1941 Dr. Maurice Curé)	French	Weekly	
Le Progrès Colonial	French	Weekly	
Le Radical	French	Daily	
Le Rassembleur (1980s and 1990s Hervé Duval)	French	Daily	Parti Mauricien Social Démocrate (PMSD)
Soley Ruz	Creole	Weekly	MMMSP
Sunday Vani	English, French, Creole, Hindi	Weekly	sundayvani.intnet.mu
Le Matinal	French	Daily	www.lematinal.com
Le Vrai Progrès Colonial	French	Daily	
The Sun	English, French	Daily	
Zamana	Hindi and English	Weekly	

=== Online news ===
Newspaper	Language	News	Official website
People's Press	French, English	Local, International	www.peoplepress.mu
Channel News	French	Local, regional	www.channelnews.mu
ION News	French, English	Local, regional	www.ionnews.mu
Inside news	French	daily	www.inside.news
Maurice-info	French	Local, regional, international	www.maurice-info.mu
Liberation	French, English	Local, international	www.liberation.mu
Business Mega	English	Local, international	business.mega.mu
L'Eco Austral	French	Local, regional	www.ecoaustral.com
Government of Mauritius	English, French	Local	http://www.govmu.org/english/news/Pages/default.aspx
Island Crisis	English	Local, international	www.islandcrisis.net
Kotzot	English	Local	www.kotzot.com
Kozelidir	English	Local, international	www.kozelidir.blogspot.com
MFA	French, English	Local	www.mfa.mu
Mauritius Times	French, English	Local, international	www.mauritiustimes.com
Mauritius Update	English	Local, regional	www.mauritiusupdate.com
MBC	French	Local, regional, international	www.mbcradio.tv
Mo Pays	English	Local, international	www.mopays.com
NewsMoris	English	Local, regional, international	https://newsmoris.com
Orange Mauritius	French	Local, regional	www.orange.mu
Scoop MU	French	Local	www.scoop.mu
UOM News	English, French		uomnews.wordpress.com
Lexpress Property Magazine	English, French	Local, regional, international	www.lexpressproperty.com

== Rodrigues Island ==
Newspaper	Language	Frequency	Publisher/ parent company	Official website
L'express Rodrigues	French	Weekly	La Sentinelle	https://web.archive.org/web/20150627160633/http://www.lexpress.mu/section/rodrigues
Le Plus	English, French	Weekly		
Le Rodriguais Autonome	English, French			
Ici Rodrigues	English, French			
La Tribune Rodrigues	English, French	Weekly		
La voix du Peuple	French	Weekly		
Le Vrai Rodriguais	French	Weekly		

== See also ==
- Media of Mauritius
- Lists of newspapers
- List of magazines in Mauritius
- List of radio stations in Mauritius
- Newspaper circulation
- List of newspapers in the world by circulation

== Bibliography ==
- "List of newspapers". Blue Book for the Colony of Mauritius: 1907. Port Louis. 1908. hdl:2027/nyp.33433014767390. OCLC 18922692 – via HathiTrust.
- "Mauritius: Directory: the Press". Africa South of the Sahara 2004. Regional Surveys of the World. Europa Publications. 2004. ISBN 1857431839.
