= Ranini Cundasawmy =

Cundasawmy Ranini
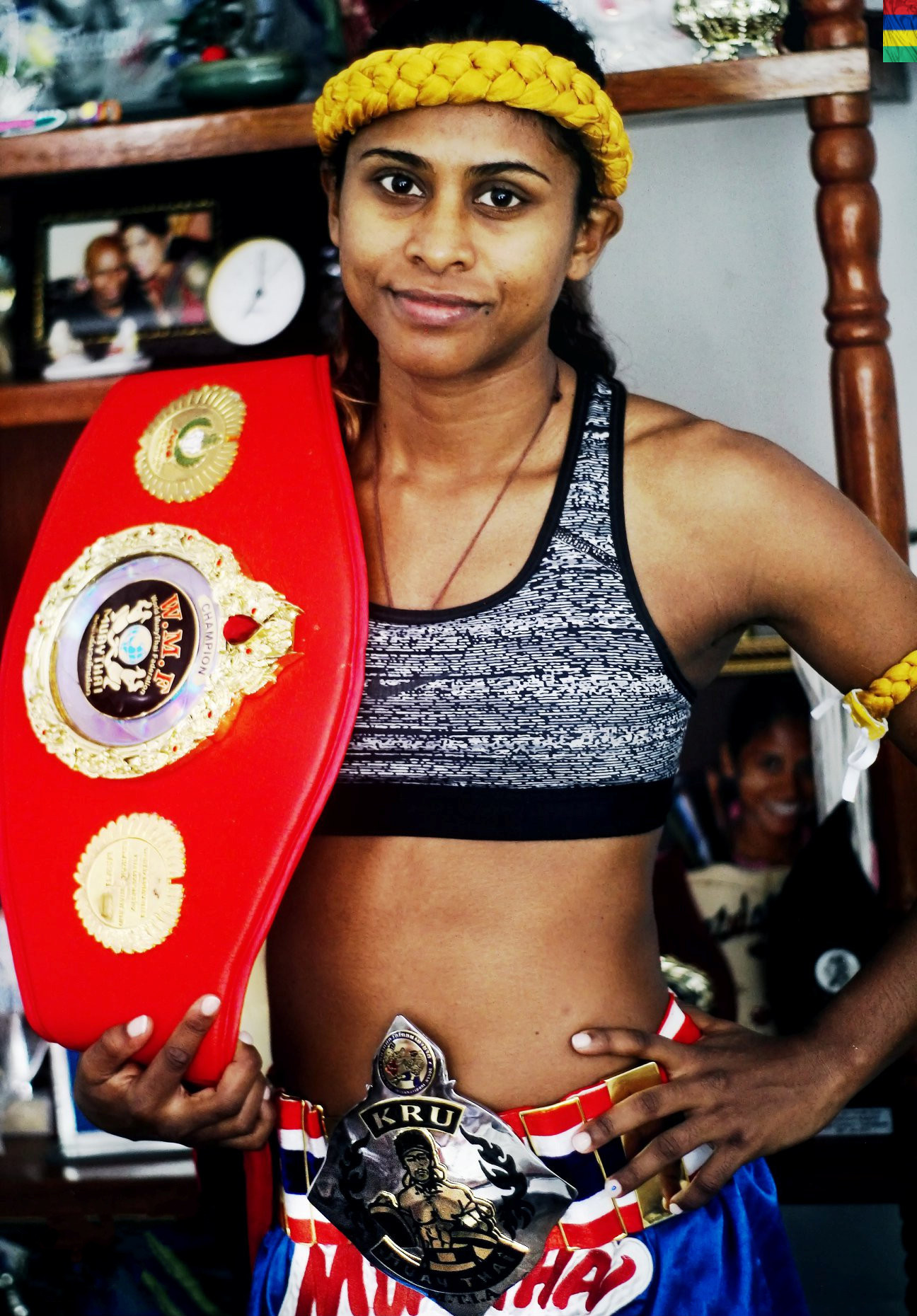
- Ranini Cundasawmy, Mauritian fighter
- Born: 19 May 1984 (age 42); Victoria Hospital, Mauritius
- Nationality: Mauritian
- Height: 155.5 cm (5 ft 1 in)
- Weight: 45–48 kg (99–106 lb)
- Division: Atomweight
- Style: Kun Khmer Pradal Serey Muay Thai Savate Taekwondo
- Team: Bambous Martial Arts
- Trainer: Cundasawmy Louis Patrick
- Years active: 2006–present

Other information
- University: St. Bartholomew's College

Ranini Cundasawmy (born 19 May 1984) is a Mauritian Muay Thai, Savate and Kun Khmer (Pradal Serey) fighter. She has won several national and world championships from the World Muay Thai Federation.

== Early life ==
Cundasawmy was born on 19 May 1984 at Victoria Hospital in Mauritius Island. From 1984 to 1994 she lived at Pope Henessy Beau Bassin, with three brothers and two sisters, Rajen, Rajesh, Jean Francois, Rajini and Annais. Her father, Mario, and her mother is Munusami.

She attended the Pre-Primary and Primary School of Maingard in Beau Bassin, then the secondary school of Villes Soeurs in Beau Bassin. At the age of 16, she left Villes Soeurs Secondary School to continue her studies at St Bartholomew's in Port-Louis.

After completing the Higher School Certificate (HSC), she wanted to continue her studies at the University of Mauritius. Unfortunately, her family could not afford the cost, so she was unable to continue her education.

Following her studies, she began practicing kickboxing to keep fit and as a pharmacy helper for one year

In 2002, she changed professions and started working as a chat animator at Toolink Crm Ltd, where she met the man who would become her coach and husband, Cundasawmy Louis Patrick. They became good friends, and he started training Ranini. She got married in 2007. Patrick Cundasawmy is now her coach and husband. In 2007, they both quit their jobs at Toolink Crm and started their own business known as DJP Productions.

In 2002, Patrick Cundasawmy took over the Combat Sport School in Bambous, and in 2011, they changed the name of the school to Bambous Martial Arts Sports Club. They provide pre-training sessions for everyone as a way to serve the community and help people get into sports for free. Training at Bambous Martial Arts is free for everyone, with three branches in Mauritius: Bambous, Flic en Flac, and Bel Ombre.

In 2011, Ranini also established the BMA Female and Kids Team training sessions, focusing specifically on women and children.

== Sports career ==
From 2005 to 2020, she competed in various Martial Arts styles, including Boxe Francaise Savate, Kyokushin, Ju Jitsu, La Croche, Croche Bataille, Taekwondo, Muay Thai and Kun Khmer. During this period, she achieved success by winning several National Championships and becoming a multiple-time World Champion in her category. Ranini is also a certified Muay Thai Instructor (KRU), accredited by the MTIA (Muay Thai International Association) and Master Toddy Muay Thai Academy, recognized by the Thai Ministry of Education.

She is also teaches Muay Thai and Kun Khmer (Pradal Serey) on a social purpose at BMA Bambous Martial Arts in her village Bambous. BMA Provide free training sessions open to everyone

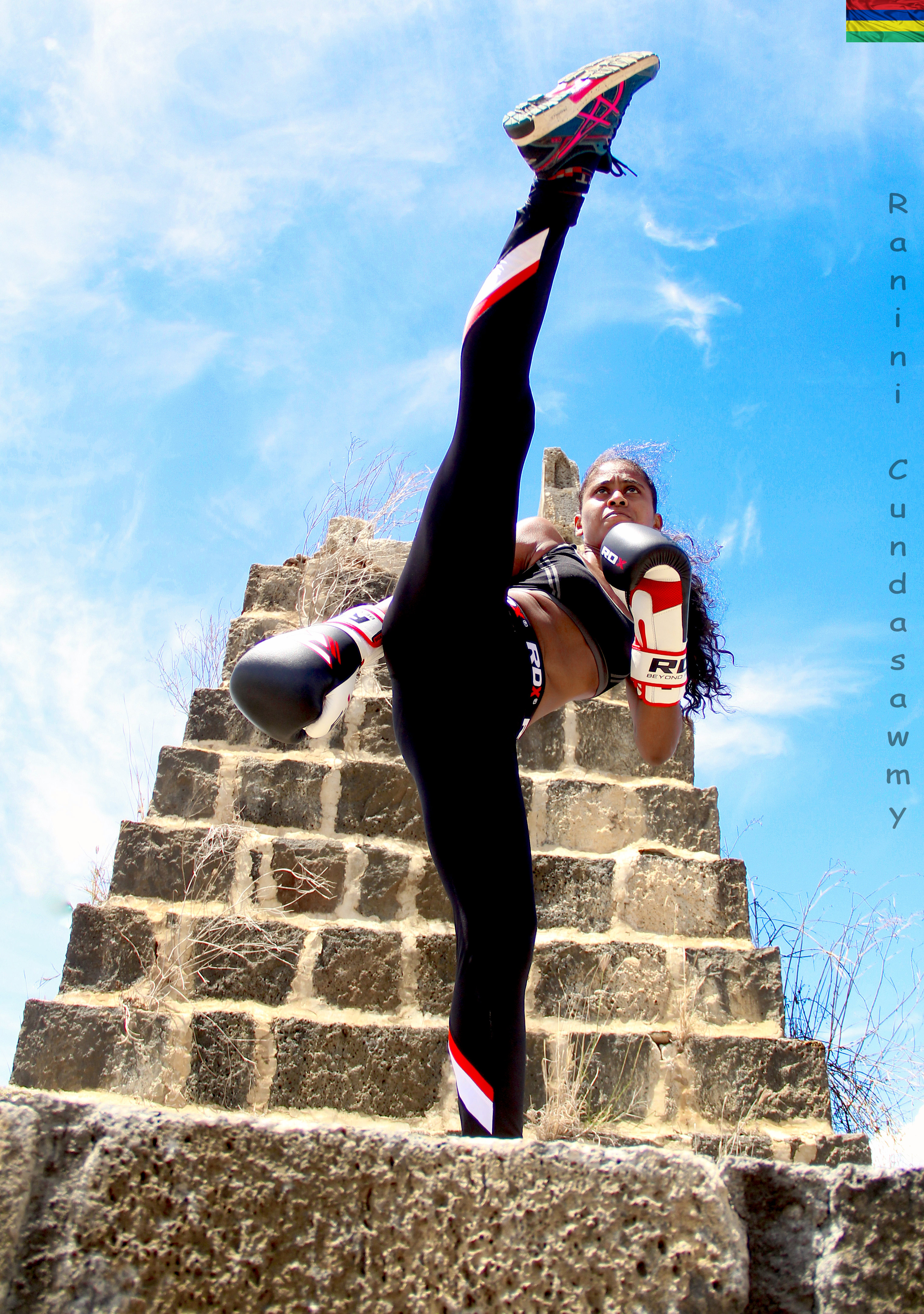

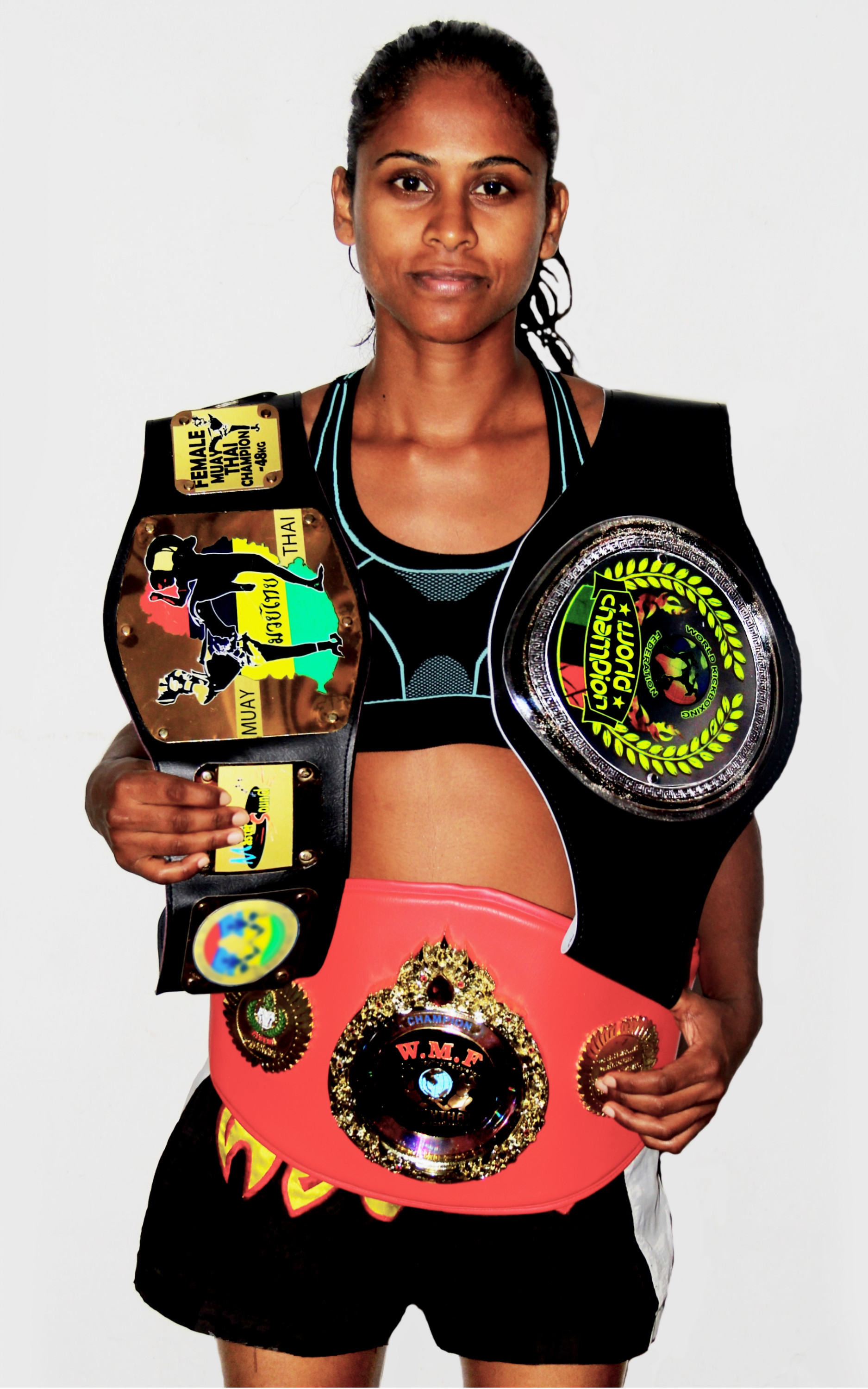

== Fight records 2005-2019 ==
- Muay Thai (23 Fights. 19 win, 4 lost, 0 draw)
- Boxe Française Savate (11 Fights. 8 Win, 3 Lost, 0 draw)
- La croche Local and International Lutte Traditionnelle de la Réunion (11 fights - 10 won, 1 lost, 0 draw)
- Kyokushin Local Fight (4 fights - 4 win, 0 lost, 0 draw)
- Taekwondo Local Fight (4 Fights. 4 win, 0 lost, 0 draw)
- Ju-Jitsu Fighting (2 fights 1 win | 1 Lost | 0 Draw

Total fights: 55 | Wins: 46 | Lost: 9 | Draw :0 | Wins by KO: 7 |

== Awards and Palmares ==
- 2006 - Boxe Française Jeux de l'ouest Champion
- 2011 - Mauritius National Muay Thai Champion
- 2012 - Mauritius National Muay Thai Champion)
- 2013 - Won the Mauritius Muay Thai Female Championship Belt
- 2013 - Mauritius National Muay Thai Champion
- 2014 - Indian Ocean Croche Champion
- 2014 - World Championship Boxe Francaise Savate Assault (Bronze Medal)
- 2014 - Mauritius National Muay Thai Champion
- 2015 - Jeux des Iles 2015 La Croche (silver medal) - 59k
- 2015 - Jeux des Iles 2015 Croche Bataille (gold medal) - 50k (synthèse de croche préhension et de moraingy percussion)
- 2015 - Mauritius National Muay Thai Champion
- 2016 - Championnat Maurice de Croche - Champion
- 2016 - Championnat Maurice de Croche Bataille - Champion
- 2016 - Kyokushinkai National Tournament 2016 - Champion
- 2016 - WKF Muay Thai World Championship (Silver Medal - VICE WORLD CHAMPION 54 kg)
- 2016 - WKF Muay Thai World Championship (World Champion -50 kg)
- 2017 - WMF Muay Thai World Champion 2017 (WORLD CHAMPION Proam -46 kg)
- 2018 - WMF Muay Thai World Champion 2018 (Gold Medal | WORLD CHAMPION am -48 kg)
- 2019 - KIF Kun Khmer World Championship 2019 (Silver Medal | 46 kg)
- 2019 - WMF Muay Thai World Championship (Gold Medal | WORLD CHAMPION am-48 kg)
- 2023 - (JCI) JCI Mauritius The Outstanding Young Person (TOYP) Award Winner
- 2023 - Kun Khmer World Champion (Gold Medal Championship Belt 45 kg) Category KIF
- 2024 - Kun Khmer World Champion (Gold Medal Championship Belt 45 kg) Category KIF

== Citations ==
- Jameela Jaddoo (10 May 2013), "Ranini Cundasawmy – The Muay Thai Champion", News on Sunday, Le Défi Media Group, p. 14, archived from the original on 17 April 2018
- Jameela Jaddoo (10 May 2013), "Ranini Cundasawmy – The Muay Thai Champion", News on Sunday, Le Défi Media Group, p. 15, archived from the original on 14 July 2019
- "Le punch du muay thai", Essentielle (in French), La Sentinelle (Mauritius), p. 95, Jul 2012, archived from the original on 2019-07-14
- Premita Leelachand (March 2013), "Le combat chelillé au corps", Le Dimanche L'hebdo, Le Défi Media Group, p. 3, archived from the original on 2019-07-14
- Ruqayah Khayarttee (10 Nov 2012), "Ranini Cundasawmy Sportive Dans le Sang", This Week (in French), p. 6, archived from the original on 14 July 2019
- Patrick Hilbert (Dec 2012), "Poings D'aciers dans un gant de velour", Le Defi Life Magazine, Le Défi Media Group, p. 70, archived from the original on 2019-07-14
- Patrick Hilbert (Dec 2012), "Poings D'aciers dans un gant de velour", Le Defi Life Magazine, Le Défi Media Group, p. 71, archived from the original on 2019-07-14
- "CHAMPIONNATS NATIONAUX DE CROCHE", Le Mauricien (in French), 16 May 2013
- "Muay Thaï Mondiaux Début des hostilités ce mercredi", Le Defi (in French), Le Défi Media Group, 5 Sep 2012, archived from the original on 14 July 2019
- Anoop Dhookeeya (22 July 2013), "Le sport dans le sang", Espace Jeunes (in French), Espace Jeune, archived from the original on 14 July 2019
- Naushad Korimdun (7 Oct 2013), "Female Muay Thai Championship Belt", Le defi quotidien (in French), Le Défi Media Group, archived from the original on 26 April 2014
- "Championat de Croche de l'ocean indien", Le quotidien Ile de la reunion (in French), Le Quotidien de La Réunion, 22 May 2014, archived from the original on 14 July 2014
- "Mauritius National Champion 2015", 5 Plus Dimanche (in French), 5plus.mu, 20 Dec 2015, archived from the original on 4 March 2016
