= Yanish Engutsamy =

Mauritian radio personality

Rj Yaniish Engutsamy
- Born: Yaniish Engutsamy; Mauritius
- Education: Curtin University UCLan Mauritius
- Occupations: Radio Jockey, Presenter
- Years active: 2013–present

Yaniish Engutsamy, popularly known as RJ Yaniish, is a Mauritian radio jockey, presenter based in Mauritius. He is best known as the host of Radio Plus show Allô-Maurice & Cocktail Junction. He now hosts the Evening News at 7 PM on Radio Plus, and the 7-10 PM slot, the You & i Show from Monday to Thursday.

== Radio career ==
Year	Radio Station	Job Title	Weekdays	Weekends
2017 to present	Radio Plus	Radio Jockey & English Newscaster	Fusion Café (1-3 PM)	Morning Bliss (4-6AM)
2013 to 2017	Top FM (Mauritius)	Radio Jockey & Newscaster	Breakfast Show (6 - 9 AM)	Saturday Mix (7 - 10 PM)

== TikTok Awards Night Mauritius ==
First launched by Radio Plus (Mauritius), Yaniish has also been a presenter for the TikTok Awards Night (Mauritius), which was held in Mauritius at the Caudan Arts Centre in Port Louis on 23 December 2019.
