= List of magazines in Mauritius =

This is a list of magazines from Mauritius.

Magazine	Language	Frequency	Publisher/parent company	Official website
Automoto	French	Monthly	La Sentinelle	
Business Magazine	French	Weekly	La Sentinelle	
La Case	French, English	Monthly	La Sentinelle	lacase.mu
Ciné Star Magazine	English, French	Fortnightly		
COCO Magazine	French, English	Monthly	COCO Maurice	
Le Défi Life	French	Triannual	Le Défi Media Group	www.defimedia.info/ledefilife.html
Le Défi Turf	French	Weekly	Le Défi Media Group	Sport.defimedia
Énergie	French	Monthly	La Sentinelle	
Essentielle	English, French	Monthly	La Sentinelle	www.essentielle.mu
Homes Magazine	English, French	Bimonthly	Smart Media Ltd	HOMES.MU
Investor's Mag	English, French	Quarterly	Vinker Editors	Mag
Kozé	French	Bimonthly	Évolution Pre Presse	KOZE.MU
LaCase	French	Bimonthly	Mediatiz Ltd	www.lacase.mu
LexpressProperty	French, English	Bimonthly	Mediatiz Ltd	www.lexpressproperty.com
L'express Turf	English	Weekly	La Sentinelle	L'express Turf
Islandinfo	English	Monthly		Islandinfo.mu
Lifestyle	English	Weekly		
Longitude 57°	French, English	Monthly		www.longitude57.com
Luxury Mauritius	French, English	Biannual	Mediatiz Ltd	www.luxury-in-mauritius.com
Mets Plaisirs	French	Weekly	La Sentinelle	
Motormag	English, French	Monthly	Dubourg Editions Ltd	Motormag.mu
Next Step	French	Quarterly	Évolution Pre Presse	
Panorama	French	Monthly	La Sentinelle	
Scope Magazine	English, French	Weekly	Le Mauricien Ltd	SCOPE Magazine
Sundays	English, French	Quarterly	Évolution Pre Presse	SUNDAYS.MU
TechKnow	French	Triannual	Le Mauricien Ltd	
Turf Magazine	English	Weekly	Le Mauricien Ltd	Turfmag
Indradhanush	English, French, Hindi	Quarterly	Indradhanush Sanskritic Parishad	

== See also ==
- Media of Mauritius
- Lists of magazines
- List of newspapers in Mauritius
- List of radio stations in Mauritius
