= COVID-19 pandemic in Réunion =

Ongoing COVID-19 viral pandemic in Réunion, France

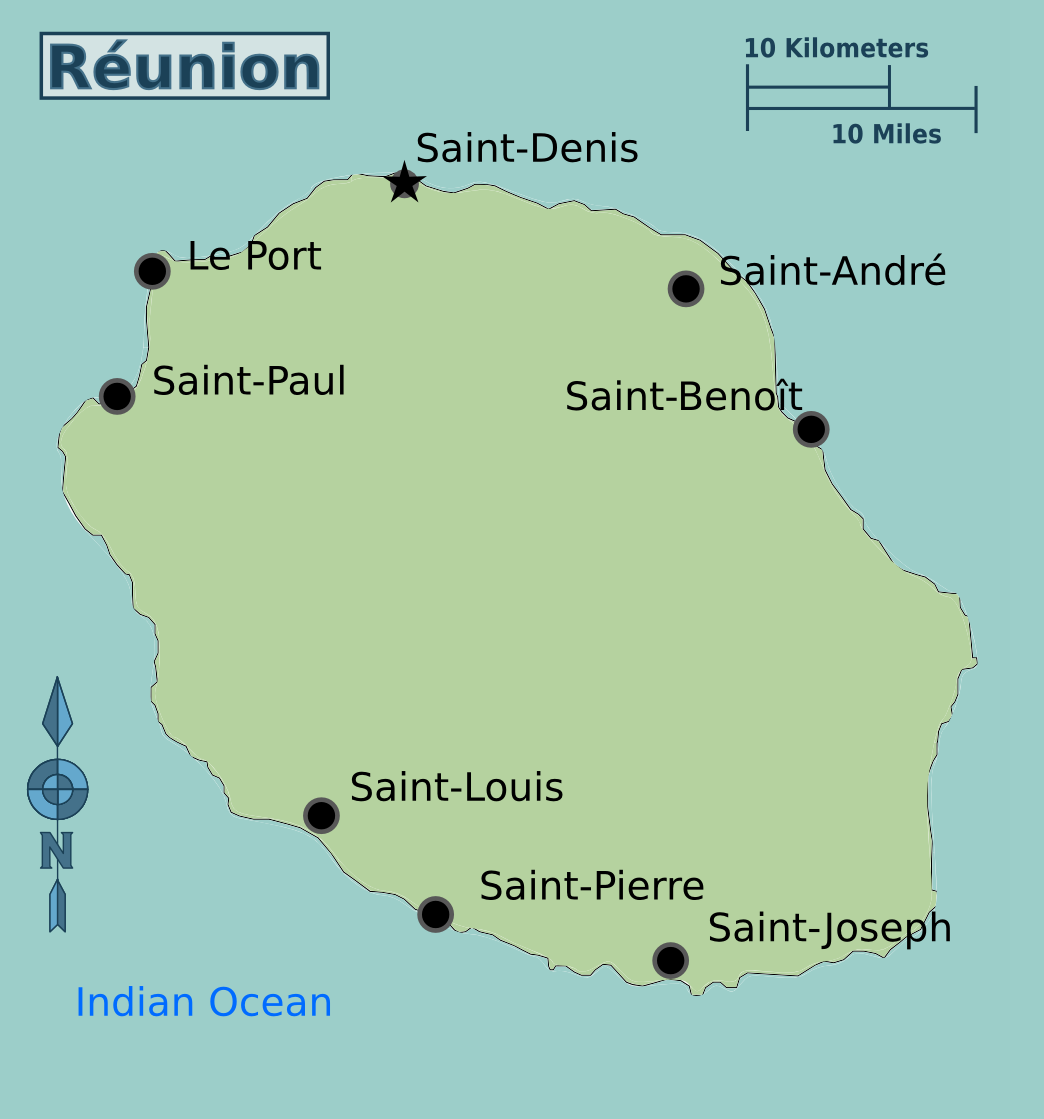
- Disease: COVID-19
- Pathogen: SARS-CoV-2
- Location: Réunion
- First outbreak: Wuhan, Hubei, China
- Arrival date: 11 March 2020 (6 years, 5 months, 3 weeks and 6 days)
- Confirmed cases: 494,595
- Recovered: 493,674
- Deaths: 921

Government website
- reunion.gouv.fr

The COVID-19 pandemic in Reunión was a part of the pandemic of the Coronavirus disease 2019 (COVID-19) that was caused by the Severe acute respiratory syndrome coronavirus 2 (SARS CoV-2) and which was confirmed to have reached the French overseas department and region of Réunion on 11 March 2020. On 20 May 2020, the first death was announced.

== Background ==
On 12 January 2020, the World Health Organization (WHO) confirmed that a novel coronavirus was the cause of a respiratory illness in a cluster of people in Wuhan City, Hubei Province, China, which was reported to the WHO on 31 December 2019.

The case fatality ratio for COVID-19 has been much lower than SARS of 2003, but the transmission has been significantly greater, with a significant total death toll.

Réunion is an overseas department and region of the French Republic and the State is represented by a Prefect. One of the tasks of the Prefect is to manage major crises. The current Prefect for Réunion is Jacques Billant.

== Timeline ==
=== March 2020 ===
- On 11 March, the department's first case of COVID-19 was confirmed.
- On 14 March, the number of confirmed cases rose to 6.
- On 15 March, the confirmed cases rose to seven.
- On 18 March, the number of confirmed cases rose to 14.
- On 19 March, the number of cases doubled to cumulative 28.
- On 21 March, the number of cases rose to 47.
- On 22 March, the number of cases rose to 64. The city of Saint-Denis announced the closure of the markets from 25 March onwards.
- On 30 March, the number of cases rose to 224.
- On 31 March at 15:00, the 247th case was confirmed. 23 additional cases declared in 24 hours. 246 of the cases were active.

=== April 2020 ===
- On 1 April, the 281st case was confirmed. The ARS reports 195 imported cases, 45 cases of local transmission and 1 indigenous case. The healing of 40 patients was announced on the same day.
- On 2 April, the 308th case was confirmed. The ARS announced that it investigated 267 cases, with 41 still to be found and screened.
- On 3 April, The 321st case was confirmed. Imported cases were still in the majority, with a minimum of 195 cases. 51 people were hospitalized, including 2 in intensive care. 33 healthcare workers contracted the disease, including 28 infected outside the country.
- On 4 April, the 334th case was confirmed. 35 cases tested positive, 2 more than the previous day and the cases in intensive care went from 2 to 4. Contact subjects were assessed at the number of 2000.
- On 5 April, the 344th case was confirmed. 313 cases were investigated by the ARS. The affected population was made up of: 10% of minors, 47% of people aged 18 to 50, 29% of 51 to 65, and 14% of people over 65.
- On 6 April, the 349th case was confirmed. Despite the relative flattening of the curve of detected patients, 9 travelers assigned to confinement violated the prefectural decree by leaving their hotel quarantine.
- On 7 April, the 358th case was confirmed, confirming a momentary drop in new cases detected daily. The former hospital Gabriel Martin in Saint-Paul reopened a shelter for the homeless. Robert Chaudenson, researcher of Réunion Creole who created the first lexicon of the language, died in Lyon at the age of 82 of COVID-19.
- On 9 April, the 376th case was confirmed. The assessment of indigenous cases brought the number to 25. The number of people recovered was estimated at 199.
- On 10 April, the 382nd case was confirmed. 3 cases were detected positive for the coronavirus at the accommodation facility for dependent elderly (EHPAD), presenting asymptomatic symptoms of COVID-19.
- On 11 April, the 388th case was confirmed. There were no new cases to report in EHPAD. The second week of April marked a drop in the number of cases, also causing an easing in compliance with confinement rules.
- On 14 April, a dedicated medical center opened in La Possession.
- On 17 April, a homeless person imprisoned in Domenjod prison tested positive for COVID-19. As of 23 April, all people who had been in contact with him have tested negative. The patient who was asymptomatic, was returned on 27 April and isolated in a special wing.
- On 24 April, L'Association Culturelle des Jeunes du Tampon (ACJT) started to distribute food parcels during Ramadan to aid the underprivileged under confinement. 67 French people including 3 infants stranded in Madagascar and Réunion were repatriated.
- As of 25 April, no COVID-19 deaths had been reported, however Réunion was on the grip of two epidemics, as there was a fourth death from dengue which had been announced. There had been more than 4,200 dengue infections up to date.
- On 30 April, Daniel Gonthier, the mayor of Bras-Panon, announced that the schools in his city will not reopen on 18 May. Réunion is now listed as green; there are currently 5 people in hospital and 1 in intensive care. Masks will have a maximum price of €0.95. During the month there were 173 new cases, bringing the total number of confirmed cases to 420. The number of recovered patients increased to 300, leaving 120 active cases at the end of the month (51% fewer than at the end of March).

=== May 2020 ===
- On 3 May, André Thien Ah Koon, mayor of Le Tampon, would not reopen the schools on 18 May. Even though ARS Réunion reassured Koon that the municipality was officially virus free, he considered protecting children fundamental.
- On 5 May, the French government announced a €200,- grant to all students under 25 stranded in France. The Union of Reunion Students of France expressed disappointment as being insufficient move.
- On 11 May, the Great Mosque of Saint-Denis asked people to keep their patience. The full reopening of religious ceremonies was set for 29 May, however some preferred 24 or 25 May in order to celebrate Eid. Iqbal Ingar, the President of the mosque, considered the safety of the believer an absolute priority. Places of worship reopened on the 11 May, but were limited to 10 people inside.
- On 20 May, the first death due to COVID-19 was announced. It concerned an 82-year-old man who was diagnosed in Mayotte, and was transferred to Réunion on 9 May.
- In May, there were 51 new cases, bringing the total number of confirmed cases to 471. One patient died and 111 patients recovered, raising the total number of recovered patients to 411. There were 59 active cases at the end of the month, less than half the number of active cases the previous month.

=== June 2020 ===
- On 24 June, a 19-year-old man, who had been evacuated from Mayotte the day before, died of the disease.
- During June, there were 55 new cases, bringing the total number of confirmed cases to 526. The death toll doubled to two and the number of recovered patients increased by 61 to 472. There were 52 active cases at the end of the month: 12% less than at the end of May.

=== July to September 2020 ===
- There were 134 new cases in July, bringing the total number of confirmed cases to 660. The death toll doubled to 4. The number of recovered patients increased by 120 to 592, leaving 64 active cases at the end of the month: an increase by 23% from the previous month.
- On 23 August, the Prefecture and Regional Health Agency confirmed 92 new cases of COVID-19, a new daily high. To date, there were 1209 cases, nine active clusters, and nine patients in the ICU. The agency also with ARS, reported that out of 1091 cases which were investigated, 43% were imported cases.
- On 26 August, a total of 13 clusters were identified, nine of which are in Saint-Denis.
- There were 1019 new cases in August, raising the total number of confirmed cases to 1679. The death toll more than doubled to 9. There were 790 active cases at the end of the month.
- On 2 September, the Prefecture and Regional Health Agency confirmed 82 new cases of COVID-19, bringing the total number of confirmed cases to 1768 and a number of deaths of 5 (2 from outside). During the month there were 2314 new cases, raising the total number of confirmed cases to 3993. The death toll rose to 16.

=== October to December 2020 ===
- There were 1666 new cases in October, bringing the total number of confirmed cases to 5659. The death toll rose to 24.
- There were 2395 new cases in November, raising the total number of confirmed cases to 8054. The death toll rose to 40.
- There were 983 new cases in December, taking the total number of confirmed cases to 9037. The death toll rose to 42.

=== January to March 2021 ===
- The 501.V2 variant was confirmed in Réunion on 16 January.
- There were 1157 new cases in January, taking the total number of confirmed cases to 10194. The death toll rose to 46.
- There were 2931 new cases in February, taking the total number of confirmed cases to 13125. The death toll rose to 59.
- There were 3461 new cases in March, taking the total number of confirmed cases to 16586. The death toll rose to 115.

=== April to June 2021 ===
- There were 4865 new cases in April, taking the total number of confirmed cases to 21451. The death toll rose to 150.
- There were 4624 new cases in May, taking the total number of confirmed cases to 26075. The death toll rose to 203. By 30 May, 165563 persons had received their first inoculation and 78838 persons had received both.
- There were 5770 new cases in June, taking the total number of confirmed cases to 31845. The death toll rose to 244. By 26 June, 233018 persons had received their first inoculation and 163826 persons were fully vaccinated.

=== July to September 2021 ===
- There were 8400 new cases in July, taking the total number of confirmed cases to 40245. The death toll rose to 288. By 30 July, 335794 persons had received their first inoculation and 244753 persons had received both.
- There were 10101 new cases in August, raising the total number of confirmed cases to 50346. The death toll rose to 342. By 30 August, 446,119 persons had received one inoculation and 378,394 had received both.
- There were 3336 new cases in September, raising the total number of confirmed cases to 53682. The death toll rose to 366. By the end of September, 452,332 persons had been fully vaccinated.

=== October to December 2021 ===
- There were 1443 new cases in October, bringing the total number of confirmed cases to 55125. The death toll rose to 376.
- The first confirmed case in France of the B.1.1.529 strain was identified in Réunion on 30 November. The 53-year-old man travelled from Mozambique to Réunion via O. R. Tambo International Airport and Sir Seewoosagur Ramgoolam International Airport, leaving Mozambique on 19 November and arriving in Réunion the following day. He tested negative twice on 19 November (Mozambique, Mauritius) and once upon arrival in Réunion on 20 November. A fourth test two days later proved to be positive and the man was subsequently found to carry the Omicron strain.
- There were 6063 new cases in November, raising the total number of confirmed cases to 61188. The death toll rose to 384. By the end of November, 513,730 persons had been fully vaccinated.
- A second travel-related case of the omicron strain was confirmed on 3 December.
- There were 15414 new cases in December, raising the total number of confirmed cases to 76602. The death toll rose to 409. By the end of December, 533,382 persons had been fully vaccinated.

=== 2022 ===
- There were 149403 new cases in January, raising the total number of confirmed cases to 226005. The death toll rose to 531. By the end of January, 546,486 persons had been fully vaccinated.
- There were 76157 new cases in February, raising the total number of confirmed cases to 302162. The death toll rose to 666. By the end of February, 557,033 persons had been fully vaccinated.
- There were 45779 new cases in March, raising the total number of confirmed cases to 347941. The death toll rose to 720. By the end of March, 561,169 persons had been fully vaccinated.

=== April to June 2022 ===
- There were 50174 new cases in April, raising the total number of confirmed cases to 398115. The death toll rose to 756. By the end of April, 562,283 persons had been fully vaccinated.
- There were 18546 new cases in May, raising the total number of confirmed cases to 416661. The death toll rose to 784. By the end of May, 564,150 persons had been fully vaccinated.
- There were 6108 new cases in June, raising the total number of confirmed cases to 422769. The death toll rose to 819. By the end of June, 575,196 persons had been fully vaccinated.

=== July to September 2022 ===
- There were 17978 new cases in July, raising the total number of confirmed cases to 440747. The death toll rose to 845.
- There were 22408 new cases in August, raising the total number of confirmed cases to 463155. The death toll rose to 874.
- There were 9181 new cases in September, raising the total number of confirmed cases to 472336. The death toll rose to 894.

=== October to December 2022 ===
- There were 1775 new cases in October, raising the total number of confirmed cases to 474111. The death toll rose to 899.
- There were 3194 new cases in November, raising the total number of confirmed cases to 477305. The death toll rose to 903.
- There were 13307 new cases in December, raising the total number of confirmed cases to 490612. The death toll rose to 913.

=== 2023 ===
- There were 3983 new cases in 2023, raising the total number of confirmed cases to 494595. The death toll rose to 921.

== Preventive measures ==
All measures decreed by President Emmanuel Macron in March have been applied locally by the Prefect Jacques Billant.

- Airport and ports are closed.
- All restaurants and bars are closed, and all gatherings are banned.
- All schools are closed. From 18 May onwards, schools will reopen, however 13 mayors have stated that the closure will remain in effect.
- It is prohibited to leave the house except for essential journeys.
- From 1 April onwards, the sale of alcoholic beverages has been prohibited after 17:00.
- From 10 April onwards, all shops including supermarkets have to close at 19:00.
- On 11 May, deconfinement will start, businesses will reopen, masks are mandatory and the beaches will reopen. Restaurants and bars will not reopen. There will be a mandatory 14 day quarantine for people entering the territory.

== Statistic ==
Number of new cases per day

== See also ==
- COVID-19 pandemic in Africa
- COVID-19 pandemic by country and territory
- COVID-19 pandemic in Mayotte
