= Agalega Creole =

Mauritian Creole dialect of Agaléga

- kreol
- Native to: Mauritius
- Region: Agalega Islands
- Native speakers: <1,000
- Language family: French Creole: Bourbonnais Creoles; Mauritian Creole; Agalega Creole

Language codes
- ISO 639-3: None (mis)
- Linguist List: mfe-aga
- Glottolog: None
- IETF: mfe-u-sd-muag

Agalega Creole is a creole language influenced by French spoken in Agalega. It has been heavily influenced by both Mauritian Creole and Seychellois Creole, as well as Malagasy. The population of speakers number just under 1,000.

== See also ==
- Creole language
- Rodriguan creole
- Mauritian creole
- Chagossian creole
