= Planet FM (Mauritius) =

Private Radio Station in Mauritius

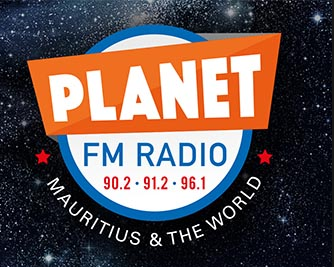
- Ebene CyberCity; Mauritius

Programming
- Languages: French, Hindi, Mauritian Creole, English

Ownership
- Owner: Mayfair and Purely Communications Ltd

History
- First air date: May 2, 2019
- Last air date: August 3, 2020
- Former frequencies: 96.1 MHz (Centre); 90.2 MHz (North and South); 91.2MHz (East and West)

Links
- Webcast: http://www.planetfm.mu/
- Website: http://www.planetfm.mu/

Planet FM was a private radio station in Mauritius. It began operation on May 2, 2019 with a Private Commercial Free to Air FM Radio Broadcasting Licence issued by the Independent Broadcasting Authority-Mauritius. On a letter dated 3 August 2020, the Independent Broadcasting Authority (Mauritius) revoked the licence of the radio for non-compliance with the Information and Communication Technologies Act 2001. It cited the station's failure to broadcast between 6 and 11 June and 13 June and 10 July. The station stated it had been relocating studios but, due to the COVID-19 pandemic, was unable to get a fiber connection to the new studio at Coromandel.

Planet Fm's slogan was "Mauritius and The World" (French: Maurice et le monde).

== See also ==
List of radio stations in Mauritius
