= Sparking Dawn =

English-language Mauritian news website

Sparking Dawn is an English language Mauritian online news website founded in January 2012. The website features both Mauritian and International news and is noticeable for its satirical reporting style.

Sparking Dawn was founded in 2012 by a partnership agreement between Tidal Waves Ltd, a limited liability company located in Mauritius and another Mauritian online news website, Island Crisis.

== See also ==
- List of newspapers in Mauritius
