= Radio Plus =

Radio Plus may refer to:

- Radio Plus (Belgium)
- Radio Plus (Coventry)
- Radio Plus (Mauritius)
- Radio Plus (Poland)
