= Best FM =

Best FM may refer to:

- Best FM (Malaysia), a private radio station in Malaysia
- Best FM (Mauritius), an entertainment radio station in Mauritius
- BEST FM 95, a radio station in India run by Asianet
- TIHBG-FM, a radio station ("Best FM", 103.5 MHz) in Costa Rica run by MVS Radio
- Best FM (Turkey), a Turkish radio station
