= Rodriguan =

Rodriguan may refer to:

- Anything of, from, or related to Rodrigues, an island which is part of Mauritius located 5608 km (3488 mi) east of Mauritius island
- A person from Rodrigues, or of Rodriguan descent. For information on Rodriguan people, see Demographics of Rodrigues and Culture of Rodrigues. For specific persons, see List of Rodriguans.
- Note that there is no language called "Rodriguan". The most widely spoken languages are English (official) and French. See also Rodriguan creole the country's native language.
