= Kalki (magazine) =

Tamil magazine published from Chennai, Tamil Nadu, India

- Frequency: Weekly
- Founded: 1941; 85 years ago
- Company: Bharathan Publications
- Country: India
- Language: Tamil
- Website: kalkionline.com

Kalki was a Tamil-language weekly magazine published from Chennai, India. The magazine was established by Kalki Krishnamurthy, a popular Tamil novelist and Indian freedom fighter, in 1941. T Sadasivam was the magazine's co-founder. The magazine is known for its publication of historic novels such as Ponniyin Selvan and Sivagamiyin Sapatham. Singer Semmangudi Srinivasa Iyer and music critic S. V. Seshadri were also involved with the magazine in its coverage of music.

Kalki Krishnamurthy also edited the magazine, which was published on a weekly basis. During his term the magazine was much more respected due to its quality. The magazine ceased publication in 1977 due to a worker's strike but restarted in June 1978. Mullum Malarum (authored by Umachandran), which won this magazine's first prize in the silver jubilee novel competition, was first published in this magazine as a serial, and later made into a successful film.

== Website ==
Kalki Online, a news website by the Kalki Group, was established in September 2021 after the print editions were discontinued due to the COVID-19 pandemic. The website hosts all the previous print issues as e-journals, and also has a YouTube channel.
