= Wazaa FM =

Private radio station in Mauritius

Ebene CyberCity; Mauritius
- Frequencies: 103.2 MHz (Centre); 100.5 MHz (North, South); 106.5 MHz (East, West)

Programming
- Languages: French, Hindi, Mauritian Creole, English
- Format: CHR

Ownership
- Owner: First Talk Ltd; (Private Commercial Free to Air FM Radio broadcasting license)

History
- First air date: 10 May 2019
- Last air date: 22 December 2025

Links
- Website: www.wazaa.mu

Wazaa FM was a privately owned radio station in Mauritius, which broadcast from May 2019 to December 2025. It broadcast under a Private Commercial Free to Air FM Radio Broadcasting Licence issued by the Independent Broadcasting Authority-Mauritius. Its format consisted of popular music, primarily Bollywood music, and talk programmes.

First Talk Ltd was chosen by the Independent Broadcasting Authority from among 17 applicants for one of two new radio station licences. It operated the pro-government online publication Inside News. The station closed on 22 December 2025 due to increasing competition and persistent financial difficulties, which it stated began during the COVID-19 pandemic.

== See also ==
- List of radio stations in Mauritius
