= Burundi Pidgin French =

French-based creole of Burundi

Burundian Creole
- Native to: Burundi
- Native speakers: None
- Language family: French-based creole: Burundian Creole

Language codes
- ISO 639-3: None (mis)
- Glottolog: buru1323

Burundian Creole is a stably pidginized form of French spoken in the African nation of Burundi. It is one of several such pidgins in francophone countries. Infinitives tend to be used for all verb forms (e.g. vous savoi for vous savez 'you know'). It is unlikely to ever creolize, as the Rundi language is spoken by the entire Burundian population.
