= TikTok Awards Night =

2019 awards event in Mauritius

- Venue: Caudan Arts Centre
- Country: Mauritius
- Hosted by: Yanish Engutsamy, Neelam Sharma, Ton Simon, Jo Coopoosamy amongst others.
- First award: 23 December 2019
- Winner(s): Kushal Awatarsing, Nitish Seedam, Mayur Rughoo, Shehzad and Shehzannah Ellaheebux, Maieza Jerome, Yash Soochit, Shehzaadi Jawdy, Julien Antonio et Gwendolyn Rene, Shanaya Balloo & Ismil Bhaukaurally

Television/radio coverage
- Produced by: Radio Plus (Mauritius)

The TikTok Awards Night ceremony was first held in Mauritius on 23 December 2019 by Radio Plus (Mauritius), at the Caudan Arts Centre in Port Louis, honoring different tiktokers in different categories and encouraging them for their effort of providing entertainment through their videos on the TikTok social app.

== TikTok Awards Night Winners 2019 ==
Categories	Winner's Name	TikTok Username	Winner's TikTok Video
Best Politician TikTok Award	Kushal Awatarsing	@kushalawatarsingofficial	I order you out - Shakeel Mohamed
Best Local TikTok Award	Shehzad and Shehzannah Ellaheebux	@Shehz_emperror	
Best Bollywood TikTok Award	Nitish Seedam	@nitishseedam	
Best Creative TikTok Award	Mayur Rughoo	@mayurrughoo1793	Memories Never Die
Best Dancing TikTok Award	Maieza Jerome	N/A	
Best Fx TikTok Award	Yash Soochit	@yash.s_official	
Best Kid TikTok Award	Shehzaadi Jawdy	N/A	
Best Duet TikTok Award	Julien Antonio et Gwendolyn Rene	N/A	
Heart Touching Award	Shanaya Balloo	N/A	
Public Choice Award	Ismil Bhaukaurally	@ismil_ixx	
