= Chris Corne =

New Zealand linguist (1942–1999)

John Christopher Corne (5 July 1942 – 17 May 1999) was a linguist from New Zealand and a specialist in Creole languages. He was educated at Whangarei Boys' High School from 1956 to 1960. Corne completed a doctoral degree at the University of Auckland in 1970, with a thesis on the pronunciation of Tahitian French.

== Publications ==
- 1970. Essai de grammaire du créole mauricien, Auckland : Linguistic Society of New Zealand.
- 1977. Seychelles Creole grammar: elements for Indian Ocean Proto-Creole reconstruction, Tübingen: Verlag Narr.
- 1982 (with Philip Baker), Isle de France Creole: Affinities and Origins, Ann Arbor: Karoma.
- 1988. "Mauritian Creole Reflexives", Journal of Pidgin and Creole Languages, Volume 3, Number 1, 1988, pp. 69–94
- 1999. From French to Creole, Battlebridge Publications (Westminster Creolistics).

== See also ==
- Mauritian Creole
