= La Sentinelle (Mauritius) =

Media company in Mauritius

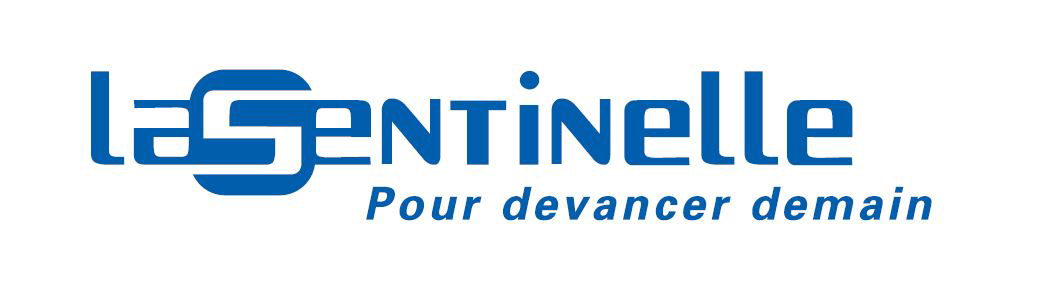
- Trade name: La Sentinelle Ltd
- Company type: Privately held company
- Industry: Media
- Founded: 1963
- Headquarters: Baie-du-Tombeau, Mauritius
- Area served: Mauritius; Madagascar; Réunion; Rodrigues
- Key people: Chairman; Philippe A. Forget; Chief Executive Officer; Areff Salauroo; Director of Publications; Nad Sivaramen
- Products: Newspapers e-Radio; Magazines; Audiovisual
- Services: Printing; Advertising; Digital; Communication; Press
- Number of employees: 635
- Subsidiaries: Business Publications Ltd, Caractère Ltée, Eye Catch Ltd, L'express de Madagascar, LSL Digital, Property Finder Ltd
- Website: www.lasentinelle.mu

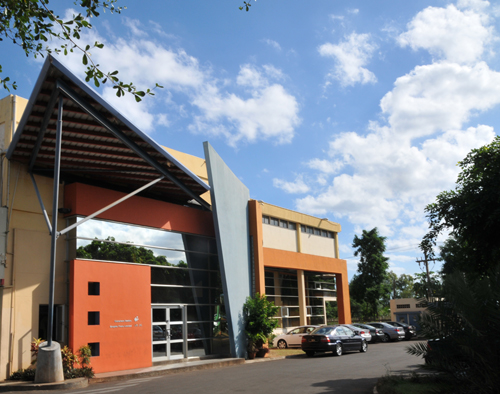
La Sentinelle Headquarters

La Sentinelle is a company based in Baie-du-Tombeau, Mauritius. The company operations include newspapers, designing, printing, advertising, publishing of specialized magazines and newsletters. The company have recently gone digital and through the "lsldigital", it proposes news in visual and audio format and have further spread its reach through its brand L'Express.

== See also ==
- List of newspapers in Mauritius
- List of magazines in Mauritius
- List of radio stations in Mauritius
