= Chagossian Creole =

French-based creole of former Chagos Islands inhabitants

- kreol Ilwa
- Native to: British Indian Ocean Territory, Mauritius, Seychelles
- Ethnicity: Chagossians
- Native speakers: (1,800 cited 1994)
- Language family: French Creole: Bourbonnais Creole; Mauritian Creole; Chagossian Creole

Language codes
- ISO 639-3: –
- Glottolog: None
- IETF: mfe-IO

Chagossian Creole, also known as Chagossian Kreol, (also créole îlois, kreol Ilwa, or just Ilwa) is a French-based creole that is spoken by Chagossians, the former inhabitants of the Chagos Archipelago in the British Indian Ocean Territory. Ilwa is a variety of Mauritian Creole with influences from Seychellois Creole. It is currently spoken mainly in Mauritius and the Seychelles. There is also a small minority community speaking the language in the United Kingdom.

== History ==
The ultimate origins of Chagossian Creole can be traced to the workforce of coconut oil plantations during the French colonial era. Control of Mauritius passed to the British in 1810 and slavery was abolished in 1835, which did little to change the plantation system of agriculture, although indentured labor from India and China began to supplement the workforce, contributing to the development of a distinct Chagossian identity (Zilois). Sega tambour Chagos is sung in Chagossian Creole and originated from these workers.

Even after the expulsion of the Chagossians, Chagossian Creole continued to be spoken as a symbol of Chagossian culture and identity. As reported by Chagossians who resettled in West Sussex, some British schools banned students from using Chagossian Creole. Chagossians living in the Seychelles often concealed their accents and attempted to blend in linguistically during periods of political tensions in that country. Use of Chagossian Creole in the Seychelles increased in the 1990s following democratic reforms.

Chagossian Creole has been used as a language of protest, as in 2024 to protest the British government planning to hand over the British Indian Ocean Territory to Mauritius without consulting the Chagossian community.

== Sociolinguistics ==
Chagossian Creole is a member of the Bourbonnais Creole family and hence is closely related to other creole languages around the Indian Ocean. Lafcadio Hearn observed that in contrast to French-based creole languages in other parts of the world, the Indian Ocean creoles were influenced to some degree by the Chinese and Malagasy languages. In 1871, four coconut oil plantations existed on the Chagos Islands, each employing between 150 and 200 laborers from Mauritius, with a total population of about 690. French ethnologists identified the language spoken in the Chagos Islands as Mauritian Creole. By 1886, Hearn observed that the expansion of public schooling was starting to endanger French-based creoles except in smaller islands untouched by "the educational movement of the nineteenth century."

Chagossian Creole is mutually intelligible with Mauritian Creole and Seychellois Creole, although it has a distinct vocabulary, pronunciation, and accent such that Chagossians living in the Seychelles have reported code-switching in social situations.

== See also ==
- Creole language
- Agalega Creole
- Mauritian Creole
- Rodriguan Creole
