= List of radio stations in Mauritius =

This is a list of radio stations that broadcast in Mauritius.

== General ==
Name	Language	Operator	Frequency	Website	Listen live	Radio Status
AM (kHz)
BBC World Service	English	BBC Radio	1575	www.bbc.co.uk		External
Radio Maurice	Creole, French, Chinese	MBC	684	www.mbcradio.tv	yes	Governmental Radio
Radio Mauritius	Hindi	MBC	819	www.mbcradio.tv	yes	Governmental Radio
FM (MHz)
Best FM	Hindi, English	MBC	103.5 & 99.4 & 96.4	www.mbcradio.tv	yes	Governmental Radio
Kool FM	Creole, French, English	MBC	91.7 & 97.3 & 98.9	www.mbcradio.tv	yes	Governmental Radio
NRJ Maurice	Creole, French, Hindi, English	MBC	92.4 & 90.8 & 94.9	www.nrj.mu	yes	Governmental Radio
Radio One	French, Creole	Viva Voce Ltée	101.7 & 100.8 & 102.4	www.r1.mu	yes	Private
Radio Plus	French, Creole, Hindi	Radio Plus Ltd	87.7 & 88.6 & 89.3	radioplus.defimedia.info	yes	Private
Radio France Internationale	French	Radio France	93.2	www.rfi.fr		External
Taal FM	Hindi, Bhojpuri, Chinese	MBC	94.9 & 94.0 & 95.6	www.mbcradio.tv	yes	Governmental Radio
Top FM	Hindi, French, Creole	Top FM Ltd	105.7 & 104.4 & 106.0	www.topfmradio.com	yes	Private
Planet FM (Mauritius)	Creole, French, Hindi, English	Purely Communications Ltd	90.2 & 91.2 & 96.1	www.planetfm.mu	Permanently Off Air	Private
Wazaa FM (Mauritius)	Creole, French, Hindi, English	First Talk Ltd	100.5 & 103.2 & 106.5	www.wazaafm.mu	yes	Private
HIT FM (Mauritius)	Creole, French, Hindi, English	Mopays Ltd			yes	Private
MAURINEWS - MAURIVIBES RADIO	Creole, French, Hindi, English	MAURIVISION LTD				Private

Private

== Mauritius online radio stations ==
Name	Language	Website	Listen live
Best Of MUsic Radio (BOMR)	English	www.bestofmusicradio.com	yes
OUi Radio	English, French, Creole	www.ouiradio.com	yes
Vibes Fm Mauritius	English, French, Creole, Hindi		yes
NRJ Maurice	Creole, French	www.nrj.mu	yes
ARYON AIR	Creole, French	www.aryonair.com	yes
Radio230	Creole, French	www.radio230.com	yes
Radio Plus Hits	English, French	radioplus.defimedia.info/	yes
Radio Plus Fever	English, French, Creole	radioplus.defimedia.info/	yes
Radio Plus Indiz	Hindi, Bhojpuri, Tamil, Telugu	radioplus.defimedia.info/	yes
HitFM Maurice	Creole, French		
MAURINEWS -MAURIVIBES RADIO	Creole, French		
TAMIZEN RADIO	Tamil		
WORLD TAMIL FM	Tamil		
ONEX FM	Tamil		

== Rodrigues Island ==
Name	Language	Operator	Frequency (kHz)	Website	Listen live
AM (kHz)
Rodrigues AM	Creole, French	MBC	1206	www.mbcradio.tv	
FM (MHz)
Rodrigues FM	Creole, French	MBC	97.3	www.mbcradio.tv	
Radio France Internationale	French	Radio France	93.2	www.rfi.fr	

MAURINEWS - MAURIVIBES RADIO	Creole, French, Hindi, English	MAURIVISION LTD	Private

== See also ==
- Media of Mauritius
- List of radio stations
- List of Indian-language radio stations
- List of Chinese-language radio stations
