= Radio Plus (Mauritius) =

Private Radio Station in Mauritius

Coordinates: 20.1718718°S 57.5007039°E

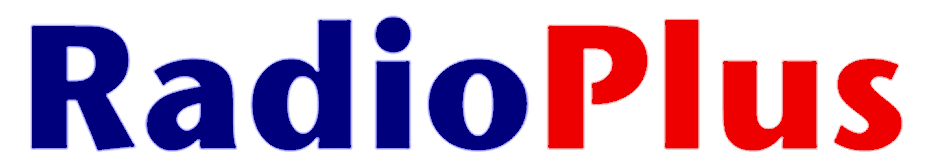
- Mauritius
- Broadcast area: Mauritius
- Frequencies: 87.7 MHz (Center); 88.6 MHz (East and West); 89.3 MHz (North and South)

Programming
- Languages: French, Hindi, Mauritian Creole

Ownership
- Owner: Le Défi Media Group; (private commercial free to air FM radio broadcasting license)

History
- First air date: 2002

Technical information

Links
- Webcast: http://radioplus.defimedia.info/radio-stations/
- Website: http://radioplus.defimedia.info/

Radioplus is a private radio station owned and broadcast by Defimedia group, a leading media and communication company in Mauritius. It started operation in 2002 with a private commercial free to air FM radio broadcasting licence issued by the Independent Broadcasting Authority - Mauritius.

Radio Plus's slogan is "Ecoute ou Pou tende" (English: Listen you will hear, French: Ecoutez vous allez entendre). It is ranked as the No. 1 radio station in Mauritius and innovates its programming programs to bring freshness to the Mauritian audience.

It operates three webradio stations:

- Radio Plus Hits - 1960s to the latest hits (French and English)
- Radio Plus Fever - Best of local music, zouk, reggae, dancehall, sega, soukouss and R'n'B
- Radio Plus Indiz - Bollywood hits, ghazals, Bhojpuri hits and other major languages Tamil, Telugu and Marathi

Radio Plus Ltd also own the Mauritian WebTV, Teleplus.

== TikTok Awards Night ==
On 23 December 2019, Radio Plus held the first TikTok Awards Night, which rewards the best Mauritian TikTokers in their respective categories, at the Caudan Arts Centre in Port Louis.

== Legal matters ==
The complaint concerned a broadcast made on 3 October 2012 in the news bulletin of the respondent at 7:00 a.m.

During the 2012 municipal elections, Radio Plus and two other radio stations, Radio One and Top FM, received a letter from the Independent Broadcasting Authority listing directives to follow the rules and regulations during the mentioned period. The Chairman of IBA accused Top FM of suspected breaches, penalising the other two private stations in an interview in le Defi Quotidien but the decision was challenged as Top FM stated that they had so far communicated all and requested the IBA to withdraw the new directives so that Radio Plus and Radio one could continue their phone-in programs.

== See also ==
- List of radio stations in Mauritius
