= Le Militant =

Weekly newspaper of the Mauritian Militant Movement

- Type: Weekly newspaper
- Editor: Ananda Rajoo
- Founded: 1970
- Political alignment: Left, Mauritian Militant Movement
- Headquarters: Port Louis
- Price: Rs10.00
- Website: www.lemilitant.com

Le Militant is the official weekly newspaper of the Mauritian Militant Movement, a left-wing socialist political party in Mauritius.

== History ==
Le Militant was rebranded from the original weekly newspaper Le Combat, published since 1969 by Heeralall Bhugaloo. Le Militant first appeared in 1970.

== Website ==
Lemilitant.com is the online version of the newspaper. It includes the free-to-download PDF version of the newspaper.

== See also ==
- List of newspapers in Mauritius
