= Bourbonnais Creole =

French-creole language of the western Indian Ocean

- Geographic distribution: Indian Ocean
- Native speakers: (undated figure of ~2,000,000)
- Linguistic classification: French Creole: Bourbonnais Creole

Language codes
- ISO 639-3: –
- Glottolog: None isle1246 (Mauritian–Seselwa) reun1238 (Réunion)

Bourbonnais Creole is the group of French-based creole languages spoken in the western Indian Ocean. The close relation of the languages is from the similar historical and cultural backgrounds of the islands. The name is derived from the former name of Réunion Island: Bourbon Island before 1793. Another name is Mascarene Creole, as the predominant island group is called the Mascarenes.

There are six languages in this group:

- Agalega Creole
- Chagossian Creole
- Mauritian Creole
- Réunion Creole
- Rodriguan Creole
- Seychellois Creole

== Bibliography ==
- Chaudenson, Robert (1974). Le Lexique du parler créole de la Réunion. Paris: Champion, tomes I-II.
- Baker, Philip & Chris Corne (1982). Isle de France Creole: Affinities and origins. Ann Arbor:Karoma.
- Faine, Jules (1939). Le créole dans l'univers: études comparatives des parlers français-créoles. Tome I: le mauricien. Port-au-Prince: Imprimerie de l'État.
- Parkvall, Mikael (2000). Out of Africa: African influences in Atlantic Creoles. London: Battlebridge.
- Wittmann, Henri (1972). Les parlers créoles des Mascareignes: une orientation. Trois-Rivières: Travaux linguistiques de l'Université du Québec à Trois-Rivières 1.
- Wittmann, Henri (1995). "Grammaire comparée des variétés coloniales du français populaire de Paris du 17e siècle et origines du français québécois." Le français des Amériques, ed. Robert Fournier & Henri Wittmann, 281-334. Trois-Rivières: Presses universitaires de Trois-Rivières.
- Wittmann, Henri (2001). "Lexical diffusion and the glottogenetics of creole French." CreoList debate, parts I-VI, appendixes 1-9. The Linguist List, Eastern Michigan University & Wayne State University.
- Wittmann, Henri & Robert Fournier (1987). "Interprétation diachronique de la morphologie verbale du créole réunionnais." Revue québécoise de linguistique théorique et appliquée 6:2.137-50.
