= Le Défi Media Group =

Mass media company in Mauritius

- Industry: Media
- Headquarters: Port Louis, Mauritius
- Key people: Director; Ehshan Kodarbux
- Products: Newspapers; Radio; Magazines; Internet
- Website: www.defimedia.info

Le Défi Media Group is a mass media company based in Port Louis, Mauritius. The group's operations include newspapers, magazines, radio and digital media. The newspapers, magazines and radio are mostly published and broadcast in French.

== Newspapers and magazines ==
The Défi group owns two magazines and some of the leading newspapers in Mauritius.

- Le Dimanche/L'Hebdo
  - This weekly newspaper are issued on Sunday and published in French Language.
- Le Défi Foot
  - Newspaper issued on Football/ Soccer.
- Le Défi Immobilier
  - This magazine are issued to tackle the Mauritian immobilier as per local demand.
- Le Défi Moteurs
  - This magazine are issued to Mauritian audience wishing to know more on automobile industry.
- Le Défi Plus
  - This is a weekly newspaper issued on Saturday and published in French Language
- Le Défi Quotidien
  - Daily newspaper come every weekdays and publish in French language. They usually accompanied with supplement such as Bollywood masala...
- Le Défi Sexo
- News On Sunday
  - News on Sunday come every Sunday and is published in English language.
- Le Défi Turf
  - Magazine for horse-racing lovers and issued during the turf season as decided by the Mauritius Turf Club.
- Le Défi Life

== Radio and Television ==
The Défimedia group is the owner of Radio Plus, a leading private radio station in Mauritius. It starts operation in 2002 and has slogan " Écouté ou pou Tendé " ( Listen you will hear) and a Web TV stations on the internet.

- TéléPlus, an online webTV for news and entertainment Programs, with the slogan " Gété ou pou Trouvé" (Look you will see).

== See also ==
- List of newspapers in Mauritius
- List of magazines in Mauritius
- List of radio stations in Mauritius
