= L'Express (Mauritius) =

Mauritian French-language daily newspaper

L'Express is a French-language daily newspaper, published in Mauritius since 1963 and owned by La Sentinelle, Ltd. L'Express endeavours to cover Mauritian news in an independent and impartial manner, as described in its code of conduct for journalists. It is the most widely-read daily newspaper in Mauritius. The Sunday version of L'Express is called L'Express Dimanche.

== See also ==
- List of newspapers in Mauritius
