= Best FM (Mauritius) =

Coordinates: 20.229811°S 57.501692°E

Mauritius
- Frequencies: 99.4 MHz (Centre); 103.5 MHz (North, South); 96.4 MHz (East, West)

Programming
- Languages: English, Hindi

Ownership
- Owner: Mauritius Broadcasting Corporation
- Sister stations: Taal FM, Radio Mauritius, Kool FM, Music FM, Radio Maurice

History
- First air date: October 2010

Technical information

Links
- Webcast: Link
- Website: www.mbcradio.tv/

Best FM is a Hindi-language entertainment radio station in Mauritius that is owned and broadcast by the Mauritius Broadcasting Corporation. The radio started operating on 5 October 2010 and is entirely dedicated to Bollywood music and has as slogan "Aur Kya Chahiye?" (What else is needed?). The radio channel opened as its sister station Taal FM which has been rebranded to a regional radio station, broadcasting shows in 13 popular languages in Mauritius.

== Programming ==
The program Naya Savera runs daily on the radio from 5 am to 7 am. A playlist runs under the title 'Non Stop Music' daily till early morning without any radio jockey. The 9-10 PM slot on weekend are attributed to various different shows.

=== Monday-Thursday ===
- Naya Savera (The New Morning)
- Morning Tadka
- Lifestyle
- Once Upon a time in Bollywood
- Bollywood Buzz
- Raftaar-Rush Hour
- Evening Lounge
- 9-10 PM special
  - Campus Time
  - The Gramophone
  - Sports Scan
  - World.com

=== Friday ===
- Naya Savera
- Morning Fun
- Love Mix
- Dil Jo Bhi Kahe (What the hearts tell)
- Popcorn
- Weekend Metro
- Afternoon Energy
- BEST FM House Music

=== Saturday ===
- Music Cafe
- Hot 20
- Spotlight
- Greeting Cards
- Sports & Music
- Dance Machine

=== Sunday ===
- Music Cafe (dedications)
- Dil Ki Yaadein (Memories of Heart)
- Bollywood Club
- Music Room
- Sunday is Out
- Meri Yaar Ki Shaadi Hai (It's my friend's wedding)
- Great Classics

== Formerly Broadcast Shows ==
- Mast Morning Show
- Day Delights
- Yaadein
- Bombay Dreams
- Rush Hour
- Sunset Manoranjan
- Aap Ki Choice
- Night Raagas
- Friday Morning Show
- Yaadein
- Bollywood Weekly
- Island Waves
- Sunset Music

== See also ==
List of radio stations in Mauritius
