= Motormag =

Mauritius car magazine

MotorMag
- Categories: Motoring, Cars
- Frequency: Monthly
- Publisher: Dubourg Editions Ltd
- First issue: December 2007
- Country: Mauritius
- Website: http://www.motormag.mu

MotorMag is a Mauritius car magazine, published monthly, and concentrating on cars and motorcycles test drives. It was launched in 2007 and is now published by Dubourg Editions Ltd. The magazine features news, road tests and buyers guides of both cars and motorcycles. The reviews and news are written mostly in French but sometimes in English also. It has a cover price of Rs.95 in Mauritius.The MotorMag office is situated in Curepipe, Mauritius.

== History ==
MotorMag magazine was launched in December 2007. It was the first car magazine to be launched in Mauritius.

== The team ==
Publishing Director: Patrick Dubourg

Managing Editor: Stephane Dubourg

Graphic Designer: Anouska Cuniah

Graphic Designer: Jean-Francois Brunet

Photographer:

Journalists: Frederick Bréville & Mathieu Appassamy

Abonnement: Shirley Myrthil

== Content ==
Regular features include:

- News and market analysis
- Green Energy
- Testdrives
- Automotive manufacturer history
- Buyer's guides
