= Robert Chaudenson =

French linguist (1937–2020)

Robert Chaudenson (12 April 1937 – 7 April 2020) was a French linguist.

== Biography ==
He was a specialist in creole languages and an emeritus professor of linguistics at the University of Provence. He was a widely known author on the subject of creolistics and president of the International Committee of Creole Studies. He was born in Lyon, and died aged 82, just 5 days before his 83rd birthday in Metropolitan France due to complications of COVID-19.

== Publications ==
- 1974. Le lexique du parler créole de la Réunion, 2 vol., Paris: Champion, 1249 p.
- 1978. "Créole et langage enfantin: phylogenèse et ontogenèse", Langue française, vol. 37, pp. 76–90.
- 1979. "A propos de la genèse du créole mauricien: le peuplement de l'Ile de France de 1721 à 1735", Etudes Créoles, 1979, n° 1, pp. 43–57.
- 1990. "Recherche, formation et créolistique", Revue Québecoise de linguistique théorique et appliquée, vol. 9, n°3, novembre 1990, pp. 287–303.
- 1992. "Les langues créoles", La Recherche, n° 248, novembre 1992, pp. 1248–1256.
- 1994. "Français d'Amérique du Nord et créoles français : le français parlé par les immigrants du XVIIème siècle", in R. Mougeon et E. Beniak (ed.), Les origines du français québecois, Presses de l'Université Laval, pp. 169–180.
- 1995. "Les français d'Amérique ou le français d'Amérique : genèse et comparaison" in H. Wittmann et R. Fournier" (ed.), Le français des Amériques, Presses universitaires de Trois-Rivières, pp. 3–19.
- 1998a. (with L.J. Calvet), Saint-Barthélemy : une énigme linguistique, Paris: Didier Erudition, 206 pages.
- 1998b. "Variation, koïnèisation, créolisation : français d’Amérique et créoles", in P. Brasseur (éd.), Français d’Amérique. Variation, créolisation, normalisation, Avignon: Presses de l'Université d'Avignon, pp. 163–179.
- 2000. Grille d’analyse des situations linguistiques, Paris: Didier Erudition, 58 pages.
- 2001. (with Salikoko Mufwene), Creolization of language and culture, London: Routledge, 340 pages.
- 2003. La créolisation : théorie, applications, implications, Paris: L'Harmattan, 480 pages.
- 2010. la genèse des créoles de l'Océan indien, Paris: L'Harmattan.
