= French-based creole languages =

Family of creole languages for which French is the lexifier

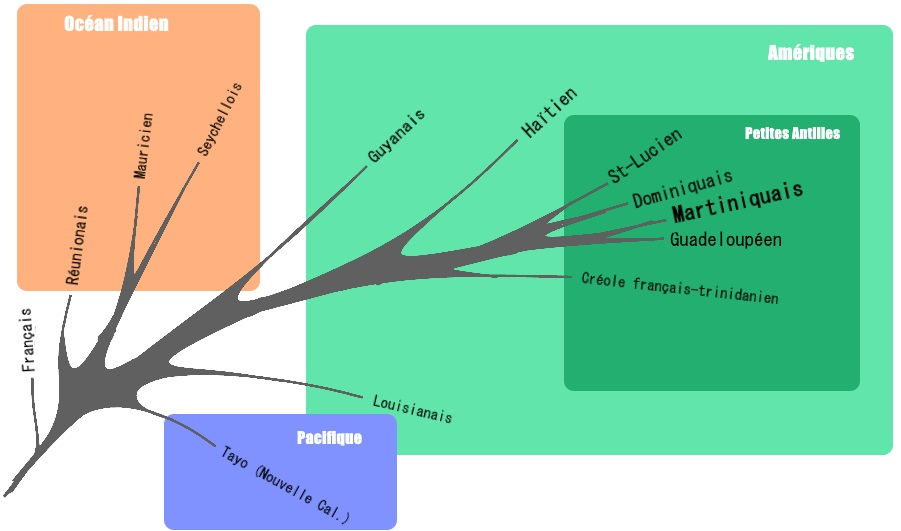
Treemap of French-based creoles

A French creole, or French-based creole language, is a creole for which French is the lexifier. Most often this lexifier is not modern French but rather a 17th- or 18th-century koiné of French from Paris, the French Atlantic harbors, and the nascent French colonies. This article also contains information on French pidgin languages, contact languages that lack native speakers.

These contact languages are not to be confused with non-creole varieties of French outside of Europe that date to colonial times, such as those from Acadia, French Louisiana, New England, or Quebec.

There are over 15.5 million speakers of some form of French-based creole languages. Haitian Creole is the most spoken creole language in the world, with over 12 million speakers.

== History ==
Throughout the 17th century, French Creoles became established as a unique ethnicity originating from the mix of French, Native, and African cultures. These French Creoles held a distinct ethno-cultural identity, a shared antique language, Creole French, and their civilization owed its existence to the overseas expansion of the French Empire.

In the eighteenth century, Creole French was the first and native language of many different peoples including those of European origin in the West Indies. French-based creole languages today are spoken natively by millions of people worldwide, primarily in the Americas and on archipelagos throughout the Indian Ocean.

== Classification ==
=== Americas ===
- Varieties with progressive aspect marker ape, derived from après
  - Haitian Creole (Kreyòl ayisyen, locally called Creole) is a language spoken primarily in Haiti: the largest French-derived language in the world, with an estimated total of 12 million fluent speakers. It is also the most-spoken creole language in the world and is based largely on 17th-century French with influences from Portuguese, Spanish, English, Taíno, and West African languages. It is an official language in Haiti.
  - Louisiana Creole (Kréyol la Lwizyàn, locally called Kourí-Viní and Creole), the Louisiana creole language.
  - Mon Louis Island Creole, closely related to Louisiana Creole, spoken by the mixed-race community on Mon Louis Island, Alabama until the death of its last speakers in the 1980s.
- Varieties with progressive aspect marker ka
  - Antillean Creole, spoken in the Lesser Antilles, particularly in Guadeloupe, Martinique, Saint Lucia and Dominica. Although all of the creoles spoken on these islands are considered to be the same language, there are noticeable differences between the dialects of each island.
  - French Guianese Creole is a language spoken in French Guiana, and to a lesser degree in Suriname and Guyana. It is closely related to Antillean Creole, but there are some noteworthy differences between the two.
  - Karipúna French Creole, spoken in Brazil, mostly in the state of Amapá. It was developed by Amerindians, with possible influences from immigrants from neighboring French Guiana and French territories of the Caribbean and with a recent lexical adstratum from Portuguese.
    - Lanc-Patuá, spoken more widely in the state of Amapá, is a variety of the former, possibly the same language.

=== Indian Ocean ===
- Varieties with progressive aspect marker ape – subsumed under a common classification as Bourbonnais Creoles
  - Mauritian Creole, spoken in Mauritius (locally Kreol)
  - Agalega creole, spoken in Agaléga Islands
  - Chagossian creole, spoken by the former population of the Chagos Archipelago
  - Réunion Creole, spoken in Réunion
  - Rodriguan creole, spoken on the island of Rodrigues
  - Seychellois Creole, spoken everywhere in the Seychelles and locally known as Kreol seselwa. It is the national language and shares official status with English and French.

=== Pacific ===
- Tayo, spoken in New Caledonia

=== Asia ===
- Tây Bồi Pidgin French, formerly spoken in Indochina

== See also ==
- Michif
- Chiac
- Camfranglais, a macaronic language of Cameroon
- Middle English creole hypothesis
