= Weekly (news magazine) =

National news magazine in Mauritius

Weekly is an English-language national news magazine published by the La Sentinelle Group in Mauritius. The magazine, which only exists on paper and direct-email PDF, has a relatively low readership, but is considered one of the most important sources of political news on the island. The magazine is known both for its news reporting, as well as its critical and often mocking editorials.

== History and profile ==
It was started as a weekly section, named Outlook, of L'Express newspaper. It became a weekly magazine in July 2012. The magazine is published on Fridays. The editor-in-chief, Touria Prayag, was temporarily banned from Mauritian Parliament in 2016 by its speaker, Maya Hanoomanjee, for a critical editorial published in Weekly on 28 April 2016.
