= Rodriguan Creole =

Mauritian Creole dialect of Rodrigues

- Rodrigues Creole, Rodriguais Creole
- Kreol rodrige
- Native to: Rodrigues
- Native speakers: 43,538 (2019)
- Language family: French Creole: Bourbonnais Creoles; Mauritian Creole; Rodriguan Creole
- Writing system: Latin

Language codes
- ISO 639-3: –
- Linguist List: mfe-rod
- Glottolog: None
- Linguasphere: 51-AAC-ced
- IETF: mfe-u-sd-muro
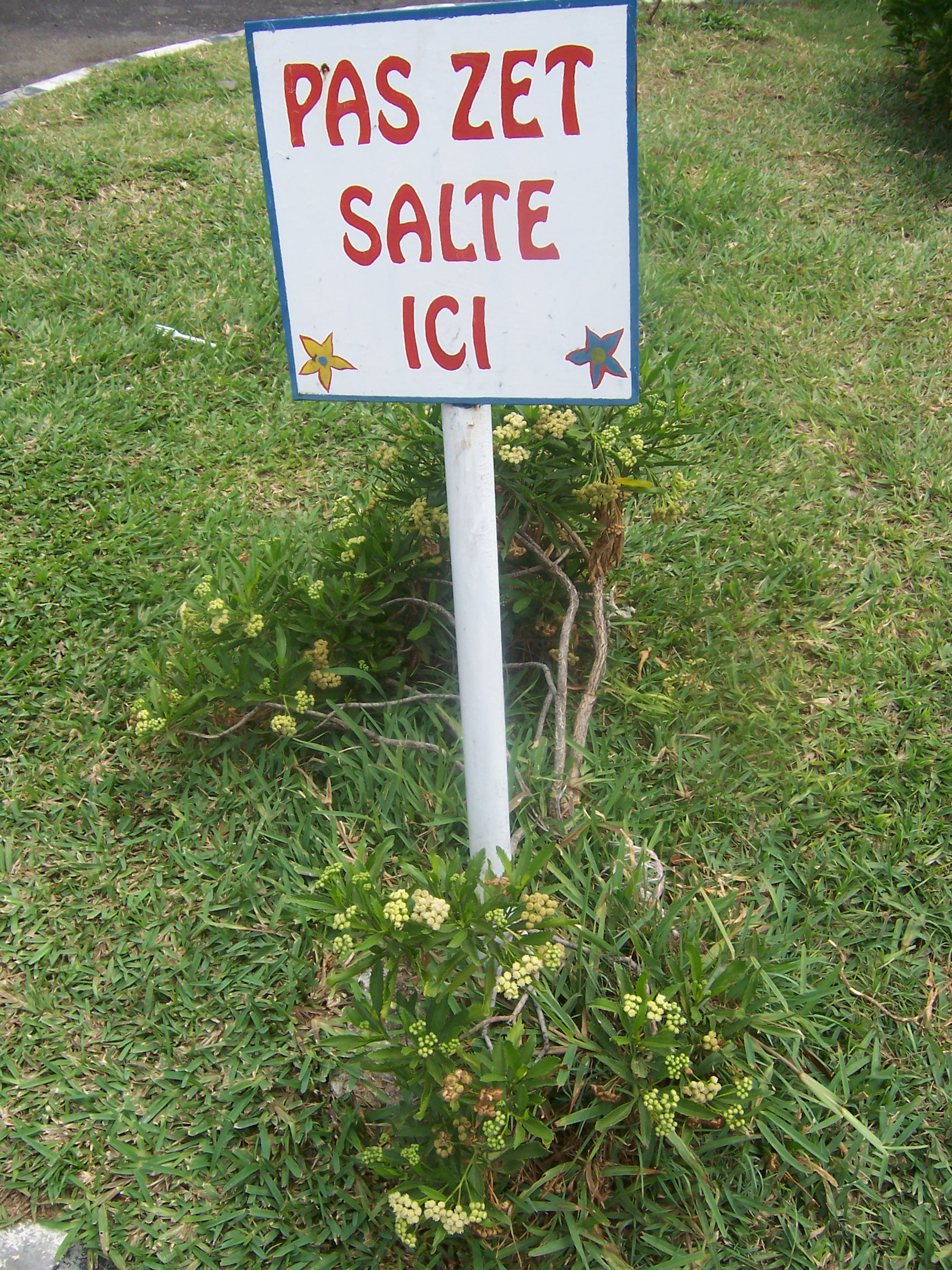
- Public warning in the Rodriguan variety of Mauritian Creole in Port Mathurin (pas zet salte ici: don't throw litter here; the term is from French saleté, 'filth')

Rodriguan Creole is a dialect of Mauritian Creole, a French-based creole language, spoken on the island of Rodrigues in the Indian Ocean. It is spoken by virtually all of the inhabitants of the island. On Rodrigues, like in the rest of the republic of Mauritius, English is the administrative language and French is also widely spoken, even more commonly than English. Rodriguan Creole is very similar to French, which is why it is sometimes called a dialect of French.

== Glossary ==
Rodriguan Creole	English
Bonzur!	Good morning!
Bonsoir!	Good evening!
Merci!	Thank You!
Ouais	Yes
Non	No
Aurevoir!	Bye!
Ene	One (1)
D	Two (2)
Trwa	Three (3)

== Literature ==
- C. Corne und P. Stein: Pour une étude du créole rodriguais. In: Etudes Créoles Paris , 1979, vol. 2, no. 1, S. 58–84.
- Henri Wittmann: Les parlers créoles des Mascareignes : une orientation. Travaux linguistiques de l'Université du Québec à Trois-Rivières, 1. 3e version revue, Trois-Rivières 1972.

== See also ==
- Creole language
- Agalega creole
- Mauritian Creole
- Chagossian Creole
