= Le Défi Plus =

- Type: Weekly newspaper
- Founded: 1996
- Headquarters: Port Louis, Mauritius, Mascarene Islands, Indian Ocean
- Price: Rs10.00
- Website: www.defimedia.info

Le Défi Plus is a Mauritian weekly newspaper. Founded in 1996, the newspaper is based in Port Louis.
