= Seychellois Creole =

French-based creole language spoken in Seychelles

- kreol, seselwa
- Native to: Seychelles
- Ethnicity: Seychellois Creoles
- Native speakers: 127,000 (2025)
- Language family: French Creole: Bourbonnais Creole; Seychellois Creole
- Dialects: Chagossian Creole
- Writing system: Latin

Official status
- Official language in: Seychelles
- Regulated by: Lenstiti Kreol

Language codes
- ISO 639-3: crs
- Glottolog: sese1246
- Linguasphere: 51-AAC-cea
- Location of Seychelles where the creole is spoken
- Seychellois Creole audio sample A woman speaking in Seychellois Creole about the benefits of an app developed by SEYCCAT (Seychelles’ Conservation and Climate Adaptation Trust) that helps protect the ocean.

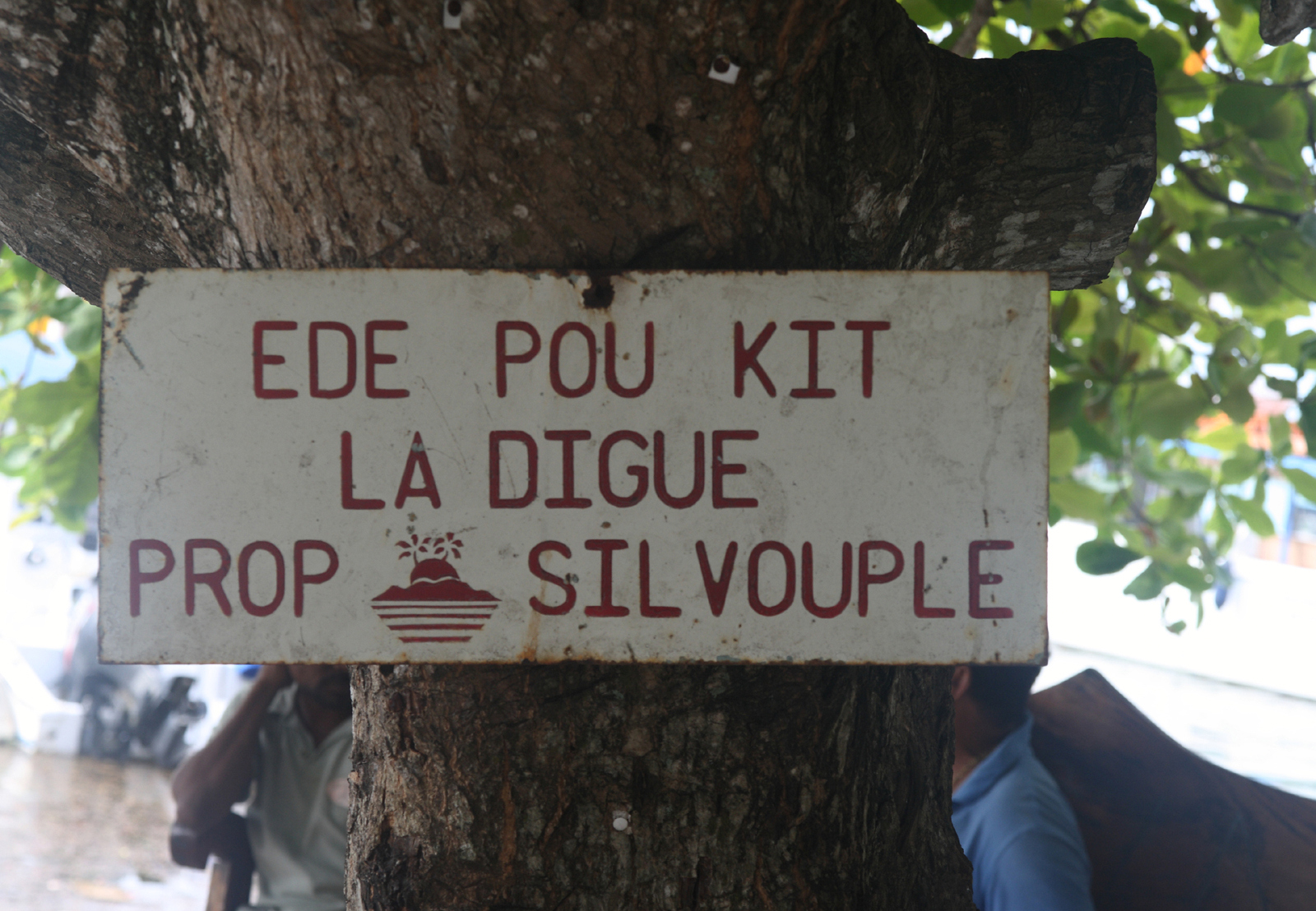
Sign in Seychellois Creole, La Digue. Ede pou kit La Digue prop silvouple, meaning 'Please help to keep La Digue clean'.

Seychellois Creole (/seɪˈʃɛlwɑː/), also known as Kreol, Seselwa Creole French, and Seselwa Creole is the French-based creole language spoken by the Seychelles Creole people of the Seychelles. It is one of the national languages of the Seychelles.

== History ==
The Seychelles were first settled in 1770, by French settlers from the island of Mauritius. The islands population was mostly made up of slaves with a few whites and free blacks. Over time the Mauritian creole that was spoken by the slave population diverged enough from Mauritian Creole to be considered its own creole separate from Mauritian Creole. It further diverged after the freeing of Seychelles slaves in 1835 and the subsequent influx of Bantu peoples from East Africa to the islands.

49 fables of La Fontaine were adapted to the dialect around 1900 by Rodolphine Young (1860–1932) but these remained unpublished until 1983.

== Status ==
The Seychelles gained independence in 1976 and since 1978 Seychellois Creole has been one of the country's three official languages. It is currently the native language of over 99% of the country's population. Seychellois Creole is the primary language of music, literature, politics, public usage, and mass media in the Seychelles, though Seychellois literature has been increasingly replaced by English literature.

While Seychellois laws are written in English, the working language of the National Assembly is Creole and the verbatim record of its meetings provides an extensive corpus for its contemporary use in a formal setting.

In 2024, Google announced it would be adding Seychellois Creole to Google Translate; it was added under the name Seselwa Creole French.

== Morphology and syntax ==
Seychellois Creole follows in subject verb object word order.

=== Pronouns ===
Pronouns in Seychellois Creole fall into three categories: dependent subject, independent subject, and adnominal possessive, with there being no gender distinctions. dependent pronouns can only be subjects not objects but independent pronouns can be both.

	Dependent	Independent	Adnominal possessive
1st singular	mon	mwan	mon
2nd singular	ou	ou	ou
3rd singular	i	li	son
1st plural	nou	nou	nou
2nd plural	zot	zot	zot
3rd plural	zot	zot	zot

=== Verbs ===
Verbs in Seychellois Creole take one of two forms, long and short. Short verbs are used when the verb is directly followed by a noun or when an adverb is present and the long verbs being used otherwise.

Long vs Short verbs
Long Verb	Short Verb
retourn-en	retourn
donn-en	donn
sant-e	sant

Causative voice are marked by the word fer ('make') while reflexive voice is marked with either the express lack of a marking; or the words li, mekor, and limenm.

== Dialects ==
There is some variation in the language spoken in the Seychelles based on geography with limited differences in morphosyntax and lexicon, but not enough to speak of separate dialects. The only distinct non-standard dialect of Seychellois Creole is Chagossian Creole spoken by Chagossians in the United Kingdom, Mauritius, and the Seychelles.

== Lexicon ==
In several Seychellois Creole words derived from French, the French definite article (le, la and les) has become part of the word; for example, 'future' is lavenir (French: l'avenir). The possessive is the same as the pronoun, so that 'our future' is nou lavenir. Similarly in the plural, les Îles Éloignées Seychelles in French ('the Outer Seychelles Islands') has become Zil Elwanyen Sesel in Creole. Note the z in Zil — in French, les Îles is pronounced /le.z‿il/, with liaison.

Language	Word										
Creole	nou		tou	bezwen		travay	ansanm	pou	kre	nou	lavenir
French (IPA)	/nu‿z/	/a.vɔ̃/	/tus/	/bə.zwɛ̃/	/də/	/tʁa.va.je/	/ɑ̃.sɑ̃bl/	/puʁ/	/kʁe.e/	/nɔtʁ/	/av.niʁ/
French	Nous	avons	tous	besoin	de	travailler	ensemble	pour	créer	notre	avenir
Translation	we		all	need	to	work	together	to	create	our	future
Gloss	we	have	all	need	to	work	together	for	create	our	future

=== Loanwords ===
Percentages of loanwords from different languages in different word types
	English	French	Eastern Bantu	Malagasy	Indian Languages	Portuguese	African languages	Chinese	Arabic	Unknown	Total Loanwords	Non loanwords
Nouns	5.6%	2.6%	2%	1.3%	0.9%	0.7%	0.3%	0.1%	0.1%	1.1%	14.6%	85.4%
Verbs	2.4%	0.2%	0.2%	0.8%			0.2%			0.2%	4.1%	95.9%
Adjectives	2.2%		1.6%	1.4%	2.2%						7.3%	92.7%
Adverbs											0%	100%
Function Words				0.9%							0.9%	99.1%
total	4.2%	1.6%	1.4%	1.2%	0.9%	0.4%	0.2%	0.1%	0.1%	0.7%	10.7%	89.3%

Among loanwords in Seychellois Creole they have different frequencies words for the modern world, warfare/hunting, food and drink, animals, and the home show loanword rates over 10 percent. while words relating to cognition, emotions, social and political relationships, and the physical world show no loanwords.

== Samples ==
(Lord's Prayer)

Seychellois Creole

Ou, nou papa ki dan lesyel,
Fer ou ganny rekonnet konman Bondye.
Ki ou renny i arive.
Ki ou lavolonte i ganny realize
Lo later parey i ete dan lesyel
Donn nou sak zour nou dipen ki nou bezwen.
Pardonn nou pour bann lofans
Ki noun fer anver ou,
Parey nou pardonn sa ki n ofans nou.
Pa les tantasyon domin nou,
Me tir nou dan lemal.

Translation:
English

Our Father who art in heaven,
hallowed be thy name;
thy kingdom come;
Thy will be done on earth
as it is in heaven.
Give us this day our daily bread,
and forgive us our trespasses,
as we forgive those who trespass against us,
and lead us not into temptation,
but deliver us from evil.

Article 1 of the Universal Declaration of Human Rights in Seychellois Creole:

Nou tou imen nou’n ne dan laliberte ek legalite, dan nou dignite ek nou bann drwa. Nou tou nou annan kapasite pou rezonnen, e fodre nou azir anver lezot avek en lespri fraternel.

Article 1 of the Universal Declaration of Human Rights in English:

All human beings are born free and equal in dignity and rights. They are endowed with reason and conscience and should act towards one another in a spirit of brotherhood.
