= Top FM (Mauritius) =

Private Radio Station in Mauritius

Coordinates: 20.164147°S 57.493672°E

TOP FM
- Port Louis; Mauritius
- Broadcast area: Mauritius
- Frequencies: 105.7 MHz (East/West); 104.4 MHz (Centre); 106.0 MHz (North/South)

Programming
- Languages: Bhojpuri, Creole, English, French, Hindi

Ownership
- Owner: TOP FM Ltd; (Private Commercial Free to Air FM Radio broadcasting license)
- Sister stations: TopTV Mauritius

History
- First air date: 31 December 2002

Technical information

Links
- Webcast: http://www.topfmradio.com/radio.html
- Website: www.topfmradio.com

Top FM is a private radio station in Mauritius, owned and broadcast by Top FM Ltd which is headquartered on the 7th floor of The Peninsula Caudan Port Louis. It started operations on 31 December 2002 with a private commercial free-to-air FM radio broadcasting licence issued by the Independent Broadcasting Authority of Mauritius. The station's core audience is between 15 and 50 years, with ratings indicating loyalty of more than 65% and Opportunity to Hear (OTH) of over 1,800,000 every week.

The station launched an associated news web TV channel, Top TV Mauritius.

== Awards ==
Top FM and Top TV Mauritius have been awarded the Transparency Mauritius Investigative Journalism Award 2015 for its investigation titled Le décès de Iqbal Toofanny.
