= Réunion Creole =

French-based creole language spoken on Réunion Island

Reunionese Creole
- kréol rénioné, kréol rényoné
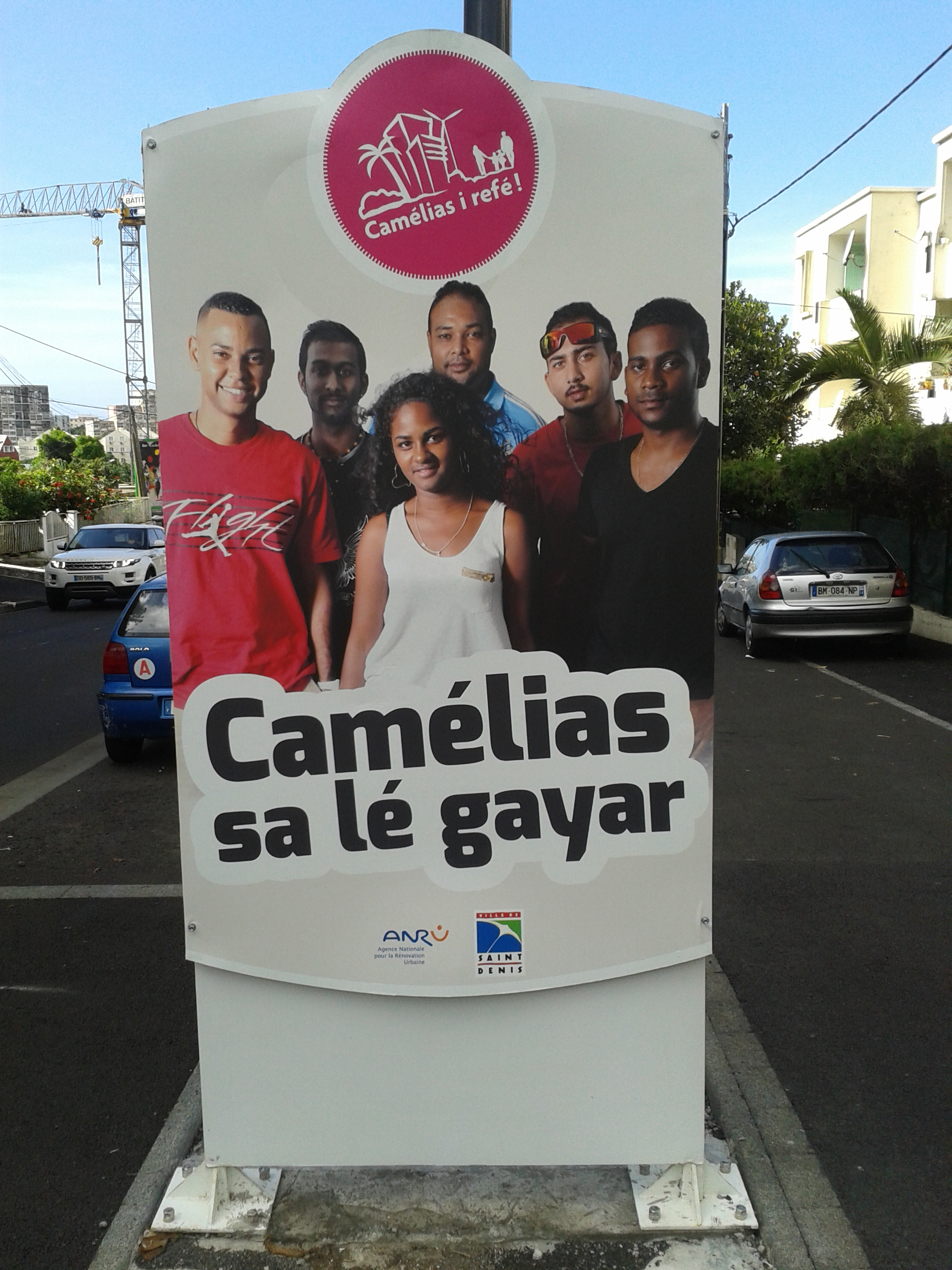
- Sign in Réunionese Creole
- Native to: Réunion
- Native speakers: (560,000 cited 1987)
- Language family: French Creole: Bourbonnais Creoles; Reunionese Creole

Official status
- Official language in: Réunion

Language codes
- ISO 639-3: rcf
- Glottolog: reun1238
- Linguasphere: 51-AAC-cf

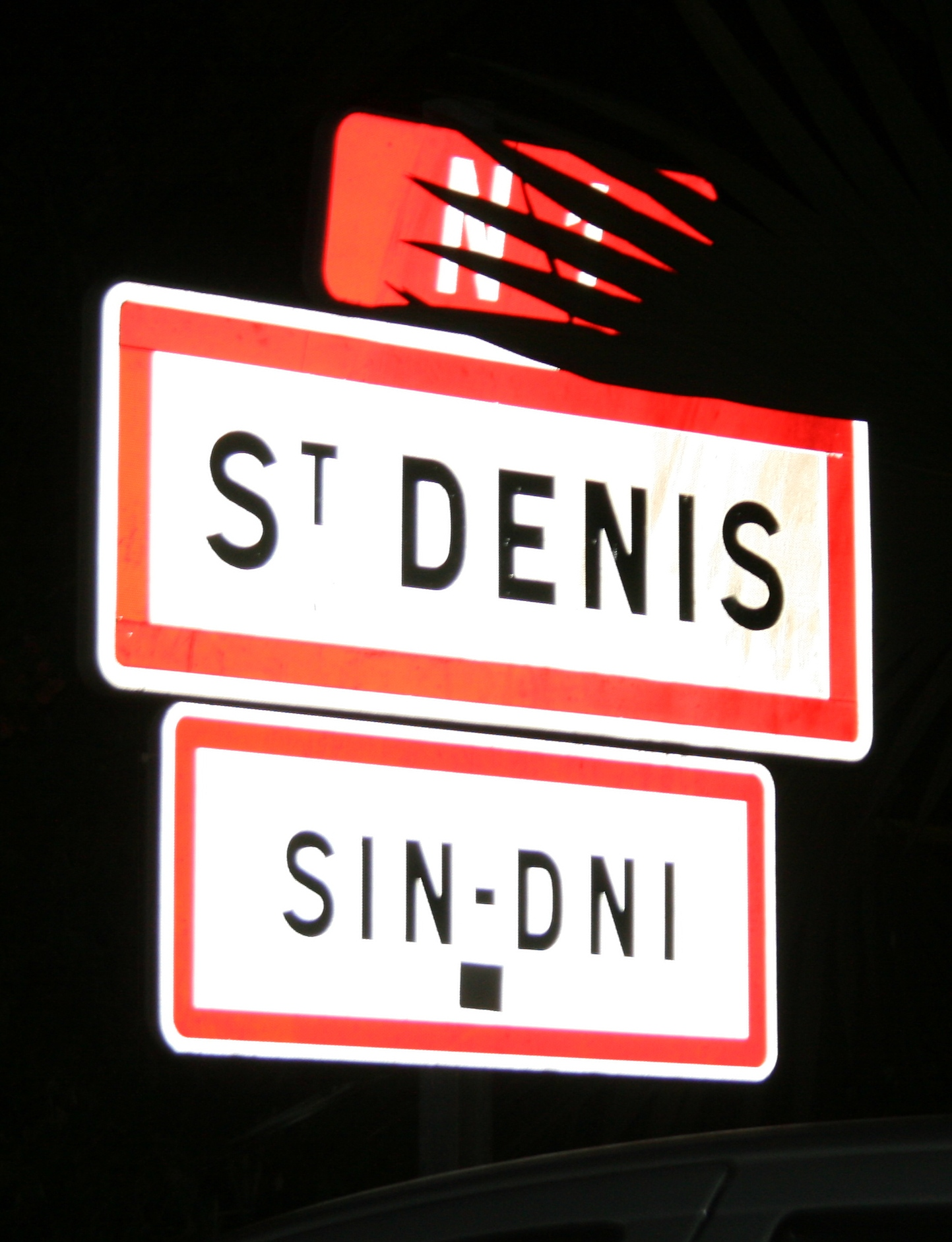
Entrance to the city of Saint-Denis in a bilingual version.

Reunion Creole, or Reunionese Creole (Reunionese Creole: kréol rénioné or kréol rényoné; French: créole réunionnais), is a French-based creole language spoken on Réunion. It is derived mainly from French and includes terms from Malagasy, Hindi, Portuguese, Gujarati and Tamil. In recent years, there has been an effort to develop a spelling dictionary and grammar rules. Partly because of the lack of an official orthography but also because schools are taught in French, Réunion Creole is rarely written. Notably, two translations of the French comic Asterix have been published. It is now the native language of 90% of the island's population.

== History and culture ==
=== Use and distribution ===
Réunion Creole is the main vernacular of the island and is used in most colloquial and familiar settings. It is, however, in a state of diglossia with French as the high language – Réunion Creole is used in informal settings and conversations, while French is the language of writing, education, administration and more formal conversations. Reunionese Creole first formed within the first 50 years of Reunion being inhabited. Most of the people living in Reunion were French, Malagasy or Indo-Portuguese. Most families at this time had at least one native French speaker. Réunion Creole is not a fully creole language like Mauritian Creole. Instead of moving away from French, Réunion Creole is moving closer to it due to the influence of French media in everyday life.

=== Varieties ===
There is not a significant class difference in the varieties of Réunion Creole due to migration and mixing within the population. It is more similar to regional dialects: for example, Parisians do not speak like Marseillaises. Réunion residents from the northern and coastal regions prefer the "i" sound for the subject pronoun "li" ("lui"), rather than the "u" sound = "lu" used in High Creole and in the south. Today, "zordi" is used in Low Creole (Kreol Kaf) and "jordi" in High Creole (Kreol Blan).

=== Writing ===
Although there have been some instances of written Réunion Creole in the 1820s, it was mainly a spoken language. One example of this is the Creole Fables of Louis Héry published in 1828, although it did not receive much popularity due to Réunion Creole being a young language. Therefore, grammar documentation and dictionaries have been written and the use of Réunion Creole has been encouraged in media. However, there is no consensus on a standardized spelling.

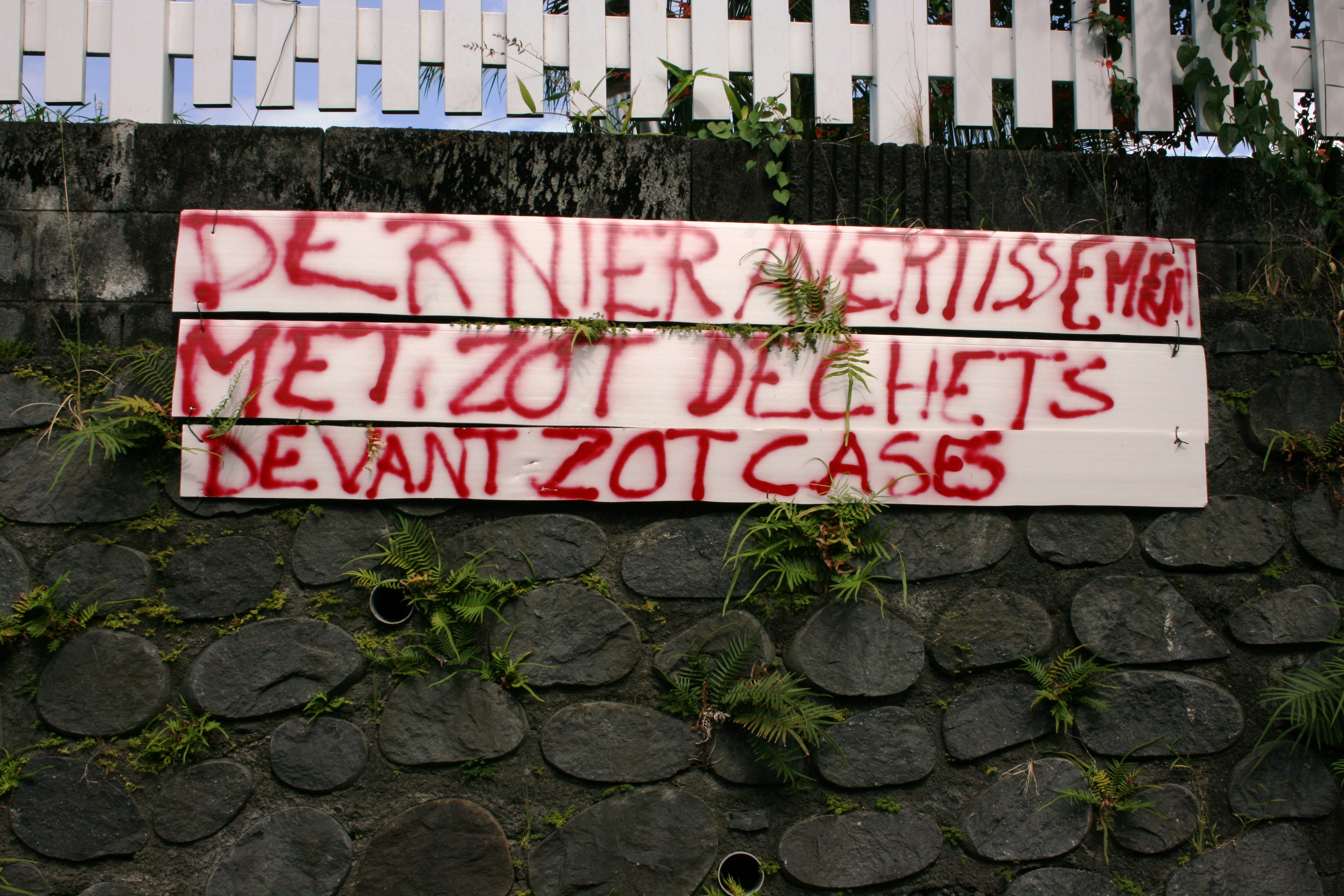
Sign in Creole, Saint-André. Dernier avertissement: Met zot dechets devant zot cases. ("Final notice: Put your rubbish in front of your houses.")

== See also ==
- Réunionnais literature
- Reunionaise Cuisine (in French)

== Bibliography ==
- Gunet, Armand (2003). Le Grand Lexique Créole de l'Ile de la Réunion. Azalées Éditions. ISBN 2-913158-52-8.
- Marion, Pascal (2009), Dictionnaire étymologique du créole réunionnais, mots d'origine asiatique, Carré de sucre, ISBN 978-2-9529135-0-8
