= Mauritian Creole =

French-based creole language spoken in Mauritius

- kreol morisien, morisien
- Pronunciation: [kʁeol moʁisjɛ̃, - moʁiʃɛ̃]
- Native to: Mauritius
- Region: Indian Ocean
- Ethnicity: Mauritian Creoles, but spoken as a lingua franca by the entire population
- Native speakers: 1,090,000 (2012 UNSD); 1,335,000 total speakers L2 speakers: 200,000 (2016)
- Language family: French Creole: Bourbonnais Creole; Mauritian Creole
- Dialects: Agalega Chagossian Rodriguan
- Writing system: Latin

Official status
- Recognised minority language in: Mauritius
- Regulated by: Akademi Kreol Morisien (Mauritian Creole Academy)

Language codes
- ISO 639-3: mfe
- Glottolog: mori1278
- Linguasphere: 51-AAC-cec
- Mauritian Creole audio sample Roselyn Augustin, an 86-year-old Mauritian woman and harmonica player, speaks in Mauritian Creole about the fact that her grandchildren no longer play the harmonica and how she learned it from her father.

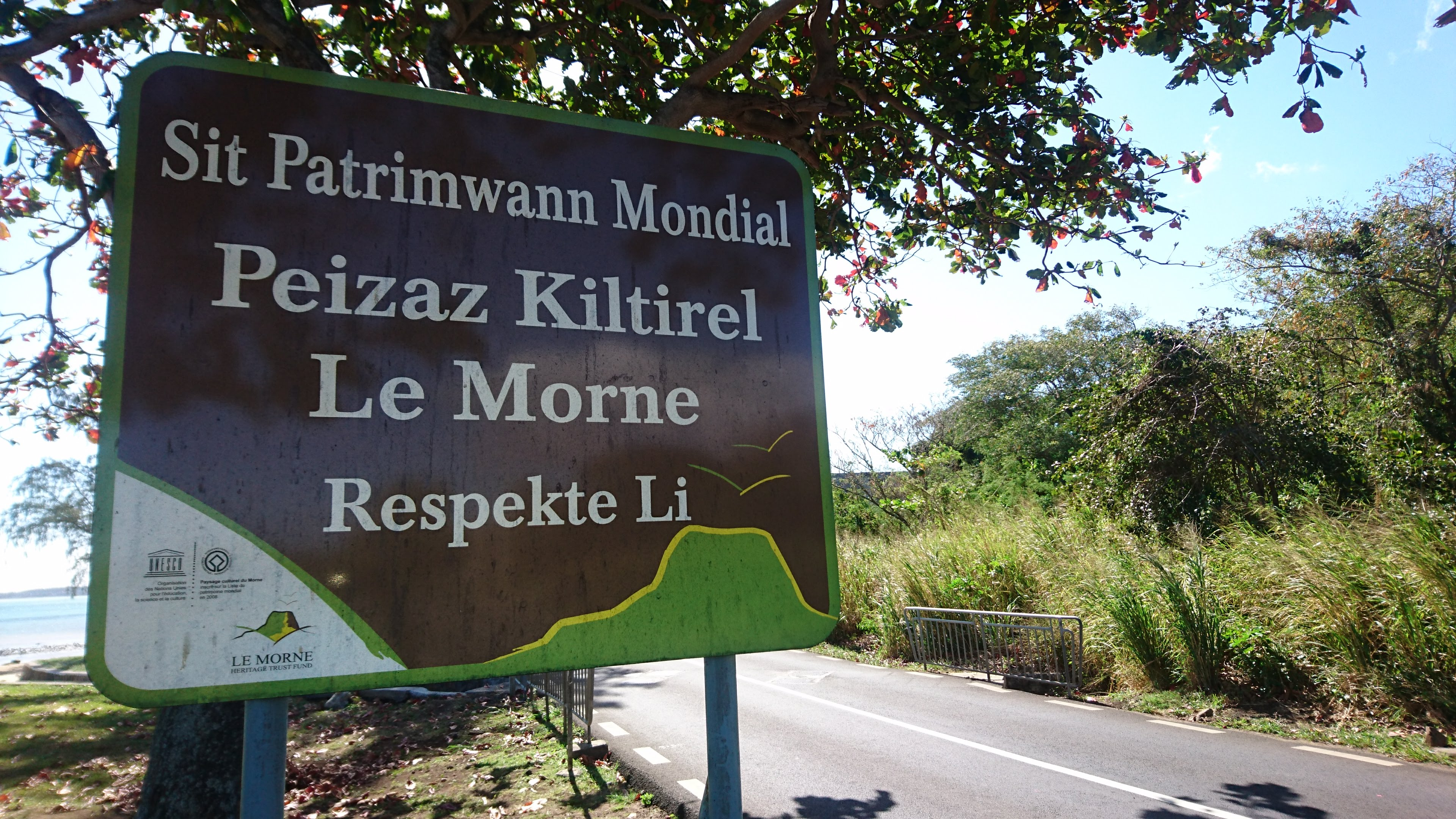
A sign post written in Mauritian Creole.

Mauritian Creole or Morisien (formerly spelled Morisyen; native name: kreol morisien [kʁeol moʁisjɛ̃, - moʁiʃɛ̃]) is a French-based creole language spoken in Mauritius. English words are included in the standardized version of the language. In addition, the enslaved people and indentured servants from cultures in Africa and Asia left a diverse legacy of language in the country. The words spoken by these groups are also incorporated into contemporary Morisien.

Mauritian Creole is the lingua franca of the Republic of Mauritius, which gained independence from the United Kingdom in 1968. Both English and French are used as alternatives to Mauritian Creole. English is spoken primarily for administration and educational purposes and French is used by the media and as a second language.

Mauritians tend to speak Mauritian Creole at home, French in the workplace and ancestral Asian languages at cultural and religious events. French and English are taught in schools where Mauritian Creole and ancestral Asian languages are proposed as options. Though Mauritians are of numerous ethnic origins (including Indian, African, European, and Chinese) Mauritian Creole has gradually replaced the ancestral languages of most of the population to become the primary home language of the country. Today, around 1.3 million people speak the language.

== Classification ==
Mauritian Creole is a French-based creole language that may be related to the Seychellois, Rodriguan, and Chagossian Creoles. Linguists disagree over the relationship, if any, of Mauritian Creole to other creole language examples in other parts of the world. Robert Chaudenson and Henri Wittmann hypothesize that Mauritian Creole is closely related to Réunion Creole. However, Philip Baker and Chris Corne have argued that Réunionnais influence on Mauritian was minimal and that the two languages are no more similar to each other than they are to other French-based creoles.

== History ==
The Portuguese were the first Europeans to visit Mauritius, but they did not settle there. Only a small portion of Mauritian vocabulary derives from the Portuguese element in European maritime jargon (e.g., the Mediterranean Lingua Franca) or from enslaved Africans or Asians who came from areas in which Portuguese was used as a trade language (e.g., Angola and Mozambique). Similarly, the Dutch had a colony on Mauritius from 1638 to 1710, but ultimately evacuated to Réunion. A few runaway slaves remained, leaving no discernible impact on the Mauritian language.

The French ultimately claimed Mauritius and first settled it from 1715 to 1721, building a plantation economy based on slave labour. People from West and Southeast Africa came to form 85% of the population by 1777, which led to linguistic fragmentation. The size of the native French settler population on the island remained small and the enslaved population lacked formal education. The common language that developed was based on French, but a dialect that differed greatly from the language spoken by the slave owners. Mechanistically, this was similar to the process of creolization in other parts of the world. The pidgin language used for daily communication by people from varying linguistic backgrounds eventually became the native language of children born in these communities. Eventually, this evolved into a creole language, with the complexity and completeness required for young children to use it as their mother tongue. Historical documents from as early as 1773 note the "creole language" that the slaves spoke.

The British took over Mauritius during the Napoleonic era, but few native English speakers ever settled there. Mauritian Creole had already been firmly entrenched and continued to be the language used after British occupation began.

The abolition of slavery in the 1830s made many Africans leave the plantations. Indentured workers from India were brought to replace the freed slaves. The widely variable linguistic background of these immigrants mirrored that of the African slaves before them; therefore, no native language was dominant enough to become the basis for a shared language. Though Indians soon became the majority population on the island, their own linguistic fragmentation, as well as their alienation from the English- and French-speaking plantation owners, led them to take up Mauritian Creole as their lingua franca.

The native English and French population have long enjoyed greater social status, in addition to dominating government, business, education, and the media; however, Mauritian Creole's popularity in most informal domains has persisted, with around 85% of the population speaking this language.

== Phonology ==
The phonology of Mauritian Creole is very similar to that of Standard French. However, French /ʃ/ and /ʒ/ have respectively depalatalised to /s/ and /z/ in Mauritian, and the front vowels /y/ and /ø/ have respectively been unrounded to /i/ and /e/.

The consonant /t/ and /d/ undergoes palatalisation when it occurs before the vowel /i/. This process causes the /t/ and /d/ to sound more like /tɕ/ and /dʑ/. The word tifi (meaning girl) would be more pronounced as tɕifi, rather than tifi.

Consonants
		Labial	Alveolar	Post-alveolar	Palatal	Velar	Uvular
Plosive	Voiceless	p	t		t̠ʲ	k	
Plosive	Voiced	b	d		d̠ʲ	ɡ	
Affricate	Voiceless			(tʃ)			
Affricate	Voiced			(dʒ)			
Nasal	Voiced	m	n		ɲ	ŋ	
Fricative	Voiceless	f	s	(ʃ)			
Fricative	Voiced	v	z	(ʒ)			ʁ
Approximant		w	l		j		

Vowels
		Front	Back
Close	Unrounded	i	
Close	Rounded	(y)	u/uː
Close-mid	Unrounded	e	
Close-mid	Rounded	(ø)	o/oː
Open-mid	Unrounded	ɛ	
Open	Unrounded	a	ɑ

		Front	Back
Close-mid	Rounded		õ
Open-mid	Unrounded	ɛ̃	
Open	Rounded		ɑ̃

IPA	Example
i	minn (noodles)
e	net (completely)
ɛ	enn (one)
a	lakaz (house)
ɑ	sarye (to carry)
o	kot (where)
oː	lord (tidiness)
u	tou (all)
uː	kourpa (snail)
ɑ̃	nanye (nothing)
ɛ̃	linz (clothes)
õ	ziromon (pumpkin)

== Orthography ==
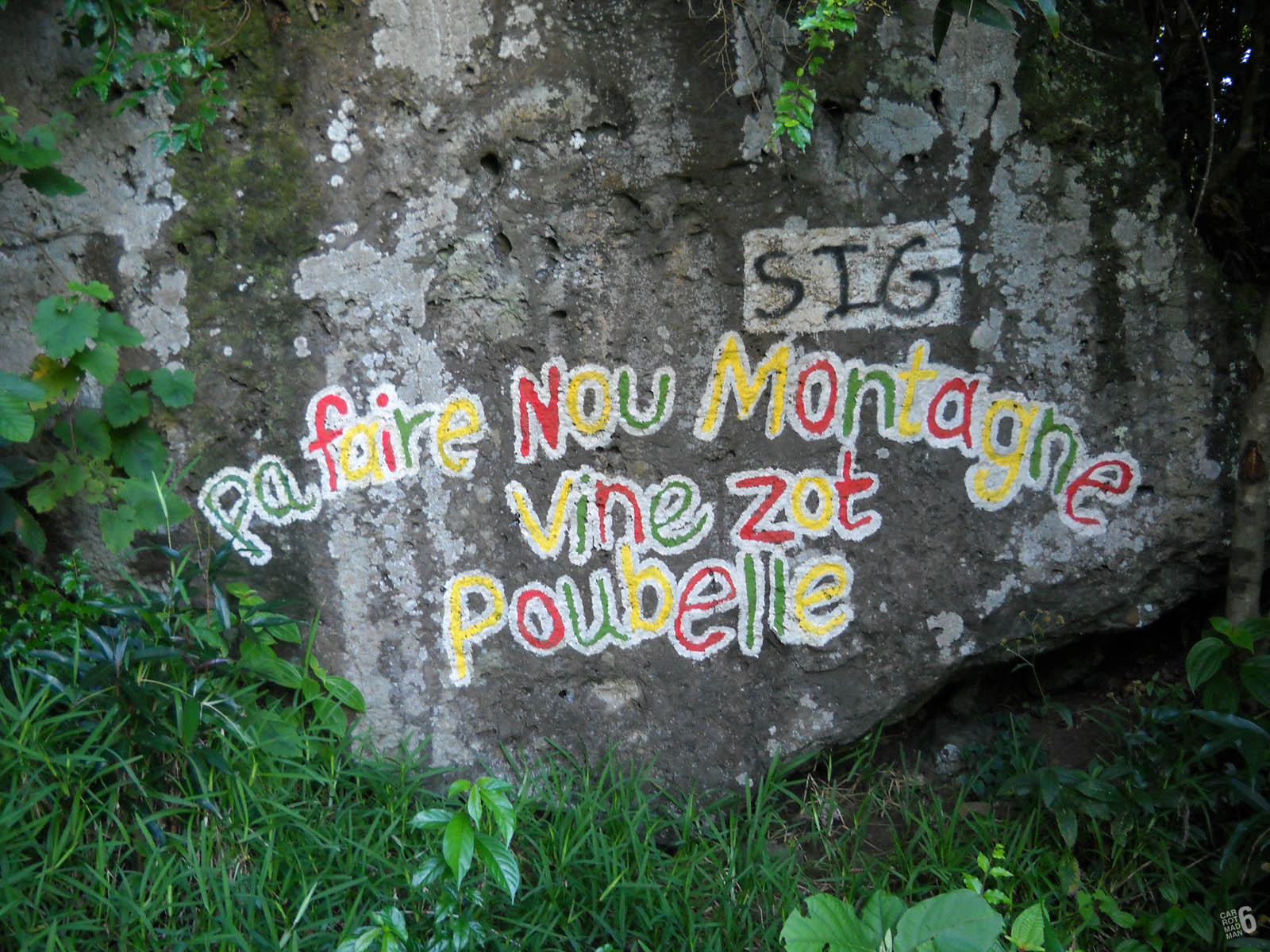
Graffiti on Le Pouce: Pa faire nou montagne vine zot poubelle, "Do not make our mountain become your trashcan."

The language has several published dictionaries, both monolingual and bilingual, written by authors such as Philip Baker (1987) and Arnaud Carpooran (2005, 2009, 2011). The number of publications is increasing steadily; however, the orthographies used in them are significantly different.

The Mauritian government began supporting an orthographic reform in 2011, with a system that generally follows French but eliminates silent letters and reduces the number of different ways in which the same sound can be written. It was codified in the Lortograf Kreol Morisien (2011) and used in the Gramer Kreol Morisien (2012) as well. The language became standard upon the publication of the second edition of the Diksioner Morisien.

== Sample vocabulary ==
=== Numbers ===
Examples shown are in Mauritian Creole and French only.

Number	Mauritian Creole	French	Number	Mauritian Creole	French
0	Zero	Zéro	20	Vin	Vingt
1	Enn	Un/Une	21	Vint-e-enn	Vingt et un
2	De	Deux	22	Vennde	Vingt-deux
3	Trwa	Trois	23	Venntrwa	Vingt-trois
4	Kat	Quatre	24	Vennkat	Vingt-quatre
5	Sink	Cinq	25	Vennsink	Vingt-cinq
6	Sis	Six	26	Vennsis	Vingt-six
7	Set	Sept	27	Vennset	Vingt-sept
8	Wit	Huit	28	Vintwit	Vingt-huit
9	Nef	Neuf	29	Vintnef	Vingt-neuf
10	Dis	Dix	30	Trant	Trente
11	Onz	Onze	40	Karant	Quarante
12	Douz	Douze	50	Sinkant	Cinquante
13	Trez	Treize	60	Swasant	Soixante
14	Katorz	Quatorze	70	Swasann-dis/Septant	Soixante-dix/Septante
15	Kinz	Quinze	80	Katrovin/Oktant	Quatre-vingts/Octante
16	Sez	Seize	90	Katrovin-dis/Nonant	Quatre-vingt-dix/Nonante
17	Diset	Dix-sept	100	San	Cent
18	Dizwit	Dix-huit	1000	Mil	Mille
19	Diznef	Dix-neuf	1000000	Enn milion	Un million

=== Pronouns ===
Examples shown are in English, Mauritian Creole and French.

English	Mauritian Creole	French
I, My	Mo	Je, Mon/Ma/Mes
You, Your (informal)	To	Tu, Ton/Ta/Tes
He/She/It, His/Her/Its	Li, So	Il/Elle, Son/Sa/Ses
We, Our	Nou	Nous, Nôtre/Nos
You, Your (pl)	Zot (autres)	Vous, Vôtre/Vos
You, Your (formal)	Ou	Vous, Vôtre/Vos
They Their	Bann-la, Zot Zot (autres)	Ils/Elles, Leur
Me (obj)	Mwa	Moi
You (obj)	Twa	Toi
Him/Her/It (obj)	Li	Le/La/Lui
Us (obj)	Nou	Nous
You (pl, obj)	Zot (autres)	Vous
You (formal, obj)	Ou	Vous
Them (obj)	Zot (autres) Bann-la	Eux

- *pl means plural
- *obj means object

=== Interrogative pronouns ===
English	Mauritian Creole	French
Who	Kisann-la	Qui
What	Kwa/Ki	Quoi
When	Kan	Quand
Where	Kot/Kote/Ki kote	Où
Why	Kifer	Pourquoi
Which	Ki/Lekel (which one)	Quelle

=== Directions ===
English	Mauritian Creole	French
In front (of)	Devan, Drwat	Devant
Before	Avan	Avant
Behind	Deryer	Derrière
Over there	Laba	Là-bas
Right	Drwat	Droite
Left	Gos	Gauche
(To the) right	Adrwat	À droite
(To the) left	Agos	À gauche
Above	Lao/Lor	Sur (là-haut)
Below	Anba	Sous (en-bas)
Next to	Akote	À côté
Outside	Deor	Dehors
Inside	Andan	Dedans

=== Tamil loanwords ===
Creole	Tamil	Meaning
Kali	கள்ளி kaḷḷi	Cactus
Notchi	நொச்சி Nocci	Vitex
Mourkou	முறுக்கு Muṟukku	Snake-shaped sweet
Vetiver	வெட்டிவேர் Veṭṭivēr	Chrysopogon zizanioides
At	அட்டா Aṭṭā	Annona reticulata (custard apple)
Pipangay	பீர்க்கங்காய் Pīrkkaṅkāy	Luffa
Mouroum	முருங்கை Muruṅkai	Moringa
Patol	புடோல் Puṭōl	Trichosanthes cucumerina
Avrayka	அவரைக்காய் Avaraikkāy	Lablab purpureus
Kotaranga	கொத்தவரங்காய் Kottavaraṅkāy	Guar
Kotomili	கொத்தமல்லி Kottamalli	Coriander
Kari-poule	கருவேப்பிலை Karuvēppilai	Murraya koenigii
Betel	வெற்றிலை Veṟṟilai	Betel
Pak	பாக்கு Pākku	Areca nut
Poutou	புட்டு Puṭṭu	a rice dish called puṭṭu
Ounde	உருண்டை Urundai	A sphere-shaped confection
Ayo!	ஐயோ Ayyo!	Alas! (exclamation)
Kaandi	கரண்டி Karandi	A kind of spoon or ladle
Mang	மாம்பழம் Maam Palam	Mango

=== Altered French words ===
Most words in Mauritian Creole can be found in French, but some have altered meaning or is considered literary in French whilst in Mauritian Creole, it is still common or somewhat used.

English	Mauritian Creole	Original French Word	French	Example Sentence	Example Sentence in English
To use	Servi	Servir (to serve)	Utiliser	To pe servi enn kreyon	You are using a pencil
To get/have	Gagn(e)	Gagner (to win)	Obtenir/Avoir	Li pe gagn fre!	She is getting cold/She is cold!
To like/love	Kontan	Content (happy)	Aimer	Mo kontan twa	I love/like you
To be able to	Kapav/Ka/Kav	Capabilité (capability)	Pouvoir	Zot pa kapav marse	They can't walk
To see/find	Trouv(e)	Trouver (to find)	Voir	Ki to trouve ladan?	What do you see inside of it?
To look/watch/see	Get(e)	Guetter (to watch carefully)	Regarder/Voir	Mo pe get televizion	I'm watching TV
To fight/argue	Lager	La guerre (the war)	Se disputer/Se battre	Zot pou kontign lager la?	Are you still gonna keep on fighting?
To steal	Kokin	Coquin (naughty/rascal)	Voler	Li'nn kokin mo portab!	He stole my phone!

English	Mauritian Creole	Original French Word	French	Example Sentence	Example Sentence in English
Person	Dimounn	De monde (people, used in phrases)	Personne	Enn dimounn pe asiz lor sa stati-la	A person is sitting on that statue
Tree	Pie	Pied (foot)	Arbre	Sa pie-la pou tonb lor lakaz-la	This tree is going to fall on the house
Insect	Bebet	Bébête (Childish french for bug/ fool/idiot)	Insecte	Ena enn ta bebet pe mars-marse isi	There are a bunch of insects walking around here
Shoes	Soulye	Soulier (shoes with rigid soles)	Chaussure	To bizin souy sa labou-la depi to soulye!	You need to clean the mud off your shoes!
Overcoat/Jacket	Palto	Paletot (overcoat/jacket)	Veste/Manteau	Met to palto avan ki fer fre!	Put on your jacket before it gets cold!
Gossip	Palab	Palabre (palaver)	Potins	To kontan koz palab twa...	You love to gossip...

=== English vocabulary ===
Some vocabulary from the English language has also been incorporated into Mauritian Creole as well.

English	Mauritian Creole	Original French Word	Example Sentence	Example Sentence in French
To check	Chek(e)	Verifier/Valider	Chek si to kard ankor ar twa	Check if your card is still with you
Bus stop	Bistop	Arrêt de bus	Mo pa kone kot bistop ete	I don't know where the bus stop is
Challenge	Chalenj	Défi	Sa ti enn gro chalenj pou mwa	This was a big challenge for me
Jacket	Jaket	Veste	Kot li'nn aste so jaket?	Where did he buy his jacket from?

== Lexicon ==
Most words come from French but are not always used in the same way. For example, the French article le, la, les is often fused with the noun in Mauritian: French rat is Mauritian lera and French temps is Mauritian letan. The same is true for some adjectives and prepositions: French femme ("woman") and riz ("rice") are bonnfam (from bonne femme) and diri (from du riz) in Mauritian. Some words have changed their meanings: Mauritian gagn ("to get, obtain") is derived from French gagner ("to win, earn").

Other words come from either Portuguese or Spanish. The word ziromon meaning pumpkin is from Portuguese jerimum, originally from Tupi jirumun. The word lakaz meaning house is originally from Portuguese casa.

There are also several loanwords from the languages of the African Malagasy slaves, who contributed such words as Mauritian lapang from Malagasy ampango (rice stuck to the bottom of a pot), Mauritian lafus from Malagasy hafotsa (a kind of tree), and Mauritian zahtak from Malagasy antaka (a kind of plant). In some cases, as with some of the nouns from French, the Mauritian word has fused with the French article le/la/les.

Words of East African origin include Mauritian makutu from Makua makhwatta (running sore), Mauritian matak from Swahili, and Makonde matako (buttock).

Recent loanwords tend to come from English, such as map instead of plan or carte in French (plan or kart in Mauritian Creole). English words used in Mauritian Creole retain their English spelling but should normally be written with inverted commas.

Only two common Mauritian Creole words derive from Chinese: minn (from Yue Chinese: 麵, romanized: mihn), meaning "noodle", and malang, meaning "dirty" or "poor".

== Grammar ==
Nouns do not change in accordance with grammatical number. Whether a noun is singular or plural can usually be determined only by context. However, the particle bann (from bande) is often placed before a word to indicate that it is plural. French un/une corresponds to Mauritian enn but its use has slightly different rules. Mauritian has an article (la), but it is placed after the noun. Compare French un rat, ce rat, le rat, les rats, and Mauritian enn lera, lera-la and bann lera.

In Mauritian, there is only one form for each plural pronoun and the third-person singular pronoun, regardless of case or gender; li can thus be translated as "he, she, it, him, his, her, hers" depending on the context.

Verbs do not change their form according to tense or person. Instead, the accompanying noun or pronoun determines who is engaging in the action, and several preverbal particles are used alone or in combination to indicate the tense: ti (from French étais) marks past tense, pe, short for the now-rare ape (from "après", as Québec French) still uses to mark the progressive aspect, (f)inn (from French fini) marks the completive or perfect, and pou or sometimes va or ava (from French va, rarely used however) marks the future tense.

For example, li finn gagn ("he/she/it got/had") can also be shortened to li'nn gagn and pronounced as one word. The Réunion version is li té fine gagne for past, li té i gagne for past progressive, and li sava gagne for present progressive or near future.

Verbs do change their form if there is an object in the sentence. Verbs that end in "e" drop the "e" when there is an object.

For example, the base verb "to eat" in Mauritian Creole is manze. To say, "I am eating", you say mo pe manze, but when an object is added, the "e" is lost. For example, to say "I am eating bread", you say mo pe manz dipin.

Even if it is an indirect object, the "e" is lost. For example, to say "I am going to a shop", (the base verb is ale) you say mo pe al enn magazin.

To negate a sentence, the marker "pa" (which comes from the word "pas" in French) is used, like in the sentence li pa manz dipin (he/she/it doesn't eat bread).

Creole Markers	Tense/Aspect	Example sentence	Meaning
pe (après)	Present progressive	Dasa pe manze	Dasa is eating
ti (était)	Past simple	Dasa ti manze	Dasa ate
finn/fini/inn/'nn (finir)	Present perfect	Dasa finn/inn manze	Dasa has eaten
fek	Past recent	Dasa fek manze	Dasa has just eaten
pou (pour)	Future simple	Dasa pou manze	Dasa will eat
pou finn/fini	Future perfect	Das pou finn manze	Dasa will have eaten
ava (va)	Indefinite future	Dasa ava manze	Dasa will eat
ti pe/ape	Past progressive	Dasa ti pe/ape manze	Dasa was eating
ti pou	Past future/Conditional	Dasa ti pou manze	Dasa was going to/would eat
ti finn/fini	Past perfect	Dasa ti finn manze	Dasa had eaten
ti pou finn/fini	Conditional past	Dasa ti pou finn manze	Dasa would have eaten

The causative voice is marked by the word fer (do) whilst the reflexive voice is marked with either the express lack of a marking, or the words li, and limem.

For example, the sentence "the bread is eaten by him", you say, dipin-la finn manze par li (which, when translated literally, is the bread eaten by him).

== Sample ==
Here is the Lord's Prayer in Mauritian Creole, French and English:

Mauritian Creole

Nou Papa ki dan lesiel
Fer rekonet ki to nom sain,
Fer ki to regn vini,
Fer to volonte akonpli,
Lor later kouma dan lesiel.
Donn nou azordi dipin ki nou bizin.
Pardonn nou, nou bann ofans,
Kouma nou osi pardonn lezot ki finn ofans nou.
Pa les nou tomb dan tantasion
Me tir nou depi lemal.

Gallicized orthography

Nous Papa qui dans le-ciel,
Faire reconnaitte que to nom saint,
Faire que to règne vini,
Faire to volonté accompli
L'haur la-terre coumma dans le-ciel.
Donne-nous ajord'hui du-pain que nous bisein.
Pardonne-nous nous banne offense,
Coumma nous aussi pardonne les-auttes qui fine offense nous.
Pas laisse nous tombe dans tentation,
Mais tire-nous depuis le-mal.

French

Notre Père, qui est aux cieux,
Que ton Nom soit sanctifié,
Que ton règne vienne,
Que ta volonté soit faite
Sur la terre comme au ciel.
Donne-nous aujourd'hui notre pain de ce jour.
Pardonne-nous nos offenses,
Comme nous pardonnons aussi à ceux qui nous ont offensés.
Et ne nous soumets pas à la tentation,
Mais délivre-nous du mal.

English

Our Father in heaven,
hallowed be your name.
Your kingdom come,
your will be done,
on earth, as it is in heaven.
Give us this day our daily bread,
and forgive us our debts,
as we also have forgiven our debtors.
And lead us not into temptation,
but deliver us from evil.

Article 1 of the Universal Declaration of Human Rights in Mauritian Creole:

Tou imin vinn lor later lib ek egal an drwa ek an dignite. Zot ne avek fakilte rezone e avek enn konsians e zot bizin azir enn anver lot dan enn espri fraternite.

Article 1 of the Universal Declaration of Human Rights in English:

All human beings are born free and equal in dignity and rights. They are endowed with reason and conscience and should act towards one another in a spirit of brotherhood.

== See also ==
- Agalega creole
- Chagossian creole
- Creole language
- Rodriguan creole
- Seychellois Creole

== Bibliography ==
- Adone, Dany. The Acquisition of Mauritian creole. Amsterdam; Philadelphia: J. Benjamins, 1984.
- Anonymous. Diksyoner Kreol-Angle / Prototype Mauritian creole-English Dictionary. Port Louis: L.P.T., 1985.
- Baker, Philip and Chris Corne, Isle de France Creole: Affinities and Origins. Ann Arbor: Karoma, 1982.
- Baker, Philip and Vinesh Y. Hookoomsing. Morisyen-English-français : diksyoner kreol morisyen (Dictionary of Mauritian creole). Paris : Harmattan, 1987.
- Carpooran, Arnaud. Diksioner morisien [version prototip/let A–E]. Quatre Bornes, Ile Maurice : Editions Bartholdi, 2005.
- Carpooran, Arnaud. Le Créole Mauricien de poche. Chennevières-sur-Marne : Assimil, 2007. ISBN 978-2-7005-0309-8.
- Carpooran, Arnaud. Diksioner morisien[version integral/1e edision]. Sainte Croix, Ile Maurice : Koleksion Text Kreol, 2009, 1017pp.
- Carpooran, Arnaud. Diksioner morisien. [version integral/2em edision]. Vacoas, Ile Maurice : Edition Le Printempss, 2011, 1200pp.
- Chaudenson, Robert. Les créoles francais. Évreux: F. Nathan, 1979.
- Chaudenson, Robert. Creolization of language and culture; translated and revised by Salikoko S. Mufwene, with Sheri Pargman, Sabrina Billings, and Michelle AuCoin. London; New York : Routledge, 2001.
- Choy, Paul. Korek – A Beginners Guide To Mauritian Creole (Grand Baie, Mauritius: Pachworks 4th ed., 2014)
- Corne, Chris. Essai de grammaire du créole mauricien, Auckland : Linguistic Society of New Zealand, 1970.
- Corne, Chris. A contrastive analysis of Reunion and Isle de France Creole French: two typologically diverse languages. In: Isle de France Creole: affinities and origins, Philip Baker & Chris Corne, 8–129. Ann Arbor: Karoma, 1982.
- Corne, Chris. "Mauritian creole Reflexives", Journal of Pidgin and Creole Languages, Volume 3, Number 1, 1988, pp. 69–94, 1988. doi:10.1075/jpcl.3.1.03cor
- Corne, Chris. From French to Creole, Battlebridge Publications (Westminster Creolistics), 1999.
- Frew, Mark. Mauritian creole in seven easy lessons. 2nd ed. Port Louis, Republic of Mauritius : Ledikasyon pu Travayer, 2003.
- Holm, John. Pidgins and Creoles, Volume II: Reference Survey. Cambridge: Cambridge University Press, 1989.
- Lee, Jacques K. Mauritius : its Creole language : the ultimate Creole phrase book : English-Creole dictionary. London: Nautilus Pub. Co., 1999.

. Papen, Robert A. The French-based Creoles of the Indian Ocean: An Analysis and Comparison. Unpublished PhD thesis. University of California, San Diego. 1978.

- Strandquist, Rachel Eva. Article Incorporation in Mauritian creole. M.A. thesis, University of Victoria, 2005. hdl:1828/820
- Wittmann, Henri. Les parlers créoles des Mascareignes: une orientation. Trois-Rivières: Travaux linguistiques de l'Université du Québec à Trois-Rivières 1, 1972.
- Wittmann, Henri. « Lexical diffusion and the glottogenetics of creole French. » CreoList debate, parts I–VI, appendixes 1–9. The Linguist List, Eastern Michigan University & Wayne State University. 2001.
- Wittmann, Henri & Robert Fournier. "L'agglutination nominale en français colonial." Revue québécoise de linguistique théorique et appliquée 2:2.185–209, 1981.
- Wittmann, Henri & Robert Fournier. "Interprétation diachronique de la morphologie verbale du créole réunionnais". Revue québécoise de linguistique théorique et appliquée 6:2.137–50, 1987; in response to the hypothesis put forward by Corne (1982) in Baker and Corne (1982).
