= List of Mauritian writers =

This is a list of writers & authors from Mauritius who write in French, English or Hindi languages:

- Nathacha Appanah (1973– ), Francophone writer
- Rajendra Arun (1945–2021), Hindi writer
- Azize Asgarally (1933– ), Francophone, Anglophone and Creolophone writer, playwright and activist
- Issa Asgarally GCSK (1949- ), Francophone writer
- Richard Sedley Assonne (1961– ), Creolophone and francophone writer
- Eric Bahloo (1964- ), Francophone writer
- Lilian Berthelot (1933-2012), Francophone writer
- Somdath Bhuckory (1921-1980), Francophone, Anglophone and Indophone writer. Lawyer and Town Clerk of Port Louis.
- Mohunlall Brijmohun (19– ), Indophone writer
- Marcel Cabon (1912–1972), Francophone novelist
- Aslakha Callikan-Proag (1955-2020), Francophone writer
- Sabah Carrim (19– ), Anglophone writer
- Malcolm de Chazal (1902-1981), writer
- Raymond Chasle (1930–1996), Francophone diplomat and poet
- Lindsey Collen (1948– ), Creolophone and anglophone novelist and essayist
- Ananda Devi (1957– ), Francophone writer
- Monique Dinan (1939- ), Francophone writer and journalist
- Christine Duverge (1969– ), Francophone writer
- Ashvin Dwarka (1977- ), Francophone writer and lawyer
- Bernard d'Espaignet, Francophone writer
- Jacques Edouard (1964– ), Francophone journalist, poet and writer
- Jean Fanchette (1932–1992), Francophone poet and psychoanalyst
- Alain Gordon Gentil, Francophone writer and journalist
- Yacoob Ghanty (1940- ), Anglophone writer
- Robert-Edward Hart (1891–1954), Franco-Mauritian poet and novelist
- Shakuntala Hawoldar (1937–2018), Anglophone writer
- Sudhir Hazareesingh (1961- ), Anglophone and Francophone writer
- Evenor Hitié (1806-1901), Francophone writer
- Marie-Thérèse Humbert (1940– ) Francophone novelist
- Davina Itoo (1983– ), Francophone novelist
- Yusuf Kadel (1970– ), Francophone poet and playwright
- Stefan Hart de Keating (1971– ), Francophone slam poet
- Raymonde de Kervern (1899–1973), Franco-Mauritian poet
- Marcelle Lagesse (1916-2011), Francophone writer and journalist
- Léoville L'Homme (1857–1928), Francophone poet
- Magda Mamet (1916–2012), Francophone poet
- Jagadish Manrakhan (1938-2013), Anglophone writer and academic
- Edouard Maunick (1931– ), Francophone poet, writer, and diplomat^{[Gikandi]}^{[Jahn]}^{[Killam & Rowe]}
- Savinien Mérédac (Auguste Esnouf)(1880-1939), Francophone writer and engineer
- Alex Camille Moutou, Anglophone and Francophone writer and historian
- Anand Mulloo (1936- ), Anglophone writer and teacher
- Amédée Nagapen, Francophone writer and priest
- Jean-René Noyau (1911–1986 ), Surrealist francophone poet
- Shenaz Patel (1966– ), Francophone and Creole story writer, playwright and novelist
- Cassandra (Sandrine) Piat (1973– ), anglophone writer
- Ponsamy Poongavanon, francophone author
- Eugénie Poujade (1814-1881), poet and writer
- Jean-Georges Prosper (1933– ), francophone poet and author of the Mauritian national anthem
- Rivaltz Quenette (1928-2015), Anglophone and Francophone writer and historian
- Camille de Rauville (1910– ), Francophone writer
- Ramesh Ramdoyal (197–), anglophone writer and academic
- Pahlad Ramsurrun, Anglophone and Indophone writer and poet
- Karamchand Goswami Sewtohul, Anglophone, Francophone and Creole story writer
- Amal Sewtohul (1971–), Francophone writer and diplomat
- Natasha Soobramanien (197– ), anglophone writer
- Pierre De Sornay (1876-1968), francophone writer and agronomist
- Vijaya Teelock, Anglophone writer and historian
- Auguste Toussaint (1911-1987), francophone writer and archivist
- Abhimanyu Unnuth (1937–2018), Indophone writer, poet and essayist
- Khal Torabully (1956– ), Francophone and Creolophone poet and film-maker
- Alix Marrier d'Unienville (1918-2015), Francophone and anglophone writer, war hero and former spy
- Dev Virahsawmy (1942– ), Creolophone poet, novelist and essayist
- Hassam Wachill (1939– ), Francophone poet

== See also ==
- List of African writers by country
- Mauritian literature
- List of poets
- List of African poets
