= Mauritian literature =

The island of Mauritius is home to many languages, and Mauritian literature exists in French, English, Creole and Indian languages. Major themes in Mauritian literature include exoticism, multiracialism and miscegenation, racial and social conflicts, indianocéanisme, and—more recently—post-modernism and post-structuralism currents, such as coolitude.

After independence in 1968 writers like Dev Virahsawmy reactivated creole language, then considered as a "patois," and wrote literature, especially drama. The new generation of writers has expressed persistent concern with structure and more global themes.

While Kreol Morisyen is the most spoken language on in Mauritius, most of the literature is written in French, although many authors write in English, Bhojpuri, and Morisyen. Mauritius's renowned playwright Dev Virahsawmy writes exclusively in Morisyen.

Important authors include Malcolm de Chazal, Ananda Devi, Raymond Chasle, and Edouard Maunick. Lindsey Collen has been able to carve out a meeting of imaginaries in the unique social setup of this multi-faceted country. Other younger writers like Shenaz Patel, Natacha Appanah, Alain Gordon-Gentil and Carl de Souza explore the issues of ethnicity, superstition and politics in the novel. Poet and critic Khal Torabully has put forward the concept of "coolitude," a poetics that results from the blend of Indian and Mauritian cultural diversity. Other poets include Hassam Wachill, Edouard Maunick, Sedley Assone, Yusuf Kadel and Umar Timol.

J. M. G. Le Clézio, who won the Nobel Prize for Literature in 2008, is of Mauritian heritage and holds dual French-Mauritian citizenship.

The island plays host to the Le Prince Maurice Prize, a literary award celebrating and recognizing 'writers of the heart'. The award is designed to highlight the literary love story in all its forms rather than for pure Romantic Fiction. In keeping with the island's literary culture the prize alternates on a yearly basis between English-speaking and French-speaking writers.

== Notable writers ==
=== French language ===
- Malcolm de Chazal
- Ananda Devi
- Nathacha Appanah
- Aqiil Gopee
- Marie-Thérèse Humbert
- Marie-Aimée de Kermorvan
- Clément Charoux
- Rita Nathalie Charoux

Mauritian writer and poet (1904-1985)

- Marie Leblanc
- J. M. G. Le Clézio
- Shenaz Patel
- Eugénie Poujade
- Amal Sewtohul
- Khal Torabully
- Clément Charoux
- Rita Nathalie Charroux

=== English language ===
- Priya Hein
- Vinod Busjeet
- Lindsey Collen
- Natasha Soobramanien
- Ariel Saramandi
- Rita Nathalie Charoux
- Pahlad Ramsurrun

=== Hindi language ===
- Pahlad Ramsurrun
- Abhimanyu Unnuth
- Rajendra Arun
- Sita Ramyad
- Raj Heeramun
- Mukesh Jeebodh

=== Creole ===
- Azize Asgarally
- Dev Virahsawmy

== Works ==
- Tales from Mauritius (1979)

== See also ==
- Culture of Mauritius
- Indian Ocean literature
- List of Mauritian writers
