= Indian Ocean literature =

The Indian Ocean is home to many literary texts, from Greco-Roman times to One Thousand and One Nights. It is the matrix of many narratives, for instance the narrative which portrays Sinbad the Merchant through a fantastic story, and which is based on real details of navigation in this ocean where globalisation happened early. Combining Indian and Chinese literatures, among the oldest on the planet, this is an highly fictionalized ocean, being the backbone of many tales, novels and poetic work.

This was further enhanced when Bartholomew Diaz rounded the Cape of Good Hope in 1488, paving the way for Vasco da Gama, who reached Malindi, before being guided to Calicut, the desired port of spices, by a mualim or regional pilot. The Portuguese poet Camoens then wrote his famous Lusiads.

Mark Twain sojourned there. So did Bernardin de Saint Pierre, who invented the naturalist novel with Paul et Virginie, an idyllic and tragic novel under the tropics, in Mauritius. Charles Baudelaire also carried his spleen there, experimenting the correspondences and falling in love with Creole and Indian ladies, as expressed in his poems "La dame créole" and "A une malabaraise". In Réunion, Rouget Leconte de Lisle is foremost, with symbolist poetry.

Many more poets went to the Mascarene islands, like Paul-Jean Toulet.

== Colonial era ==
In the colonial era, writers like Rabemananjara and Rabearivelo took French to new horizons, combining their original languages and cultures with the colonists' idiom. In Réunion, Marius and Ary Leblond developed the colonial novel, and in Mauritius, Clément Charoux and Léoville L'Homme expressed the contradictions of cultures and colours in a colonial environment.

Preceding the independence period, Mauritian writers like Marcel Cabon, Jean-Georges Prosper, Edouard Maunick, Robert Edward-Hart, René Noyau and Emmanuel Juste espoused négritude or more Mauritian themes.

== Postcolonial era ==
In the 1970s, more "sociological" writers such Marie-Thérèse Humbert expressed the duality of multiculturalism.

Recent Mauritian writers include Ananda Devi, Natacha Appanah, Carl de Souza, Shenaz Patel, Barlen Pyamootoo and Khal Torabully.

== See also ==
- Indian literature
- Chinese literature
- Malagasy literature
- Mauritian literature
