= Indradhanush (disambiguation) =

Indradhanush is an Indian children's television series.

Indradhanush (lit. 'Indra's bow', transl. rainbow) may also refer to:

- Indradhanush (air force exercise), by the Royal Air Force and the Indian Air Force
- Indradhanush (film), a 2000 Indian Kannada-language action drama
- Indradhanush (Indian magazine), a monthly Indian children's magazine
- Indradhanush (Mauritian magazine), a trilingual literary magazine
- Mission Indradhanush, a vaccination programme
