= Poujade =

Poujade is a French surname. Notable people with the surname include:

- Éric Poujade (1972–2024), French gymnast
- Eugénie Poujade (1814–1881), Mauritian novelist, poet and editor
- Gustave Arthur Poujade (1845–1909), French entomologist
- Joseph Poujade (1852–1930), American politician
- Pierre Poujade (1920–2003), French politician
- Robert Poujade (1928–2020), French politician
