= Azor Adelaide =

Political activist

Personal details
- Born: 15 February 1922 Beau-Bassin, Mauritius
- Died: 25 November 1971 (aged 49) Curepipe, Mauritius
- Cause of death: Assassination by gunshot
- Party: Mouvement Militant Mauricien
- Occupation: Activist

Azor Adélaïde (15 February 1922 – 25 November 1971), also known as Azor Adelaide, was a Mauritian Creole political activist. He was shot and killed along Chasteauneuf Road in the town of Curepipe, Mauritius on 25 November 1971. Although witnesses have provided detailed accounts of the murder it remains unsolved.

== Death ==
Activists of the newly-formed MMM were preparing to put up posters advertising for a public meeting to be held 2 days later on 27 November 1971 at Cité Atlee. At 15:30 gangsters travelling in a Ford Falcon sedan (registration number V643) shot at an MMM activist's Hillman car (registration number B614) as they travelled along Rue Chasteauneuf near the round-about intersecting with Royal Road, Curepipe. MP Dev Virahsawmy was a passenger on the rear seat of Hillman B614, as it was being driven by an activist of the MMM. Retired docker and MMM activist Azor Adélaïde, who was also on the rear seat of the Hillman B614, was fatally struck by a bullet. Minutes earlier Paul Bérenger had been shot at 3 times by the same gunmen in front of the Hotel de Ville or municipality of Curepipe, but Bérenger managed to escape and hide behind bamboo bushes nearby. Bérenger's Peugeot 404 (registration number N193) had stopped in front of the municipality of Curepipe and its passengers Yves Raboude, Désiré Carré, Saïd Mungroo and A. Cotobally were about to seek the municipality's approval stamps for the MMM posters. Soon after the MMM activists sought shelter, Bérenger's Peugeot 404 N193 was set alight by the same 4 thugs who travelled in the Ford Falcon V643.

=== Trial ===
In 1989 two ex-prisoners Paul Sarah and Moorgesh Shummoogum alleged in a statement to the police that in 1971 Sir Gaetan Duval had planned and commandeered the murder of Azor Adelaide at his Grand-Gaube bungalow. They made the police statement at the police station located outside then Prime Minister Sir Aneerood Jugnauth's residence at La Caverne, Vacoas. Paul Sarah, Moorgesh Shummoogum, Ignace Bahloo and André Celestin had already served prison sentences for their involvement in the 1971 murder.

During the afternoon of 23 June 1989 Duval landed at Plaisance Airport in Mauritius from Madagascar and he was questioned by Superintendent of Police Reesaul of the Anti Drug and Smuggling Unit (ADSU). Assistant Commissioner of Police (ACP) Cyril Morvan was also travelling on the same flight.

Duval was escorted to Line Barracks in Port Louis where he was arrested on murder charges. He was questioned in the presence of his lawyer Kader Bhayat before being detained at the barracks of Special Mobile Force in Vacoas. The arrest led to various protests by Gaetan Duval's supporters which sometimes turned violent. They protested against the dictatorial behaviour of then PM Sir Aneerood Jugnauth. However after a lengthy trial Duval was acquitted of all murder charges.

== Bibliography ==
The murder of Azor Adelaide is a central theme of the 2011 book L'affaire Azor Adélaide: le plus célèbre crime politique à Maurice which was written by Mauritian author Eric Bahloo.

Earlier in 2004 Jacques Panglose published a book Le procès du Roi which details the judicial battle of politician and lawyer Sir Gaetan Duval who was accused in 1989 by his former bodyguards of plotting and ordering the murder of Azor Adelaide.

In 2017 author Loga Virahsawmy published her book The Lotus Flower, a conversation with Dev Virahsawmy which provides an account of key witness Dev Virahsawmy.
