= Renée Asgarally =

Mauritian author and poet (1939–2010)

- Born: Renée Lilianne Juddoo; 8 July 1939; Rose Hill, British Mauritius
- Died: 6 July 2010 (aged 70); Mauritius
- Occupation: Author
- Spouse: Azize Asgarally
- Writing career
- Language: Mauritian Creole, French
- Notable works: Quand montagne prend difé... (1977); Tension gagne corne (1979); Les filles de Madame Laljee (1981)

Renée Asgarally (8 July 1939 – 6 July 2010) was a Mauritian author and poet. She was a key player in the post-colonial literature revival in Mauritius, after the country gained independence from Great Britain. She published works in Mauritian Creole (Morisyen), French, and English, becoming the first Mauritian female author – and one of the first authors overall – to publish literature in Creole. Her books primarily focused on themes of racism and prejudice in Mauritian society and their impact on relationships.

== Personal life ==
Asgarally was born Renée Lilianne Juddoo to a lower middle class Creole Métis family in 1939 British Mauritius. Her mother was a school principal and inspector.

Asgarally married playwright, teacher, and future Mauritian parliament member Azize Asgarally.

== Career ==
Asgarally published her debut novel Quand montagne prend difé in 1977, nine years after Mauritian independence. Quand montagne prend difé was the first book by a female author to be written and published in Mauritian Creole. While Mauritian Creole was commonly spoken, even post-independence, there was a remaining stigma around the language and prioritization of French and English languages. The book focused on themes of racial and religious prejudice in Mauritian society, describing the tragic and secretive interfaith and interracial relationship of characters Soonil and Caroline in the late 20th century.

Nous na pas énan droit pou nou vive... Trop boucoup quitte chose ti barré. Couleur, l'arzent, nation. Zamais zotte na pas ti pou réussi... Enan de fois, quand la lune claire, dimoune marché asoir. Zotte prend l'air. Zotte dire, quand zotte passe enbas la rivière, zotte trouve ène garcon are ène tifi pé assisé lor roche.

— Renée Asgarally, Quand Montagne prend difé...

A preface for Quand Montagne prend difé was later written by Issa Asgarally, who called the book a "revalorization of the national language of Mauritius." The book was translated into french under the title La Brulure in 1993.

In 1979, Asgarally wrote a second book in Mauritian Creole, Tension gagne corne. The book was a collection of short stories: "Névaine Madame Zozef – Ene vagabond," "Missié sacristin," "Zistoire ène ti la sirène," and "Madame Gab."

She a semi-autobiographical series Les filles de Madame Laljee (1981) and its sequel Tant que soufflera le vent (1983) in the French language. According to Île en île, the books "décrivent avec lucidité et courage comment la société mauricienne vit dans des systèmes étanches frisant un apartheid de fait qui en affecte l'évolution harmonieuse. [transl. describe with lucidity and courage how Mauritian society lives in watertight systems curing de facto apartheid that affects its harmonious evolution.]"

=== Bibliography ===
==== Books in Mauritian Creole ====
- Asgarally, Renée (1977). Quand montagne prend difé... [When mountain takes on defy...] (in Morisyen). Rose-Hill, Mauritius: Mascarena University Publications. pp. 1–102. LCCN 79982389. OL 4091714M.
- Asgarally, Renée (1979). Tension gagne corne (in Morisyen). Rose-Hill, Mauritius: Mascarena University Publications. pp. 1–112. LCCN 81980254. OCLC 6821874. OL 3936407M.

==== Books in French ====
- Asgarally, Renée (1981). Les filles de Madame Laljee (in French). Port-Louis, Mauritius: Swallow Printing. pp. 1–247. LCCN 86868158. OL 2350560M.
- Asgarally, Renée (1984). Tant que soufflera le vent [As long as the wind blows] (in French). Rose-Hill, Mauritius. pp. 1–209. LCCN 85980000. OL 2706505M.
- Asgarally, Renée (1983). Les trois tortues, Le petit prisonnier: Contes en français pour enfants [The Three Turtles, The Little Prisoners: Tales in French for children] (in French).
- Asgarally, Renée (1988). Le bouquet, poèmes et comptines [The bouquet, poems and rhymes] (in French and English).
- Asgarally, Renée (1993). La Brûlure (Translated edition of Quand montagne prend difé...) (in French). Port Louis, Mauritius: Impr. Ledikasyon pu travayer. pp. 1–173. ISBN 9789990333022. LCCN 93849605. OCLC 34640225. OL 1055368M.
