= Indradhanush (Mauritian magazine) =

- Editor-in-chief: Pahlad Ramsurrun
- Categories: Literary, cultural
- Frequency: Quarterly
- Publisher: Indradhanush Sanskritic Parishad
- Founded: October 1988
- First issue: December 1988
- Country: Mauritius
- Language: Hindi, English, French

Indradhanush (Hindi: इंद्रधनुष, meaning Rainbow) is a trilingual, literary, quarterly magazine published in Mauritius. Established in 1988 by the Indradhanush Sanskritic Parishad (The Rainbow Cultural Circle), the magazine has been an important platform for literature, history, cultural studies, and multicultural awareness, appearing in Hindi, English, and French.

== History ==
The Indradhanush Sanskritic Parishad, a cultural movement, was founded in October 1988 at Beau Bassin, Mauritius, through the initiative of Pahlad Ramsurrun and a few of his collaborators. That same year in the month of December, the Parishad began publishing Indradhanush as a quarterly magazine exclusively in Hindi.

Each quarterly issue of the magazine carries an article on a prominent personality of the country as a celebration of their good works and contributions for the betterment of the Mauritian society. Such a prominent personality can also be from a foreign country so long they have had some form of politico-socio-cultural influence in one way or the other, directly or indirectly, on the Mauritian society.

From 2000 onwards, Indradhanush became a trilingual publication, adding English and French alongside Hindi. This broadened its reach to a wider readership in Mauritius and among the Mauritian diaspora.

== Content and Editorial Focus ==
Indradhanush publishes a wide range of material including:

- Literature – poetry, short stories, critical essays.
- Folklore and cultural studies – articles on Mauritian heritage and Indo-Mauritian traditions.
- History and biographies – special issues devoted to national figures and cultural leaders.

The magazine emphasizes multilingualism and cultural exchange, aiming to bridge literary traditions across the three languages.

== Special Issues ==
Over the years, Indradhanush has produced thematic issues dedicated to prominent figures in Mauritian and Indian history, including:

- Manilal Doctor, an Indian barrister and political activist in Mauritius.
- Sir Seewoosagur Ramgoolam – The “Father of the Nation” of Mauritius.
- Aunauth Beejadhur, a writer, journalist and politician, and first Governor of the Bank of Mauritius .
- Robert Edward Hart, a prominent Mauritian poet, author, and cultural figure.
- Mohandas Karamchand Gandhi, an Indian lawyer, activist and politician.
- Léoville L'Homme, a Mauritian poet, literary critic, journalist, newspaper editor, and librarian.
- Pundit Atmaram Vishwanath, a newspaper editor, writer, and political activist in Mauritius.
- Pandit Kashinath Kistoe, a prominent Mauritian Hindu priest and social activist, and educator.
- Sri Aurobindo, an Indian philosopher, poet, nationalist, and yogi.

== Contributors ==
The magazine has featured work by Mauritian poets, writers, and academics, as well as contributions from international scholars. It serves as a platform for writers across linguistic communities in Mauritius.

== Reception and Impact ==
Indradhanush is regarded as one of the most significant Hindi and trilingual literary publications in Mauritius. It is referenced in discussions of Hindi journalism in Mauritius, included in the National Bibliography of Mauritius, and preserved in university and research libraries abroad, such as New York University’s SALTOC archives.

== Editorial Team ==
The Chief Editor of Indradhanush is Pahlad Ramsurrun, a Mauritian writer and academic, assisted by Yvan Martial and Sangeeta Ramsurrun-Nunkoo as Associate Editors.

The magazine is published under the aegis of the Indradhanush Sanskritic Parishad (The rainbow Cultural Circle), Beau-Bassin, Mauritius.

== See also ==
- Mauritian literature
- List of Mauritian writers
- List of magazines in Mauritius
- Pahlad Ramsurrun
