= Magda Mamet =

Mauritian poet (1916–2012)

- Born: 1916 Beau Bassin-Rose Hill
- Died: late January 2012 Beau Bassin-Rose Hill
- Genre: Vers libre

Magda Mamet (1916 – late January 2012) was a Mauritian-born poet.

== Biography ==
Magda Mamet was born in 1916 in Beau Bassin-Rose Hill to a Franco-Mauritian family, she was the daughter of Evenor Mamet, himself a poet. After studying at Sorbonne University, she returned to Mauritius and became a literary critic in a newspaper on the island, Le Cernéen. She then began to publish collections of poetry. Her first poems were published in Mauritian literary journal L'Essor. She was one of the first female writers on the island, even though she was preceded in the interwar period by another poet, Raymonde de Kervern.

Her poetry is characterised by social themes, such as injustice and hypocrisy, likely due to her attachment to Catholicism and, in turn, by the use of vers libre.
