= Marie Leblanc =

Mauritian writer (1867–1915

- Born: 1867
- Died: 14 August 1915 (aged 47–48); Port Louis, British Mauritius
- Occupation: Writer

Marie Leblanc (1867 – 14 August 1915) was a Mauritian writer, best known for her work as an editor of literary journals and other periodicals, as a novelist, and as a translator.

== Early life ==
Marie Leblanc was born in 1867, during a period when Mauritius was a British colony.

Much of her life is a mystery to historians, though they were able to determine that she never married. It is not clear whether she belonged to the White or the mixed "Gens de couleur" population, of French or other European origin, forming at the time the elite of the island. This is in part because no photographs of her have been found to date. She had a sister, Julia, who was disabled and died in 1918, and possibly a brother, Eugène Gabriel, who died in 1879 at age 32.

== Career ==
=== Writer ===
With the publication of her book La Vie et le Rêve en 1890, Leblanc became the first woman to publish a short story collection on the island of Mauritius.

Her short stories and novellas feature women in a European setting, presumably in France or England. They tend to center around sentimental and moralistic plots, certainly targeting an audience made up mostly of women from the island's white community. But she is considered by various scholars to have expressed fairly feminist positions considering the period and country in which she was writing.

In addition to her works of fiction, Leblanc published six biographies of contemporary Mauritian figures as well as a monograph about the 1892 Mauritius cyclone.

=== Editor and translator ===
In 1890, Leblanc founded the literary magazine La Semaine littéraire de l’île Maurice, but its publication was interrupted by the 1892 cyclone. Over the following years, she founded over a dozen periodicals and seasonal publications, including Le Soleil de juillet, which published every 14 July (Bastille Day) from 1891 to 1915; La Nouvelle Revue historique et littéraire, a weekly review that was published from 1897 to 1904; Les Roses de Noël, published every year on Christmas from 1892 to 1914; and Port-Louis mondain, a seasonal publication covering operas and operettas that ran from 1897 to 1908.

These publications, which were written in French during the island's British colonial period, allowed Leblanc to promote French literature while integrating the Mauritian elite into the British cultural landscape.

To further establish ties between Anglophone and Francophone culture in Mauritius, she translated two novels and several short stories from English into French. She also edited several single-issue bilingual French-English publications, including Victoria Review, honoring Queen Victoria, in 1897; Le Couronnement in 1902 and 1911, to celebrate the accession to the throne of Edward VII of England and then George V; and L'Entente cordiale in 1803. The magazines Rex Imperator and The Empire Day also focused on England.

Her presence in the island's literary circles was highly influential; the researcher Robert Furlong described her as playing an essential role in the development of Mauritian literature. She worked with some of the best-known authors in the country including Charles Baissac, Léoville L'Homme, Alphonse Gaud, Raoul Ollivry, and Savinien Mérédac. Through her many publications, she also enabled several other women to become published authors.

== Death and legacy ==
On 13 August 1915, Marie Leblanc was getting ready to eat at her apartment on Vieux Conseil Street in Port Louis when her kerosene stove exploded, setting the room on fire. Gravely injured, the writer was transported to the civilian hospital, where she died of her burns overnight.

In 2012, the mayor of Port Louis had a commemorative plaque installed in her honor at the Photographic Museum, which now occupies the building where Leblanc had lived.

== Bibliography ==
- Danielle Tranquille, Vicram Ramharai, Robert Furlong, Une Mauricienne d'exception: Marie Leblanc, Editions Les Mascareignes, 2005, 237 p. (ISBN 978-99903-25-29-4)
