= Indianocéanisme =

Humanist ideology from the southwest Indian Ocean region

Indianocéanisme is a humanist ideology from the southwest Indian Ocean region. The term was coined by the Mauritian Camille de Rauville during the founding conference of the International Historical Association of the Indian Ocean in 1960 in Tananarive. The ideology grows out of the observation that literature throughout the Indian Ocean is characterized by the preferential use of French along with some specific features such as the use of the myth of Lemuria and the region's Hindu heritage. Indianocéanisme was long inspired by Algerianism.

== See also ==
- Indian Ocean literature
