= Pahlad Ramsurrun =

Mauritian writer, editor and historian

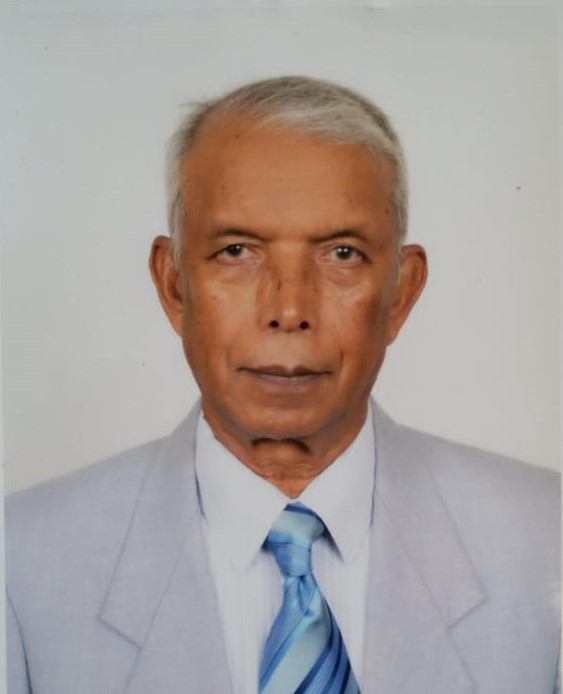
- Ramsurrun in 2025
- Born: 4 October 1937 (age 88); Bois Jacot, Amaury, British Mauritius
- Citizenship: Mauritian
- Education: Sri Venkateshwara College, University of Delhi (BA)
- Occupations: Writer, Editor, Historian, Educationist, Freelance Journalist
- Years active: 1964–present
- Known for: Mauritius Ki Lok Kathayen (Folk Tales of Mauritius); Mahatma Gandhi and his Impact on Mauritius; Indradhanush (trilingual quarterly magazine)
- Spouse(s): Ilwantee Ramsurrun, born Mungutroy (m.1967)
- Children: Sangeeta Ramsurrun-Nunkoo, Avinash Ramsurrun, Pramodh Ramsurrun
- Relatives: Madhookur Ramsurrun (brother), Bhuvesh Ramsurrun (brother)
- Awards: President's Meritorious Service Medal (P.M.S.M.) (2005); Member of the Order of the Star and Key of the Indian Ocean (M.S.K.) (2011); Pravasi Bharatiya Hindi Bushan Samman (2014); Hindi Ratna Award (2017); Lifetime Achievement Award, Ministry of Arts & Cultural Heritage (2024)
- Website: www.pahladramsurrun.com

Signature
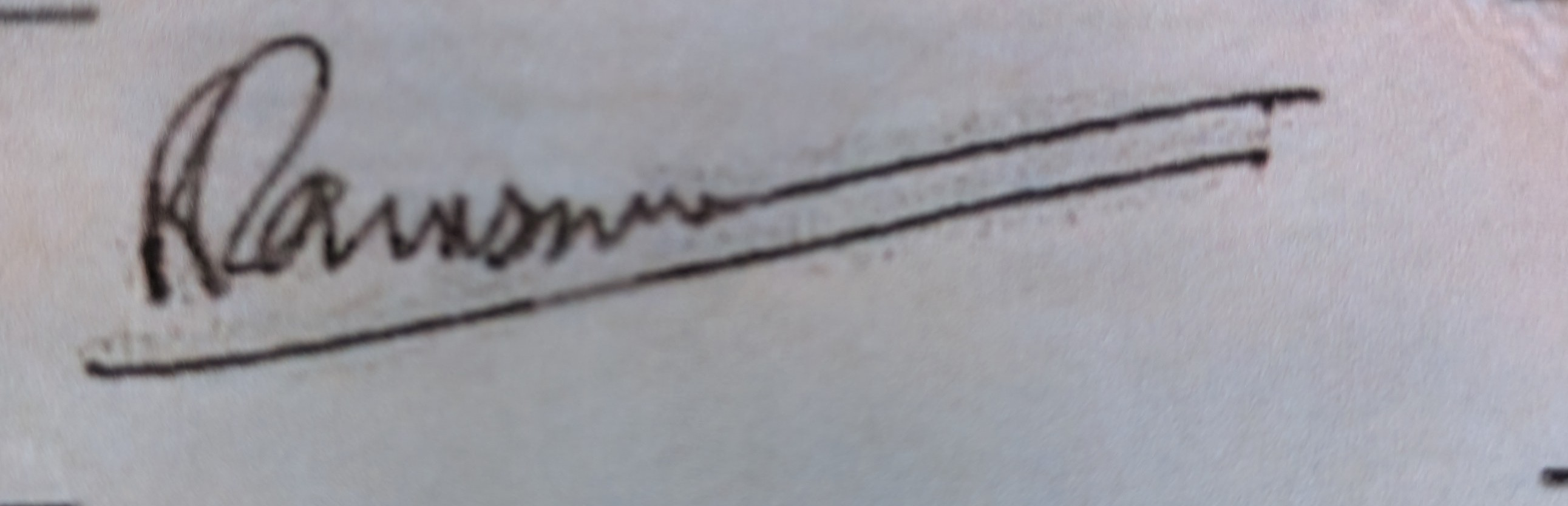

Pahlad Ramsurrun (born 4 October 1937) is a Mauritian writer. As of 2016, he had authored 70 books in Hindi, English, and French, covering subjects such as folk tales, history, culture, and Hindi literature. His works include Mauritius ki lok kathayen (Folk Tales of Mauritius), which has been translated into several languages, and Mahatma Gandhi and his Impact on Mauritius.

In addition to his writing, Ramsurrun taught Hindi at primary and secondary levels in Mauritius, eventually serving as Education Officer and Head of the Oriental Languages Department in several state colleges. He is also the chief editor of Indradhanush, a trilingual, literary, quarterly magazine published in Hindi, English, and French.

== Early life ==
Ramsurrun was born on 4 October 1937 at Bois Jacot, Amaury, in Mauritius, the second of five children of Keerodur Ramsurrun, a labourer, and Soondree Ramsurrun (née Parboteeah), a housewife. His father worked as a day labourer in the nearby sugar estates of Mon Loisir, Belle Vue Maurel and Saint Antoine, and also cultivated sugar cane and vegetables on rented land.

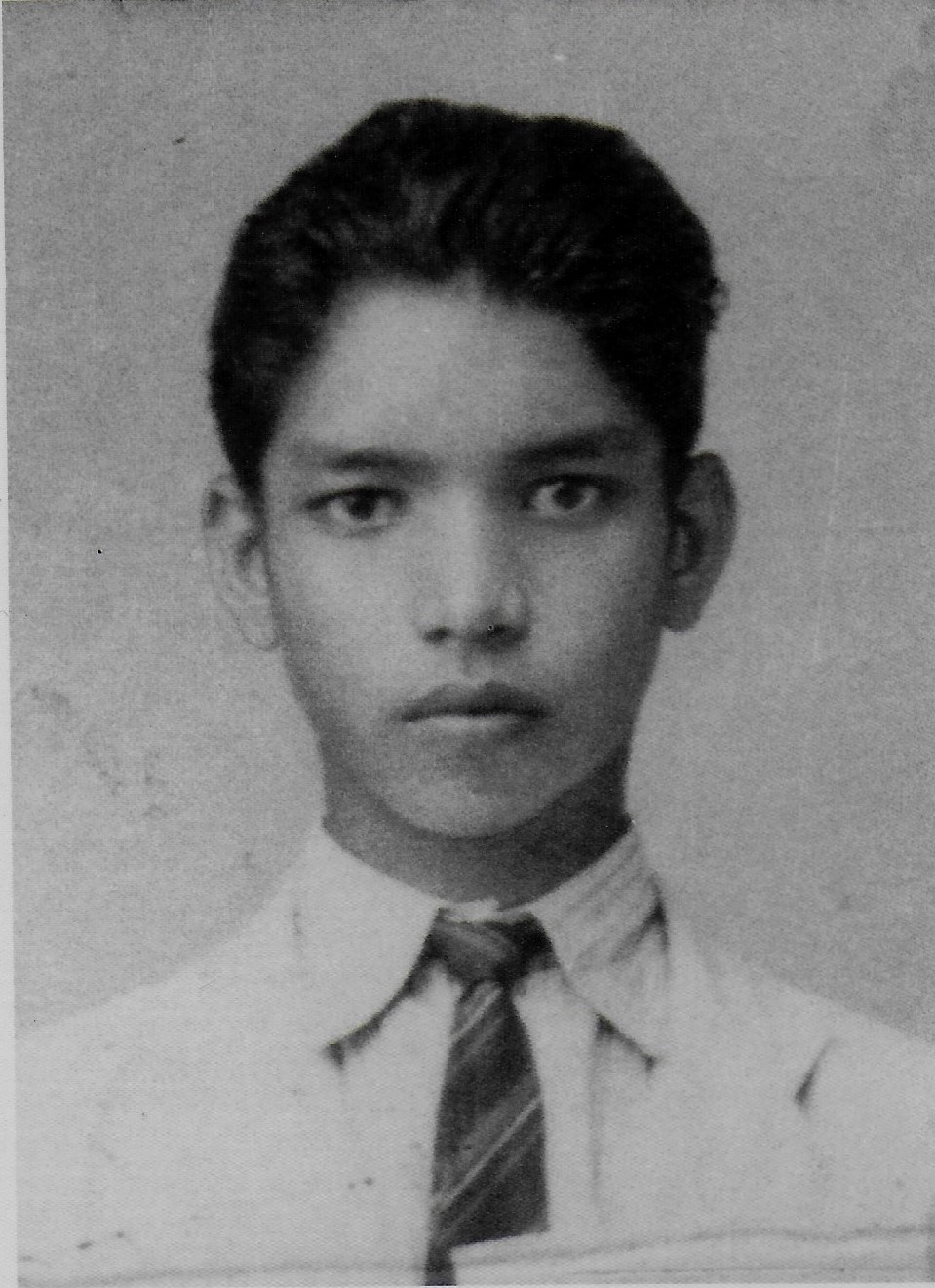
Pahlad Ramsurrun as a young boy

His mother contributed to the household by raising cattle and producing handicraft bags and baskets made from vacoas leaves (Pandanus iceryi), which were sold at the nearby market of Rivière du Rempart. Ramsurrun initially attended primary school in Laventure before transferring to Belle Vue Maurel Government School. In 1949 the family relocated to Brisée Verdière, where he completed his primary education. The family later moved to Vallée des Prêtres, near Port Louis, in 1956.

== Poverty and Hardship ==
After completing his primary education at Brisée Verdière Anglican Aided School at the age of 16, Ramsurrun intended to continue to secondary school. However, his family could not afford the monthly fees due to financial hardship. In an attempt to finance his education, Ramsurrun asked his parents to buy him a cow to sell milk or a bicycle to sell bread. These requests were declined, as the family’s resources were insufficient even for basic needs.

Following this, Ramsurrun left home without informing anyone. His family reported him missing to the Brisée Verdière police station, and the incident was noted in the daily newspaper Advance on 26 March 1954, which stated:

"Un jeune homme de 17 ans, Pahlad Ramsurrun, habitant Brisée-Verdière, a disparu depuis le 24 mars. Il portait un 'short' kaki, un veston et une chemise. Il avait à la main une tante-valise contenant du linge. Toute personne qui le verrait est priée d'en aviser la police." (A young man aged 17, Pahlad Ramsurrun, has gone missing since 24 March. He was wearing a khaki short, a vest and a shirt. He was carrying a bag containing some cloth. Anyone who sees him is advised to notify the police.)

Ramsurrun returned home after eight days, stating that he had stayed in a forested area called La Nicolière under the Zomblon bridge for peace of mind and meditation.

Ramsurrun faced both a disrupted primary education and the inability to continue to secondary school. Despite these challenges, he remained committed to learning and self-improvement. To support his family and himself, he undertook various jobs typical for young people in rural Mauritius at the time, including mason apprentice, lorry helper, labourer, sugar cane cutter, vegetable seller, and assisting in a bicycle repair shop.

He also engaged in small-scale entrepreneurial activity, such as purchasing eggs from local households and selling them at retail prices with the assistance of his mother. However, one of his more demanding jobs during his teenage years was breaking boulders into gravel for road construction under a government rural development programme in the District of Flacq.

== Influential Mentors ==
It was at Brisée Verdière Anglican Aided School in the 1950s, whilst being a mature pupil, that Ramsurrun was influenced by one of his teachers named Ghislain Emmanuel, who also lived in Brisée Verdière. On one occasion, the Headteacher sent Ramsurrun to deliver a message to Emmanuel, who was studying for his B.A. degree in his spare time and training to become a priest. Emmanuel's dedication to education served as an early inspiration for Ramsurrun to pursue a B.A. degree in the future, as reported by Ramsurrun himself. In 1970, before leaving for India to study for his own B.A. degree, Ramsurrun presented Emmanuel with his first book, Illustrated History of the Arya Samaj Movement in Mauritius, by which time Emmanuel had become Archdeacon of Mauritius.

The other influencer in the life of Ramsurrun was Dindoyal Bundhun, a voluntary Hindi teacher in the same village, who Ramsurrun met by chance at a time when the latter was engaged in different part-time jobs to make ends meet. Bundhun offered Ramsurrun free evening Hindi classes at the nearby Social Welfare Centre. Ramsurrun continued as Bundhun’s student until he was ready to take the Parichay examination, organised by the Hindi Pracharini Sabha, in 1954, which he passed. Thanks to Bundhun's support and influence, Ramsurrun's enthusiasm for the Hindi language continued, and years later, in 1962, he also passed the Prathama examination. These qualifications reinforced Ramsurrun's proficiency in Hindi and contributed to his later career as a primary and secondary school Hindi teacher and author of several books in Hindi.

== Education ==
Ramsurrun began his primary education at the Aryan Vedic School of Laventure before transferring to Belle Vue Maurel Government School and later Brisée Verdière Anglican Aided School, where he completed Standard VI at the age of 16. Frequent school changes and exam retakes, partly due to family relocation and financial hardship, reportedly disrupted his academic progress.

After primary school at Brisée Verdière, Ramsurrun faced significant challenges in accessing formal secondary education, yet he remained determined to pursue learning. Influenced by local teachers who encouraged his interest in academic study and Hindi language instruction, he began preparing for examinations through evening classes. In 1954 he passed the Parichay examination organised by the Hindi Pracharini Sabha, and later the Prathama in 1962.

In 1956, when the family moved from Brisée Verdière to Vallée des Prêtres, Ramsurrun was 19 years old. Living near Port Louis, the capital of Mauritius, provided him with greater opportunities for part-time work as well as access to educational resources such as public libraries, secondary schools, and private tuition. Around that period, he met Professor Basdeo Bissoondoyal, who referred him to his brother, Sookdeo Bissoondoyal, for private tuition. Ramsurrun studied under Sookdeo Bissoondoyal up to Form III before enrolling at the Port Louis High School in 1961, where he attended classes for two years. At Port Louis High School, Heeralall Bhugaloo, Gunnoo Gangaram and Boodram Pratab became his English, Health Science and History teachers respectively.

To finance his studies, Ramsurrun worked part-time. Each morning he delivered bread from a local bakery in Sainte-Croix to households at Vallée des Prêtres and surrounding areas such as Roche Bois, Terre Rouge, and Baie du Tombeau. He also cultivated vegetables, particularly lettuce and spring onions, which he sold locally, including to a tea shop in Port Louis. With the income from these activities, he supported himself through school.

In tandem with all these multi-tasking, Ramsurrun secured a part-time position teaching Hindi at the evening school Anand Pathshala in Vallée des Prêtres itself, earning a monthly salary of Rs. 25. When his request for a salary increase was denied and the school subsequently closed, he sought other opportunities to continue teaching.

Ramsurrun and several collaborators then established the Arya Samaj Society at Sainte-Croix and he began offering Hindi lessons to young students after school hours in a local venue known as a "baitka". He received a monthly salary of Rs. 25 from the Executive Committee of the Ste. Croix Arya Samaj. In line with the community’s emphasis on female education, he also initiated an adult education class exclusively for women under the name Ste. Croix Arya Samaj Ladies' Society, which included his mother as one of the students. According to journalist Sheila Rughoonundun, this may have been the first adult Hindi education course in Mauritius.

During this period, Ramsurrun was actively involved in broader community initiatives, including the planning of the annual "Varshi Utsav" (Yearly Celebration), which highlighted the Arya Samaj Society’s contributions to the community.

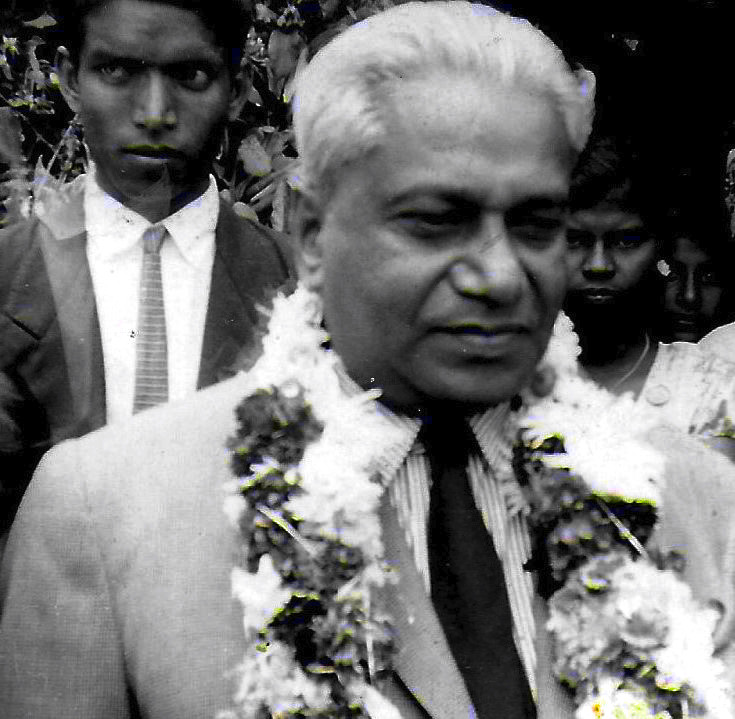
Dr. Seewoosagur Ramgoolam with Pahlad Ramsurrun in the background at a Ste. Croix Arya Samaj yearly event

The event included prayers, speeches, cultural performances, and participation by local political figures belonging to the Labour Party of Mauritius, such as Dr. Seewoosagur Ramgoolam, Mr. Satcam Boolell, Mr. Veerasamy Ringadoo, and Dr. Beergoonath Ghurburrun. Attendance by members of the Labour Party reflected the alignment of some of the party’s ideals with those of the Arya Samaj Movement, particularly regarding the promotion of social development and education in Mauritius.

Eventually, Ramsurrun's studies at Port Louis High School paid off when he passed the General Certificate of Education Ordinary Level (GCE O-Level) examination in Hindi and History. With the new and previously acquired Hindi qualifications, Ramsurrun secured a place at the Teachers' Training College in Beau Bassin as a trainee Hindi teacher in 1964. After completing his training, he was appointed to his first permanent post as a primary school Hindi teacher in 1965

In November 1967, Ramsurrun married Ilwantee Mungutroy and settled in Beau Bassin. While continuing to work as a primary school teacher, he prepared privately for the Cambridge School Certificate (S.C.) examination, which he passed in 1969 (in six subjects). That same year, to commemorate the birth centenary of Mahatma Gandhi, the Indian Council for International Cooperation (ICIC) organised an international essay competition entitled "Relation between your country and India". Ramsurrun entered the competition after seeing an announcement in Aryoday, a weekly newspaper of the Arya Samaj in Mauritius. He won third prize and travelled to New Delhi to receive his award from Gulzarilal Nanda, the then Railway Minister of India. Reporting on the event, The Hindustan Times (21 February 1970) noted: "Pahlad Ramsurrun has been one of the winners from other lands (Mauritius). He delivered a brilliant exposé in chaste Hindi at Mavlankar Bhawan, New Delhi, and drew a brief outline of the history of Mauritius and the way the people there have been influenced by Indian thoughts and ideas." Ramsurrun's journey to India to collect the prize also became an opportunity for him to pursue higher education at the University of Delhi.

== Career ==
Ramsurrun began his professional career in 1964 when he enrolled at the Teachers' Training College in Beau Bassin to train as a primary school Hindi teacher. After completing his training, he worked in primary education for five years before leaving for India in 1970 to pursue a Bachelor of Arts degree in English, Hindi, History, and Political Science at Sri Venkateswara College, University of Delhi.

On his return to Mauritius in 1973 with his B.A degree, Ramsurrun spent a spell of six months teaching Hindi at St-Enfant Jesus Government School in Rose-Hill, before being appointed as an Education Officer to teach Hindi at the Royal College Curepipe. Eventually, he became Head of the Oriental Languages Department at the college, and later held similar positions at Gaetan Raynal State College, Droopnath Ramphul State College, and Royal College Port Louis, where he remained until his retirement in 1997. As such, Ramsurrun is reportedly known for his contribution to the Hindi language in Mauritius, in addition to being one of the first generations of Hindi teachers to start teaching Hindi at secondary school in the country.

Alongside his teaching career, Ramsurrun established himself as a writer, editor and historian. By 2016, he had authored 70 books, including Folk Tales of Mauritius and Mahatma Gandhi and his impact on Mauritius. He writes in Hindi, English, and French, with subject areas ranging from folk tales and Hindi literature to history and culture. His first book, Illustrated History of the Arya Samaj Movement in Mauritius, was published in 1970. In addition to his work as an author, Ramsurrun has contributed articles as a freelance journalist, both nationally and internationally. He also serves as chief editor of Indradhanush, a trilingual, quarterly magazine published in Hindi, English, and French.

== Legacy ==
Indradhanush

On 12 August 1988, Ramsurrun and his collaborators founded the Indradhanush Sanskritic Parishad, a cultural movement aimed at promoting Hindi literature and multicultural awareness in Mauritius. To support its mission, Ramsurrun launched Indradhanush, a quarterly Hindi-language magazine, the first issue of which appeared on 17 December 1988. In interviews, Ramsurrun explained that the magazine was intended to highlight overlooked figures in Mauritian history and literature, such as Manilal Doctor, Pandit Atmaram, and Robert Edward Hart, whose contributions had not been officially recognised at the time.

For its first thirteen years, Indradhanush was published exclusively in Hindi. Recognising the limitations of this readership, Ramsurrun decided in 2000 to expand its reach by publishing it in three languages—Hindi, English, and French—in a single volume. To some extent, it was aimed at reflecting the linguistic pluralism of Mauritius. The inaugural trilingual edition, released in September 2000, was dedicated to Sir Seewoosagur Ramgoolam, and included 250 pages and contributions from over 75 collaborators. Since then, Indradhanush has attracted a readership both locally and internationally, including subscribers from the United Kingdom and Canada.

Research on Gandhi's 1901 visit to Mauritius

Ramsurrun's book Mahatma Gandhi and his impact on Mauritius (1995) addressed longstanding uncertainties surrounding Gandhi's brief visit to the island in 1901. For decades, conflicting or incomplete accounts of the visit existed, with some history books omitting it entirely and others giving contradictory dates and details. Through extensive research in libraries, archives, newspapers, and unpublished documents, Ramsurrun reconstructed a detailed chronology of the visit. He concluded that Gandhi arrived in Port Louis on 29 October 1901 aboard the S.S. Nowshera and departed on 15 November 1901.

During his 18-day stay, Gandhi resided with Ahmed Goolam Mohamed in Port Louis and attended three documented events: a visit to the Supreme Court (5 November), a banquet at the Governor's residence at Le Réduit (9 November), and a banquet hosted by Muslim traders in Port Louis (13 November). By establishing these dates and events, Ramsurrun argued that Gandhi's stay was limited to Port Louis and Le Réduit, contrary to later claims that he travelled further afield. His findings, based on contemporary press reports, corrected earlier inconsistencies and clarified the chronology of Gandhi's 1901 visit to Mauritius.

== See also ==
- Mauritian literature
- List of Mauritian writers
- List of magazines in Mauritius
- Culture of Mauritius

== Awards and Honours ==
- In 2005, Ramsurrun was awarded the President's Meritorious Service Medal (P.M.S.M) by the Government of Mauritius.
- In 2011, he was conferred the rank of Member of the Order of the Star and Key of the Indian Ocean (M.S.K) by the President of Mauritius.
- In 2014, he was awarded the Pravasi Bharatiya Hindi Bushan Samman by the Hindi Santham of Uttar Pradesh, India, for his contribution to the Hindi language outside India.
- In 2017, he was awarded the Hindi Ratna Award by the Hindi Bhawan of New Delhi, India, for his contribution to the Hindi language.
- In 2024, he received the Lifetime Achievement Award from the Ministry of Arts and Cultural Heritage of Mauritius for his contribution to literature.

== Bibliography ==
- Ramsurrun, Pahlad (1970). Illustrated History of the Arya Samaj Movement in Mauritius. Beau Bassin, Mauritius: Mini Printing Establishment.
- Ramsurrun, Pahlad (1974). Mauritius Ki Lok Kathayen. Kashmere Gate, Delhi: Rajpal & Sons. (In Hindi)
- Ramsurrun, Pahlad (1982). Folk Tales of Mauritius. New Delhi: Sterling Publishers.
- Ramsurrun, Pahlad (1994). Rama Krishna Mission in Mauritius. New Delhi: Atmaram & Sons.
- Ramsurrun, Pahlad (1995). Mahatma Gandhi and his Impact on Mauritius. New Delhi: Sterling Publishers.
- Ramsurrun, Pahlad (1995). Tales and Legends of Mauritius. New Delhi: Atmaram & Sons.
- Ramsurrun, Pahlad (1996). Golden Legends: Mauritius. Singapore: Heinemann, South East Asia.
- Ramsurrun, Pahlad (2001). Mahatma Gandhi et son Impact sur l'Ile Maurice. New Delhi: Sterling Publishers. (In French)
- Ramsurrun, Pahlad, and Sangeeta Ramsurrun-Nunkoo (2007). Manilal Doctor – His Political Activities in Mauritius. New Delhi: Sterling Publishers.
- Ramsurrun, Pahlad (2006). Sir Seewoosagur Ramgoolam Battles for a Democratic Constitution of Mauritius, Vols. I & II. New Delhi: New Dawn Press.
