= Mouvement Militant Mauricien Socialiste Progressiste =

Political party in Mauritius

- Leader: Dev Virahsawmy
- Founded: 23 March 1973
- Split from: Mauritian Militant Movement
- Ideology: Communism; Marxism–Leninism; Maoism

The Mouvement Militant Mauricien Socialiste Progressiste (MMMSP) was a political party in Mauritius.

== History ==
MMMSP was founded by a splinter group led by linguist, playwright and politician Dev Virahsawmy on 23 March 1973 soon after the dissidents had left the Mauritian Militant Movement (MMM). The split from the MMM occurred shortly after the release from jail of MMM leaders and other trade unionists on 23 December 1972 during the state of emergency. Other notable members of MMMSP were: Hervé Masson, Reynolds Michel, Geean Mahadeea, Roshan Sobhee, Georges Comerasamy, Swadicq Peerally, Peter Craig, Iqbal Kalla, Patti Craig, Mario Dada, Yoga Appadu, Dan Callikan, Amba Lutchumanen, Brigitte Masson, and Bam Cuttayen.

The newly-formed party was also dubbed MMM sans Paul, meaning "MMM without Paul" given that its founders wanted to preserve their stance as revolutionaries and wanted to distance themselves from Paul Bérenger who was making too many compromises with the capitalists and the establishment.

== Achievements ==
Prominent members of MMMSP were politically active from 1973 until 1980. They also founded the newspaper Soley Ruz as well as the music group which was also called Soley Ruz. The newspaper was written in Creole language and the music group released several new songs of the style "chanson engagé" about the struggle of the working class. It also revived old Mauritian folk songs.
