= Dan Callikan =

Mauritian politician (1947–2023)

Dhananjay Calikan (22 April 1947 – 8 April 2023) was a Mauritian politician, political adviser and author.

== Early life, education, media career & family ==
Dan Callikan grew up in the village of Mahebourg which is located in the district of Grand Port District in the south of Mauritius. He attended the secondary school Royal College Port Louis and was then awarded a scholarship to study in France although he had also secured a scholarship to study in the UK as a "laureate" of the Higher School Certificate. When he returned to Mauritius he worked as a journalist for the Mauritius Broadcasting Corporation (MBC).

Dan Callikan was married to Brigitte Masson who is sociologist, former activist, author, and daughter of Hervé Masson.

== Political career ==
Dan Callikan started his political career in 1973 as a member of the splinter group Mouvement Militant Mauricien Socialiste Progressiste (MMMSP).

Callikan was a close associate of Sir Anerood Jugnauth and from 1983 he was a senior adviser at the Prime Minister's Office (PMO) during Sir Anerood Jugnauth's terms in office. He was appointed Director General of the Mauritius Broadcasting Corporation (MBC) in 1986. However, foreseeing Jugnauth's defeat, by the time of the 1995 elections Callikan had switched allegiances and stopped supporting Jugnauth and the MSM.

Following the Labour Party's electoral defeat of 2000, he supported the Labour Party by launching a newspaper called La Gazette. He was appointed an adviser to Prime Minister Navin Ramgoolam when the latter was elected in 2005. From 2009 to 2014 he was Director General of the MBC during Navin Ramgoolam's term in office as Prime Minister.

== Publications ==
In 2002, Callikan co-authored a book Mauritius Light and Space with Christian Bossu-Picat.
