= Priya Hein =

Mauritian author

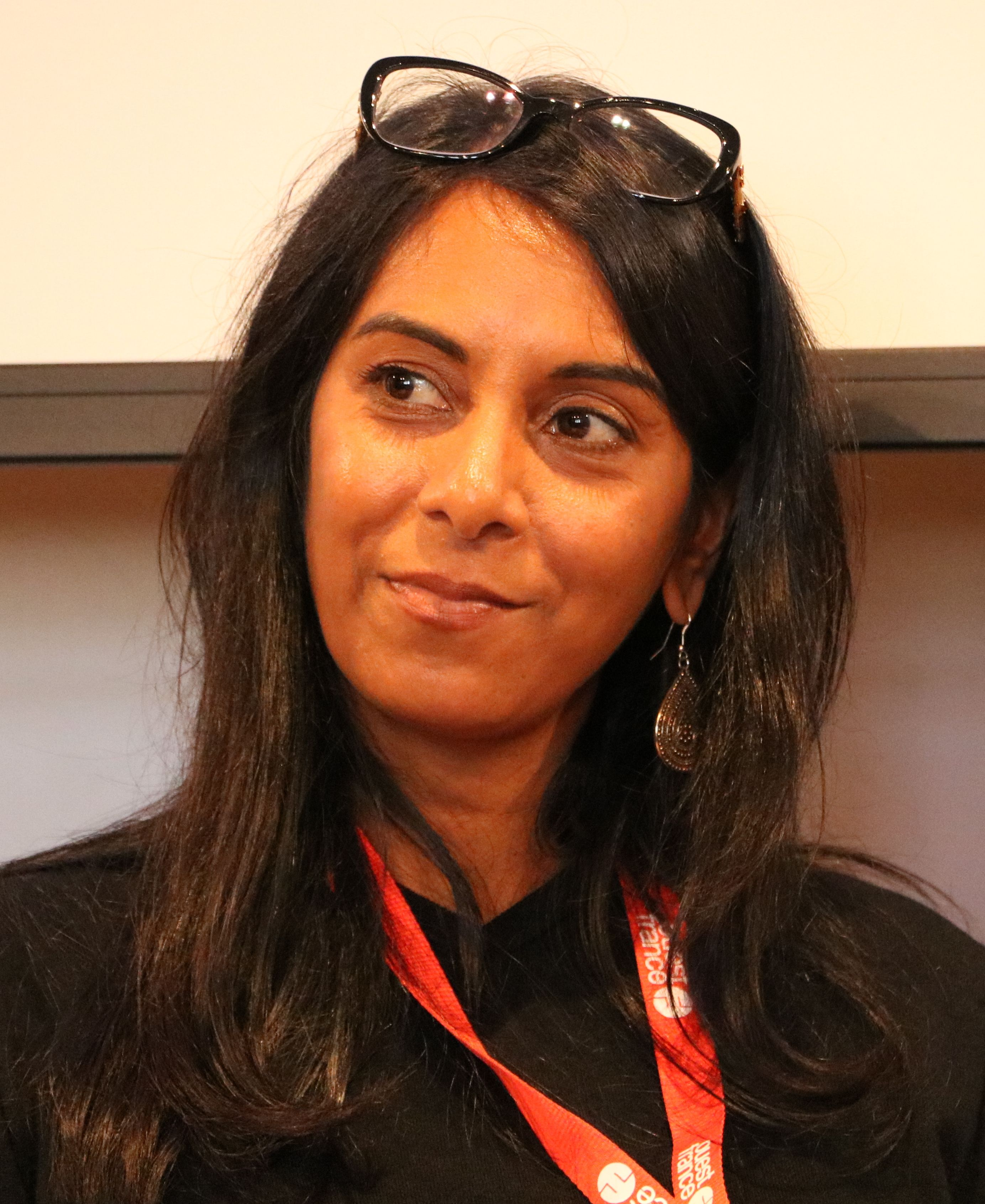
- Born: Priya N. Rughooputh; Mauritius
- Education: Manchester Metropolitan University (LLB, MA) Institut d'études politiques de Strasbourg (BA) Vrije Universiteit Brussel (MA)
- Spouse: Stephan Hein
- Children: 2
- Writing career
- Language: English, French, German, Mauritian Creole, Rodriguan Creole
- Subjects: Realistic Fiction, Children's Books, Non-Fiction
- Notable works: Tamarin; Riambel; A Dodo Named Feno
- Notable awards: Prix littéraire Athéna; 2023 – Won (Riambel) Jean Fanchette Prize; 2021 – Won (Riambel) Miles Morland Scholarship; 2023 – Shortlist

Priya Hein is a Mauritian award-winning author known for her children's book series A Little Dodo Called Feno and her novel Riambel. Hein won the Jean Fanchette Prize chaired by Nobel Prize Laureate J.M.G. Le Clézio and Prix littéraire Athéna for Riambel. Her novel Tamarin was shortlisted for the 2026 Edward Stanford Travel Writing Award alongside Nobel Prize Laureate Abdulrazak Gurnah.

== Personal life ==
Priya Hein was born in Mauritius and left the island to study in the UK, France and Belgium. For many years Hein lived in Munich, Germany and now lives in Mauritius with her husband Stefan Hein and two children.

== Career ==
Hein began her career in political science at the European Parliament in Strasbourg, France and European Commission in Brussels, Belgium. She worked as a Parliamentary Assistant to a Labour Member of European Parliament (MEP), the Labour Party and as a legal assistant in Munich for 11 years.

Hein became interested in writing at a young age when she "realized that the stories she was reading were ending too quickly."

In 2019, Hein was a mentee in the Women's Creative Mentorship Project at the University of Iowa International Writing Program. In 2024 she was selected for the University of Iowa’s International Writing Program Fall Residency.

Hein has written in a variety of genres since the beginning of her career. She has 5+ children's books, two adult novels, and has written for textbooks, journals, and non-fiction books and articles for The Financial Times. Hein's books have been written in and translated into English, French, German, Rodriguan Creole and Mauritian Creole. She has also written dual language books, or books that feature two languages.

She was inspired by her daughter to write her A Little Dodo Called Feno series. Her sequel, Feno the Little Dodo's Rainy Day Picnic, was chosen by the Mauritius Institute of Education to be included in a book for primary schools. She has also written for the primary school textbook Ki Pase La?

Her adult novels, Riambel (2023) and Tamarin (2025), published in English, were released to critical acclaim. Riambel was inspired by the Black Lives Matter movement in the United States and experiences of migrants, like herself, in the European continent.

The draft of Riambel was awarded the Jean Fanchette Prize in 2023, an award that partly inspired the Hein's creation as she wanted to meet judge and Nobel Prize in Literature laureate Jean-Marie Leclézio. Laeitita Erskine described Riambel as "a sensual and deceptively simple evocation of generational slavery." Brittle Paper named Riambel one of "100 Notable African Books of 2023" and Isele Magazine named it one of their most anticipated books of 2023. Riambel was awarded the 2023 Prix littéraire Athéna for the theme "Commitment, freedom and truth."

Her second adult novel, Tamarin, received similar acclaim. Trinidadian author and lawyer Celeste Muhammad wrote "in Tamarin, Priya Hein tells the story with such bravery, candor, and evocative detail that I often mistook it for a true account... Women everywhere will see themselves—their deepest loves and betrayals, and their most delicate relationships—reflected in these pages." National Geographic Traveller described the book as "[a] vivid examination of love, generational trauma and how the impact of slavery still haunts Mauritian lives."

Hein developed the first writing residency in Mauritius, the Tamarin Writing Residency, which began in December of 2025. She created the free one-week residency because:

The thing that I kept going back to is how in my darkest moments, it is always writing that I turn to. Through writing, I try to make sense of the deeply fragmented world we live in and explore what it is to be human. The possibility offered by a blank page, to write our own narratives, in our own language and space, as a form of resistance, becomes a necessity. We do not need permission to write, to question and to challenge institutional power and literary exclusion.

— Priya Hein, Brittle Paper

She was invited to Chair the Prix Goncourt - Choix de l’île Maurice 2026 by the Institut Français de Maurice under the patronage of l’Académie Goncourt Paris. She won the prestigious Miles Morland Scholarship 2026 and was selected curator of the African Book Festival Berlin 2027.

== Bibliography ==
- Hein, Priya (25 September 2025). Tamarin. Cover by Luke Bird and Mila Gupta. The Indigo Press. ISBN 978-1911648932.
- Hein, Priya (23 February 2023). Riambel. The Indigo Press. pp. 1–160. ISBN 9781911648499.
- Hein, Priya; Mary-des-Ailes (2018). Ti Solo Grand Héro (in Rodriguan Creole and French). Illustrated by un groupe d'enfants de Rodrigues. Vizavi Éditions. ISBN 978 99949 49 08 3.
- Hein, Priya; Dabydeen, David; del Pilar Kaladeen, Maria; Hosein, Kevin; Gitanjali Pyndiah, Gitanjali; Angelica Oluoch, Angelica; Prithiraj Dullay, Prithiraj; Cynthia Kistasamy, Cynthia; Sethi, Anita (April 2018). "Paradise Island". In Dabydeen, David; del Pilar Kaladeen, Maria; Ramnarine, Tina K,. (eds.). We Mark Your Memory: writings from the descendants of indenture. London: University of London Press. ISBN 9781912250073.
- Hein, Priya (2015). Do children fly? (in English, French, and German). ISBN 9783943052794.
- Hein, Priya (21 November 2014). Under the Flamboyant Tree. France: La Librairie Mauricienne Numériques. ISBN 978-9994939213.
- Hein, Priya (2013). Blue Bear (in English and German). Edition Tintenfaß. ISBN 9783943052350.
- Hein, Priya. Feno Little Sleep and Picnic in the Rain.
- Hein, Priya. Little Dodo’s ABC Book. Feno Le Petit Dodo Book 3. France: Editions Orphie. ISBN 9782877636568.
- Hein, Priya. Feno the Little Dodo’s Rainy Day Picnic. A Little Dodo Called Feno Book 2.
- Hein, Priya. A Little Dodo Called Feno. A Little Dodo Called Feno Book 1 (in English and French). Illustrated by Lynda Nelson. Editions de l'Ocean Indien. ISBN 978-9990306132.

== Awards ==
| Year | Work | Award | Awarding Body | Result |
|---|---|---|---|---|
| 2026 | Tamarin | Fiction with a Sense of Place 2026 | Edward Stanford Travel Writing Awards | Shortlist |
| 2023 | Riambel | Prix littéraire Athéna Theme: Commitment, freedom and truth | Athéna Book Fair | Won |
| 2023 | | Miles Morland Scholarship | Miles Morland Foundation (MMF) | Shortlist |
| 2021 | Riambel | Jean Fanchette Prize | Municipal Government of Beau-Bassin Rose-Hill | Won |
| 2021 | | Prix de l’Atelier Littéraire | | Shortlist |
| 2021 | Riambel | Literary Workshop Prize | | Finalist |
| 2017 | | Astrid Lindgren Memorial Award | Swedish Government and Swedish Arts Council | Nominee |
| 2015 | | Mauritian Achievers Award | | Finalist |
| 2014 | | The Outstanding Young Person Award | Junior Chamber International of Mauritius | Finalist |
