= Tales from Mauritius =

Children's storybook

- Author: Ramesh Ramdoyal; edited by Rodney Phillips
- Illustrator: Nazal Rosunally
- Cover artist: Nazal Rosunally
- Country: Mauritius
- Language: English; Mauritian Creole
- Genre: Children's literature, Adventure
- Publisher: Macmillan Publishers
- Published: 1979
- Media type: Print (paperback)
- No. of books: 3

Tales from Mauritius is the name of a storybook written by a popular Mauritian author, Ramesh Ramdoyal, and edited by Rodney Phillips. The first edition was published in 1979 by Macmillan Publishers Ltd. The second book in the series is called More Tales from Mauritius, published in 2009, and the third book Further Tales from Mauritius published in 2013.

The first two books were edited for young children, and the third one, edited by Osman Publishing, targets a wider audience. The third book contains 13 tales.

The author Ramesh Ramdoyal studied in Oxford and was the director of the Mauritius Institute of Education.
