= Indradhanush (Indian magazine) =

- Editor: Anshumala Gupta
- Categories: Children's magazine
- Frequency: Monthly
- Circulation: 10,000
- Founded: 2004
- Country: Delhi, India
- Language: Hindi
- Website: Indradhanush

Indradhanush, was an Indian children's magazine. Anshumala Gupta, a Delhi-based former mechanical engineer from Indian Institute of Technology, Kanpur, founded the magazine. It targeted children between the age of 9 and 16. The magazine was started in 2004. It touched a circulation of 10,000 copies. Priced at Rs 10, it was one of the most popular magazines among children in Himachal Pradesh, Uttar Pradesh and Uttarakhand.

The magazine is supported by Association for India's Development, a non-governmental organisation promoting sustainable, equitable and just development in India. The organisation supports grassroots organizations in India and initiates efforts in various interconnected spheres such as education, livelihoods, natural resources including land, water and energy, agriculture, health, women's empowerment and social justice.

== About the magazine ==
Indradhanush means rainbow in Hindi and contained stories, poems, articles on science and do-it-yourself experiments. Some of the articles were from popular children's writers from India, while others were adapted and translated from work in other languages. Anshumala, with the help of a network of volunteers, distributed copies of the magazines to schools that pass them down to their students.

The aim of the magazine was to build a unique space in children's lives, so that children's love for it made it run, children became first its customers, and then slowly evolved into writers, contributors, critics and editors too. The first and foremost objective of the magazine would be to generate an interest in reading in children who never saw anything good, other than their school books. The magazine must throw challenges to the child's intellect and inquisitiveness. Make the child think and question the natural as well as the social world around him/her. The magazine is not a pure science publication, but one which touches all aspects of life, with the subliminal messages of a scientific and humanitarian spirit.
