= Davina Itoo =

Mauritian writer

Sandiabye Ittoo (born 2 August 1983), known by her pen name Davina Itoo, is a Mauritian writer. She won the Prix Jean-Fanchette in 2015 for her short story "La Proscrite". In 2019, she won the Prix Indianocéanie 2019 for her novel Misère.

== Biography ==
Itoo was born on 2 August 1983 in Quatre Bornes. She completed primary studies at the Visitation RCA school, and secondary studies at Queen Elizabeth College. She then lived in France for twelve years. During this time, she studied at the Sorbonne; in 2015, she completed a Doctorate in French literature on the works of Albert Cohen. Upon her return, she began teaching French literature and phonetics at the Open University of Mauritius.
