= Marcelle Lagesse =

Mauritian journalist and writer

Marie Rita Marcelle
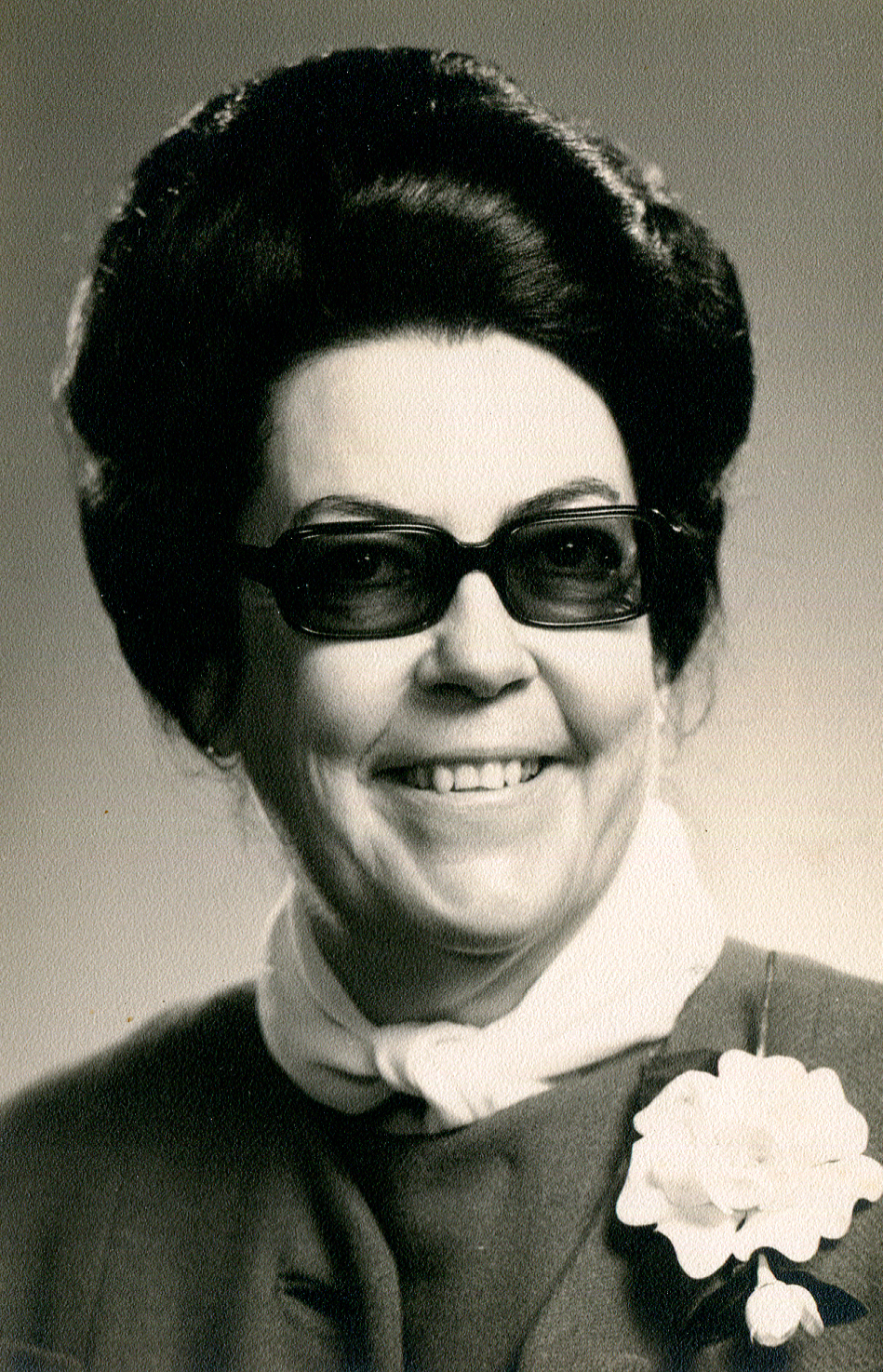
- Born: Marie Rita Marcelle Caboche; 7 February 1916; Quatre Bornes, British Mauritius
- Died: 8 March 2011 (aged 95)
- Citizenship: Mauritian
- Occupations: journalist; writer
- Employers: Lagesse; newspaper Action
- Notable work: La Diligence; Les contes du samedi; Le vingt Floréal au matin, novel (1960); D'un Carnet; Maurice vue du ciel; Une jeune femme au Mont Limon, novel (1993); Les Palmiers de la Source, Theatre

Marie Rita Marcelle Lagesse O.S.K (7 February 1916 – 8 March 2011) was a Mauritian journalist and writer.

== Biography ==
She was born in Quatre Bornes and married Gaston Lagesse at a young age. After she was widowed, she went to the Salomon Islands where her father was administrator, living there from 1938 until 1942, when she returned to Mauritius. In 1945, she published a collection of short stories Les contes du samedi under the pseudonym Rita Marc. In 1958, she published her first novel La Diligence s'éloigne à l'aube; it was awarded the Robert Bargues prize.

From 1942 to 1950, she contributed to Savez vous que?, the official publication of the Mauritius Public Relations Office. Lagesse was also writing for the three Mauritian daily newspapers Le Cernéen, Le Mauricien and Advance. From 1961 to 1971, she wrote a weekly column for the newspaper Action. Lagesse retired from journalism in 1987.

Her novels were translated into Russian and English. Lagesse wrote several plays, including a radio play for the Office de Radiodiffusion Télévision Française, Villebague. She also researched the history of Mauritius, publishing the results through Editions des Archives de lîle Maurice.

She was named an Officer in the Ordre des Palmes Académiques and a Chevalier in the National Order of Merit. In 1981, she was given French citizenship by decree. She was elevated to the rank of Officer of the Order of the Star and Key of the Indian Ocean (O.S.K) in 2015.

She died at the age of 95 following an extended illness.

== Selected works ==
- Les contes du samedi, short stories (1945)
- La diligence s'éloigne à l'aube, novel (1958), received the Prix Robert Bargues
- Le vingt Floréal au matin, novel (1960)
- Villebague, novel
- Cette maison pleine de fantômes, novel (1962)
- D'un Carnet, novel
- A la découverte de l'Ile Maurice, Historical (1970)
- Sont amis que vent emporte, novel (1974), received the Prix des Mascareignes
- Des pas sur le sable, novel (1975)
- Villebague, novel
- Une lanterne au mat d'artimon, novel
- L'Ile de France avant La Bourdonnais, Historical
- L'Hôtel du Gouvernement, Historical
- Blyth Brothers & Co. Ltd. Historical
- Maurice vue du ciel
- 150 ans de jeunesse, Histoire de la Mauritius Commercial Bank, Historic
- Une jeune femme au Mont Limon, novel (1993)
- Les Palmiers de la Source, Theatre
- Comme un feu de Proue, Theatre
- L'Amour à travers les âges, Theatre
- Un homme parmi les autres, Theatre
- Chantons la liberté, Theatre
- Villebague, Theatre
- Carolyne, Theatre
