= Rabemananjara =

Rabemananjara is a Malagasy surname. Notable people with the surname include:

- Charles Rabemananjara (born 1947), Malagasy politician and former Prime Minister of Madagascar
- Jacques Rabemananjara (1913–2005), Malagasy politician
- Praxis Rabemananjara (born 1983), Malagasy footballer

== See also ==
- Rabemananjara Stadium
