= Issa Asgarally =

Mauritian linguist

Issa Asgarally is a Mauritian doctor in linguistics and a professor at the Mauritius Institute of Education. He is regarded as a leading intellectual figure on the island and is influential in literature and the media. His native language is Mauritian Creole, though he is fluent in French and English as well (Asgarally teaches in the latter).

== Biography ==
Asgarally was born in a part of Mauritius where many ethnic groups are co-located and has tried to bring the groups together through a philosophy of peace. In this regard, Asgarally opposes the “multicultural” approach, which he believes emphasizes differences between cultures and individuals, and instead advocates an emphasis upon the commonalities between people. He asserts that there is a fundamental unity of people as human beings which can then become the basis upon which any balanced system needs be built. As a result of such balance, Asgarally explains that people would see each other as equal partners and enjoy a confidence in both themselves and each other - there would also be equal access to economic and political power.

Asgarally has published ten books on diverse but related topics, including literature, social issues, philosophy, history, education, culture and the arts. He has also written about the consequences of slavery in the Indian Ocean.

Together with the winner of the 2008 Nobel Prize for Literature, Jean-Marie Gustave Le Clézio (Clézio's parents had strong ties with Mauritius), Asgarally has created the Fondation pour l'Interculturel et la Paix (FIP) website.

== Books ==
- L'interculturel ou la guerre (Préface de J.M.G.Le Clézio):Editions M.S.M.Ltd, 2005
- "Comme un roman sans fin & autres textes" (Préface d'Ananda Devi): Osman Publishing, 2012
- Des livres & des idées: Editions le Printemps, 2010, 512 pages
- L'île Maurice des cultures (Mauritius: An Island of Cultures): Editions Le Printemps, 2006
- De l'Esclavage (in collaboration): Editions Grand Océan, Ile de la Réunion, 2005
- Pour une histoire de la télévision publique à Maurice :Editions M.S.M.Ltd
- Education et Culture à l'aube du troisième millénaire (Education and Culture at the Dawn of the Third Millennium): Editions Le Printemps, 1999, 192 pages
- Littérature et révolte: Editions Le Flamboyant, 1985
