= Raymonde de Kervern =

- Born: October 3, 1899; Curepipe
- Died: December 1, 1973 (aged 74)
- Occupations: Poet; Writer

Raymonde de Kervern (1898 or 1899 – 1973) was a Mauritian poet.

== Life ==
Raymonde de Kervern was born in Curepipe, the daughter of a doctor, Joseph Alphonse, and Marie-Jeanne-Wilhelmine Piat. In 1918 she married Louis-Gustave-Philippe de Kervern.

Her poems were collected in a single Collected Works in 2014.

== Works ==
- Cloches mystiques, 1928.
- Le Jardin féerique, 1935.
- L'île Ronde et son oiseau, 1935
- Apsara la danseuse, 1941.
- Abîmes, 1951.
