= Eric Bahloo =

Mauritian writer

Eric Bahloo (born 1964) is a Mauritian writer.

== Early life ==
Eric Bahloo was born on the island of Mauritius, the son of Ignace Bahloo and Ivy Saminadas. He studied for two years at Collège Eden in Mauritius. In 1979 when he was 15 years old he left the island and moved to France where he studied accountancy and law.

== Works ==
- L'affaire Azor Adélaide: le plus célèbre crime politique à Maurice 2011
- José Moirt: Gagner ne suffit pas 2019
