= Dev Virahsawmy =

Mauritian politician (1942–2023)

Elected member of Legislative Assembly (Constituency No. 5 Pamplemousses-Triolet)
- In office 1970–1972

Personal details
- Born: 16 March 1942 Quartier-Militaire, British Mauritius
- Died: 7 November 2023 (aged 81) Rose Hill, Mauritius
- Party: MMM, MMMSP, Parti Travailliste
- Education: University of Edinburgh

Dev Virahsawmy (16 March 1942 – 7 November 2023) was a Mauritian politician, playwright, poet and advocate of the Mauritian Creole language. Though he wrote easily in both French and English, Virahsawmy was most renowned for his efforts to popularise the use of Creole.

== Early life ==
Virahsawmy was born in Quartier-Militaire, Mauritius on 16 March 1942 to Appanah "Ramdass" Virah Sawmy and Damiyantee "Gouna" Pyndiah. He spent his early childhood in Goodlands, where he lost the use of his left arm due to polio and after the death of his mother he went to live with his grandparents at Beau-Bassin. He started his secondary schooling at Collège St-Joseph in Curepipe where he faced racism, hinduphobia and ableism from Franco-Mauritians and Coloureds and was relieved to complete the final years of his schooling at Royal College Port Louis. Virahsawmy then travelled to Scotland to study languages, literature and linguistics at the Edinburgh University. He was born Hindu, had mostly Christian friends and oscillated between Marxist-Atheism, Agnosticism and Hinduism during his life.

Virahsawmy belongs to the Vaish a caste of businessmen. The Vaish in India, as in Mauritius.

Dev Virahsawmy's father was a minister of the Labour Party who later defected to rival party MTD. Former MMM minister Jayen Cuttaree was Dev Virahsawmy's brother-in-law.

== Political career ==
Between 1968 and 1973, Virahsawmy was a politician and one of the three leaders of the Mauritian Militant Movement (MMM). On 22 September 1970, he became the first member of the MMM to be elected to the Legislative Assembly by winning the vacant seat at by-elections held in Constituency No. 5 (Pamplemousses-Triolet). These by-elections resulted from the untimely death in office of former Attorney General Lall Jugnauth who had been duly elected in Constituency No. 5 at the 1967 General Elections under the Independence Party/IFB banner. Virahsawmy conceded that his victory at the 1970 by-elections was not because rural voters liked the newly-formed MMM, a party founded by urban idealists. Instead he attributed the MMM's first electoral victory solely to voters' desperation to express their anger and disappointment towards Seewoosagur Ramgoolam and Gaetan Duval who formed an alliance in 1969 simply to allow Ramgoolam to stay in power after Bissoondoyal's IFB had deserted Ramgoolam's government, and UDM had splintered out of the PMSD. A few months earlier Ramgoolam and Duval had bitterly fought against each other during the pre-independence 1967 electoral campaign. However, Paul Bérenger disagreed with Virahsawmy's analysis and instead started to dream about the MMM's future electoral victories nationwide, especially by the aggressive application of identity politics.

Throughout the year 1971 the MMM worked closely with trade unions to ramp up its campaign of nationwide strikes, violent thugs of the PMSD attacked Virahsawmy's house with Molotov cocktails.

In early 1972 Virahsawmy was jailed at the National Intelligence Unit (NIU)'s political prison within the Police compounds of Line Barracks in Port Louis for refusing to pay a fine for "contempt of court" after making public comments regarding the Labour-PMSD-CAM regime's handling of strike actions. The prison officers provided Virahsawmy with custom-made prisoner's uniforms with long sleeves in order to conceal his atrophied left arm, which resulted from a Poliovirus infection during his childhood. During his stay in prison Virahsawmy still had to appear in court as a key witness of the Azor Adelaide murder case. Although he resigned from the Legislative Assembly in 1972 to protest against his imprisonment, by-elections were not held in Constituency No. 5.

On 23 March 1973, Virahsawmy left the MMM and formed his new party Mouvement Militant Mauricien Socialiste Progressiste (MMMSP), which also became known as MMM sans Paul (MMM without Paul).

With the help of Peter Craig, Alan Ganoo, Alain Laridon and Showkutally Soodhun, Virahsawmy founded the trade union movement called Federation Des Travailleurs Unis (FTU) to assist textile workers to bargain for higher wages and better working conditions.

In 1978 most of the leaders of MMMSP, including Virahsawmy, returned to the MMM but by 1983 they had left the MMM again in order to support the coalition of MSM-Labour-PMSD led by Anerood Jugnauth and Gaetan Duval, especially during the 1983 elections. Virahsawmy designed the official symbol for the newly-formed party MSM in the form of a golden sun on a white background. He became Cultural Advisor in the new MSM-PTr government, but as his passion to promote Kreol as a national language was not supported by the government, Virahsawmy left whilst Soodhun stayed within the MSM government.

== Activities after leaving politics ==
After leaving politics he concentrated on playwriting. He was associated with the early protest theatre in Mauritius.

Virahsawmy was married to Loga Virahsawmy, a feminist and chairperson of Gender and Media Southern Africa. Virahsawmy died on 7 November 2023, at the age of 81.

== Works ==
Dev Virahsawmy had produced an estimated 4000 literary documents according to his wife Loga Virahsawmy at the time of his funeral. Virahsawmy also bequeathed all copyright to his works to the Catholic Church's Institut Cardinal Jean Margéot (ICJM). About 3000 of the 4000 documents are poems. He wrote original works in Morisyen (Mauritian Creole) and also translated a large number of publications from English and French to Morisyen.

=== Drama ===
  - Li. (préface de Dan Callikan). Rose Hill: MMMSP, 1977; (avec traduction en français de Carpanin Marimoutou, en créole réunionnais de Firmin Lacpatia). Saint-Pierre: les Chemins de la liberté, 1979.
  - Bef dâ disab: pies â de ak. Rose Hill: Edisio MMMSP, 1979.
  - Bef dâ disab. (édition trilingue). Saint-Denis: Mouvement culturel réunionnais, 1980.
  - Linconsing finalay: pies â III ak. Rose Hill: Edisiô Bukié bananié, 1980.
  - Trazedi Sir Kutta-Gram: ên badinaz futâ. Rose Hill: Bukié Banané, 1980.
  - Zeneral Makbef: pies â III ak. (inspiré par Macbeth, de William Shakespeare). Rose Hill: Bukié Banané, 1981.
  - Dropadi: teks pu ên trazi-komedi mizikal bazé lor Mahabharata. Rose Hill: Bukié Banané, 1982.
  - Tâtin Madok: pies â ên ak. Maurice: [s.n.], 1983.
  - Krishna. (Pièce télévisuelle, montée par la MBC, station nationale). Rose Hill, 1983.
  - Zistwar Bisma: Komedi mizikal pu zâfâ. Rose Hill: 1984.
  - Dokter Nipat: pies â III ak. (préface en français par Daniel Baggioni). Port-Louis: Bukié Banané, 1983.
  - Profeser Madli: pies â III ak. Rose Hill: [D. Virahsawmy], 1984.
  - Sir Toby.Port Louis: LPT, 1998.
  - Abs Lemanifik: ên fâtezi â III ak. (préface en français de Daniel Baggioni). Rose Hill: Bukié Banané, 1985.
  - Toufann: enn fantezi entrwa ak. Rose Hill: Boukié Banané, 1991.
  - Galileo Gonaz: piess an trwa ak. Port-Louis: Ledikasyon pu Travayer, 1996.
  - Dokter Hamlet. Rose Hill: Boukié Banané (site web), 1996.
  - Hamlet II. Rose Hill: Boukié Banané (site web), 1996.
  - Mamzel Zann. Rose Hill: Boukié Banané (site web), 1997.
  - Ziliet ek so Romeo. Rose Hill: Boukié Banané (site web), 1998.
  - Ti-Marie. Rose Hill: Boukié Banané (site web), 1998.
  - Dernie vol. Rose Hill: Boukié Banané (site web), 2003.
  - Tabisman Lir. Rose Hill: Boukié Banané (site web), 2003.
  - Bistop. Rose Hill: Boukié Banané (site web), 2003.

=== Poetry ===
  - Disik salé. (préface de D. Callikan). Rose Hill: MMMSP, 1977.
  - Lafime dâ lizie. Rose Hill: MMMSP, 1977; Lafime dâ lizie / Fimé dann zié / Fumées dans les yeux. (édition trilingue: créole mauricien, français, créole réunionnais). La Réunion: les Chemins de la liberté, 1979.
  - Lès lapo kabri gazuyé. (texte en Bhojpuri, version française de Carpanin Marimoutou, version créole réunionnaise de Firmin Lacpatia). Saint-Pierre: Mouvement culturel réunionnais, 1980.
  - Trip séré lagorz amaré. (édition trilingue). Saint-Denis: Mouvement culturel réunionnais, 1980.
  - Mo Rapel. Rose Hill: Bukié Banané, 1980.
  - Lôbraz lavi: solely feneâ. (préface de Jaynarain Meetoo). Rose Hill: Bukié Banané, 1981.
  - Twa ek mwa. Rose Hill: 1983–1984.
  - Poem pu zâfâ. Rose Hill: 1983–1984.
  - Abs lemanifik: ên fâtezi â III ak. (préface en français de Daniel Baggioni). Rose Hill: Bukié Banané, 1985.
  - The Walls. (trilingue). Rose Hill: D. Virahsawmy, 1985;The Walls: an operatic poem. (version en anglais) Rose Hill: Bukié Banané, 1985.
  - Nwar, Nwar, Nwar, do Mama. Rose Hill: Bukié Banané, 1986.
  - Lalang peyna lezo. Rose Hill: [D. Virahsawmy], 1991.
  - Petal ek pikan parsi-parla. Port-Louis: Ledikasyon pu Travayer, 1996.
  - Latchizann pou letan lapli. Port-Louis: Ledikasyon pu Travayer, 1997.
  - Testaman enn metschiss. Port-Louis: Boukié Banané, 1999.
  - Labouzi dan labriz. (In kaye literer). Port-Louis: Boukié Banané, 2002.

=== Prose ===
==== Novels ====
- Souiv Larout Ziska… Rose Hill: Boukié Banané (site web), 2002.

=== Essays ===
- Towards a re-evaluation of Mauritian Creole. Post-Graduate Diploma Dissertation (Applied Linguistics). Edinburgh University, 1967.

==== Articles ====
- Literesi an Morisien. Boukié Banané, 2001.
- Aprann Lir ek Ekrir Morisien. Livre electronique. Librairie Le Cygne, 2004.

=== Translations and adaptations by Dev Virahsawmy ===
==== in Morisien ====
- Enn ta senn dan vid (Much Ado About Nothing), of William Shakespeare. Port-Louis: Ledikasyon pu Travayer, 1995.
- Zil Sezar (Julius Caesar), of William Shakespeare.
- Trazedi Makbes (Macbeth), of William Shakespeare.
- Tartif Froder, of Molière. Port Louis: Boukié Banané, 1999.
- Zistoir Ti-Prens (Petit Prince), of Antoine de Saint-Exupéry, Tintenfab (Germany), 2006
- Ti-Pier Dezorder (Der Struwwelpeter), de Heinrich Hoffman.
- Baz zanimo (Animal Farm), of George Orwell.
- Bhagavad-Gita an Morisien (Bhagavad Gita)
- Oupanishad(Upanishads)
- Rigveda (Rigveda)
- Labib, Lexod et Zenez (Bible)
- Ansien Testaman, 2 liv poetik : Job ek Sante Salomon (Old Testament)
- Koran volim 1,2,3 (Quran)
- Ki été Shinnyo-En ? Boudism pou nou lepok (Shinnyo-en)

=== Translations ===
==== In English ====
- The Prisoner of Conscience (Li). Trad. Ramesh Ramdoyal. Moka, Mauritius: Éditions de l’Océan indien, 1982.
- Toufann: A Mauritian Fantasy. Trans. Nisha and Michael Walling. African Theatre: Playwrights and Politics. Eds. Martin Banham, James Gibbs, & Femi Osofisan. Oxford: James Currey and Indianapolis: Indiana University Press. 1999: 217–54.
- Dernie Vol / The Last Flight. Trad. Joyce Fortuné-Pope. International Journal of Francophone Studies 13.3-4 (2010): 595–612.

==== in French ====
- Toufann; une fantaisie en trois actes. Trad. Dominique Tranquille. (postface de Françoise Lionnet) Port Louis: Educational Production Ltd., 2004.

== Influence ==
Some of the lyrics of Ziskakan are from early poems by Virahsawmy.
