= Khal Torabully =

Mauritian and French poet (born 1956)

Khal Torabully is a Mauritian poet. He is a poet, essayist, film director and semiologist. He has won several literary awards, including Lettres-Frontière, Switzerland, Prix du Salon du Livre Insulaire, France and Prix Missives, France. He coined the word 'coolitude'. Later, he was known as the 'Father of Coolitude'.

== Background ==
Torabully was born in the capital city Port Louis, Mauritius in 1956. His father was a Trinidadian sailor and his mother was a descendant of migrants from India and Malaya. He studied comparative literature at the University of Lyon II from 1976. Later, he did his PhD thesis in semiology of poetics with Michel Cusin.

He has authored over 25 books. He indulged in linguistic acrobatics, like wordplay and neologisms, to heighten the seriousness of his themes.

== Films ==
- Pic Pic, Nomade d’une île, 1996.
- La traboule des vagues, multi broadcast Tele Lyon Metropole.
- Malcolm de Chazal, (52'), portrait of an artist, with France Telecom.
- Portraits de Mémoire en Gironde, France, 2010.
- The Maritime Memory of the Arabs, Oman TV, Chamarel Films, France 2001.
