= Édouard Maunick =

Mauritian writer (1931–2021)

- Born: Édouard Joseph Marc Maunick; 23 September 1931
- Died: 10 April 2021 (aged 89)
- Occupations: Poet and editor
- Awards: Grand prix de la francophonie (2003); Prix Guillaume Apollinaire (1977)

Édouard Joseph Marc Maunick (23 September 1931 – 10 April 2021) was a Mauritian poet, critic, and translator.

== Biography ==
Maunick was a métis or mulatto, and as such was the subject of discrimination from both blacks and whites. He worked briefly as a librarian in Port-Louis before going in 1960 to Paris, where he wrote, lectured, and directed for Coopération Radiophonique. He was also a frequent contributor to Présence Africaine and other journals.

Maunick's work was based not in the more traditional search for roots to establish an individual identity. Instead, he lamented his own isolation and the persecution of his people in poetry collections such as C.

On 16 October 2003, Edouard Maunick received the Grand prix de la francophonie, awarded by the Académie française. He won the 1977 Prix Guillaume Apollinaire for Ensoleillé vif.

== Family ==
Édouard Maunick grew up with his siblings Ursule, Jacques, Antoine (Tony RIP), Jean, Marie and Gérard in British Mauritius. Édouard Maunick's elder sister Lady Ursule Ramdanee is Kobita Jugnauth's mother. Jacques Maunick is a journalist, radio presenter and a former director of MBC Radio. Youngest sibling Gérard Maunick is an established award winning songwriter, recording artist and Musician now based in Australia.

Édouard’s sons, Jean-Paul and Olivier are also musicians and songwriters.

Jean-Paul (Bluey) is a world wide record producer and the founder of the UK band Incognito. Bluey is based in the UK while his younger brother Olivier has established himself in Paris (France).

Édouard’s Daughter also lives in the UK (minutes away from her mother and brother, Jean-Paul)

== Sources ==
- Édouard J. Maunick, biography, bibliography, links and recordings of the poet reading his work (in French; Île en île).
- Label France: One hundred creative artists who have chosen France - Edouard Maunick, the marriage of French and Creole.
- Review of Elle & île - Poèmes d'une même passion
