= Shenaz Patel =

Mauritian writer (born 1966)

Shenaz Patel (Gujarati: શેનાઝ પટેલ; born July 29, 1966) is a Mauritian writer and politician.

== Early life and education ==
She was born in the town of Rose Hill, Mauritius and writes in both French and Mauritian Creole. She did her secondary studies at Lycée La Bourdonnais. Subsequently, she obtained her degree in Modern Literature from the Université de la Réunion in 1986.

== Career ==
Patel was one of a group of Mauritian writers who founded the literary journal Tracés. She has translated two Tintin stories into Creole: Le Secret de la Licorne and Trésor de Rackham le Rouge.

Her first play La phobie du caméléon was awarded the Prix Beaumarchais.

In 2014, Vents d'ailleurs published her novella Paradis Blues, which is written in French with Creole interspersed through the narration.

In 2016, she was a participant in the International Writing Program's Fall Residency at the University of Iowa, in Iowa City, IA.

== Selected works ==
=== Novels ===
- Le Portrait Chamarel (2002), received the Prix Radio-France du livre de l'Océan Indien
- Sensitive (2003), received the Prix du Roman francophone
- Le Silence des Chagos (2005), received the Prix Soroptimist de la Romancière francophone
- Paradis Blues (2014)

=== Stories ===
- "À l'encre d'un nom" in Au tour des Femmes (1995)
- "Ille était une fois" in Maurice, demain et après (1996)
- "Do-do, l'enfant" in Histoires d'enfants (1999)
- "Marée noire" in Nocturnes (2000)
- "Zistwar mistran" in Nouvelles de l'étrange (2001), Creole
- "Nous avons pris des bateaux" and "Anvolé" (Creole) in Voyages (2002)
- "Désir de mer" and "Lamer inn fermé" (Creole) in En mer (2004)
- "Incroyable, dites-vous" and "Si ziraf pa kapav anvalé" (Creole) in Histoires incroyables (2007)
- "Zistwar sosouri" in Zistwar zanimo (2010), Creole
- "L'envers du ciel" in De l'autre côté du ciel (2011)

=== Play ===
- La Phobie du Caméléon, 2005

=== Translations ===
- Rakam Ti-Rouz, translation in Mauritian Creole of the Tintin album Red Rackham's Treasure
- Esper Godo, a translation into Mauritian Creole of Samuel Beckett's Waiting for Godot

== Literary Awards and distinctions ==
Patel has been awarded the following honours:

Year	Award / Distinction
2002	Prix Radio-France du livre de l’Océan Indien, for Le Portrait Chamarel.
2004	Prix du Roman francophone, for Sensitive.
2005	Prix Beaumarchais des écritures dramatiques de l’Océan Indien, for La phobie du caméléon.
2006	Prix Soroptimist de la Romancière francophone, for Le Silence des Chagos.
2016	International Writing Program Resident, University of Iowa
2018	Sheila Biddle Ford Foundation Fellow, Hutchins Center for African & African American Research, Harvard University.
