= Eugénie Poujade =

Mauritian poet and writer (1814–1881)

- Born: 1814; Port Louis, Mauritius
- Died: 1881 (aged 66–67)
- Occupations: Poet, writer
- Writing career
- Language: French
- Years active: 1860s
- Notable work: Maurice et France

Jeanne Eugénie Poujade (1814 – 1881) also Madame Delafond, also Madame la Comtesse E. de Sornay was a Mauritian poet and writer, who founded the Société du Lierre and its periodical La Parisienne.

== Biography ==
Sous les tropiques by APL Folly and Madame la Comtesse E. de Sornay (Eugénie Poujade)

Poujade was born in 1814 in Port Louis, Mauritius. In 1834, she married Count Charles Antoine Pierre Octave Sornay. After his death, she remarried in 1858 to Pierre Antoine Delafond. She became known in 1862 with a volume of poetry, Maurice et France, then published two years later Contes de ma tante Joséphine. In 1865, the first issue of the newspaper La Parisienne was published, of which she was the director. In the periodical Le Monde illustré, La Parisienne is presented as a publication of the Société du Lierre, which Poujade had founded. This literary circle, "provisionally [composed] of twenty members, meeting once a week" was open to women. She also wrote librettos, for example for Sous les tropiques by A P L Folly. By 1869, she was involved with the Société Protectrice de l'Enfance. She died in 1881.

== Selected works ==
- Maurice et France (1862)
- Essai sur les moeurs et le progrès au XIXe siècle (1864)
- Contes de ma tante Joséphine (1865)
- Les Parfums de la vie, la poésie... (Paris: impr. de AlcanLévy, 1868)
