= Marie-Thérèse Humbert =

Mauritian writer

Marie-Thérèse Humbert (born July 17, 1940) is a Mauritian writer. She is a recipient of the Grand prix des lectrices de Elle.

== Biography ==
She was born in Quatre Bornes and was educated at Cambridge University and the Sorbonne. She moved to France in 1968. She ran as a socialist candidate in the Indre department of France and also ran as a candidate for municipal government in Saint-Julien-de-Vouvantes.

== Selected works ==
=== Novels ===
- À l'autre bout de moi (1979), received the Grand prix des lectrices de Elle.
- Le Volkameria (1984)
- Une robe d'écume et de vent (1989)
- Un fils d'orage (1992), received the Prix Terre de France
- La montagne des signaux (1994)
- Le chant du seringat la nuit (1997)
- Amy (1998)
- Comme un voile d'ombres (2000)

=== Short stories ===
- "En guise de préface" in Maurice, le tour de l'île en quatre-vingts lieux (1994)
- "Parole de femme" in Au tour des femmes (1995)
- "De la lumière, de l'amour et du silence", "Le tout ainsi, en vrac" and "Clopin-clopant" in Raymonde Vincent, 1908-1985, hommages (1995)
- "Adeline" in Tombeau du cœur de François II (1997)
- "La véritable histoire de notre mère Eve au Jardin d'Eden" in Elles, Histoires de femmes (1999)
- "Les galants de Lydie" in Une enfance outremer (2001)
- "Fraternité; hommage au poète Édouard Maunick" in Riveneuve Continents, Winter 2009-2010
